= George S. Patton =

United States Army general (1885–1945)

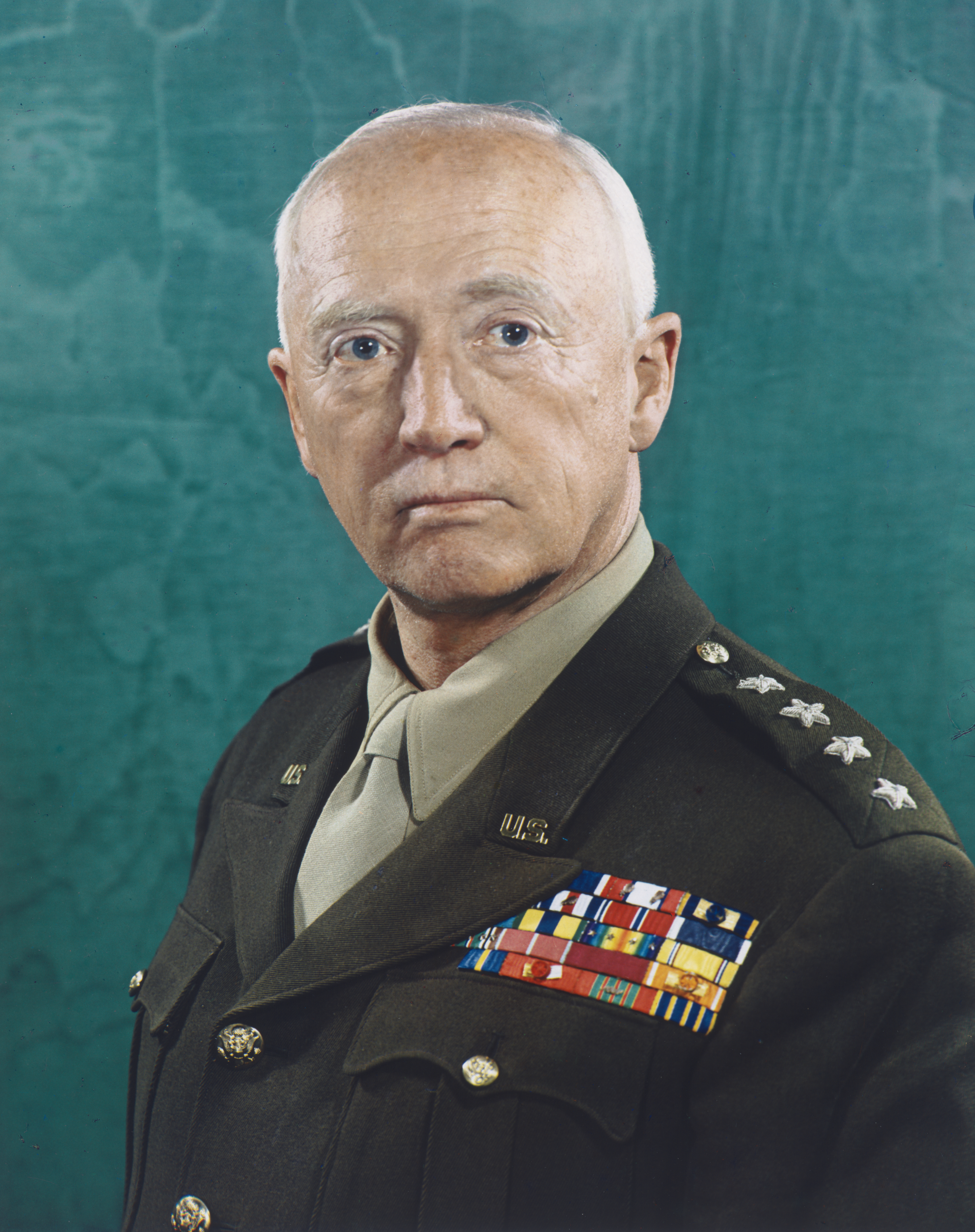
- Official portrait, 1945
- Born: 11 November 1885; San Gabriel, California, U.S.
- Died: 21 December 1945 (aged 60); Heidelberg, Germany
- Burial place: Luxembourg American Cemetery and Memorial
- Education: United States Military Academy (class of 1909); Virginia Military Institute (did not graduate)
- Spouse: Beatrice Banning Ayer (m. 1910)
- Children: 3, including George Patton IV
- Relatives: George Smith Patton II (father); George Smith Patton I (paternal grandfather); Susan Thornton Glassell (paternal grandmother); Benjamin Davis Wilson (maternal grandfather); Frederick Ayer (father-in-law); John K. Waters (son-in-law)
- Military career
- Allegiance: United States of America
- Branch: United States Army
- Service years: 1903–1945
- Rank: General
- Nicknames: "Bandito" "Old Blood and Guts"
- Service number: 0-2605
- Unit: Cavalry Branch
- Commands: Fifteenth United States Army; Third United States Army; Seventh United States Army; II Corps; Desert Training Center; I Armored Corps; 2nd Armored Division; 2nd Brigade, 2nd Armored Division; 3rd Cavalry Regiment; 5th Cavalry Regiment; 3rd Squadron, 3rd Cavalry; 304th Tank Brigade
- Conflicts: See battles: Border War; Pancho Villa Expedition; World War I; Saint Mihiel Campaign; Meuse-Argonne Campaign; World War II; Mediterranean Theater of War; North African campaign; Operation Torch; Operation Brushwood; Battle of Port Lyautey; Tunisian campaign; Battle of El Guettar; European theater; Operation Husky; Battle of Gela; Battle of Troina; Western Front; Allied invasion of France; Operation Overlord; Falaise pocket; Battle of Chambois; Liberation of Paris; Siegfried Line campaign; Lorraine campaign; Battle of Nancy; Battle of Arracourt; Battle of Metz; Battle of Fort Driant; Saar campaign; Battle of the Saar River; Battle of Saarlautern; Battle of the Bulge; Siege of Bastogne; Saar-Palatinate campaign; Eifel campaign; Central Europe Campaign; Task Force Baum; Battle of Aschaffenburg; Danube offensive; Western Bohemia offensive
- Awards: Distinguished Service Cross (2); Army Distinguished Service Medal (3); Silver Star (2); Legion of Merit; Bronze Star Medal; Purple Heart; Complete list of decorations

George Smith Patton Jr. (11 November 1885 – 21 December 1945) was a general in the United States Army who commanded the Seventh Army in the Mediterranean Theater of World War II, then the Third Army in France and Germany after the Allied invasion of Normandy in June 1944.

Born in 1885, Patton attended the Virginia Military Institute and the United States Military Academy at West Point. He studied fencing and designed the M1913 Cavalry Saber, more commonly known as the "Patton Saber." He competed in the modern pentathlon at the 1912 Summer Olympics in Stockholm, Sweden, finishing in fifth place. Patton entered combat during the Pancho Villa Expedition of 1916, the United States' first military action using motor vehicles. He fought in World War I as part of the Tank Corps: he commanded the U.S. tank school in France, then led tanks into combat and was wounded near the end of the war. In the interwar period, Patton became a central figure in the development of the army's armored warfare doctrine, serving in numerous staff positions throughout the country. At the United States' entry into World War II, he commanded the 2nd Armored Division.

Patton led U.S. troops into the Mediterranean theater with an invasion of Casablanca during Operation Torch in 1942, and soon established himself as an effective commander by rapidly rehabilitating the demoralized II Corps. He commanded the U.S. Seventh Army during the Allied invasion of Sicily, where he was the first Allied commander to reach Messina. There he was embroiled in controversy after he slapped two shell-shocked soldiers, and was temporarily removed from battlefield command. He was assigned a key role in Operation Fortitude, the Allies' military deception campaign for Operation Overlord. At the start of the Western Allied invasion of France, Patton was given command of the Third Army, which conducted a highly successful rapid armored drive across France. Under his decisive leadership, the Third Army took the lead in relieving beleaguered American troops at Bastogne during the Battle of the Bulge, after which his forces drove deep into Nazi Germany by the end of the war. During the Allied occupation of Germany, Patton was named military governor of Bavaria, but was relieved for making aggressive statements towards the Soviet Union and questioning denazification. He also held antisemitic views and made derogatory statements about Jewish people. He commanded the United States Fifteenth Army for slightly more than two months. Severely injured in an auto accident, he died in Germany twelve days later, on 21 December 1945.

Patton's colorful image, hard-driving personality, and success as a commander were at times overshadowed by his controversial public statements. His philosophy of leading from the front, and his ability to inspire troops with attention-getting, vulgarity-laden speeches, such as his famous address to the Third Army, were received favorably by his troops, but much less so by a sharply divided Allied high command. His sending the doomed Task Force Baum to liberate his son-in-law, Lieutenant Colonel John K. Waters, from a prisoner-of-war camp further damaged his standing with his superiors. His emphasis on rapid and aggressive offensive action proved effective, and he was regarded highly by his opponents in the German High Command. The 1970 Oscar-winning biographical film Patton helped popularize his image.

== Early life ==
George Smith Patton Jr. was born in the Los Angeles suburb of San Gabriel, California on 11 November 1885, the son of George S. Patton and Ruth (Wilson) Patton. Ruth Wilson was the daughter of Benjamin Davis Wilson, the second mayor of Los Angeles, and Margaret Hereford, a widow from Virginia. The wealthy Patton family resided at Lake Vineyard, built by Benjamin Wilson, on 128 acres (52 ha) in present-day San Marino, California. Patton had a younger sister, Anne, nicknamed "Nita". Nita became engaged to John J. Pershing, Patton's mentor, in 1917, but the engagement ended because of their separation during Pershing's time in France during World War I. Patton's paternal grandfather was Confederate colonel George S. Patton Sr.

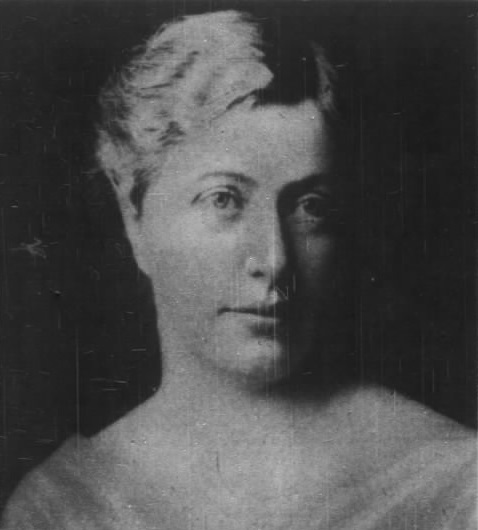
Anne Wilson "Nita" Patton, Patton's sister. She was engaged to John J. Pershing in 1917–1918.

As a child, Patton had difficulty learning to read and write, but eventually overcame this and was known in his adult life to be an avid reader. (Note: Historians Carlo D'Este and Alan Axelrod note in their biographies of Patton that these difficulties were likely the result of undiagnosed dyslexia.) He was tutored from home until the age of eleven, when he was enrolled in Stephen Cutter Clark's Classical School for Boys, a private school in Pasadena, for six years. Patton was described as an intelligent boy and was widely read in classical military history, particularly the exploits of Hannibal, Scipio Africanus, Julius Caesar, Joan of Arc, and Napoleon Bonaparte, as well as those of Confederate cavalry commander John Singleton Mosby, a family friend who frequently stopped by the Patton family home when George was a child. He was also a devoted horseback rider.

Patton never seriously considered a career other than the military. At the age of seventeen he sought an appointment to the United States Military Academy at West Point, New York. He also applied to several universities with military corps of cadet programs, and was accepted to Princeton, but eventually decided on the Virginia Military Institute (VMI), which his father and grandfather had attended. He attended the school from 1903 to 1904, and though he struggled with reading and writing, performed exceptionally in uniform and appearance inspection, as well drill.

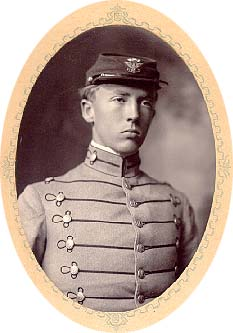
Patton at the Virginia Military Institute.

While he was at VMI, Senator Thomas R. Bard nominated him for West Point. He was an initiate of the Beta Commission of Kappa Alpha Order.

In his plebe (first) year at West Point, Patton adjusted easily to the routine. However, his academic performance was so poor that he was forced to repeat his first year after failing mathematics. He excelled at military drills, though his academic performance remained average. He was cadet sergeant major during his junior year, and the cadet adjutant his senior year. He also joined the football team, but he injured his arm and stopped playing on several occasions. Instead he tried out for the sword team and track and field and specialized in the modern pentathlon. He competed in this sport in the 1912 Summer Olympics in Stockholm, and he finished in fifth place—right behind four Swedes.

Patton graduated number 46 out of 103 cadets at West Point on 11 June 1909, and received a commission as a second lieutenant in the Cavalry branch of the United States Army.

At age 24, Patton married Beatrice Banning Ayer, the daughter of Boston industrialist Frederick Ayer, on 26 May 1910, in Beverly Farms, Massachusetts. They had three children, Beatrice Smith (born March 1911), Ruth Ellen (born February 1915), and George Patton IV (born December 1923). Patton's wife Beatrice died on 30 September 1953, from a ruptured aneurysm after falling while riding her horse in a hunt with her brother and others at the Myopia Hunt Club in South Hamilton, Massachusetts.

Patton was an Episcopalian.

=== Ancestry ===
The Patton family was of Scottish, Irish, Scots-Irish, French, English and Welsh ancestry. His great-grandmother came from an aristocratic Welsh family, descended from many Welsh lords of Glamorgan, which had an extensive military background. Patton believed he had formerly lived as a soldier and took pride in mystical ties with his ancestors. Though not directly descended from George Washington, Patton traced some of his English colonial roots to Lawrence Washington.

He was also descended from England's King Edward I through Edward's son Edmund of Woodstock, 1st Earl of Kent. Family belief held the Pattons were descended from sixteen barons who had signed Magna Carta. Patton believed in reincarnation, stating that he had fought in previous battles and wars before his time, additionally, his ancestry was very important to him, forming a central part of his personal identity. The first Patton in North America was Robert Patton, born in Ayr, Scotland. He emigrated from Glasgow to Culpeper, Virginia, in either 1769 or 1770.

George Patton, Jr.'s paternal grandfather was George Smith Patton, who commanded the 22nd Virginia Infantry under Jubal Early in the Civil War and was killed in the Third Battle of Winchester; his great-uncle Waller T. Patton was killed in Pickett's Charge leading the 7th Virginia Infantry regiment during the Battle of Gettysburg. Patton also descended from Hugh Mercer, a Scottish Brigadier General, who had been killed in the Battle of Princeton during the American Revolutionary War. Patton's father, who graduated from the Virginia Military Institute (VMI), became a lawyer and later the district attorney of Los Angeles County. Patton's maternal grandfather was Benjamin Davis Wilson, a merchant who had been the second Mayor of Los Angeles.

His father was a wealthy rancher and lawyer who owned a one-thousand-acre (400 ha) ranch near Pasadena, California. Wilson had married into one of the original Southern California settler families by marrying Ramona Yorba, who was the daughter of prominent Californio (Spanish and Mexican settlers in California) Bernardo Yorba, after whom the city of Yorba Linda is named. Patton is also a descendant of Louis DuBois, a French Huguenot.

== Early military career ==
Patton's first posting was with the 15th Cavalry at Fort Sheridan, Illinois, where he established himself as a diligent leader who impressed superiors with his dedication. In late 1911, Patton was transferred to Fort Myer, Virginia, where many of the Army's senior leaders were stationed. Befriending Secretary of War Henry L. Stimson, Patton served as his aide at social functions on top of his regular duties as quartermaster for his troop. Patton had a high-pitched voice and worried that this would make it impossible for him to inspire his troops.

=== 1912 Olympics ===
For his skill in running and fencing, Patton was selected as the Army's entry for the first modern pentathlon at the 1912 Summer Olympics in Stockholm, Sweden. Patton was the only American among the 42 pentathletes, who were all officers. Patton placed twenty-first on the pistol range, seventh in swimming, fourth in fencing, sixth in the equestrian competition, and third in the footrace, finishing fifth overall and first among the non-Swedish competitors.

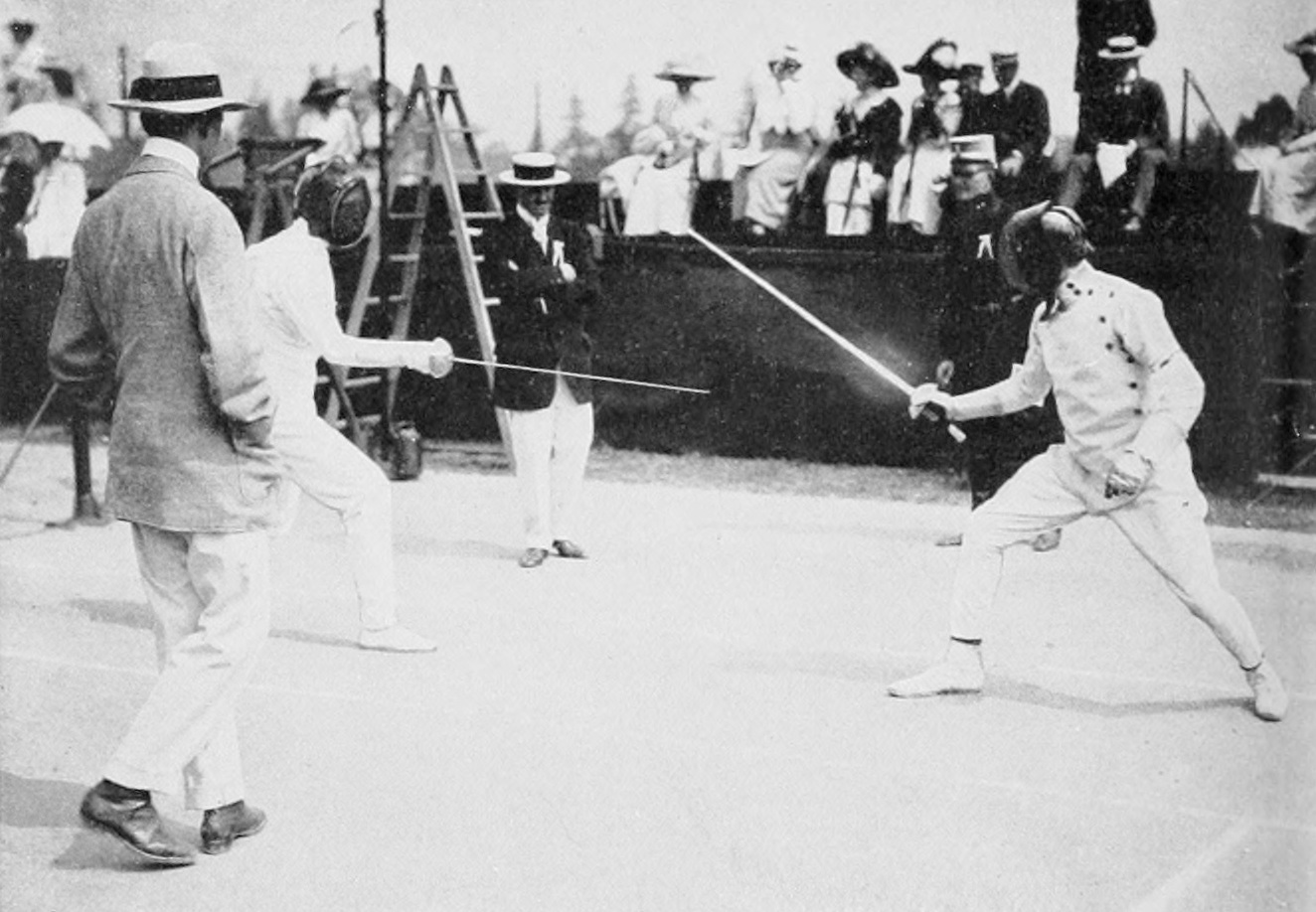
Patton (right) fencing in the modern pentathlon of the 1912 Summer Olympics

There was some controversy concerning his performance in the pistol shooting competition, in which he used a .38 caliber U.S. Army-issue pistol while most of the other competitors chose .22 caliber firearms. He claimed that the holes in the paper from his early shots were so large that a later bullet passed through them, but the judges decided that one of his bullets missed the target completely. Modern competitions at this level frequently now employ a moving backdrop specifically to track multiple shots through the same hole. If his assertion was correct, Patton would likely have won an Olympic medal in the event. The judges' ruling was upheld. Patton's only comment on the matter was:

The high spirit of sportsmanship and generosity manifested throughout speaks volumes for the character of the officers of the present day. There was not a single incident of a protest or any unsportsmanlike quibbling or fighting for points which I may say, marred some of the other civilian competitions at the Olympic Games. Each man did his best and took what fortune sent them like a true soldier, and at the end we all felt more like good friends and comrades than rivals in a severe competition, yet this spirit of friendship in no manner detracted from the zeal with which all strove for success.

=== Sword design ===
US Army "Patton" Swordsman Badge

Following the 1912 Olympics, Patton traveled to Saumur, France, where he learned fencing techniques from Adjutant Charles Cléry, a French "master of arms" and instructor of fencing at the cavalry school there. Bringing these lessons back to Fort Myer, Patton redesigned saber combat doctrine along with a training and certification program for the U.S. cavalry, favoring thrusting attacks over the standard slashing maneuver and designing a new sword for such attacks. He established and designed a new Swordsmanship Badge. To earn the badge, an enlisted trooper had to complete a mounted, timed, and scored course, while engaging ten targets and successfully jumping a five-foot hurdle. Only two men per troop were awarded the badge. He was temporarily assigned to the Office of the Army Chief of Staff, and in 1913, the first 20,000 of the Model 1913 Cavalry Saber—popularly known as the "Patton saber"—were ordered.

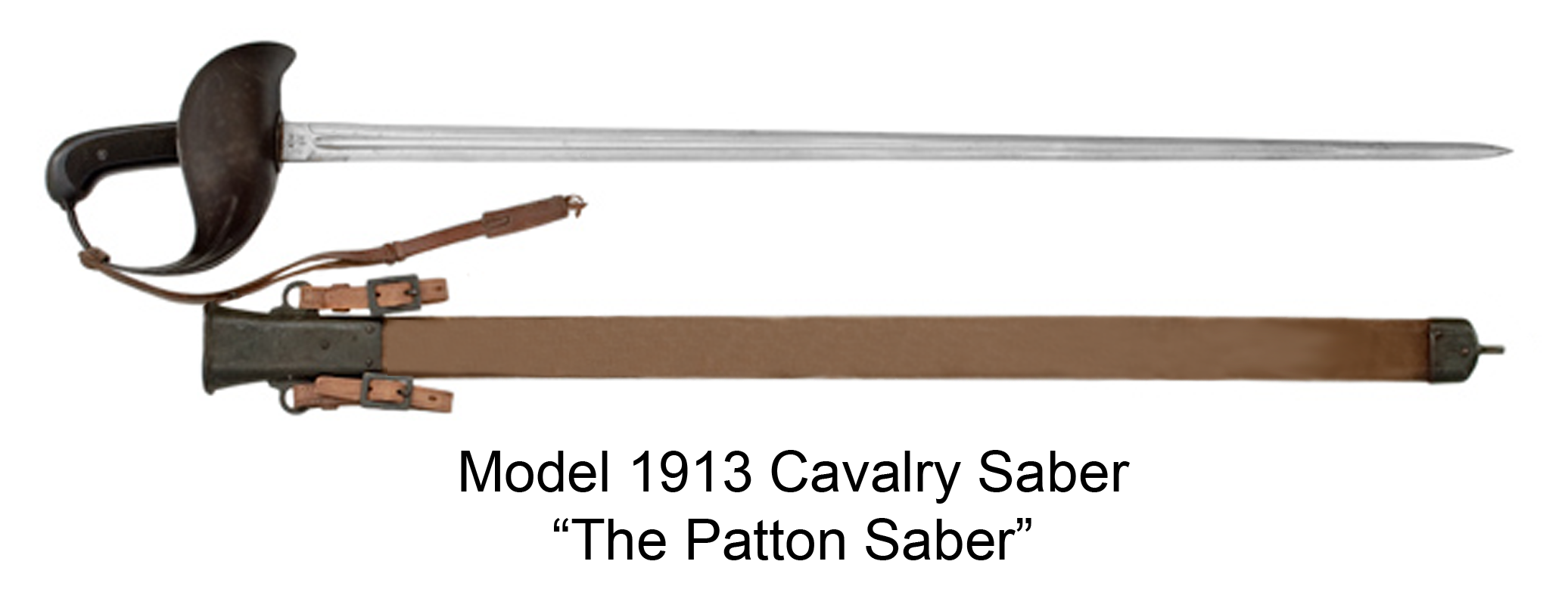

Patton then returned to Saumur to learn advanced techniques before bringing his skills to the Mounted Service School at Fort Riley, Kansas, where he would be both a student and a fencing instructor. He was the first Army officer to be designated "Master of the Sword", a title denoting the school's top instructor in swordsmanship. Arriving in September 1913, he taught fencing to other cavalry officers, many of whom were senior to him in rank.

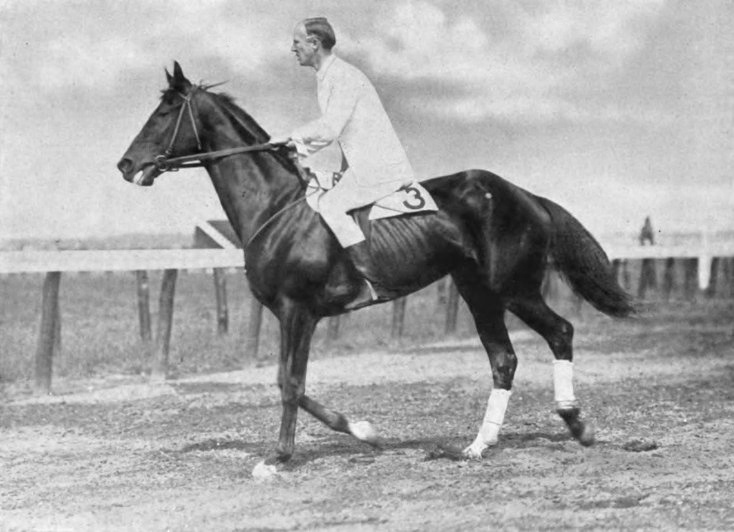
Patton on his steeplechase horse, Wooltex, in 1914

Patton graduated from this school in June 1915. He was originally intended to return to the 15th Cavalry, which was bound for the Philippines. Fearing this assignment would dead-end his career, Patton travelled to Washington, D.C., during 11 days of leave and convinced influential friends to arrange a reassignment for him to the 8th Cavalry at Fort Bliss, Texas, anticipating that instability in Mexico might boil over into a full-scale civil war. In the meantime, Patton was selected to participate in the 1916 Summer Olympics scheduled to be held in Berlin, but that Olympiad was cancelled due to World War I.

== Pancho Villa Expedition ==
In 1915, Lieutenant Patton was assigned to border patrol duty with A Troop of the 8th Cavalry, based in Sierra Blanca. During his time in the town, Patton took to wearing his Colt M1911 in his belt rather than a holster. His firearm discharged accidentally one night in a saloon, so he swapped it for an ivory-handled Colt Single Action Army revolver, a weapon that would later become an icon of Patton's image.

In March 1916, Mexican forces loyal to Pancho Villa crossed into New Mexico and raided the border town of Columbus. The violence in Columbus killed several Americans. In response, the U.S. launched the Pancho Villa Expedition into Mexico. Chagrined to discover that his unit would not participate, Patton appealed to expedition commander John J. Pershing, and was named his personal aide for the expedition. This meant that Patton would have some role in organizing the effort, and his eagerness and dedication to the task impressed Pershing. Patton modeled much of his leadership style after Pershing, who favored strong, decisive actions and commanding from the front. As an aide, Patton oversaw the logistics of Pershing's transportation and acted as his personal courier.

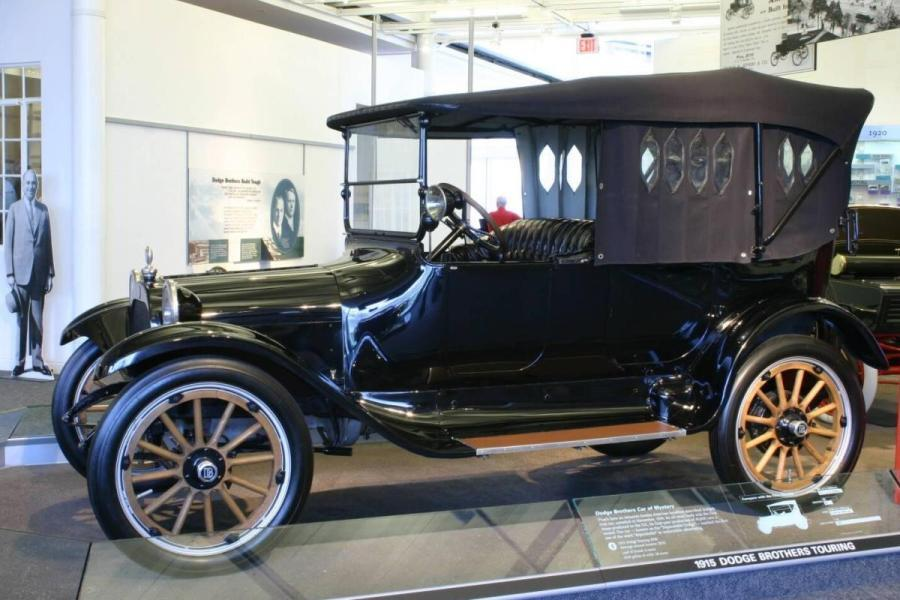
The durability of the 1915 Dodge Brothers Model 30-35 touring car won renown for the new automaker following its use in the 1916 Pancho Villa Expedition.

In mid-April, Patton asked Pershing for the opportunity to command troops, and was assigned to Troop C of the 13th Cavalry to assist in the manhunt for Villa and his subordinates. His initial combat experience came on 14 May 1916, in what would become the first motorized attack in the history of U.S. warfare. A force of ten soldiers and two civilian guides, under Patton's command, with the 6th Infantry in three Dodge touring cars surprised three of Villa's men during a foraging expedition, killing Julio Cárdenas and two of his guards. It was not clear if Patton personally killed any of the men, but he was known to have wounded all three. The incident garnered Patton both Pershing's good favor and widespread media attention as a "bandit killer". Shortly after, he was promoted to first lieutenant while a part of the 10th Cavalry on 23 May 1916. Patton remained in Mexico until the end of the year. President Woodrow Wilson forbade the expedition from conducting aggressive patrols deeper into Mexico, so it remained encamped in the Mexican border states for much of that time. In October Patton briefly retired to California after being burned by an exploding gas lamp. He returned from the expedition permanently in February 1917.

== World War I ==
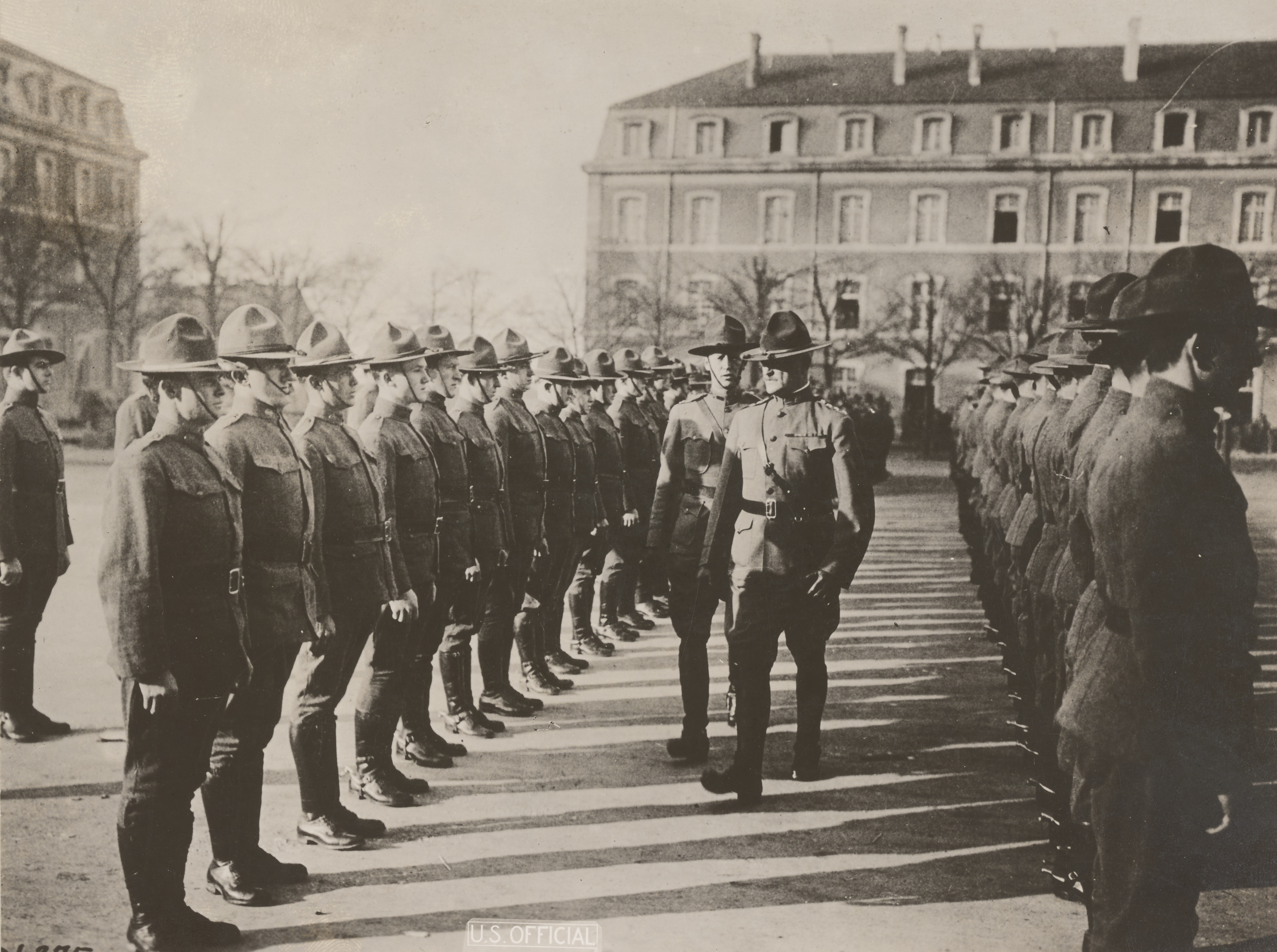
Major General John J. Pershing, accompanied by Captain George S. Patton, inspecting men of Patton's headquarters troop at American Expeditionary Forces (AEF) headquarters, Chaumont, France, 1917

After the Villa Expedition, Patton was detailed to Front Royal, Virginia, to oversee horse procurement for the army, but Pershing intervened on his behalf. After the United States entered World War I, in April 1917, and Pershing was named commander of the American Expeditionary Forces (AEF) on the Western Front, Patton requested to join his staff. Patton was promoted to captain on 15 May 1917, and left for Europe, among the 180 men of Pershing's advance party which departed 28 May and arrived in Liverpool, England, on 8 June. Taken as Pershing's personal aide, Patton oversaw the training of American troops in Paris until September, then moved to Chaumont and was assigned as a post adjutant, commanding the headquarters company overseeing the base. Patton was dissatisfied with the post and began to take an interest in tanks, as Pershing sought to give him command of an infantry battalion. While in a hospital for jaundice, Patton met Colonel Fox Conner, who encouraged him to work with tanks instead of infantry.

On 10 November 1917, Patton was assigned to establish the AEF Light Tank School. He left Paris and reported to the French Army's tank training school at Champlieu near Orrouy, where he drove a Renault FT light tank. On 20 November, the British launched an offensive towards the important rail center of Cambrai, using an unprecedented number of tanks. At the conclusion of his tour on 1 December, Patton went to Albert, 30 miles (48 km) from Cambrai, to be briefed on the results of this attack by the chief of staff of the British Tank Corps, Colonel J. F. C. Fuller. On the way back to Paris, he visited the Renault factory to observe French tanks being manufactured. Patton was promoted to major on 26 January 1918. He received the first ten tanks on 23 March 1918, at the tank school at Bourg, a small village close to Langres, Haute-Marne département. The only US soldier with tank-driving experience, Patton personally backed seven of the tanks off the train. In the post, Patton trained tank crews to operate in support of infantry, and promoted its acceptance among reluctant infantry officers. He was promoted to lieutenant colonel on 3 April 1918, and attended the Command and General Staff College in Langres.

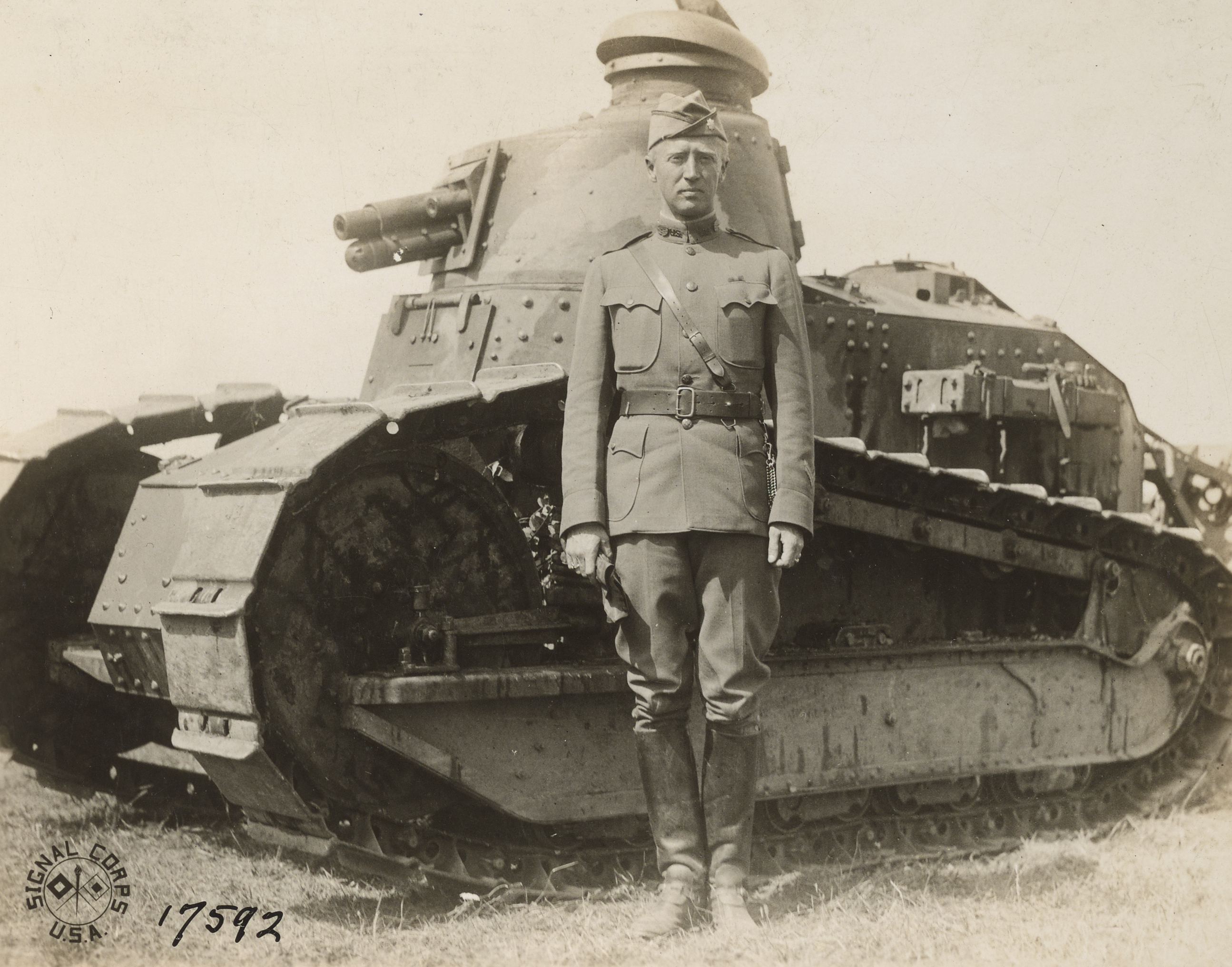
Patton at Bourg in France in 1918 with a Renault FT light tank

In August 1918, he was placed in charge of the U.S. 1st Provisional Tank Brigade (redesignated the 304th Tank Brigade on 6 November 1918). Patton's Light Tank Brigade was part of Colonel Samuel D. Rockenbach's Tank Corps, part of the American First Army. Personally overseeing the logistics of the tanks in their first combat use by U.S. forces, and reconnoitering the target area for their first attack himself, Patton ordered that no U.S. tank be surrendered. Patton commanded American-crewed Renault FT tanks at the Battle of Saint-Mihiel, leading the tanks from the front for much of their attack, which began on 12 September. He walked in front of the tanks into the German-held village of Essey, and rode on top of a tank during the attack into Pannes, seeking to inspire his men.

While outside the village of Essey he had his first chance meeting with Brigadier General Douglas MacArthur, then commanding a brigade of the 42nd "Rainbow" Division, who, at just thirty-eight, was already one of the most highly decorated officers in the AEF, and with whom Patton would serve later in his career.

Patton's brigade was then moved to support I Corps for the upcoming Meuse–Argonne offensive, which began on 26 September. He personally led a troop of tanks through thick fog as they advanced 5 miles (8 km) into German lines. Around 09:00, Patton was wounded while leading six men and a tank in an attack on German machine guns near the town of Cheppy. His orderly, Private First Class Joe Angelo, saved Patton, for which he was later awarded the Distinguished Service Cross (DSC). Patton commanded the battle from a shell hole for another hour before being evacuated. Although the 35th Division (of which Patton's tank troop was a component) eventually captured Varennes, it did so with heavy losses. Trying to move his reserve tanks forward, Patton relates that he might have killed one of his own men, stating: "Some of my reserve tanks were stuck by some trenches. So I went back and made some Americans hiding in the trenches dig a passage. I think I killed one man here. He would not work so I hit him over the head with a shovel."

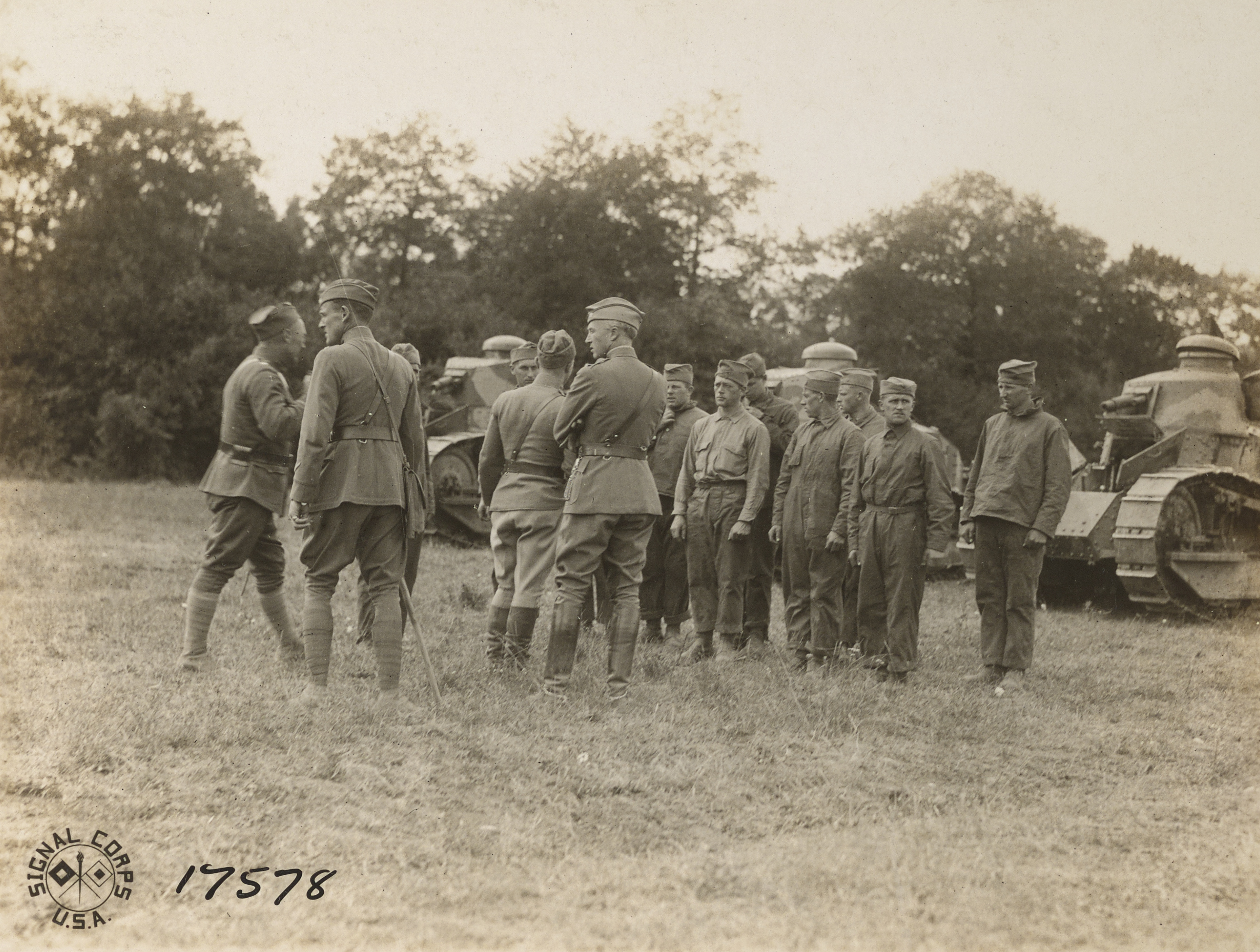
Tank Corps School near Langres, France, 15 July 1918. Tank crew receiving instruction from officers, from left to right: Captain Ranulf Compton, Chief Instructor, and Lieutenant Colonel George S. Patton (center, with back towards the camera), the Commanding Officer

Patton stopped at a rear command post to submit his report before heading to a hospital. Sereno E. Brett, commander of the U.S. 326th Tank Battalion, took command of the brigade in Patton's absence. Patton wrote in a letter to his wife: "The bullet went into the front of my left leg and came out just at the crack of my bottom about two inches to the left of my rectum. It was fired at about 50 m [160 ft] so made a hole about the size of a [silver] dollar where it came out."

While recuperating from his wound, Patton was promoted to temporary colonel in the Tank Corps of the U.S. National Army on 17 October. He returned to duty on 28 October but saw no further action before hostilities ended on his 33rd birthday with the armistice of 11 November 1918. For his actions in Cheppy, Patton received the Silver Star, later upgraded to the DSC. The citation for the medal read:

The President of the United States of America, authorized by Act of Congress, 9 July 1918, takes pleasure in presenting the Distinguished Service Cross to Colonel (Armor) George Smith Patton, Jr. (ASN: 0-2605), United States Army, for extraordinary heroism in action while serving with Tank Corps, A.E.F., near Cheppy, France, 26 September 1918. Colonel Patton displayed conspicuous courage, coolness, energy, and intelligence in directing the advance of his brigade down the valley of the Aire. Later he rallied a force of disorganized infantry and led it forward, behind the tanks, under heavy machine-gun and artillery fire until he was wounded. Unable to advance further, Colonel Patton continued to direct the operations of his unit until all arrangements for turning over the command were completed.

For his leadership of the tank brigade and tank school, he was awarded the Army Distinguished Service Medal, the citation for which reads:

The President of the United States of America, authorized by Act of Congress, 9 July 1918, takes pleasure in presenting the Army Distinguished Service Medal to Colonel (Tank Corps) George Smith Patton, Jr. (ASN: 0-2605), United States Army, for exceptionally meritorious and distinguished services to the Government of the United States, in a duty of great responsibility during World War I. By his energy and sound judgment, Colonel Patton rendered very valuable services in his organization and direction of the Tank Center at the Army schools at Langres, France. In the employment of Tank Corps troops in combat he displayed high military attainments, zeal, and marked adaptability in a form of warfare comparatively new to the American Army.

He was awarded the Purple Heart for his combat wounds after the decoration was created in 1932.

On 11 November 1918, World War I ended. In the months and years that followed Patton was haunted by his experience in the Meuse–Argonne. Although he emerged from the war with honours and acclaim, the year 1918 took its toll and the price was indeed high. Contrary to his image as a tough guy, Patton was deeply affected by the horror of war and suffered from post-traumatic stress. What had been a high on the battlefield turned into the giant letdown that is so common to soldiers who have been in combat.

== Inter-war years ==
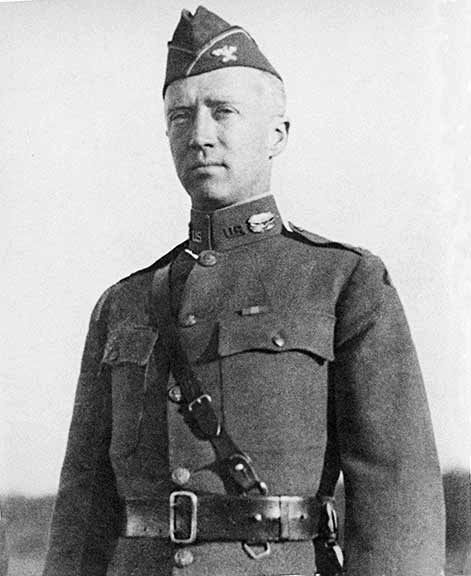
Patton as a temporary colonel at Camp Meade, Maryland, 1919

Patton left France for New York City on 2 March 1919. After the war, he was assigned to Camp Meade, Maryland, and reverted to his permanent rank of captain on 30 June 1920, though he was promoted to major again the next day. Patton was given temporary duty in Washington D.C. that year to serve on a committee writing a manual on tank operations. During this time he developed a belief that tanks should be used not as infantry support, but rather as an independent fighting force. Patton supported the M1919 design created by J. Walter Christie, a project which was shelved due to financial considerations. While on duty in Washington, D.C., in 1919, Patton met Dwight D. Eisenhower, who would play an enormous role in Patton's future career. During and following Patton's assignment in Hawaii, he and Eisenhower corresponded frequently. Patton sent notes and assistance to help Eisenhower graduate from the General Staff College. With Christie, Eisenhower, and a handful of other officers, Patton pushed for more development of armored warfare in the interwar era. These thoughts resonated with Secretary of War Dwight Davis, but the limited military budget and prevalence of already-established Infantry and Cavalry branches meant the U.S. would not develop its armored corps much until 1940.

On 30 September 1920, then-Major Patton relinquished command of the 304th Tank Brigade and was reassigned to Fort Myer as commander of 3rd Squadron, 3rd Cavalry. Loathing duty as a peacetime staff officer, he spent much time writing technical papers and giving speeches on his combat experiences at the General Staff College.

In July 1921 Patton became a member of the American Legion Tank Corps Post No. 19. Maj. Patton led the rescue effort after the January 1922 blizzard destroyed the Knickerbocker Theatre in D.C. From 1922 to mid-1923 he attended the Field Officer's Course at the Cavalry School at Fort Riley, then he attended the Command and General Staff College from mid-1923 to mid-1924, graduating 25th out of 248. In August 1923, Patton saved several children from drowning when they fell off a yacht during a boating trip off Salem, Massachusetts. He was awarded the Silver Lifesaving Medal for this action. He was temporarily appointed to the General Staff Corps in Boston, Massachusetts, before being reassigned as G-1 and G-2 of the Hawaiian Division at Schofield Barracks in Honolulu in March 1925.

Patton was made G-3 of the Hawaiian Division for several months, before being transferred in May 1927 to the Office of the Chief of Cavalry in Washington, D.C., where he began to develop the concepts of mechanized warfare. A short-lived experiment to merge infantry, cavalry and artillery into a combined arms force was cancelled after U.S. Congress removed funding. Patton left this office in 1931, returned to Massachusetts and attended the Army War College, becoming a "Distinguished Graduate" in June 1932.

In July 1932, Patton (still a Major) was executive officer of the 3rd Cavalry, which was ordered to Washington by Army Chief of Staff General Douglas MacArthur. Patton took command of the 600 troops of the 3rd Cavalry, and on 28 July, MacArthur ordered Patton's troops to advance on protesting veterans known as the "Bonus Army" with tear gas and bayonets. Patton was dissatisfied with MacArthur's conduct, as he recognized the legitimacy of the veterans' complaints and had himself earlier refused to issue the order to employ armed force to disperse the veterans. Patton later stated that, though he found the duty "most distasteful", he also felt that putting the marchers down prevented an insurrection and saved lives and property. He personally led the 3rd Cavalry down Pennsylvania Avenue, dispersing the protesters. Patton also encountered his former orderly, Joe Angelo, as one of the marchers and forcibly ordered him away, fearing such a meeting might make the headlines.

Patton was promoted to lieutenant colonel in the regular Army on 1 March 1934, and was transferred to the Hawaiian Division in early 1935 to serve as G-2. During this posting, Patton feuded with his commander, Hugh Aloysius Drum, another Pershing protégé. At a polo match in which Patton was playing, Drum was among the spectators and rebuked Patton for his use of angry profanity during the game. The civilian players, who were members of Hawaii's wealthy elite on friendly terms with the equally wealthy and elite Patton, humiliated Drum by standing up for Patton.

Patton followed the growing hostility and conquest aspirations of the militant Japanese leadership. He wrote a plan to intern the Japanese living in the islands in the event of an attack as a result of the atrocities carried out by Japanese soldiers on the Chinese in the Sino-Japanese war. In 1937 he wrote a paper with the title "Surprise" which predicted, with what D'Este termed "chilling accuracy", a surprise attack by the Japanese on Hawaii. Depressed at the lack of prospects for new conflict, Patton took to drinking heavily and allegedly began a brief affair with his 21-year-old niece by marriage, Jean Gordon. This supposed affair distressed his wife and nearly resulted in their separation. Patton's attempts to win her back were said to be among the few instances in which he willingly showed remorse or submission.

Patton continued playing polo and sailing in this time. After sailing back to Los Angeles for extended leave in 1937, he was kicked by a horse and fractured his leg. Patton developed phlebitis from the injury, which nearly killed him. The incident almost forced Patton out of active service, but a six-month administrative assignment in the Academic Department at the Cavalry School at Fort Riley helped him to recover. Patton was promoted to colonel on 24 July 1938, and given command of the 5th Cavalry at Fort Clark, Texas, for six months, a post he relished, but he was reassigned to Fort Myer again in December as commander of the 3rd Cavalry. There, he met the Army's Deputy Chief of Staff, George C. Marshall, who was so impressed with him that Marshall considered Patton a prime candidate for promotion to general. In peacetime, though, he would remain a colonel to remain eligible to command a regiment. When Malin Craig retired as Chief of Staff of the United States Army in 1939, Drum was a candidate to succeed him. Drum wanted the position badly enough to set aside his feud with Patton and ask Patton to intercede with the retired but still influential Pershing. Despite these efforts, Drum was passed over in favor of Marshall.

Patton had a personal schooner named When and If. The schooner was designed by famous naval architect John G. Alden and built in 1939. The schooner's name comes from Patton saying he would sail it "when and if" he returned from war.

== World War II ==
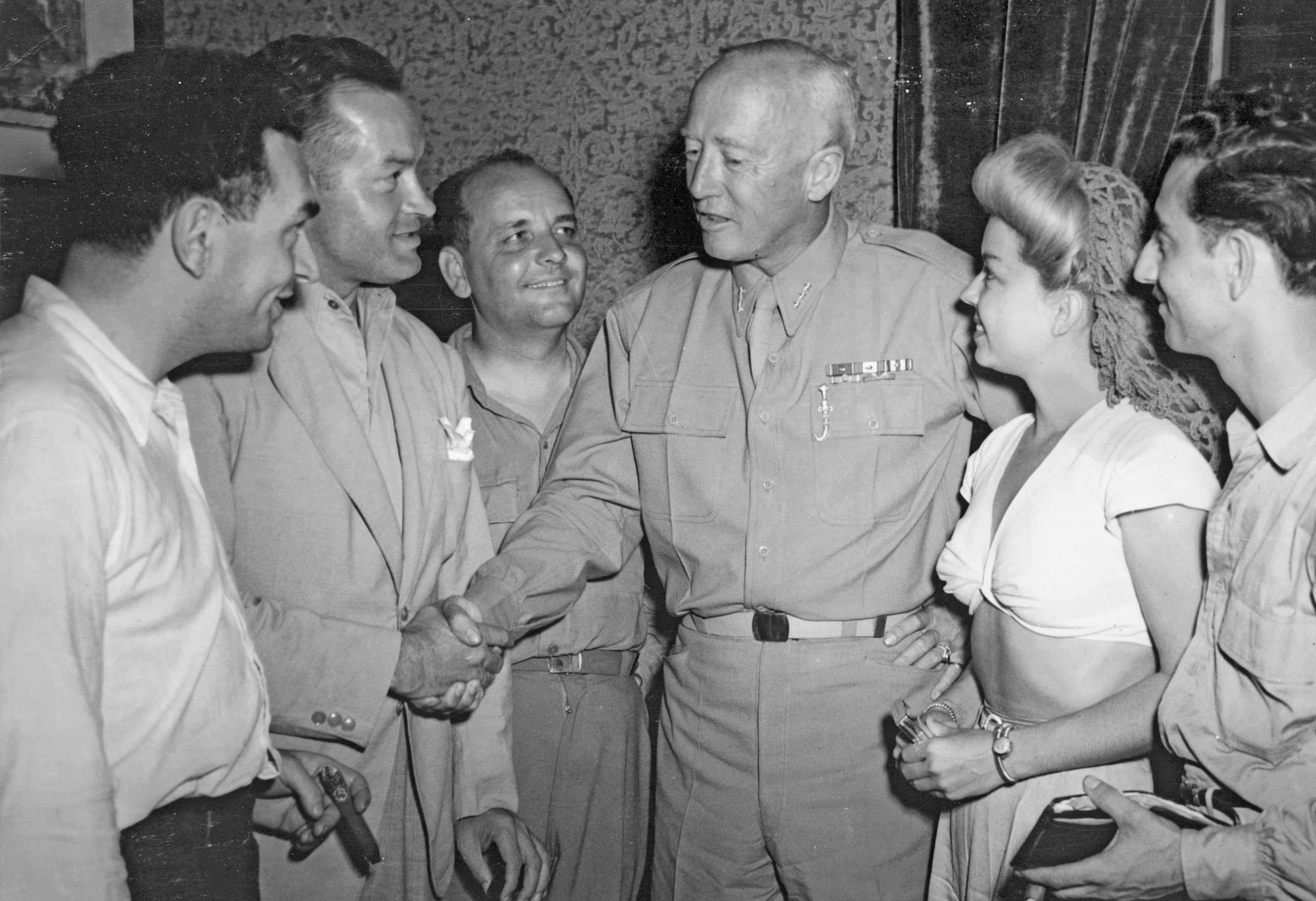
Writer Hal Block (far left), comedian Bob Hope (second from left), writer/actor Barney Dean, singer Frances Langford and musician Tony Romano meet George Patton in Sicily during World War II.

Following the German Army's invasion of Poland and the outbreak of World War II in Europe in September 1939, the U.S. military entered a period of mobilization, and Colonel Patton sought to build up the power of U.S. armored forces. During maneuvers the Third Army conducted in 1940, Patton served as an umpire, where he met Adna R. Chaffee Jr. and the two formulated recommendations to develop an armored force. Chaffee was named commander of this force, and created the 1st and 2nd Armored Divisions as well as the first combined arms doctrine. He named Patton commander of the 2nd Armored Brigade, part of the 2nd Armored Division. The division was one of few organized as a heavy formation with many tanks, and Patton was in charge of its training.

Patton was promoted to brigadier general on 2 October, made acting division commander in November when Charles L. Scott assumed command of I Armored Corps, and on 4 April 1941, was promoted again to major general as Commanding General (CG) of the 2nd Armored Division. As Chaffee stepped down from command of the I Armored Corps, Patton became the most prominent figure in U.S. armor doctrine. In December 1940, he staged a high-profile mass exercise in which 1,000 tanks and vehicles were driven from Columbus, Georgia, to Panama City, Florida, and back. He repeated the exercise with his entire division of 1,300 vehicles the next month. Patton earned a pilot's license and, during these maneuvers, observed the movements of his vehicles from the air to find ways to deploy them effectively in combat. His exploits earned him a spot on the cover of Life magazine.

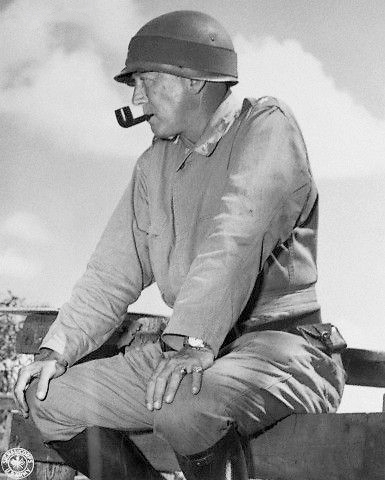
Major General George S. Patton sitting on a fence and smoking a pipe while observing 1941 maneuvers in Louisiana

General Patton led the division during the Tennessee Maneuvers in June 1941, and was lauded for his leadership, executing 48 hours' worth of planned objectives in only nine. During the September Louisiana Maneuvers, his division was part of the losing Red Army in Phase I, but in Phase II was assigned to the Blue Army. His division executed a 400-mile (640 km) end run around the Red Army and "captured" Shreveport, Louisiana. During the October–November Carolina Maneuvers, Patton's division captured the now Lieutenant General Drum, who served as the commander of the opposing army. The general was greatly embarrassed and became the subject of mockery. After soldiers from Isaac D. White's battalion detained Drum, the exercise umpires ruled that the circumstances would not have transpired in combat, so he was allowed to return to his headquarters, enabling the exercise to continue and for Drum to save face. Despite the umpires' actions, the incident indicated to senior leaders that Hugh Drum might not be prepared to command large bodies of troops under the modern battlefield conditions the Army would face in World War II, thus, he was not considered for field command. (Note: Drum's capture was the inspiration for a scene in the 1967 film The Dirty Dozen.)

On 15 January 1942, a few weeks after the American entry into World War II, he succeeded Scott as commander of I Armored Corps, and the next month established the Desert Training Center in the Coachella Valley region of Riverside County in California, to run training exercises. He commenced these exercises in late 1941 and continued them into the summer of 1942. Patton chose a 10,000-acre (40 km^{2}) expanse of desert area about 50 miles (80 km) southeast of Palm Springs. From his first days as a commander, Patton strongly emphasized the need for armored forces to stay in constant contact with opposing forces. His instinctive preference for offensive movement was typified by an answer Patton gave to war correspondents in a 1944 press conference. In response to a question on whether the Third Army's rapid offensive across France should be slowed to reduce the number of U.S. casualties, Patton replied, "Whenever you slow anything down, you waste human lives." It was around this time that a reporter, after hearing a speech where Patton said that it took "blood and brains" to win in combat, began calling him "blood and guts". The nickname would follow him for the rest of his life. Soldiers under his command were known at times to have quipped, "our blood, his guts". Nonetheless, he was known to be admired widely by the men under his charge.

=== North African campaign ===
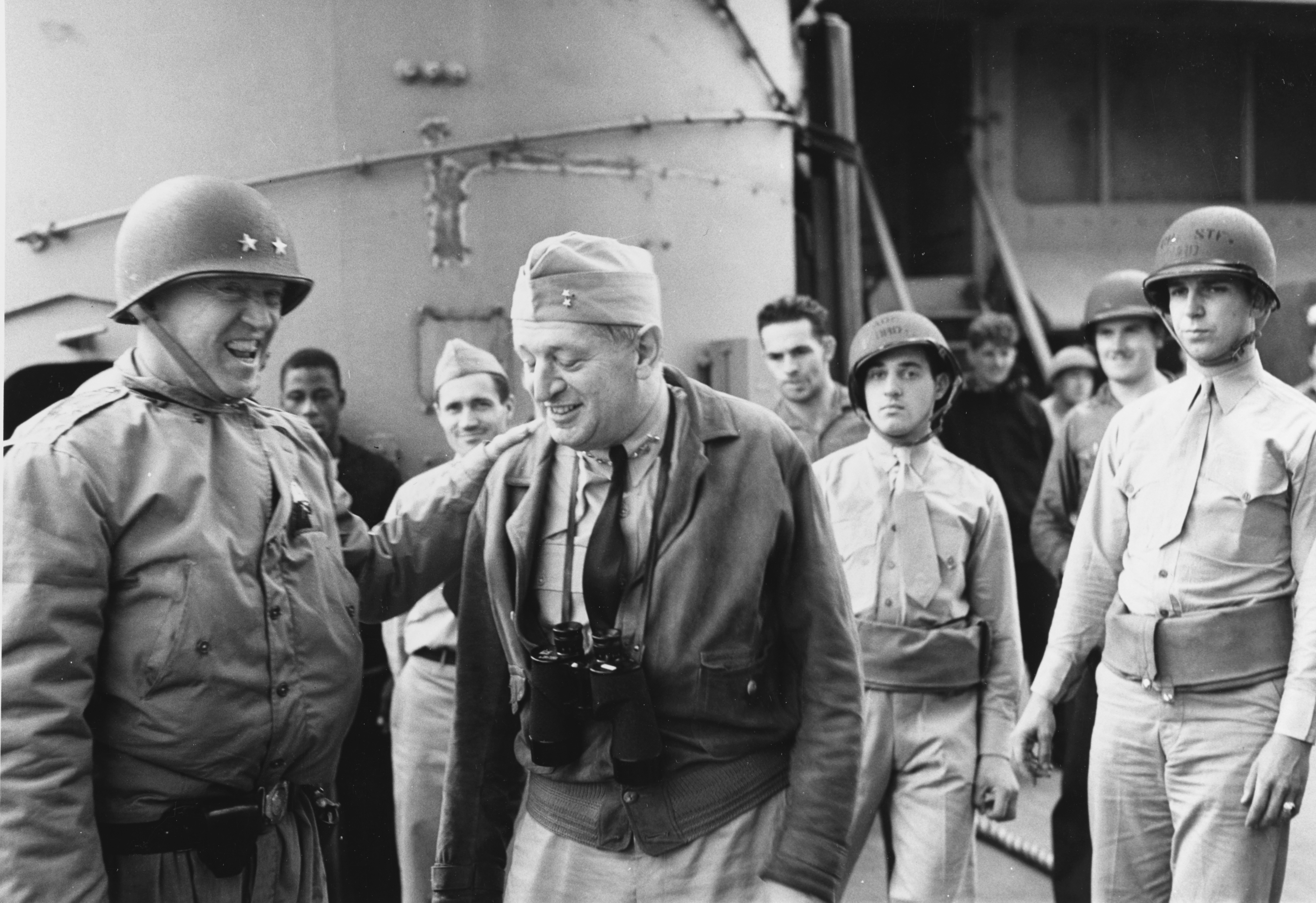
Patton (left) with Rear Admiral Henry Kent Hewitt aboard USS Augusta, off the coast of North Africa, November 1942

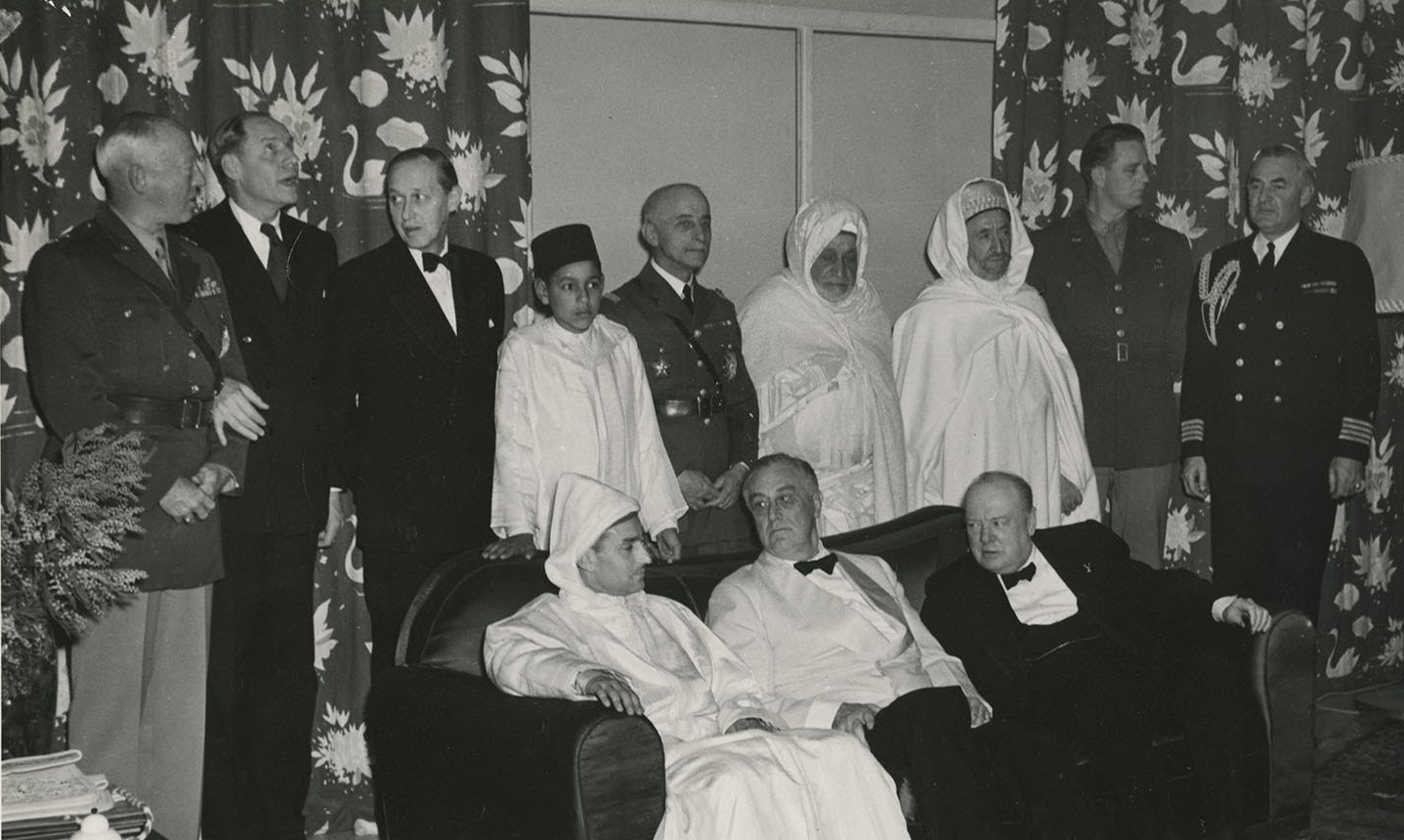
George S. Patton at the Casablanca Conference

Under Lieutenant General Dwight D. Eisenhower, the Supreme Allied Commander, Patton was assigned to help plan the Allied invasion of French North Africa as part of Operation Torch in the summer of 1942. Patton commanded the Western Task Force, consisting of 33,000 men in 100 ships, in landings centered on Casablanca, Morocco. The landings, which took place on 8 November 1942, were opposed by Vichy French forces, but Patton's men quickly gained a beachhead and pushed through fierce resistance. Casablanca fell on 11 November and Patton negotiated an armistice with French General Charles Noguès. The Sultan of Morocco was so impressed that he presented Patton with the Order of Ouissam Alaouite, with the citation "Les Lions dans leurs tanières tremblent en le voyant approcher" (The lions in their dens tremble at his approach). Patton oversaw the conversion of Casablanca into a military port and hosted the Casablanca Conference in January 1943.

On 6 March 1943, following the defeat of the U.S. II Corps by the German Afrika Korps, commanded by Generalfeldmarschall Erwin Rommel, at the Battle of Kasserine Pass, Patton replaced Major General Lloyd Fredendall as Commanding General of the II Corps and was promoted to lieutenant general. Soon thereafter, he had Major General Omar Bradley reassigned to his corps as its deputy commander. With orders to take the battered and demoralized formation into action in 10 days' time, Patton immediately introduced sweeping changes, ordering all soldiers to wear clean, pressed and complete uniforms, establishing rigorous schedules, and requiring strict adherence to military protocol. He continuously moved throughout the command talking with men, seeking to shape them into effective soldiers. He pushed them hard, and sought to reward them well for their accomplishments. His uncompromising leadership style is evidenced by his orders for an attack on a hill position near Gafsa, in which he ended by reportedly saying, "I expect to see such casualties among officers, particularly staff officers, as will convince me that a serious effort has been made to capture this objective."

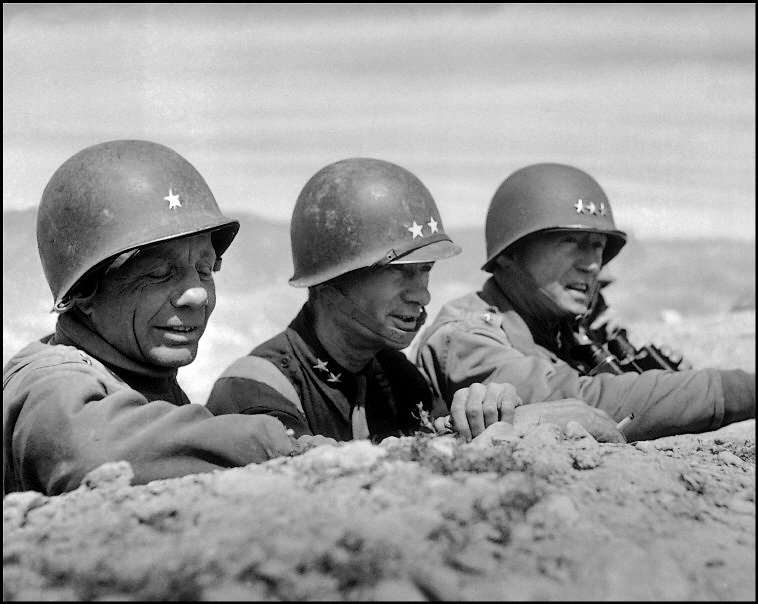
From left to right, Brigadier General Theodore Roosevelt Jr., Major General Terry Allen and Lieutenant General George S. Patton, March 1943

Patton's training was effective, and on 17 March, the U.S. 1st Infantry Division took Gafsa participating in the indecisive Battle of El Guettar, and pushing a German and Italian armored force back twice. In the meantime, on 5 April, he removed Major General Orlando Ward, commanding the 1st Armored Division, after its lackluster performance at Maknassy against numerically inferior German forces. Advancing on Gabès, Patton's corps pressured the Mareth Line. During this time, he reported to British General Sir Harold Alexander, commander of the 18th Army Group, and came into conflict with Air Vice Marshal Sir Arthur Coningham about the lack of close air support being provided for his troops. By the time his force reached Gabès, the Germans had abandoned it. He then relinquished command of II Corps to Bradley, and returned to the I Armored Corps in Casablanca to help plan Operation Husky, the Allied invasion of Sicily. Fearing U.S. troops would be sidelined, he convinced British commanders to allow them to continue fighting through to the end of the Tunisia Campaign before leaving on this new assignment.

=== Sicily campaign ===
For Operation Husky, the invasion of Sicily, Patton was to command the Seventh United States Army, dubbed the Western Task Force, in landings at Gela, Scoglitti and Licata to support landings by General Sir Bernard Montgomery's British Eighth Army. Patton's I Armored Corps was officially redesignated the Seventh Army just before his force of 90,000 landed before dawn on D-Day, 10 July 1943, on beaches near the town of Licata. The armada was hampered by wind and weather, but despite this the three U.S. infantry divisions involved, the 3rd, 1st, and 45th, secured their respective beaches. They then repulsed counterattacks at Gela, where Patton personally led his troops against German reinforcements from the Hermann Göring Division.

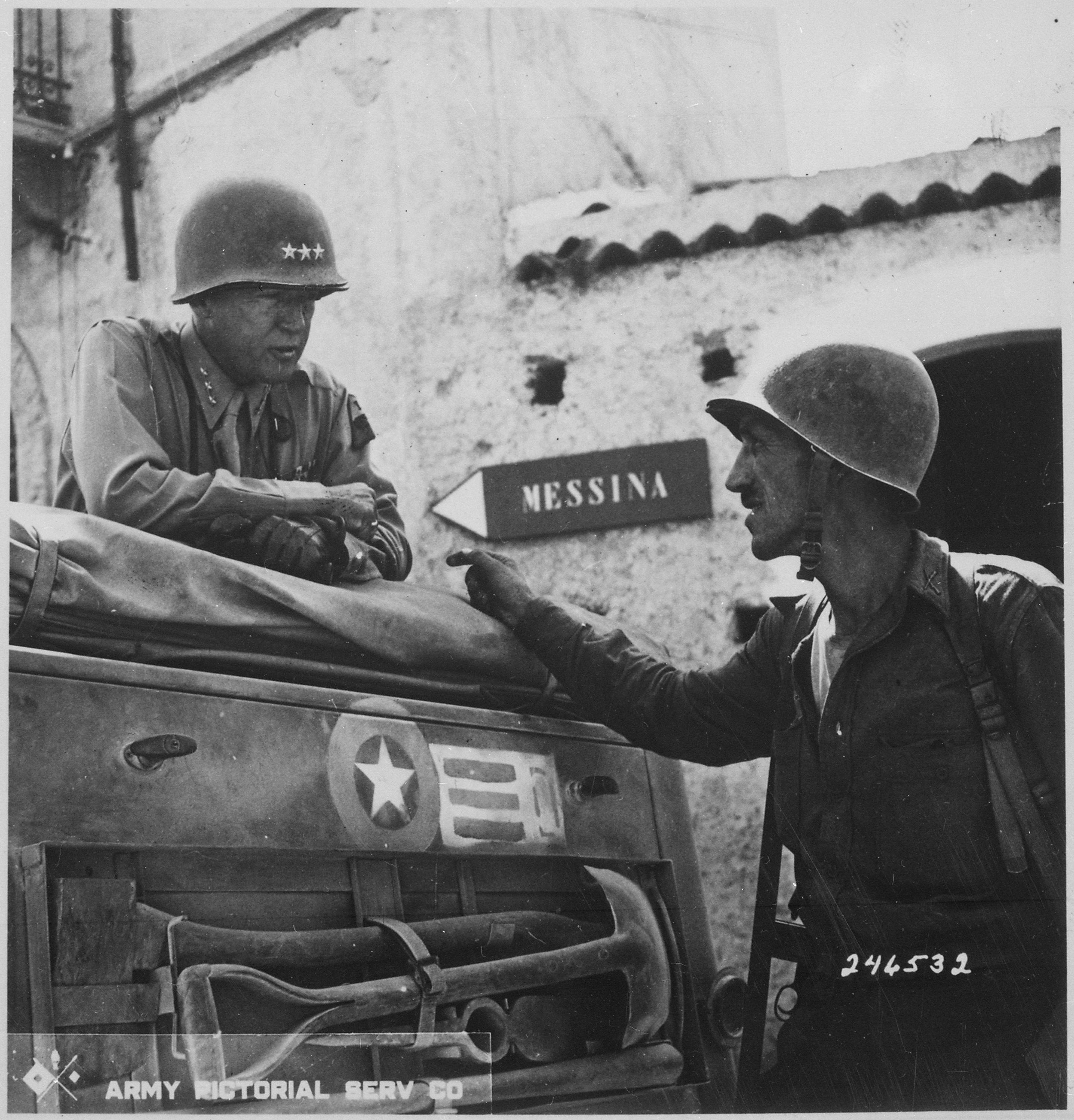
Lieutenant Colonel Lyle W. Bernard, commanding the 2nd Battalion, 30th Infantry Regiment, in conversation with Patton, near Brolo, Sicily, July 1943

Initially ordered to protect the British forces' left flank, Patton was granted permission by Alexander to take Palermo after Montgomery's forces became bogged down on the road to Messina. As part of a provisional corps under Major General Geoffrey Keyes, the 3rd Infantry Division under Major General Lucian Truscott covered 100 miles (160 km) in 72 hours, arriving at Palermo on 21 July. Patton then set his sights on Messina. He sought an amphibious assault, but it was delayed by lack of landing craft, and his troops did not land at Santo Stefano until 8 August, by which time the Germans and Italians had already evacuated the bulk of their troops to mainland Italy. He ordered more landings on 10 August by the 3rd Infantry Division, which took heavy casualties but pushed the German forces back, and hastened the advance on Messina. A third landing was completed on 16 August, and by 22:00 that day Messina fell to his forces. By the end of the battle, the 200,000-man Seventh Army had suffered 7,500 casualties, and killed or captured 113,000 Axis troops and destroyed 3,500 vehicles. Still, 40,000 German and 70,000 Italian troops escaped to Italy with 10,000 vehicles.

Patton's conduct in this campaign met with several controversies. He was also frequently in disagreement with Terry de la Mesa Allen Sr. and Theodore Roosevelt Jr. though often then conceding, to their relief, in line with Bradley's view.

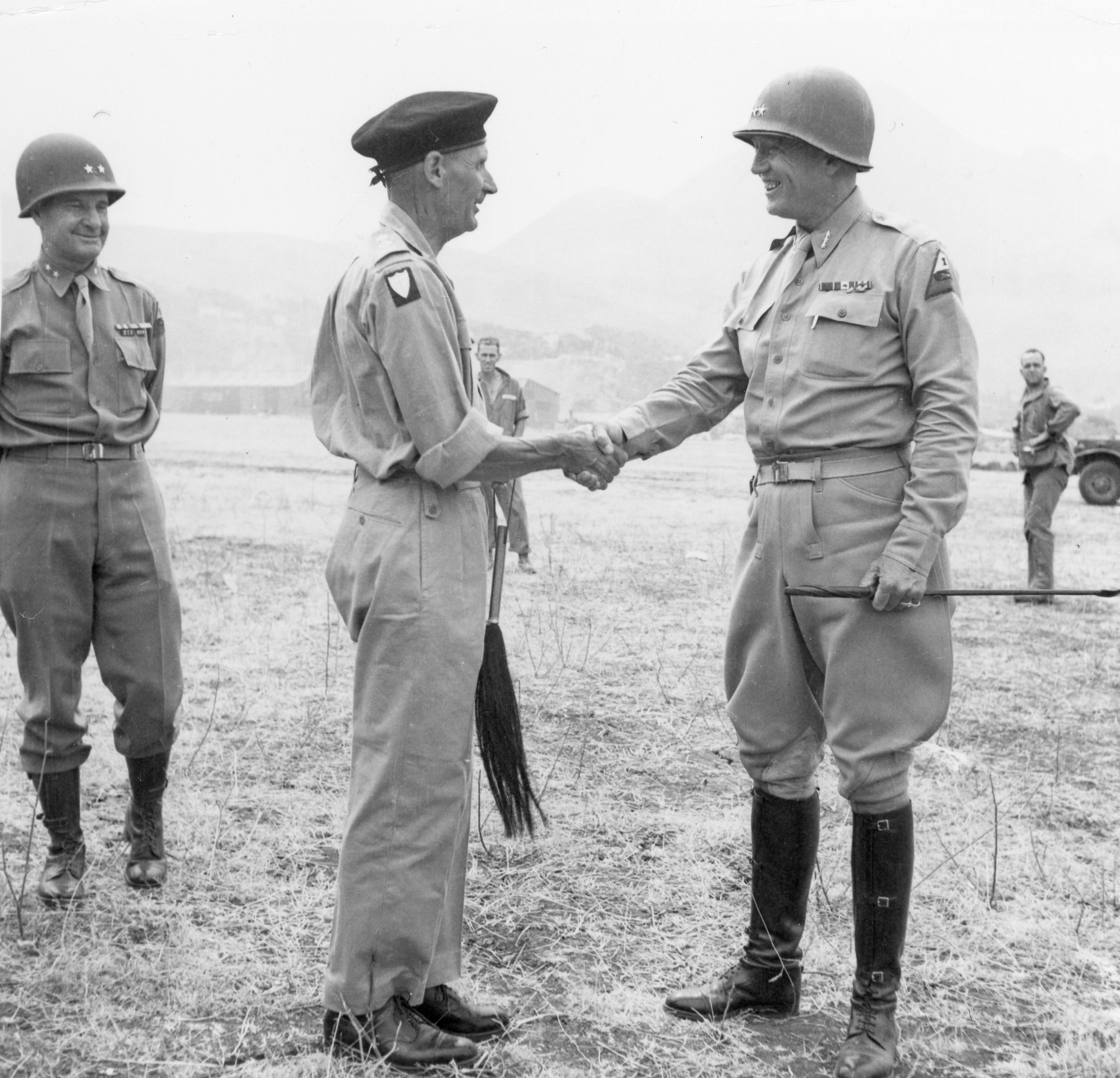
General Sir Bernard Montgomery shakes hands with Lieutenant General George S. Patton at an airport at Palermo, Sicily, 28 July 1943. Major General Geoffrey Keyes, deputy commander of Patton's Seventh Army, stands to the far left of the picture.

When Alexander sent a transmission on 19 July limiting Patton's attack on Palermo, his chief of staff, Brigadier General Hobart R. Gay, claimed the message was "lost in transmission" until Palermo had fallen.

In an incident on 22 July, while a U.S. armored column was under attack from German aircraft, he shot and killed a pair of mules that had stopped while pulling a cart across a bridge. The cart was blocking the way of the column. When their Sicilian owner protested, Patton attacked him with a walking stick and had his troops push the two mule carcasses off the bridge.

When informed of the Biscari massacre of prisoners, which was by troops under his command, Patton wrote in his diary, "I told Bradley that it was probably an exaggeration, but in any case to tell the officer to certify that the dead men were snipers or had attempted to escape or something, as it would make a stink in the press and also would make the civilians mad. Anyhow, they are dead, so nothing can be done about it." Bradley refused Patton's suggestions. Patton later changed his mind. After he learned that the 45th Division's Inspector General found "no provocation on the part of the prisoners ... They had been slaughtered," Patton is reported to have said: "Try the bastards."

Two soldiers were tried for the Biscari massacre, both of whom claimed in their defense that they were acting under orders from Patton not to take prisoners if enemy combatants continued to resist within two hundred yards of their position. Major General Everett Hughes, an old friend of Patton's, defended him, asserting that Patton had not "at any time advocated the destruction of prisoners of war under any circumstances." James J. Weingartner argues that Patton's innocence in inciting violence against prisoners of war is uncertain, stating that

The testimony of multiple witnesses indicated beyond a reasonable doubt that Patton had urged the killing of enemy troops who continued to resist at close quarters, even if they offered to surrender. Patton probably wished his troops to deny quarter or refuse to accept the surrender of enemy combatants who continued to resist at close range, itself a violation of the laws of war (although common practice) by the twentieth century, but it should not be surprising if some Americans concluded that they were authorized to kill resolute enemy soldiers after they had placed themselves under American control.

No official action was taken against Patton for any complicity in the massacre.

=== Slapping incidents and aftermath ===
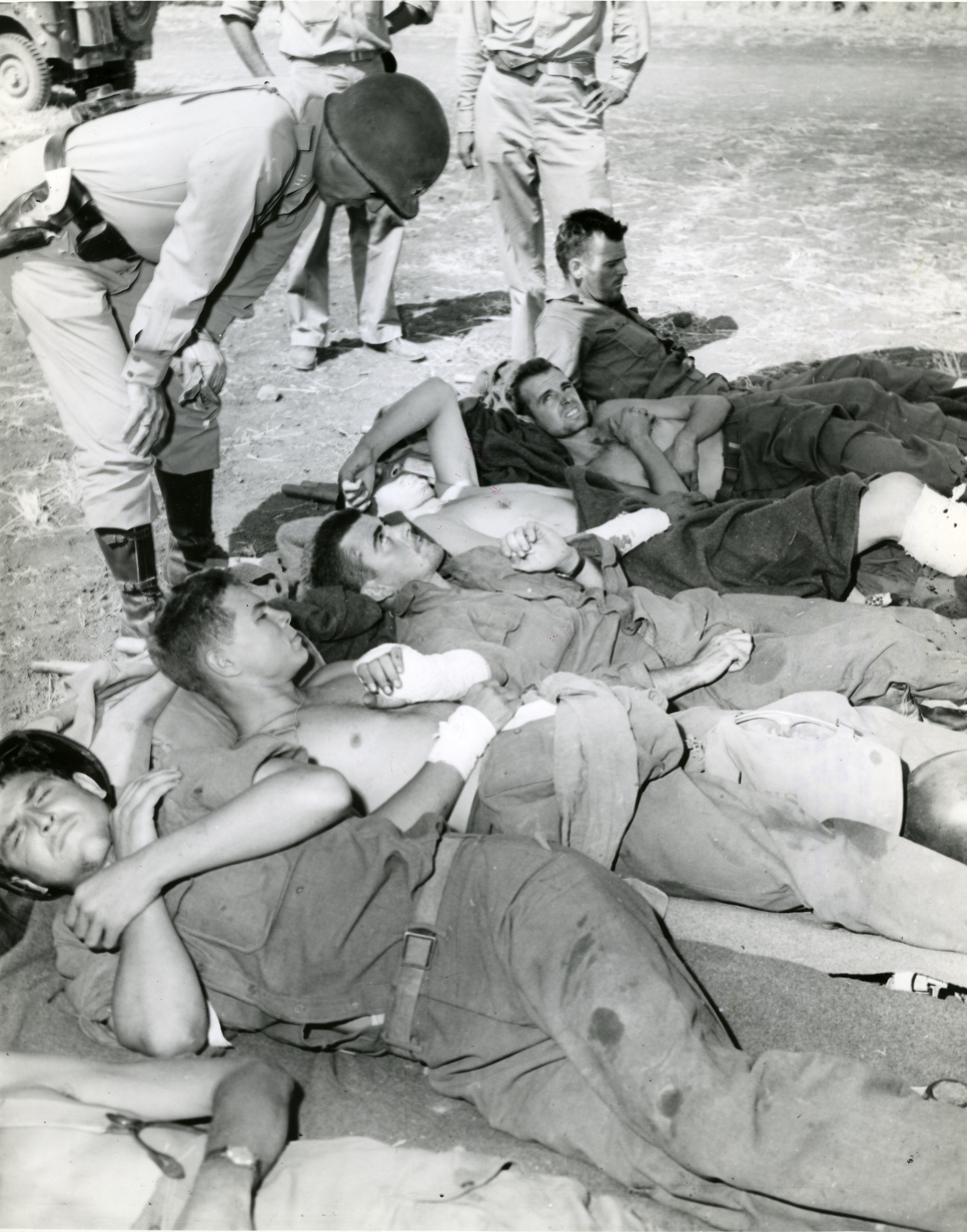
Patton talks to wounded soldiers preparing for evacuation.

Two high-profile incidents of Patton striking subordinates during the Sicily campaign attracted national controversy following the end of the campaign. On 3 August 1943, Patton slapped and verbally abused Private Charles H. Kuhl at an evacuation hospital in Nicosia after he had been found to suffer from "battle fatigue". On 10 August, Patton slapped Private Paul G. Bennett under similar circumstances. Ordering both soldiers back to the front lines, Patton railed against cowardice and issued orders to his commanders to discipline any soldier making similar complaints.

Word of the incident reached Eisenhower, who privately reprimanded Patton and insisted he apologize. Patton apologized to both soldiers individually, as well as to doctors who witnessed the incidents, and later to all of the soldiers under his command in several speeches. Eisenhower suppressed the incident in the media, but in November journalist Drew Pearson revealed it on his radio program. Criticism of Patton in the United States was harsh, and included members of Congress and former generals, Pershing among them. The views of the general public remained mixed on the matter, and eventually Secretary of War Henry L. Stimson stated that Patton must be retained as a commander because of the need for his "aggressive, winning leadership in the bitter battles which are to come before final victory."

Patton did not command a force in combat for 11 months. In September, Bradley, who was Patton's junior in both rank and experience, was selected to command the First United States Army forming in England to prepare for Operation Overlord. This decision had been made before the slapping incidents were made public, but Patton blamed them for his being denied the command. Eisenhower felt the invasion of Europe was too important to risk any uncertainty, and that the slapping incidents had been an example of Patton's inability to exercise discipline and self-control. While Eisenhower and Marshall both considered Patton to be a skilled combat commander, they felt Bradley was less impulsive and less prone to making mistakes. On 26 January 1944, Patton was formally given command of the U.S. Third Army in England, a newly formed field Army, and he was assigned to prepare its inexperienced soldiers for combat in Europe. This duty kept Patton busy during the first half of 1944.

=== Ghost Army ===
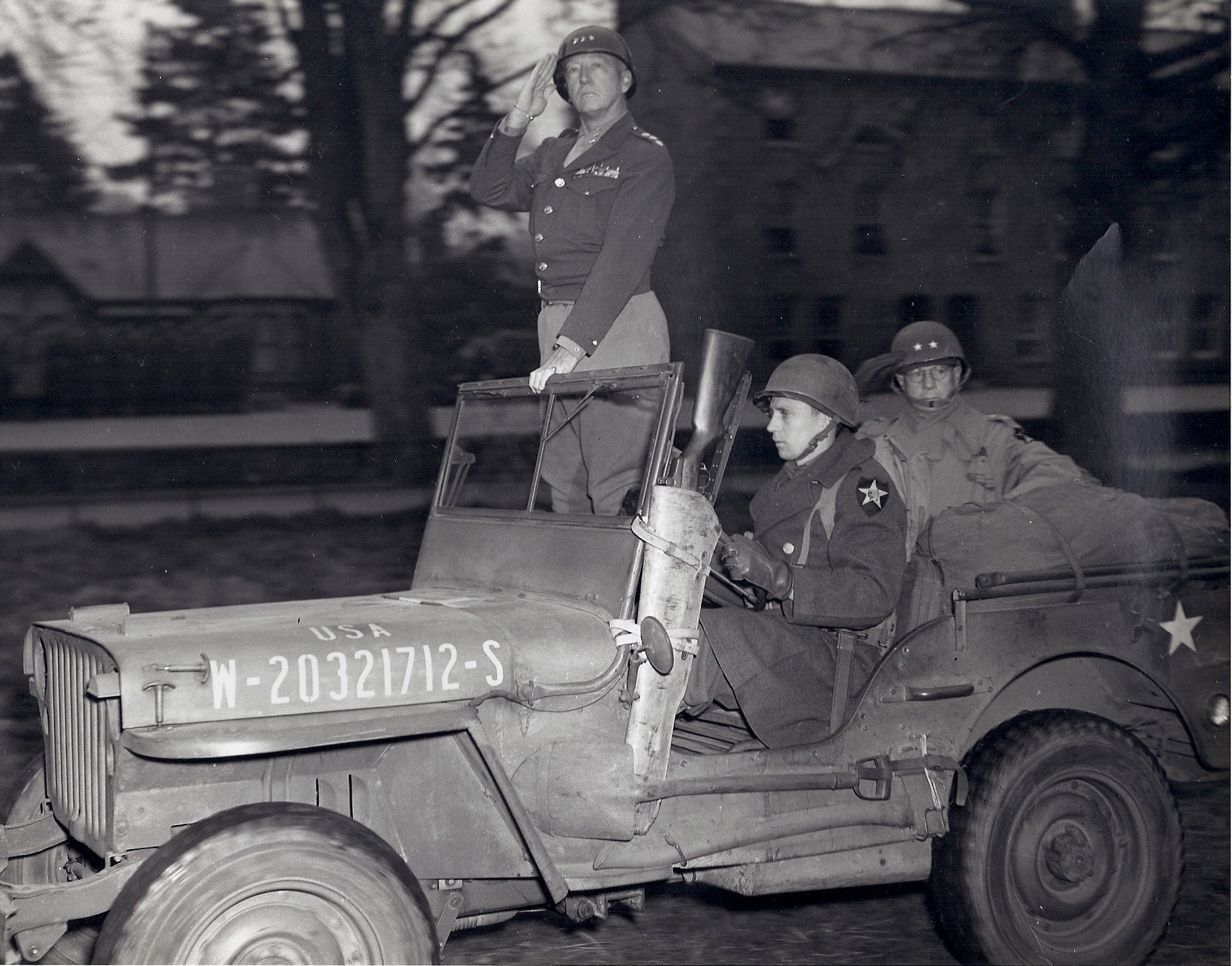
Major General Walter M. Robertson (back seat), commanding the 2nd Infantry Division, with Lieutenant General Patton pass in review of elements of Patton's Third Army in April 1944, prior to the Normandy invasion in June

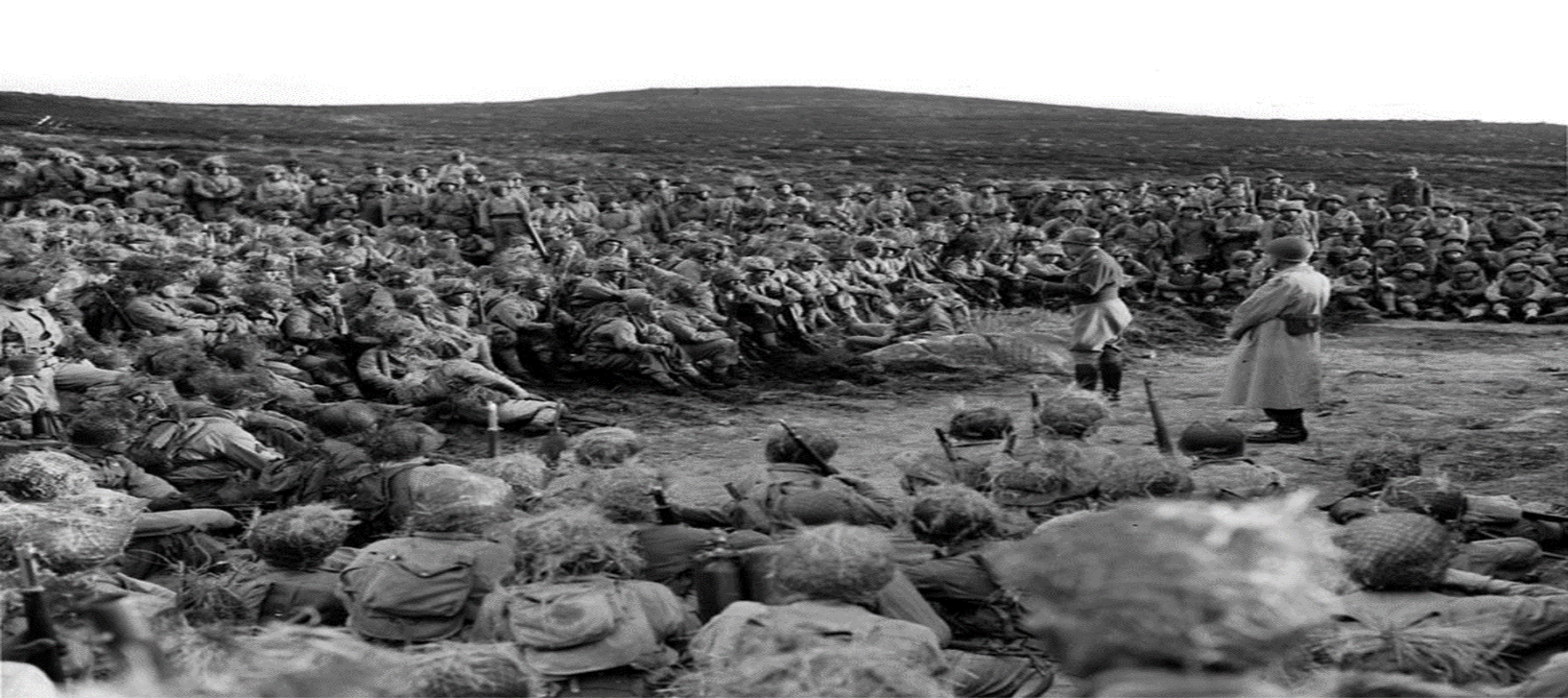
Address by Lieutenant General Patton in Northern Ireland, March 30, 1944, to men of the 10th Infantry Regiment, 5th Infantry Division, in preparation for the invasion of Normandy.

The German High Command had more respect for Patton than for any other Allied commander and considered him to be central to any plan to invade Europe from England. Because of this, Patton was made a prominent figure in the deception scheme Operation Fortitude during the first half of 1944. Through the British network of double-agents, the Allies fed German intelligence a steady stream of false reports about troop sightings and that Patton had been named commander of the First United States Army Group (FUSAG), all designed to convince the Germans that Patton was preparing this massive command for an invasion at Pas de Calais. FUSAG was in reality an intricately constructed fictitious army of decoys, props, and fake radio signal traffic based around Dover to mislead German reconnaissance planes and to make Axis leaders believe that a large force was massing there. This helped to mask the real location of the invasion in Normandy. Patton was ordered to keep a low profile to deceive the Germans into thinking that he was in Dover throughout early 1944, when he was actually training the Third Army. As a result of Operation Fortitude, the German 15th Army remained at the Pas de Calais to defend against Patton's supposed attack. So strong was their conviction that this was the main landing area that the German army held its position there even after the invasion of Normandy on 6 June 1944, believing it to be a diversionary force. Patton flew to France a month later, and then returned to combat command.

=== Normandy breakout offensive ===
Sailing to Normandy throughout July, Patton's Third Army formed on the extreme right (west) of the Allied land forces, (Note: Patton's friend Gilbert R. Cook was his deputy commander, whom Patton later had to relieve due to illness, a decision which "shook him to the core.") and became operational at noon on 1 August 1944, under Bradley's Twelfth United States Army Group. The Third Army simultaneously attacked west into Brittany, south, east toward the Seine, and north, assisting in trapping several hundred thousand German soldiers in the Falaise Pocket between Falaise and Argentan.

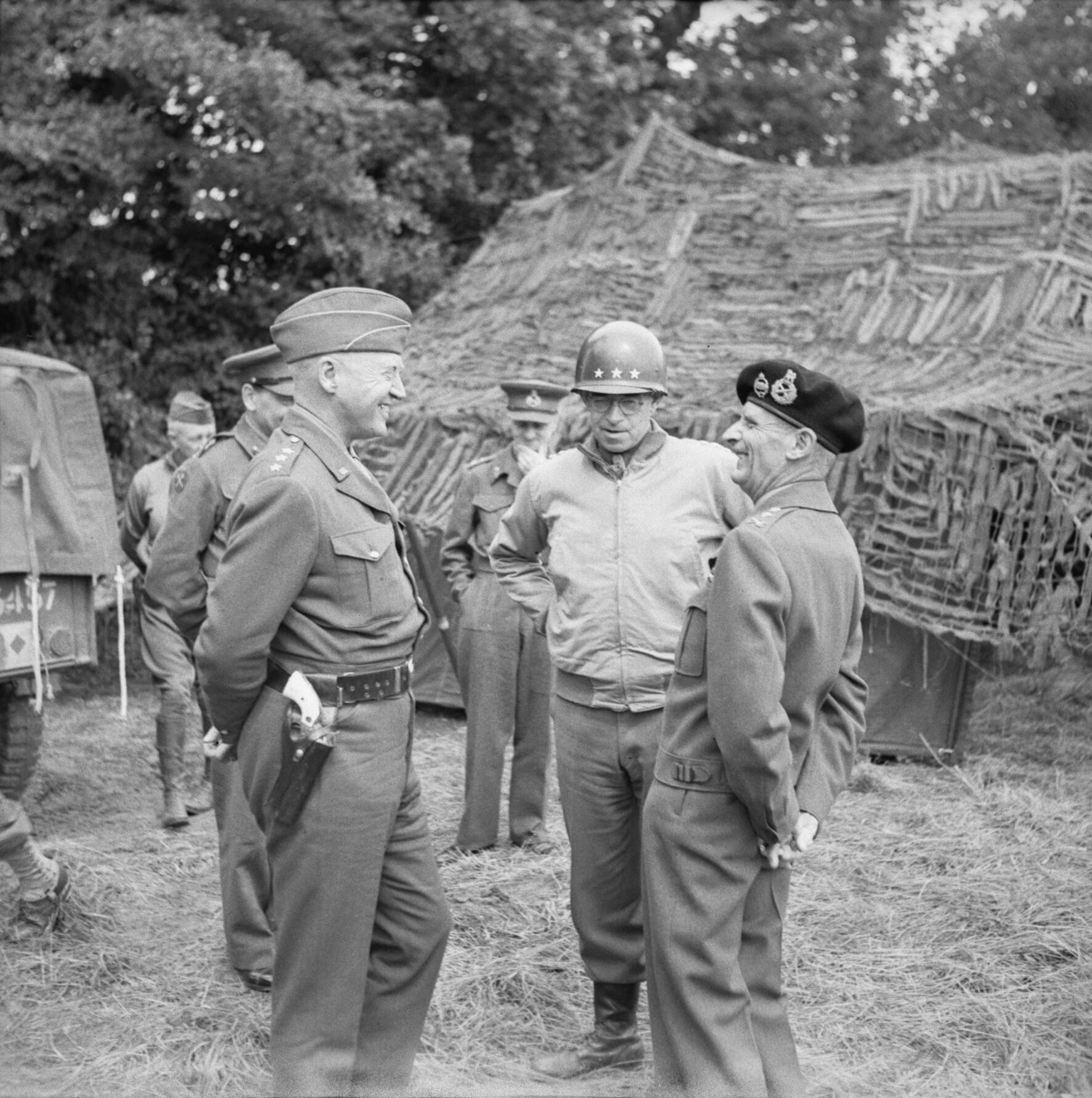
Bradley (center) with Patton (left) and Montgomery (right) at Montgomery's 21st Army Group HQ, Normandy, 7 July 1944

Patton's strategy with his army favored speed and aggressive offensive action, though his forces saw less opposition than did the other three Allied field armies in the initial weeks of its advance. The Third Army typically employed forward scout units to determine enemy strength and positions. Self-propelled artillery moved with the spearhead units and was sited well forward, ready to engage protected German positions with indirect fire. Light aircraft such as the Piper L-4 Cub served as artillery spotters and provided airborne reconnaissance. Once located, the armored infantry would attack using tanks as infantry support. Other armored units would then break through enemy lines and exploit any subsequent breach, constantly pressuring withdrawing German forces to prevent them from regrouping and reforming a cohesive defensive line. The U.S. armor advanced using reconnaissance by fire, and the .50 caliber M2 Browning heavy machine gun proved effective in this role, often flushing out and killing German panzerfaust teams waiting in ambush as well as breaking up German infantry assaults against the armored infantry.

The speed of the advance forced Patton's units to rely heavily on air reconnaissance and tactical air support. The Third Army had by far more military intelligence (G-2) officers at headquarters specifically designated to coordinate air strikes than any other army. Its attached close air support group was XIX Tactical Air Command, commanded by Brigadier General Otto P. Weyland. Developed originally by General Elwood Quesada of IX Tactical Air Command for the First Army in Operation Cobra, the technique of "armored column cover", in which close air support was directed by an air traffic controller in one of the attacking tanks, was used extensively by the Third Army. Each column was protected by a standing patrol of three to four P-47 and P-51 fighter-bombers as a combat air patrol (CAP).

In its advance from Avranches to Argentan, the Third Army traversed 60 miles (97 km) in just two weeks. Patton's force was supplemented by Ultra intelligence for which he was briefed daily by his G-2, Colonel Oscar Koch, who apprised him of German counterattacks, and where to concentrate his forces. Equally important to the advance of Third Army columns in northern France was the rapid advance of the supply echelons. Third Army logistics were overseen by Colonel Walter J. Muller, Patton's G-4, who emphasized flexibility, improvisation, and adaptation for Third Army supply echelons so forward units could rapidly exploit a breakthrough. Patton's rapid drive to Lorraine demonstrated his keen appreciation for the technological advantages of the U.S. Army. The major U.S. and Allied advantages were in mobility and air superiority. The U.S. Army had more trucks, more reliable tanks, and better radio communications, all of which contributed to a superior ability to operate at a rapid offensive pace.

=== Lorraine campaign ===
Patton's Third Army was sent to Lorraine. Despite its proximity to Germany, Lorraine was not the Allies' preferred invasion route in 1944. Except for its cities of Nancy and Metz the region contained few significant military objectives. Once the Third Army had penetrated Lorraine there would still be no first-rate military objectives on entering Germany. The Saar's industrial region, while significant, was of secondary importance when compared to the great Ruhr industrial complex farther north. Patton's offensive came to a halt on 31 August 1944, as the Third Army ran out of fuel near the Moselle River, just outside Metz. Patton expected that the theater commander would keep fuel and supplies flowing to support his advance, but Eisenhower favored a "broad front" approach to the ground-war effort, believing that a single thrust would have to drop off flank protection, and would quickly lose its punch.

Patton had planned to reach the River Moselle, leap it in one bound, bypass Metz and head straight for the Rhenish cities of Mainz and Mannheim, deep in the Third Reich but his units were restricted in fuel by the Broad front strategy, on one occasion receiving just 25,390 gallons of fuel; only one-eighteenth of what Patton had asked for. His units were also running short of ammunition. Still within the constraints of a very large effort overall, Eisenhower gave Montgomery and his Twenty First Army Group a higher priority for supplies for Operation Market Garden, although no supplies were diverted from Patton's Third Army. Three British transport companies were lent to American forces on 6 August for eight days not being returned until 4 September. The Third Army exhausted its fuel supplies, however after the Market Garden operation. According to Bradley there was parity of supplies between the three allied armies, Second British, First and Third US, by mid September 1944 and according to the official US Army History as cited on page 52 in Hugh Cole's book, The Lorraine Campaign, "by 10th September the period of critical [gasoline] shortage had ended". This was a whole week before Market Garden took place. The gasoline drought was the end of August/beginning of September.

The French rail network, which was repaired and quickly put to use, greatly aided the speed of the Third Army's logistical recovery. In eastern France the rail network was relatively undamaged by Allied aircraft and had been abandoned almost intact by the retreating Germans. The Third Army brought its railheads as far forward as Nancy. The French themselves operated the trains providing rolling stock and trained personnel to supplement the Third Army.

Patton believed his forces were close enough to the Siegfried Line that he remarked to Bradley that with 400,000 gallons of gasoline he could be in Germany within two days. In late September, a large German Panzer counterattack sent expressly to stop the advance of Patton's Third Army was defeated by the U.S. 4th Armored Division at the Battle of Arracourt. The German commanders believed this was because their counterattack had been successful.

External videos
- Booknotes interview with Carlo D'Este on Patton: A Genius for War, 28 January 1996, C-SPAN

The halt of the Third Army during the month of September was enough to allow the Germans to strengthen the fortress of Metz. Patton's forces reached the fortress at Metz on 5 September 1944, forcing a German surrender on 21 November 1944, taking over 10 weeks in the Battle of Metz with both sides suffering heavy casualties. Also an attempt by Patton to seize Fort Driant just south of Metz was defeated.

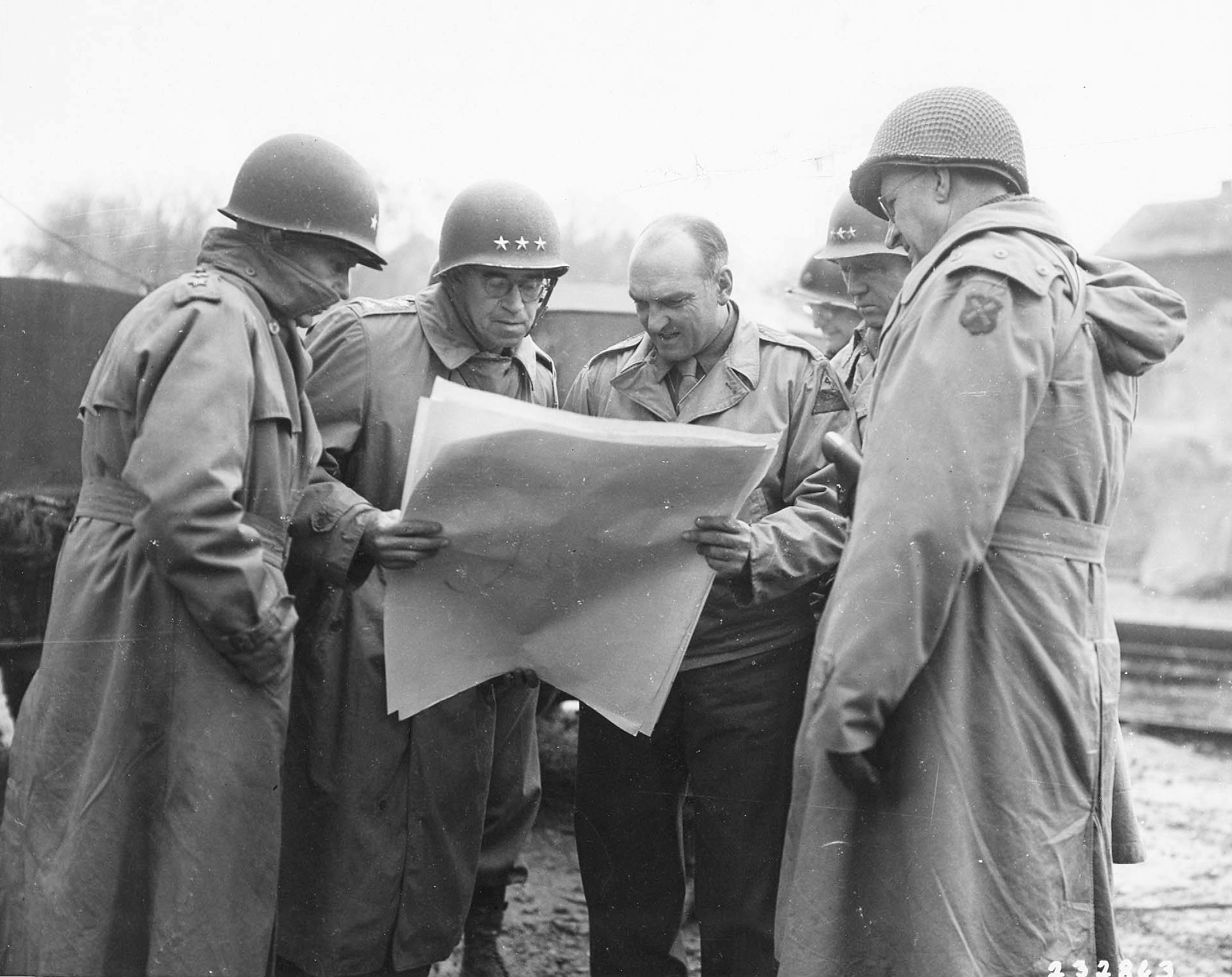
From left to right: Major General Leven C. Allen, Lieutenant General Omar Bradley, Major General John S. Wood, Lieutenant General George S. Patton and Major General Manton S. Eddy being shown a map by one of Patton's armored battalion commanders during a tour near Metz, France, November 1944

Patton's decisions in taking this city were criticized. German commanders interviewed after the war noted he could have bypassed the city and moved north to Luxembourg where he would have been able to cut off the German Seventh Army. The German commander of Metz, General Hermann Balck, also noted that a more direct attack would have resulted in a more decisive Allied victory in the city. Historian Carlo D'Este later wrote that the Lorraine campaign was one of Patton's least successful, faulting him for not deploying his divisions more aggressively and decisively. Patton remained frustrated at the lack of progress of his forces. From 8 November to 15 December, his army advanced no more than 40 miles (64 km).

In The Lorraine Campaign An Overview, September–December 1944, on page 36, Dr. Christopher R. Gabel of the Combat Studies Institute stated in February 1985:

Was the Lorraine campaign an American victory? From September through November, Third Army claimed to have inflicted over 180,000 casualties on the enemy. But to capture the province of Lorraine, a problem which involved an advance of only 40 to 60 air miles, Third Army required over 3 months and suffered 50,000 casualties, approximately one-third of the total number of casualties it sustained in the entire European war.

=== Battle of the Bulge ===
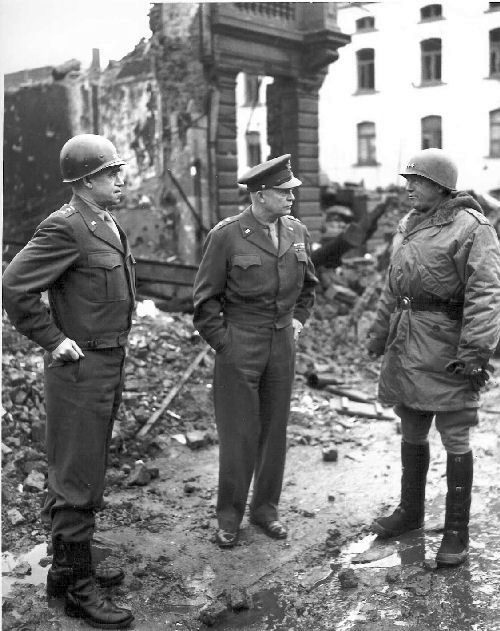
From left to right, Bradley, Eisenhower and Patton in Bastogne, Belgium, 1945

In December 1944, the German army, under the command of German Field Marshal Gerd von Rundstedt, launched a last-ditch offensive across Belgium, Luxembourg, and northeastern France. On 16 December 1944, it massed 29 divisions totaling 250,000 men at a weak point in the Allied lines, and during the early stages of the ensuing Battle of the Bulge, made significant headway towards the Meuse River during a severe winter. Eisenhower called a meeting of all senior Allied commanders on the Western Front at a headquarters near Verdun on the morning of 19 December to plan strategy and a response to the German assault.

At the time, Patton's Third Army was engaged in heavy fighting near Saarbrücken. Guessing the intent of the Allied command meeting, Patton ordered his staff to make three separate operational contingency orders to disengage elements of the Third Army from its present position and begin offensive operations toward several objectives in the area of the bulge occupied by German forces. At the Supreme Command conference, Eisenhower led the meeting, which was attended by Patton, Bradley, General Jacob Devers, Major General Kenneth Strong, Deputy Supreme Commander Air Chief Marshal Arthur Tedder, and several staff officers. When Eisenhower asked Patton how long it would take him to disengage six divisions of his Third Army and commence a counterattack north to relieve the U.S. 101st Airborne Division which had been trapped at Bastogne, Patton replied, "As soon as you're through with me." Patton then clarified that he had already worked up an operational order for a counterattack by three full divisions on 21 December, then only 48 hours away. Eisenhower was incredulous: "Don't be fatuous, George. If you try to go that early you won't have all three divisions ready and you'll go piecemeal." Patton replied that his staff already had a contingency operations order ready to go. Still unconvinced, Eisenhower ordered Patton to attack the morning of 22 December, using at least three divisions.

Patton left the conference room, phoned his command, and uttered two words: "Play ball." This code phrase initiated a prearranged operational order with Patton's staff, mobilizing three divisions—the 4th Armored Division, the 80th Infantry Division, and the 26th Infantry Division—from the Third Army and moving them north toward Bastogne. In all, Patton would reposition six full divisions, U.S. III Corps and U.S. XII Corps, from their positions on the Saar River front along a line stretching from Bastogne to Diekirch and to Echternach, the town in Luxembourg that had been at the southern end of the initial "Bulge" front line on 16 December. Within a few days, more than 133,000 Third Army vehicles were rerouted into an offensive that covered an average distance of over 11 miles (18 km) per vehicle, followed by support echelons carrying 62,000 tonnes (61,000 long tons; 68,000 short tons) of supplies.

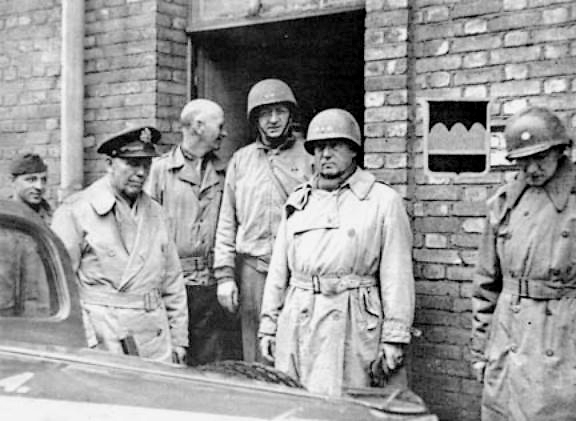
Shown from left to right are: an unidentified driver, General George C. Marshall, Major General Horace L. McBride, Major General Manton S. Eddy, Lieutenant General George S. Patton, and an unidentified aide.

On 21 December, Patton met with Bradley to review the impending advance, starting the meeting by remarking, "Brad, this time the Kraut's stuck his head in the meat grinder, and I've got hold of the handle." Patton then argued that his Third Army should attack toward Koblenz, cutting off the bulge at the base and trap the entirety of the German armies involved in the offensive. After briefly considering this, Bradley vetoed it, since he was less concerned about killing large numbers of Germans than he was in arranging for the relief of Bastogne before it was overrun. Desiring good weather for his advance, which would permit close ground support by U.S. Army Air Forces tactical aircraft, Patton ordered the Third Army chaplain, Colonel James Hugh O'Neill, to compose a suitable prayer. He responded with:

Almighty and most merciful Father, we humbly beseech Thee, of Thy great goodness, to restrain these immoderate rains with which we have had to contend. Grant us fair weather for Battle. Graciously hearken to us as soldiers who call upon Thee that, armed with Thy power, we may advance from victory to victory and crush the oppression and wickedness of our enemies, and establish Thy justice among men and nations. Amen.

When the weather cleared soon after, Patton awarded O'Neill a Bronze Star Medal on the spot.

On 26 December 1944, the first spearhead units of the Third Army's 4th Armored Division reached Bastogne, opening a corridor for relief and resupply of the besieged forces. Patton's ability to disengage six divisions from front line combat during the middle of winter, then wheel north to relieve Bastogne was one of his most remarkable achievements during the war. He later wrote that the relief of Bastogne was "the most brilliant operation we have thus far performed, and it is in my opinion the outstanding achievement of the war. This is my biggest battle."

=== Advance into Germany ===
By February, the Germans were in full retreat. On 23 February 1945, the U.S. 94th Infantry Division crossed the Saar River and established a vital bridgehead at Serrig, through which Patton pushed units into the Saarland. Patton had insisted upon an immediate crossing of the Saar River against the advice of his officers. Historians such as Charles Whiting have criticized this strategy as unnecessarily aggressive.

Once again, Patton found other commands given priority on gasoline and supplies. To obtain these, Third Army ordnance units passed themselves off as First Army personnel and in one incident they secured thousands of gallons of gasoline from a First Army dump. Between 29 January and 22 March, the Third Army took Trier, Koblenz, Bingen, Worms, Mainz, Kaiserslautern, and Ludwigshafen, killing or wounding 99,000 and capturing 140,112 German soldiers, which represented virtually all of the remnants of the German First and Seventh Armies. An example of Patton's sarcastic wit was broadcast when he received orders to bypass Trier, as it had been decided that four divisions would be needed to capture it. When the message arrived, Trier had already fallen. Patton rather caustically replied: "Have taken Trier with two divisions. Do you want me to give it back?"

The Third Army began crossing the Rhine River after constructing a pontoon bridge on 22 March, two weeks after the First Army crossed it at Remagen, and Patton slipped a division across the river that evening. Patton later boasted he had urinated into the river as he crossed.

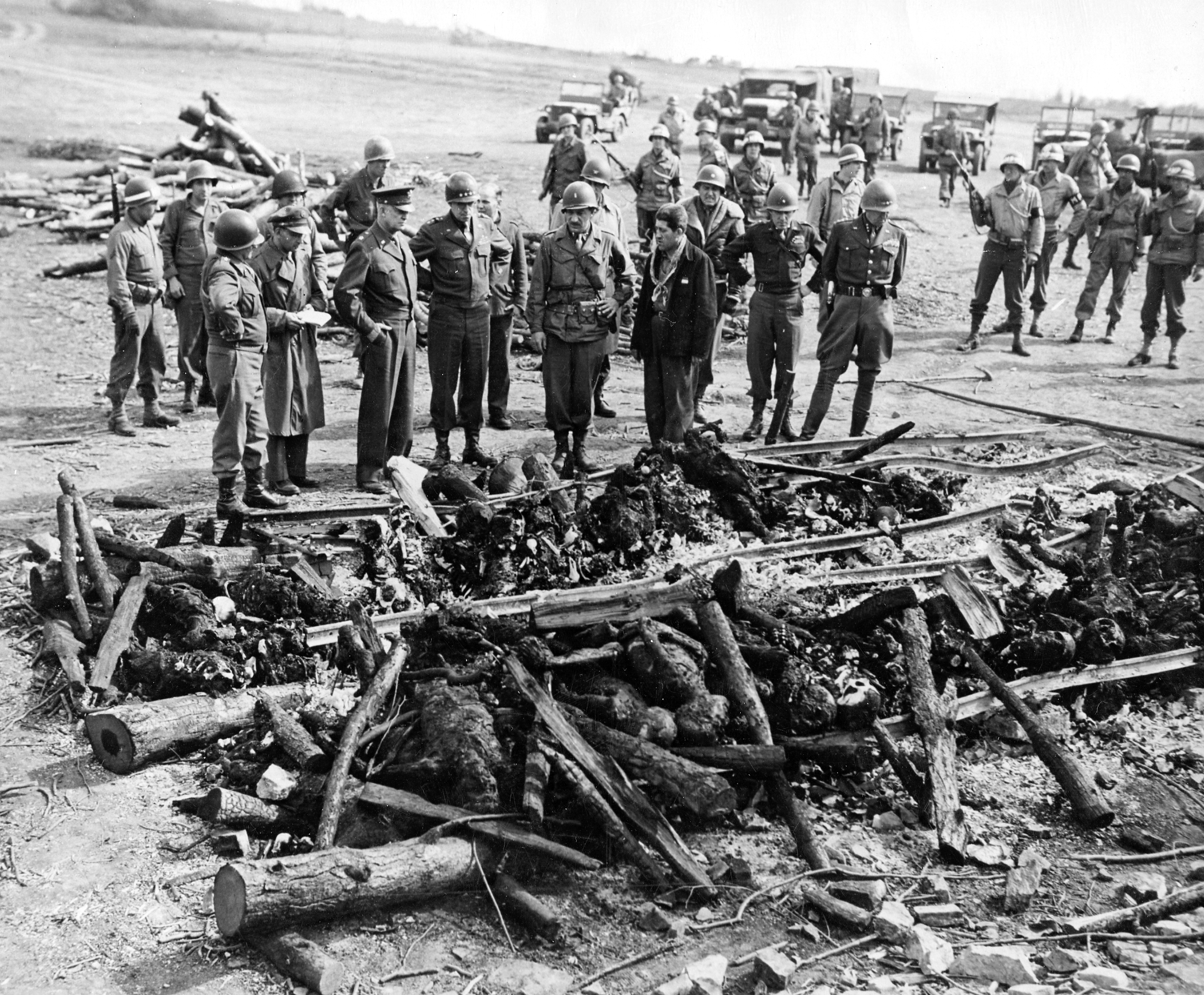
Eisenhower, Bradley and Patton inspect a cremation pyre at the Ohrdruf concentration camp on 12 April 1945, after liberation.

On 26 March 1945, Patton sent Task Force Baum, consisting of 314 men, 16 tanks, and assorted other vehicles, 50 miles (80 km) behind German lines to liberate the prisoner of war camp OFLAG XIII-B, near Hammelburg. Patton knew that one of the inmates was his son-in-law, Lieutenant Colonel John K. Waters. The raid was a failure, and only 35 men made it back; the rest were either killed or captured, and all 57 vehicles were lost. Patton reported this attempt to liberate Oflag XIII-B as the only mistake he made during World War II. When Eisenhower learned of the secret mission, he was furious. Patton later said he felt the correct decision would have been to send a Combat Command, which is a force about three times larger.

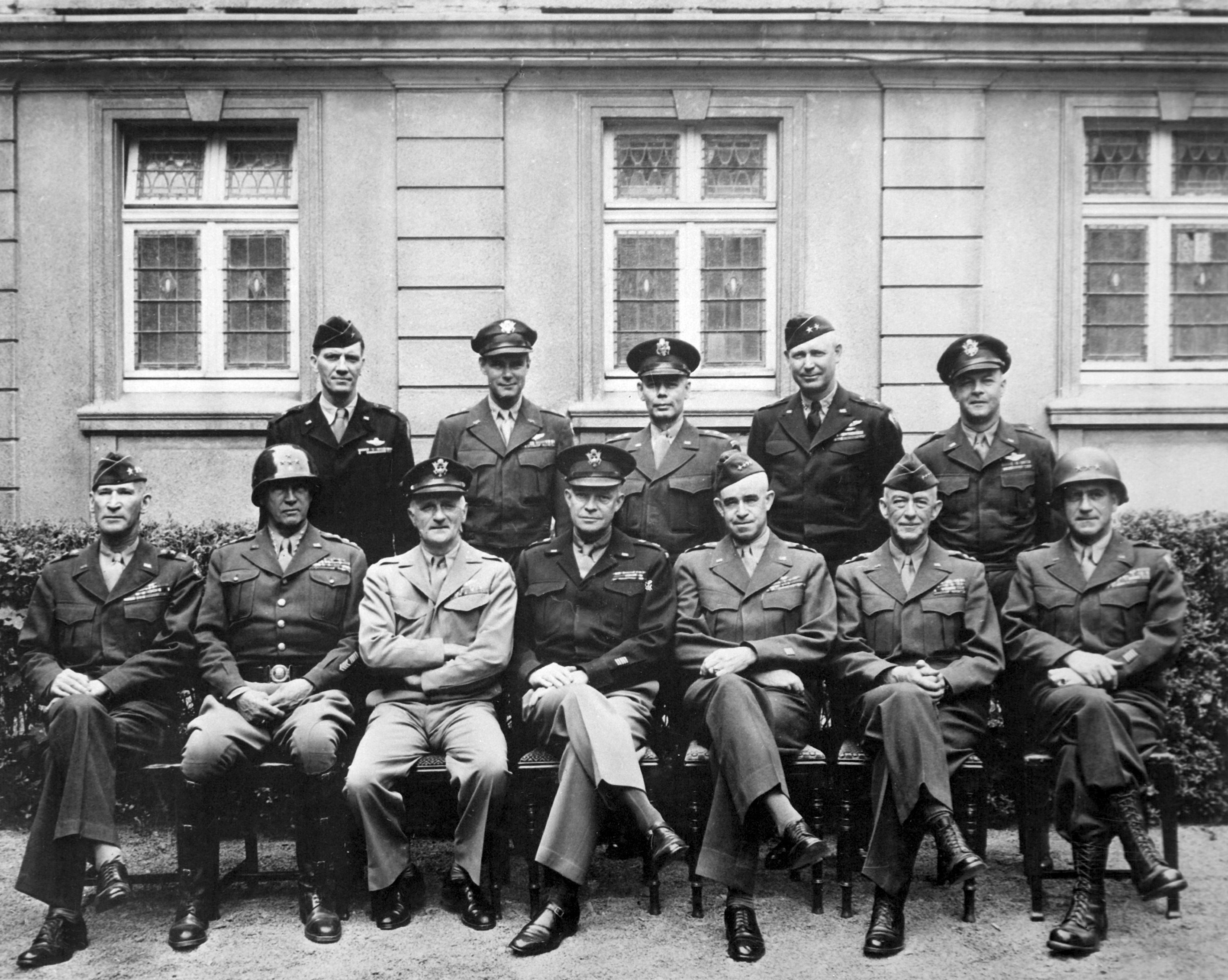
Senior American commanders of the European theater of World War II. Seated, from left to right, are William H. Simpson, George S. Patton, Carl A. Spaatz, Dwight D. Eisenhower, Omar Bradley, Courtney Hodges, and Leonard T. Gerow; standing are (from left to right) Ralph F. Stearley, Hoyt Vandenberg, Walter Bedell Smith, Otto P. Weyland, and Richard E. Nugent.

By April, resistance against the Third Army was tapering off, and the forces' main efforts turned to managing some 400,000 German prisoners of war. On 14 April 1945, Patton was promoted to general, a promotion long advocated by Stimson in recognition of Patton's battle accomplishments during 1944. Later that month, Patton, Bradley, and Eisenhower toured the Merkers salt mine as well as the Ohrdruf concentration camp, and seeing the conditions of the camp firsthand caused Patton great disgust. Third Army was ordered toward Bavaria and Czechoslovakia, anticipating a last stand by German forces there. He was reportedly appalled to learn that the Red Army would take Berlin, feeling that the Soviet Union was a threat to the U.S. Army's advance to Pilsen, but was stopped by Eisenhower from reaching Prague, Czechoslovakia, before V-E Day on 8 May and the end of the war in Europe.

In its advance from the Rhine to the Elbe, Patton's Third Army, which numbered between 250,000 and 300,000 men at any given time, captured 32,763 square miles (84,860 km^{2}) of German territory. Its losses were 2,102 killed, 7,954 wounded, and 1,591 missing. German losses in the fighting against the Third Army totaled 20,100 killed, 47,700 wounded, and 653,140 captured.

Between becoming operational in Normandy on 1 August 1944, and the end of hostilities on 9 May 1945, the Third Army was in continuous combat for 281 days. In that time, it crossed 24 major rivers and captured 81,500 square miles (211,000 km^{2}) of territory, including more than 12,000 cities and towns. The Third Army claimed to have killed, wounded, or captured 1,811,388 German soldiers, six times its strength in personnel. Fuller's review of Third Army records differs only in the number of enemies killed and wounded, stating that between 1 August 1944 and 9 May 1945, 47,500 of the enemy were killed, 115,700 wounded, and 1,280,688 captured, for a total of 1,443,888.

== Postwar ==
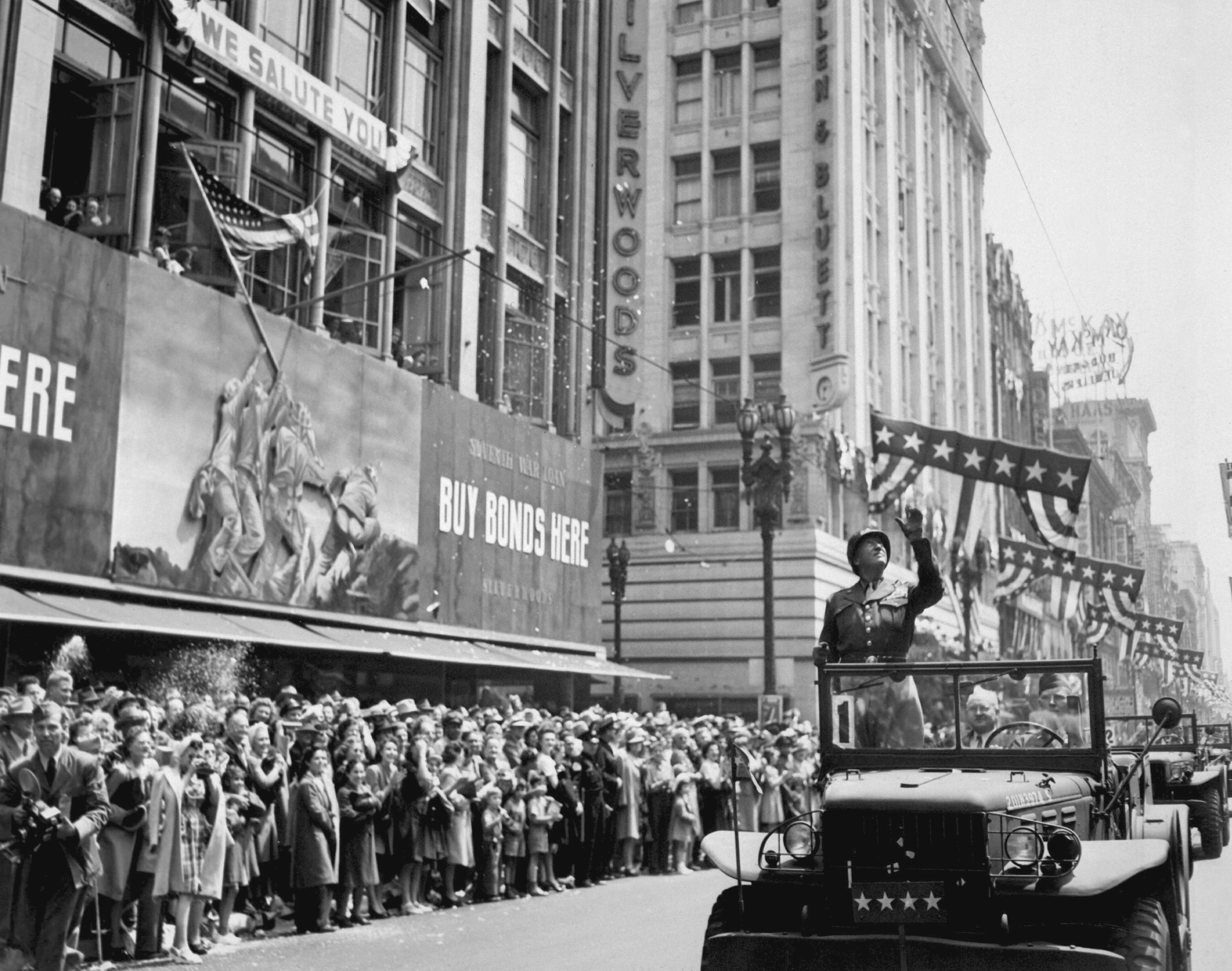
Patton during a welcome home parade in Los Angeles, 9 June 1945

Patton asked for a command in the Pacific War, begging Marshall to bring him to that war in any way possible. Marshall said he would be able to do so only if the Chinese secured a major port for his entry, an unlikely scenario. In mid-May, Patton flew to Paris, then London for rest. On 7 June, he arrived in Bedford, Massachusetts, for extended leave with his family, and was greeted by thousands of spectators. Patton then drove to Hatch Memorial Shell and spoke to some 20,000, including a crowd of 400 wounded Third Army veterans. In this speech he aroused some controversy among the Gold Star Mothers when he stated that a man who dies in battle is "frequently a fool," adding that the wounded are heroes. Patton spent time in Boston before visiting and speaking in Denver and visiting Los Angeles, where he spoke to a crowd of 100,000 at the Memorial Coliseum. On 14 June 1945, Secretary of War Henry L. Stimson decided that Patton would not be sent to the Pacific but would return to Europe in an occupation army assignment. Patton made a final stop in Washington, D.C., before returning to Europe in July to serve in the occupation forces.

Patton was appointed as military governor of Bavaria, where he led the Third Army in denazification efforts. Patton was particularly upset when learning of the end of the war against Japan, writing in his diary, "Yet another war has come to an end, and with it my usefulness to the world." Unhappy with his position and depressed by his belief that he would never fight in another war, Patton's behavior and statements became increasingly erratic. Various explanations beyond his disappointments have been proposed for Patton's behavior at this point. Carlo D'Este wrote that "it seems virtually inevitable ... that Patton experienced some type of brain damage from too many head injuries" from a lifetime of numerous auto- and horse-related accidents, especially one suffered while playing polo in 1936.

Patton's niece by marriage, Jean Gordon, spent some time together with him in London in 1944, and in Bavaria in 1945. Patton repeatedly boasted of his sexual success with Gordon, and his wife and family plainly believed that the two were lovers. Some of his biographers are skeptical. Hirshson said that the relationship was casual. Showalter believes that Patton, under severe physical and psychological stress, made up claims of sexual conquest to prove his virility. D'Este agrees that Patton's "behavior suggests that in both 1936 [in Hawaii] and 1944–45, the presence of the young and attractive Jean was a means of assuaging the anxieties of a middle-aged man troubled over his virility and a fear of aging." Whether or not Gordon was sexually involved with Patton, she also loved a young married captain, who returned to his wife in September 1945, leaving Gordon despondent; she committed suicide in January 1946.

=== Denazification controversy and antisemitism ===
Patton attracted controversy as military governor when it was noted that several former Nazi Party members continued to hold political posts in the region. Privately, Patton expressed a soldier's respect for the Germans as adversaries and a resistance to removing Nazi Party members from power. "I had never heard," he wrote to his wife Bea, "that we fought to de-Nazify Germany—live and learn. What we are doing is to utterly destroy the only semi-modern state in Europe so that Russia can swallow the whole ... Actually the Germans are the only decent people in Europe."

Patton, in his new role, oversaw the displaced persons camps in Bavaria, which contained a majority of Jews who had survived Germany's concentration camps in the Holocaust. He refused to have Jewish chaplains at his headquarters. Patton decided to keep the Jews detained, according to his diary, because he thought releasing them could lead to violence and re-arrests. He also resisted Eisenhower's orders to evict Germans from their homes in order to house Jews. After Patton accompanied Eisenhower to a Yom Kippur service in one of the camps, he referred to the Jews at the service as a "stinking mass of humanity" and complaining about their hygiene, said: "This happened to be the feast of Yom Kippur, so they were all collected in a large, wooden building, which they called a synagogue. It behooved General Eisenhower to make a speech to them. We entered the synagogue, which was packed with the greatest stinking bunch of humanity I have ever seen. When we got about halfway up, the head rabbi, who was dressed in a fur hat similar to that worn by Henry VIII of England and in a surplice heavily embroidered and very filthy, came down and met the General ... The smell was so terrible that I almost fainted and actually about three hours later lost my lunch as the result of remembering it ... Of course, I have seen them since the beginning and marveled that beings alleged to be made in the form of God can look the way they do or act the way they act." Patton also claimed that "There is a very Semitic influence in the press." "The noise against me is only the means by which the Jews and the Communists are attempting and with good success the further dismemberment of Germany." Biographer Martin Blumenson, who was Third Army Historian and also edited Patton's papers, sums up this period tersely: "Clearly, he had become delusional."

Patton continued to make numerous antisemitic comments. He remarked that displaced Jews were "locusts", "lower than animals", and "lost to all decency". In one diary entry, he wrote that Jews were "a subhuman species without any of the cultural or social refinements of our times."

=== Relieved of command ===
Patton faced questions from the press about his reluctance to denazify post-war Germany, but he noted that most of the people with experience in infrastructure management had been compelled to join the party in the war. He compared Nazis to Democrats and Republicans, bringing negative press stateside and angering Eisenhower. Eisenhower ordered him to hold a press conference correcting his statements, but Patton instead repeated them.

On 28 September 1945, after a heated exchange with Eisenhower over the denazification controversy, Patton was relieved of his military governorship. He was relieved of command of the Third Army on 7 October, and he concluded his farewell remarks by saying, "All good things must come to an end. The best thing that has ever happened to me thus far is the honor and privilege of having commanded the Third Army." Patton also believed Germany could be a strong ally against the Soviet Union. According to Anthony Cave Brown in Bodyguard of Lies, "Patton was relieved of command of the 3rd Army by Eisenhower just after the end of the war for stating publicly that America had been fighting the wrong enemy—Germany instead of Russia."

Patton's final assignment was to command the U.S. 15th Army based in Bad Nauheim. The 15th Army at this point consisted only of a small headquarters staff working to compile a history of the war in Europe. Patton had accepted the post because of his love of history, but he quickly lost interest. He began traveling, visiting Paris, Rennes, Chartres, Brussels, Metz, Reims, Luxembourg, and Verdun. Then he went to Stockholm, where he reunited with other athletes from the 1912 Olympics. Patton decided that he would leave his post at the 15th Army and not return to Europe once he left for Christmas leave on 10 December. He intended to discuss with his wife whether he would continue in a stateside post or retire from the Army.

Eisenhower returned to the United States to become the Chief of Staff of the US Army, and Patton was appointed interim commander of US Army Europe on 11 November 1945. He served in the position until relieved by General Joseph T. McNarney on 26 November.

=== Accident and death ===
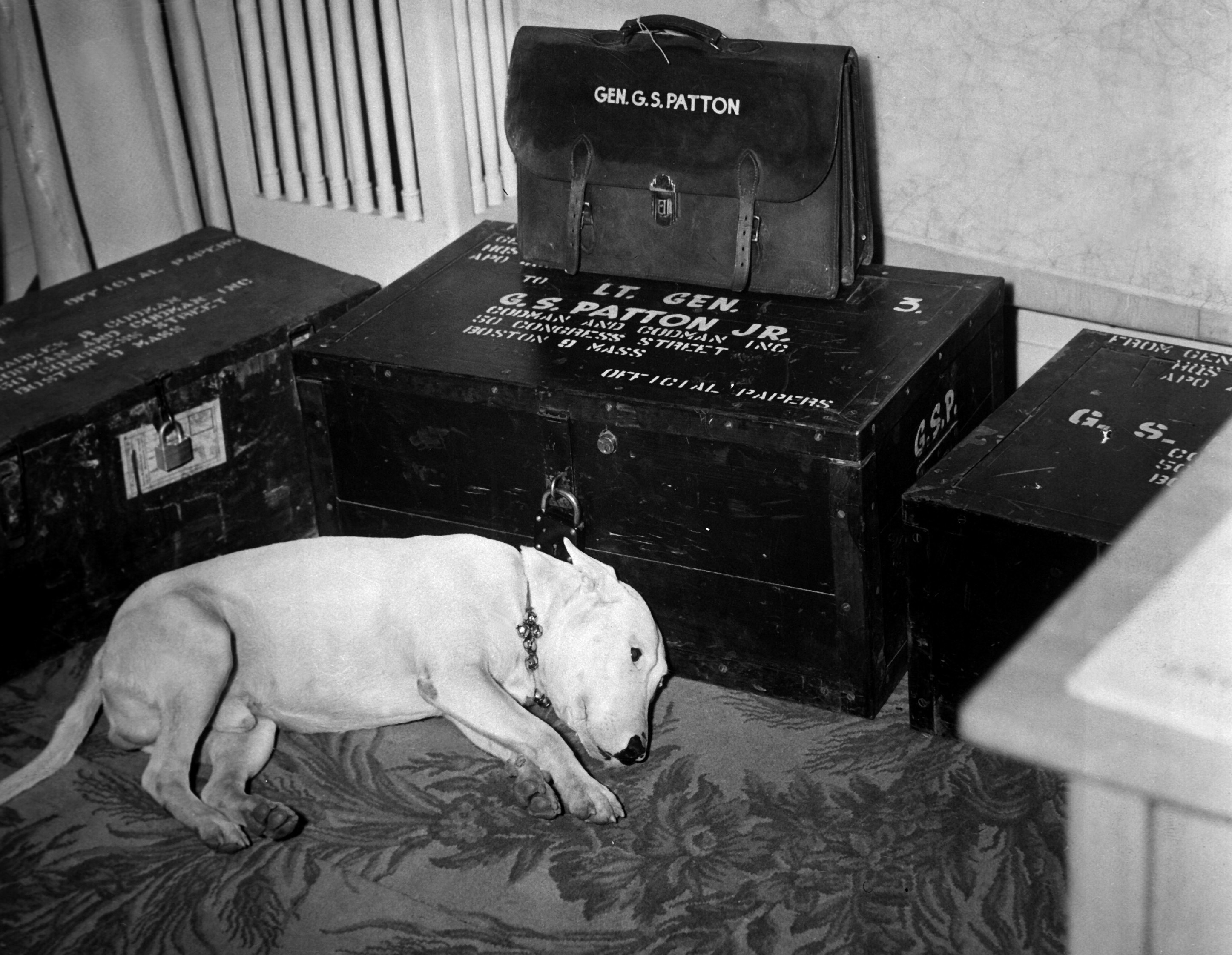
Patton's dog, Willie

Patton's chief of staff Major General Hobart Gay invited him on a pheasant hunting trip on December 9, 1945 near Speyer, Germany to lift his spirits. He noted derelict cars along the side of the road and said, "How awful war is. Think of the waste." Moments later, the 1938 Cadillac limousine in which they were driven by PFC Horace Woodring collided with an American army truck driven by T/5 Robert L. Thompson. Patton's regular driver was Sgt. Francis "Jeep" Sanza, but he had left the Army in November 1945.

Gay and others were only slightly injured, but Patton hit his head on the glass partition that separated the front and back seats. He began bleeding from a gash to the head and complained that he was paralyzed and having trouble breathing. He was taken to a hospital in Heidelberg where he was found to have a compression fracture and dislocation of the cervical third and fourth vertebrae, resulting in a broken neck and cervical spinal cord injury that rendered him paralyzed from the neck down.

Patton spent most of the next twelve days in spinal traction to decrease the pressure on his spine. All non-medical visitors were forbidden to see him, except for his wife Beatrice, who was flown in from the States. Patton was told he had no chance of ever riding a horse or resuming normal life again. To this he commented, "This is a hell of a way to die." He died in his sleep of congestive heart failure, pulmonary edema, and blood clot caused by paralysis at about 6:00 pm in Heidelberg on December 21, 1945 at the age of 60.

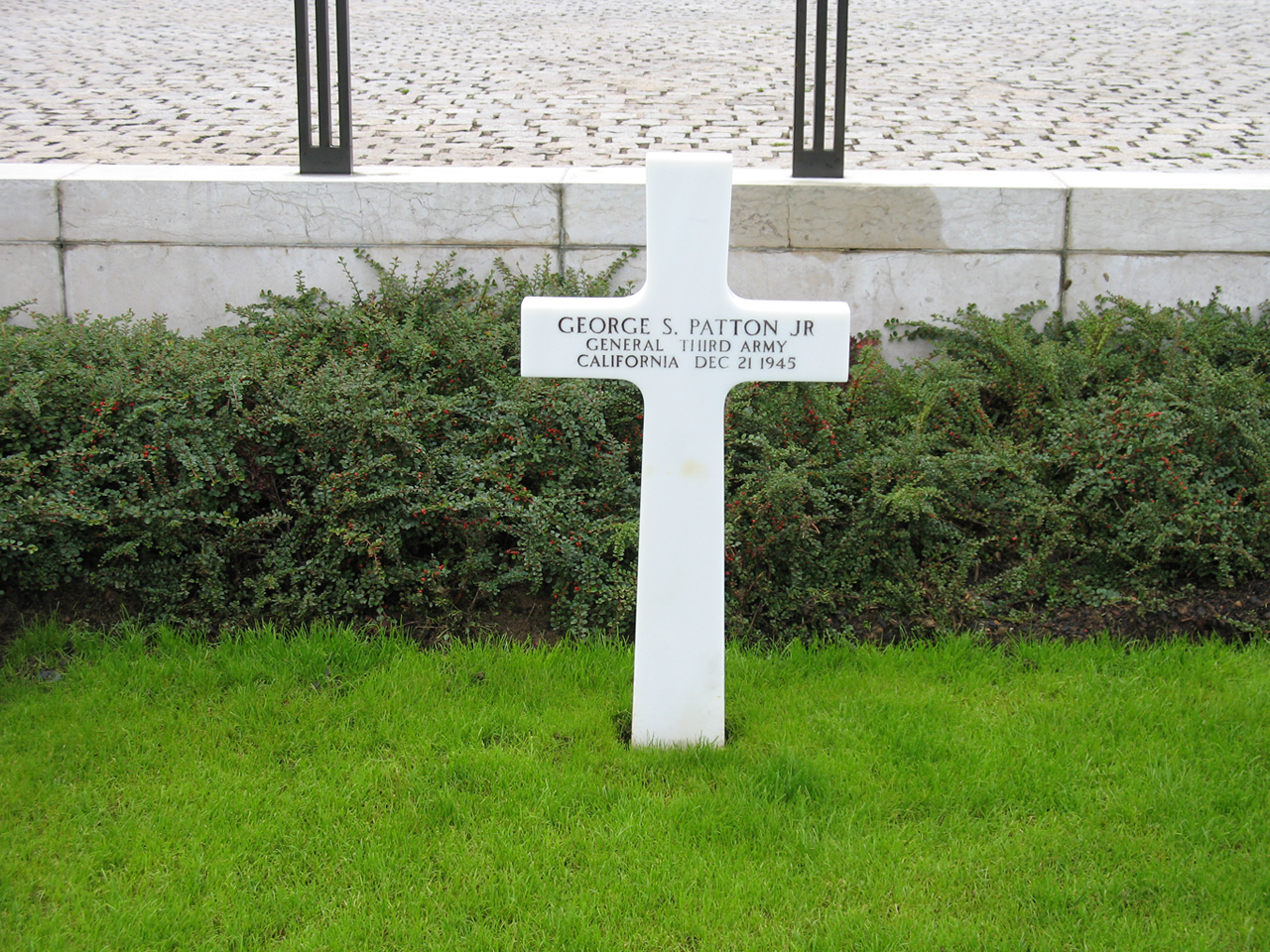
Patton's grave at the Luxembourg American Cemetery

On 24 December, Patton's body was buried at the American military cemetery in the Hamm district of Luxembourg City, alongside wartime casualties of the Third Army, in accordance with his request to be buried with his men. Initially in the middle of a plot like every other service member's, his grave was being visited by large numbers of people causing damage to the cemetery grounds, so his remains were moved to a location at the front of the plots, where his grave still is.

== Legacy ==
According to Martin Blumenson:

Patton epitomized the fighting soldier in World War II. He exercised unique leadership by his ability to obtain the utmost—some would say more than the maximum—response from American combat troops. Through his charisma, exemplified by a flamboyant and well-publicized image, he stimulated ... American troops to an aggressive desire to close with and destroy the enemy. He personified the offensive spirit, the ruthless drive, and the will for victory in battle ... As the outstanding exponent of combat effectiveness, particularly with respect to the employment of armored forces—that is, the combined use of tanks, motorized infantry, and self-propelled artillery, closely supported by tactical aircraft—Patton brought the blitzkrieg concept to perfection.

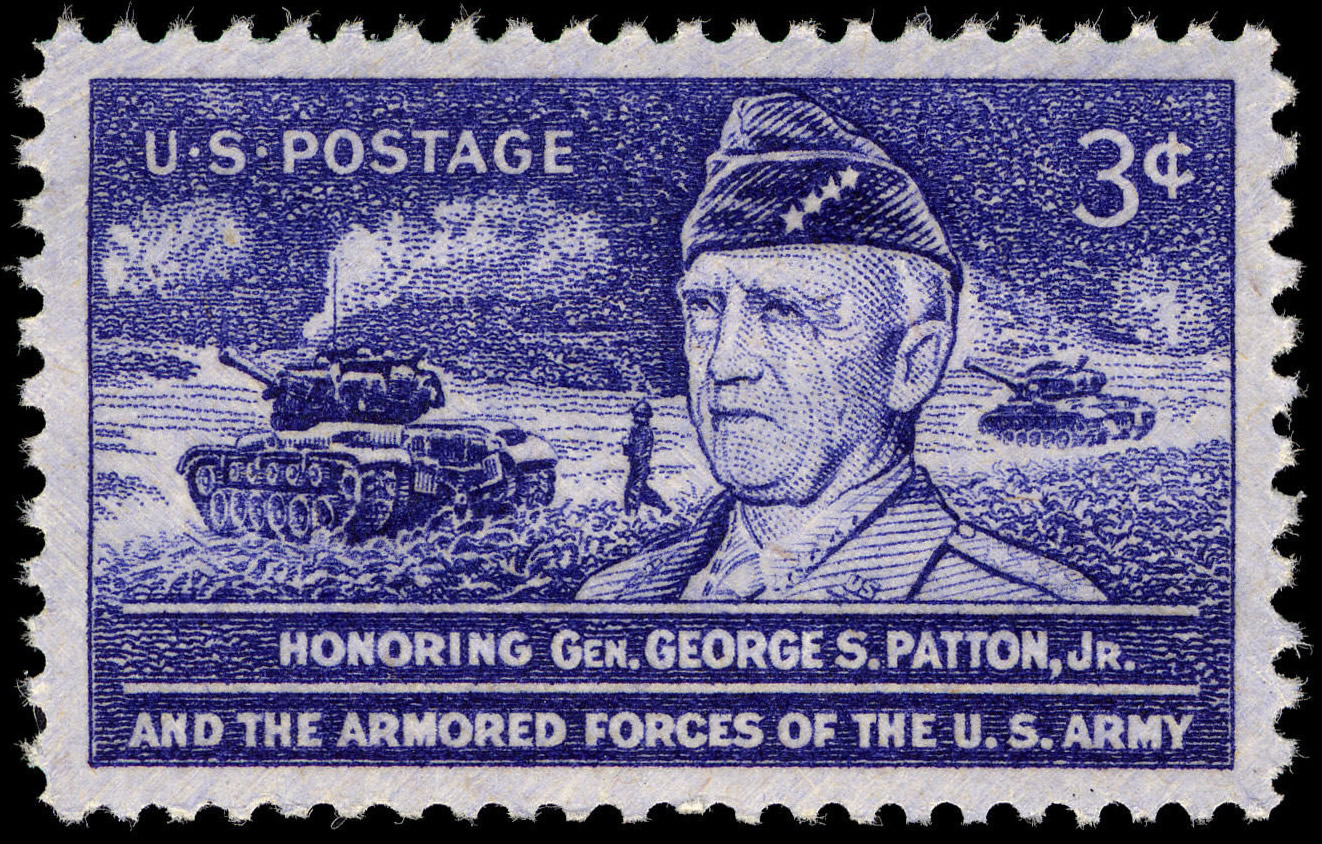
General Patton U.S. commemorative stamp, issued in 1953

Patton's colorful personality, hard-driving leadership style, and success as a commander produced a mixed and often contradictory image when coupled with his frequent political mis-steps. His great oratory skill is seen as integral to his ability to inspire troops under his command. Historian Terry Brighton concluded that Patton was "arrogant, publicity-seeking and personally flawed, but ... among the greatest generals of the war". His impact was substantial on armored warfare and leadership, with the U.S. Army adopting many of his aggressive strategies for its training programs following his death. Many military officers claim inspiration from his legacy. The first American tank designed after the war became the M46 Patton.

Several actors have portrayed Patton on screen, most famously George C. Scott in the 1970 film Patton, for which he won (and refused) the Academy Award for Best Actor. He reprised the role in 1986 in the made-for-television film The Last Days of Patton which tells the story of his last few months.

Other actors who have portrayed Patton include:

- Stephen McNally in the 1957 episode "The Patton Prayer" of the ABC religion anthology series Crossroads
- John Larch in the 1963 film Miracle of the White Stallions
- Kirk Douglas in the 1966 film Is Paris Burning?
- George Kennedy in the 1978 film Brass Target
- Darren McGavin in the 1979 miniseries Ike
- Robert Prentiss in the 1988 film Pancho Barnes
- Mitchell Ryan in the 1989 film Double Exposure: The Story of Margaret Bourke-White
- Lawrence Dobkin in a 1989 episode of the miniseries War and Remembrance
- Edward Asner in the 1997 film The Long Way Home
- Gerald McRaney in the 2004 miniseries Ike: Countdown to D-Day
- Dan Higgins in a 2006 episode of the miniseries Man, Moment, Machine
- Kelsey Grammer in the 2008 film An American Carol
- Ed Harris in Resistance (2020).

=== Image ===
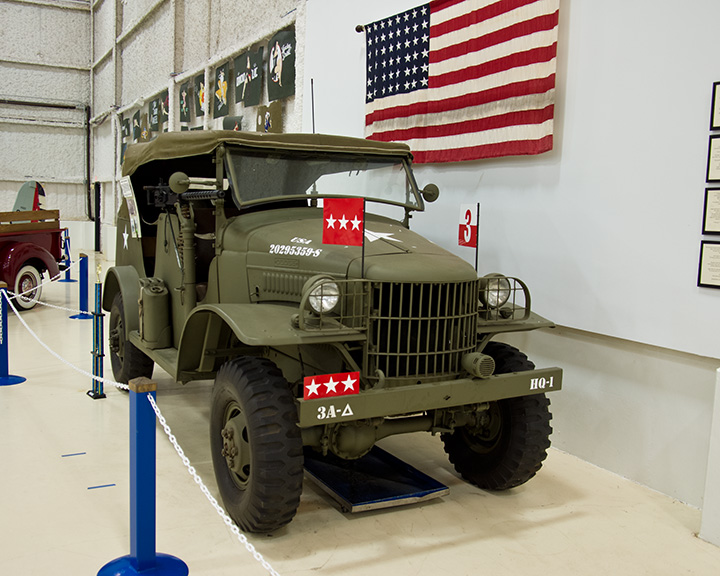
A replica of Patton's World War II command vehicle on display at the Lone Star Flight Museum in Houston, Texas

Patton cultivated a flashy, distinctive image in the belief that it would inspire his troops. He carried an ivory-gripped, engraved, silver-plated Colt Single Action Army .45 caliber revolver on his right hip, and frequently wore an ivory-gripped Smith & Wesson Model 27 .357 Magnum on his left hip. He was usually seen wearing a highly polished helmet, riding pants, and high cavalry boots. Patton also cultivated a stern expression he called his "war face". He was known to oversee training maneuvers from atop a tank painted red, white, and blue. His jeep bore oversized rank placards on the front and back, as well as a klaxon horn which would loudly announce his approach from afar. He proposed a new uniform for the emerging Tank Corps featuring polished buttons, a gold helmet, and thick, dark padded suits; the proposal was derided in the media as "the Green Hornet", and it was rejected by the Army.

Historian Alan Axelrod wrote that "for Patton, leadership was never simply about making plans and giving orders, it was about transforming oneself into a symbol". Patton intentionally expressed a conspicuous desire for glory, atypical of the officer corps of the day which emphasized blending in with troops on the battlefield. He was an admirer of Admiral Horatio Nelson for his actions in leading the Battle of Trafalgar in a full-dress uniform. Patton had a preoccupation with bravery, wearing his rank insignia conspicuously in combat, and at one point during World War II he rode atop a tank into a German-controlled village seeking to inspire courage in his men.

Patton was a staunch fatalist, and he believed in reincarnation. He believed that he might have been a military leader killed in action in Napoleon's army or a Roman legionary in a previous life.

Patton developed an ability to deliver charismatic speeches. He used profanity heavily in his speech, which generally was enjoyed by troops under his command, but it offended other generals, including Bradley. The most famous of his speeches were a series that he delivered to the Third Army prior to Operation Overlord. He was known for his bluntness and witticism; he once said, "The two most dangerous weapons the Germans have are our own armored halftrack and jeep. The halftrack because the boys in it go all heroic, thinking they are in a tank. The jeep because we have so many God-awful drivers." During the Battle of the Bulge, he famously remarked that the Allies should "let the sons-of-bitches [Germans] go all the way to Paris, then we'll cut them off and round them up." He also suggested facetiously that his Third Army could "drive the British back into the sea for another Dunkirk."

As media scrutiny increased on Patton, his bluntness stirred controversy. These began in North Africa when some reporters worried that he was becoming too close to former Vichy officials with Axis sympathies. His public image was more seriously damaged after the slapping incidents. Another controversy occurred prior to Operation Overlord when Patton spoke at a British welcoming club at Knutsford in England: "Since it is the evident destiny of the British and Americans, and of course, the Russians, to rule the world, the better we know each other, the better job we will do." The next day, news accounts misquoted him by leaving off the Russians. This was said to have "slap(ped) the face of every one of the United Nations except Great Britain", which nearly ended his career.

On a visit home after the war, he again made headlines when he attempted to honor several wounded veterans in a speech by calling them "the real heroes" of the war, unintentionally offending the families of soldiers who had been killed in action. His final media blowup occurred in September 1945 when he said, "Denazification would be like removing all the Republicans and all the Democrats who were in office, who had held office or were quasi-Democrats or Republicans and that would take some time." This caused Eisenhower to relieve him from command of the Third Army.

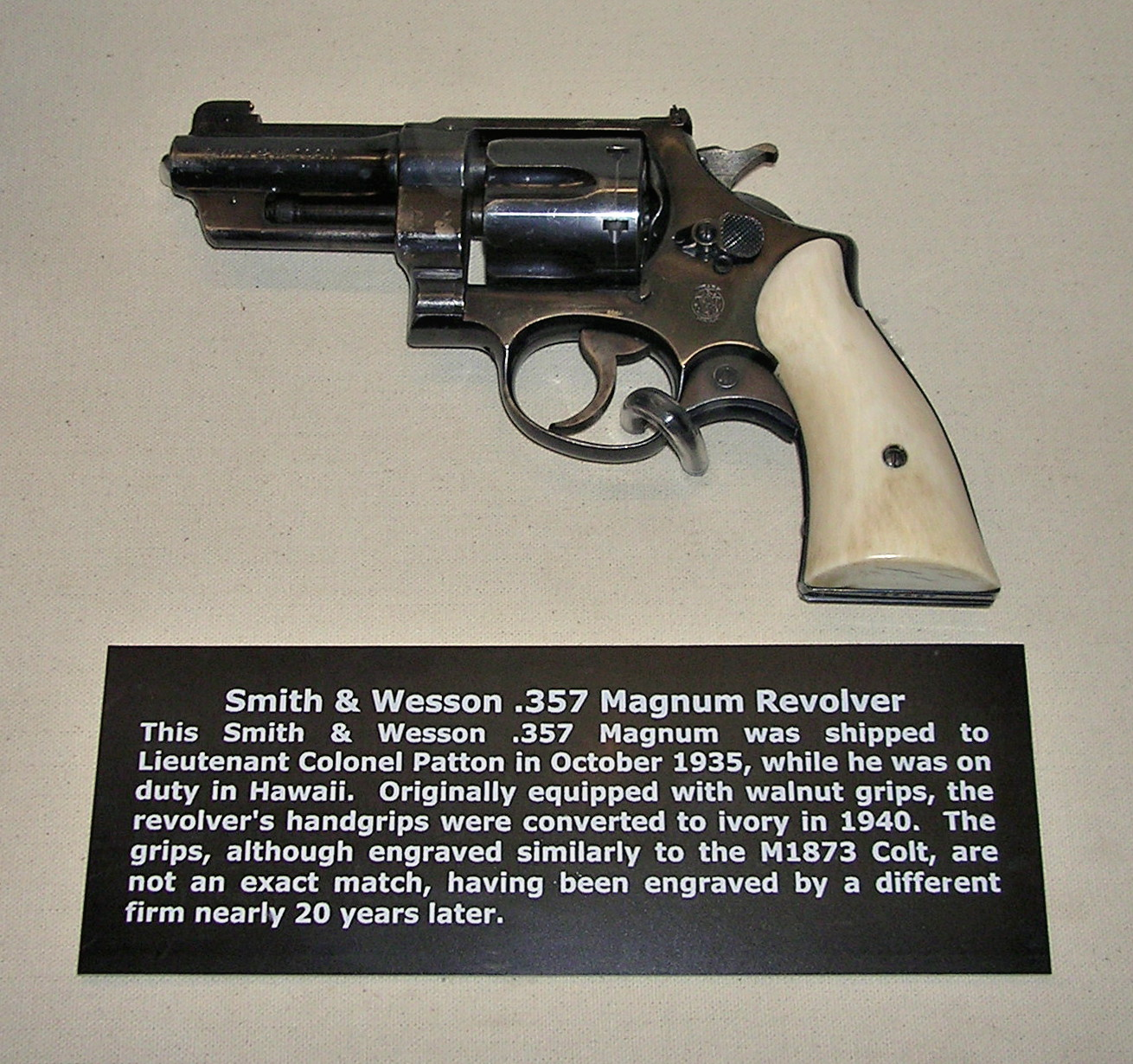
Patton's well-known custom ivory-handled revolver

As a leader, Patton was known to be highly critical, correcting subordinates mercilessly for the slightest infractions, but also quick to praise their accomplishments. He garnered a reputation as a general who was both impatient and impulsive and had little tolerance for officers who had failed to succeed. However, he fired only General Orlando Ward, and that after two warnings, whereas Bradley sacked several generals during the war. Patton reportedly had the utmost respect for the men serving in his command, particularly the wounded. Many of his directives showed special trouble to care for the enlisted men under his command, and he was well known for arranging extra supplies for battlefield soldiers, including blankets, extra socks, galoshes, and other items normally in short supply at the front.

=== Views on race ===
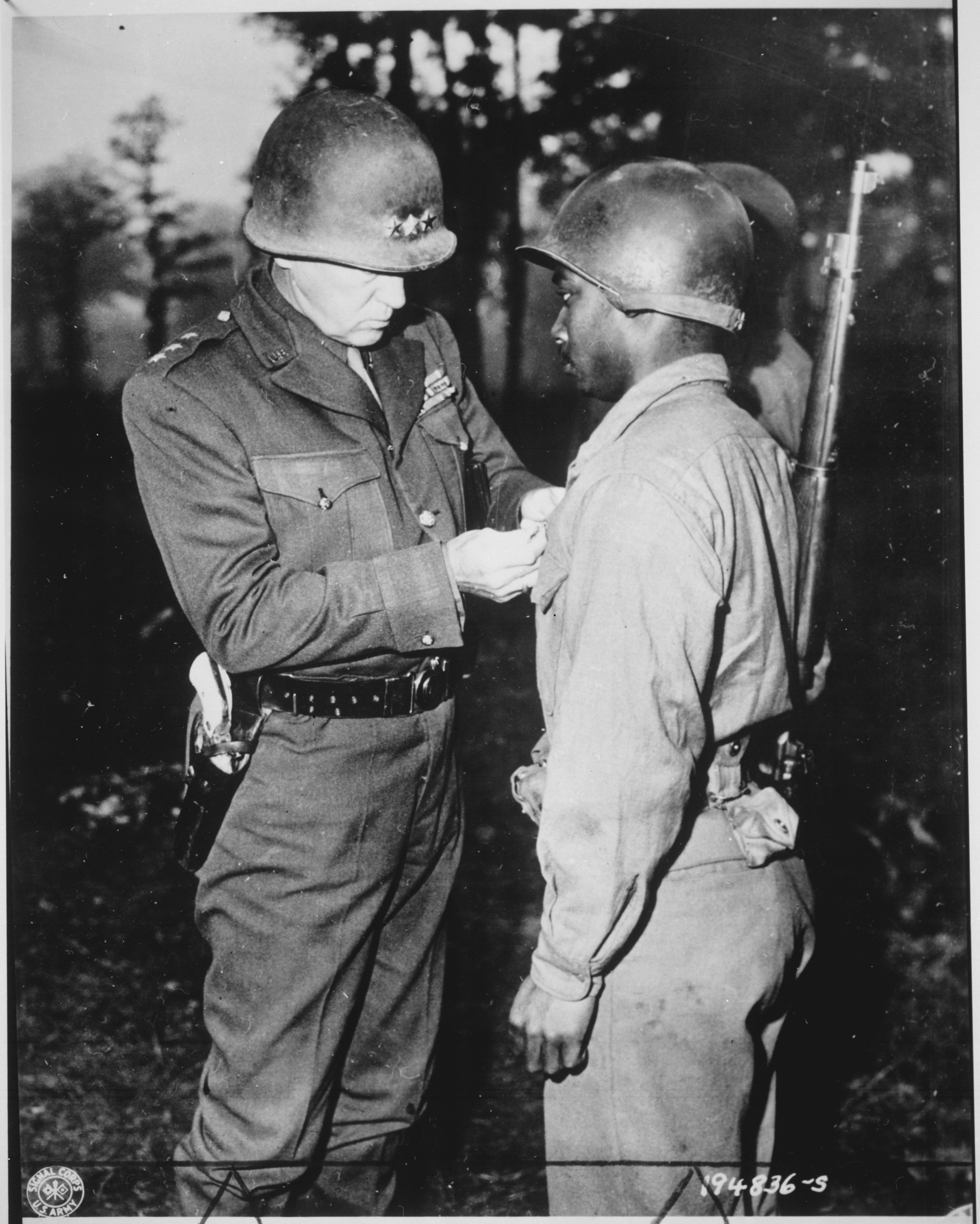
Patton pins a Silver Star Medal on Private Ernest A. Jenkins, a soldier under his command, October 1944

Patton is known to have held racist attitudes typical for those of his upbringing and family roots in the Confederate South. Privately he wrote of Black soldiers:

Individually they were good soldiers, but I expressed my belief at the time, and have never found the necessity of changing it, that a colored soldier cannot think fast enough to fight in armor.

However, publicly, Patton stated that performance was more important than race or religious affiliation:

I don't give a damn who the man is. He can be a Nigger or a Jew, but if he has the stuff and does his duty, he can have anything I've got. By God! I love him.

Patton called heavily on the Black troops under his command. Historian Hugh Cole noted Patton was the first general in the US to integrate Black and White soldiers into the same rifle companies. Additionally, the one man Patton spent the most time with during World War II was his aide and personal valet, Sergeant Major William George Meeks. Meeks was an African American career soldier, and considered a personal confidant by General Patton.

After the 761st Tank Battalion, a unit of Black soldiers, was assigned to Third Army at Patton's request in late 1944, he told them in welcoming remarks "I would never have asked for you if you weren't good."

Patton admired Russia as a political entity, but was disdainful of Russians as a people. He frequently referred to them as "Mongols" and "Asiatic" and believed that Russia was a bigger threat to Europe than Germany.

=== As viewed by Allied leaders ===
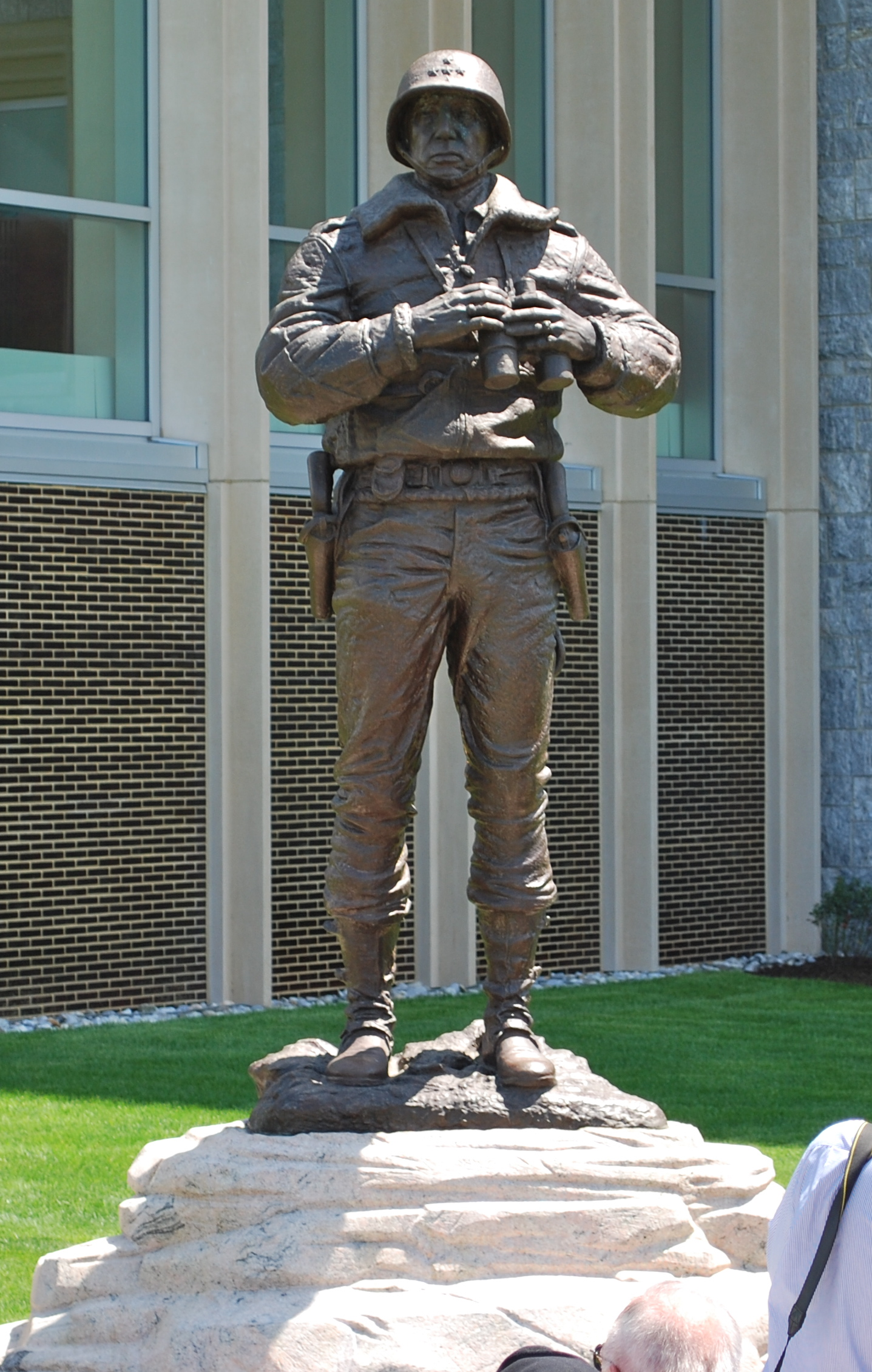
A statue of Patton at the US Military Academy at West Point

On 1 February 1945, Eisenhower wrote a memo ranking the military capabilities of his subordinate American generals in Europe. General Bradley and the Army Air Forces General Carl Spaatz shared the number one position, Walter Bedell Smith was ranked number three, and Patton number four. Eisenhower revealed his reasoning in a 1946 review of the book Patton and His Third Army: "George Patton was the most brilliant commander of an Army in the open field that our or any other service produced. But his army was part of a whole organization and his operations part of a great campaign." Eisenhower believed that other generals should be given the credit for planning the successful Allied campaigns across Europe in which Patton was merely "a brilliant executor".

Eisenhower's overall view of Patton's military value is revealed in his refusal to even consider sending him home after the slapping incidents of 1943, after which he privately remarked, "Patton is indispensable to the war effort—one of the guarantors of our victory." Assistant Secretary of War John J. McCloy told Eisenhower: "Lincoln's remark after they got after Grant comes to mind when I think of Patton—'I can't spare this man, he fights'." After Patton's death, Eisenhower wrote:

He was one of those men born to be a soldier, an ideal combat leader ... It is no exaggeration to say that Patton's name struck terror at the hearts of the enemy.

Historian Carlo D'Este insisted that Bradley disliked Patton both personally and professionally, but Bradley's biographer Jim DeFelice noted that the evidence indicated otherwise. President Franklin D. Roosevelt appeared to greatly esteem Patton and his abilities, stating "he is our greatest fighting general, and sheer joy". On the other hand, Roosevelt's successor Harry S. Truman appears to have taken an instant dislike to Patton, at one point comparing both him and Douglas MacArthur to George Armstrong Custer.

For the most part, British commanders did not hold Patton in high regard. General Alan Brooke noted in January 1943:

I had heard of him, but I must confess that his swashbuckling personality exceeded my expectation. I did not form any high opinion of him, nor had I any reason to alter this view at any later date. A dashing, courageous, wild, and unbalanced leader, good for operations requiring thrust and push, but at a loss in any operation requiring skill and judgment.

One exception was Field Marshal Bernard Montgomery who admired Patton's ability to command troops in the field, if not his strategic judgment. Other Allied commanders were even more impressed, the Free French in particular. General Henri Giraud was incredulous when he heard of Patton's dismissal by Eisenhower in late 1945 and invited him to Paris to be decorated by France's provisional government chairman Charles de Gaulle at a state banquet. At the banquet, de Gaulle gave a speech placing Patton's achievements alongside those of Napoleon. Soviet leader Joseph Stalin stated that the Red Army could neither have planned nor executed Patton's rapid armored advance across France.

=== As viewed by Axis leaders ===
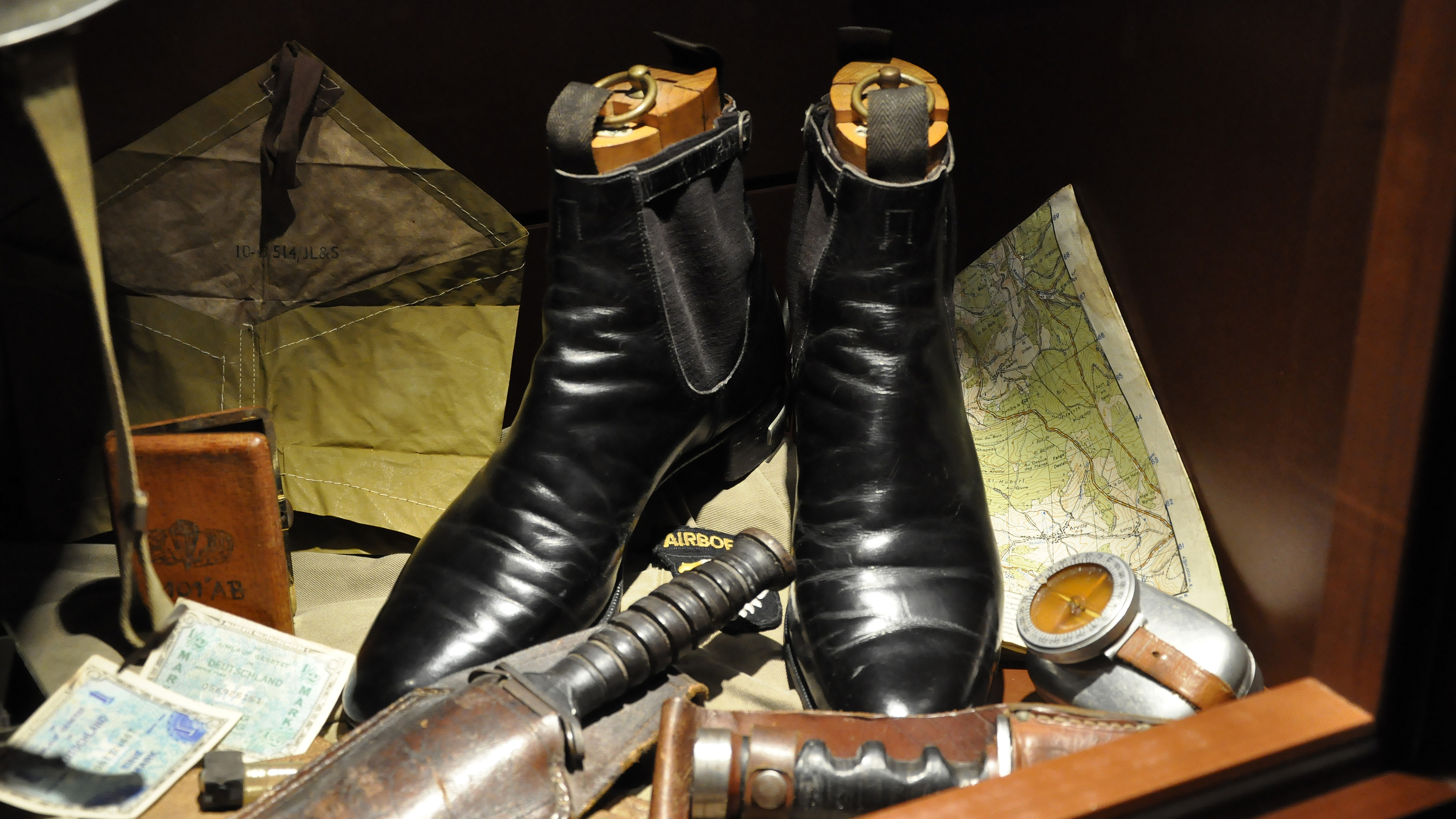
Patton's boots at a museum in Malmedy

Allied leaders expressed mixed feelings on Patton's capabilities, but the German High Command was noted to have more respect for him than for any other Allied commander after 1943. Adolf Hitler reportedly called him "that crazy cowboy general". Many German field commanders were generous in their praise of Patton's leadership following the war, (Note: Oberstleutnant Horst Freiherr von Wangenheim stated that "General Patton is the most feared general on all fronts. [His] tactics are daring and unpredictable .... He is the most modern general and the best commander of armored and infantry forces." General der Panzertruppen Hasso von Manteuffel described him as a "brilliant Panzer army commander.") and many of its highest commanders also held his abilities in high regard. Erwin Rommel credited Patton with executing "the most astonishing achievement in mobile warfare". Generaloberst Alfred Jodl stated that Patton "was the American Guderian. He was very bold and preferred large movements. He took big risks and won big successes." Generalfeldmarschall Albert Kesselring said:

Patton had developed tank warfare into an art, and understood how to handle tanks brilliantly in the field. I feel compelled, therefore, to compare him with Generalfeldmarschall Rommel, who likewise had mastered the art of tank warfare. Both of them had a kind of second sight in regard to this type of warfare.

Fritz Bayerlein said, "I do not think that General Patton would let us get away so easily," referring to the escape of the Afrika Korps after the Battle of El Alamein. Field Marshal Gerd von Rundstedt told Stars and Stripes after his capture, "He is your best."

== Major assignments ==
- Director of Instruction, Cavalry School (August 1937 – July 1938)
- Commander, 5th Cavalry (July–December 1938)
- Commander, 3rd Cavalry (December 1938 – July 1940)
- Commander, 2nd Brigade, 2nd Armored Division (16 July 1940 – November 1940)
- Commanding General, 2nd Armored Division (November 1940 to 14 January 1942)
- Commanding General, I Armored Corps (15 January – 5 August 1942)
- Commanding General, London Base Command (6 August – 7 November 1942)
- Commanding General, Western Task Force – (8 November 1942 – 8 January 1943)
- Commanding General, I Armored Corps (9 January – 3 March 1943)
- Commanding General, II Corps (4 March – 14 April 1943)
- Commanding General, I Armored Corps (15 April – 9 July 1943)
- Commanding General, 7th Army (10 July 1943 – 25 January 1944)
- Commanding General, 3rd Army (26 January 1944 – 6 October 1945)
- Commanding General, 15th Army (7 October – 21 December 1945)

== Orders, decorations and medals ==
Patton's decorations included:

1st Row	Distinguished Service Cross with one Bronze Oak Leaf Cluster	Distinguished Service Medal with two Bronze Oak Leaf Cluster	Navy Distinguished Service Medal (posthumous)	Silver Star Medal
2nd Row	Legion of Merit	Bronze Star Medal	Purple Heart	Silver Lifesaving Medal
3rd Row	Mexican Service Medal	World War I Victory Medal with five battle clasps	American Defense Service Medal	European-African-Middle Eastern Campaign Medal with one Silver campaign stars and three Bronze campaign stars
4th Row	World War II Victory Medal	Army of Occupation Medal with Germany Clasp (posthumous)	Grand Officer of the Legion of Honor (France)	Croix de Guerre 1914–1918 with bronze star (France)
5th Row	Croix de Guerre 1939–1945 with palm (France)	Grand Cordon of the Order of Ouissam Alaouite (Morocco)	Honorary Knight Commander of the Order of the British Empire (United Kingdom)	Honorary Companion Order of the Bath (United Kingdom)
6th Row	Order of Kutuzov First Class (Union of Soviet Socialist Republics)	Grand Cross of the Order of Adolphe of Nassau (Luxembourg)	Croix de Guerre 1940–1945 (Luxembourg)	Grand Cross of the Military Order of the White Lion (Czechoslovakia)
7th Row	Czechoslovak War Cross 1939 (Czechoslovakia)	Grand Officer of the Order of Leopold with palm (Belgium)	Croix de Guerre with palm (Belgium)	Medal of a liberated France (posthumous) (France)

- Patton was initially awarded a second Silver Star Medal, but was revoked and upgraded to the Distinguished Service Cross in 1920 due to conflict with the first Distinguished Service Cross awarded in 1918. Although the Silver Star Medal in Patton's photo has a Bronze Oak Leaf Cluster, Patton was never awarded the Silver Star Medal after World War I.
- When Patton applied for Purple Heart in 1932, he applied for two, one because of the Meritorious Service Citation Certificate and the other because of wound, but in the end he only got one Purple Heart because the Meritorious Service Citation Certificate was included in the Distinguished Service Medal.
- Grand Officer of the Legion of Honor is upgraded from Commander of the Legion of Honor
- The rows 1–4 are American medals unless otherwise noted.Rows 5–7 are foreign medals and noted where required.

== Dates of rank ==
Patton's dates of rank were:

Insignia	Rank	Component	Date
No pin insignia for Second Lieutenants in 1909	Second Lieutenant	Regular Army	11 June 1909
	First Lieutenant	Regular Army	23 May 1916
	Captain	Regular Army	15 May 1917
	Major	National Army	26 January 1918
	Lieutenant Colonel	National Army	30 March 1918
	Colonel	National Army	17 October 1918
	Reverted to permanent rank of Captain	Regular Army	30 June 1920
	Major	Regular Army	1 July 1920
	Lieutenant Colonel	Regular Army	1 March 1934
	Colonel	Regular Army	1 July 1938
	Brigadier General	Army of the United States	2 October 1940
	Major General	Army of the United States	4 April 1941
	Lieutenant General	Army of the United States	12 March 1943
	Brigadier General	Regular Army	16 August 1944 (Note: Official date of rank of 1 September 1943)
	Major General	Regular Army	16 August 1944 (Note: Official date of rank of 2 September 1943)
	General	Army of the United States	14 April 1945

== See also ==
- General George Patton Museum of Leadership
- List of members of the American Legion
- "Through a Glass, Darkly", a poem written by Patton

== Bibliography ==
- The Adjutant General's Office (1944). Official Army Register. Vol. 2–3. Washington, D.C.: U.S. Government Printing Office. Archived from the original on 30 September 2022 – via Google Books.
- Editorial Board (1930), American Biography: A New Cyclopedia, vol. XL, New York: American Historical Society – via Google Books
- Allen, Thomas; Dickson, Paul (2006), The Bonus Army: An American Epic, London: Walker & Company, ISBN 978-0-8027-7738-6
- Ambrose, Stephen E. (2007), Eisenhower: Soldier and President, New York City: Simon & Schuster, ISBN 978-0-945707-39-4
- Atkinson, Rick (2007), The Day of Battle: The War in Sicily and Italy, 1943–1944 (The Liberation Trilogy), New York City: Henry Holt and Company, ISBN 978-0-8050-6289-2
- Axelrod, Alan (2006), Patton: A Biography, London: Palgrave Macmillan, ISBN 978-1-4039-7139-5
- Blumenson, Martin (1972), The Patton Papers: 1885–1940, Boston, Massachusetts: Houghton Mifflin, ISBN 978-0-395-12706-3
- Blumenson, Martin (1974), The Patton Papers: 1940–1945, Boston: Houghton Mifflin, ISBN 978-0-395-18498-1
- Blumenson, M. (1996). The Patton Papers: 1940-1945. Da Capo Press. https://dn790001.ca.archive.org/0/items/the-patton-papers-1940-1945-pdf/The%20Patton%20Papers%20-%201940%20-%201945%20%28PDF%29.pdf
- Blumenson, Martin (1985), Patton: The Man Behind the Legend, New York City: William Morrow and Company, ISBN 978-0-688-13795-3
- Brighton, Terry (2009), Patton, Montgomery, Rommel: Masters of War, New York City: Crown Publishing Group, ISBN 978-0-307-46154-4
- DeFelice, Jim (2011), Omar Bradley: General at War, Washington, D.C.: Regenery History, ISBN 978-1-59698-139-3
- D'Este, Carlo (1995), Patton: A Genius for War, New York City: HarperCollins, ISBN 978-0-06-016455-3
- D'Este, Carlo (2002), Eisenhower: A Soldier's Life, New York City: Henry Holt and Company, ISBN 978-0-8050-5687-7
- Edey, Maitland A. (1968), Time Capsule 1943, London: Littlehampton Book Services, ISBN 978-0-7054-0270-5
- Empric, Bruce E. (2024), Uncommon Allies: U.S. Army Recipients of Soviet Military Decorations in World War II, Teufelsberg Press, ISBN 979-8-3444-6807-5
- English, John (2009). Patton's Peers: The Forgotten Allied Field Army Commanders of the Western Front, 1944−1945. Stackpole Books. ISBN 978-0-8117-0501-1.
- Essame, H. (1974), Patton: A Study in Command, New York City: Scribner & Sons, ISBN 978-0-684-13671-4
- Evans, Colin (2001), Great feuds in history: ten of the liveliest disputes ever, New York City: John Wiley and Sons, ISBN 978-0-471-38038-2
- Farago, Ladislas (2005) [1964], Patton: Ordeal and Triumph, New York City: Ivan Sergeyevich Obolensky, ISBN 978-1-59416-011-0
- Farago, Ladislas (1981), The Last Days of Patton, Yardley, Pennsylvania: Westholme Publishing LLC, ISBN 978-1-59416-531-3
- Fuller, Robert P. (2004), Last shots for Patton's Third Army, Portland, Maine: NETR Press, ISBN 978-0-9740519-0-1
- Gooderson, Ian (1998), Air Power at the Battlefront: Allied Close Air Support in Europe 1943–45, Portland, Oregon: Routledge, ISBN 978-0-7146-4211-6
- Hirshson, Stanley (2003), General Patton: A Soldier's Life, New York City: Harper Perennial, ISBN 978-0-06-000983-0
- Hunt, David (1990) [1966], A Don at War (revised ed.), Great Britain: Frank Cass, ISBN 978-0-7146-3383-1
- Hymel, Kevin M.; Patton's War: An American General's Combat Leadership, Volume I: November 1942–July 1944 (University of Missouri Press, 2021) online review
- Jarymowycz, Roman J. (2001), Tank tactics: from Normandy to Lorraine, Boulder, Colorado: Lynne Rienner Publishers, ISBN 978-1-55587-950-1
- Jowett, Philip; de Quesada, Alejandro (2006), The Mexican Revolution 1910–1920, London: Osprey Publishing, p. 25, ISBN 978-1-84176-989-9
- Le Tissier, Tony (2007), Patton's Pawns: The 94th US Infantry Division at the Siegfried Line, Tuscaloosa, Alabama: University of Alabama Press, ISBN 978-0-8173-1557-3
- Lovelace, Alexander G. (2019), ""Slap Heard around the World": George Patton and Shell Shock" (PDF), Parameters: The US Army War College Quarterly, vol. 49, pp. 71–91, archived (PDF) from the original on 15 February 2020
- Lovelace, Alexander G. (2014), "The Image of a General: The Wartime Relationship between General George S. Patton Jr. and the American Media", Journalism History, vol. 40, pp. 108–120
- McNeese, Tim (2003), Great Battles through the Ages: Battle of the Bulge, New York City: Chelsea House Publications, ISBN 978-0-7910-7435-0
- Nester, William (2025), General George S. Patton and the Art of Leadership: One of America's Greatest Ever Generals, Barnsley, South Yorkshire, England: Pen & Sword Books, ISBN 978-1-03612-090-0 – via Google Books
- Patton, George S. (1995) [1947], War as I Knew It, Boston, Massachusetts: Houghton Mifflin Co., ISBN 978-1-4193-2492-5
- Regan, Geoffrey (1992), Military Anecdotes, Enfield, Middlesex: Guinness Publishing, ISBN 978-0-85112-519-0
- Rice, Earl (2004), George S. Patton, Sagebrush Education Resources, ISBN 978-1-4176-2100-2
- Rickard, John Nelson (2004), Patton at Bay: The Lorraine Campaign, September to December 1944, Dulles, Virginia: Brassey's Inc., ISBN 978-1-57488-782-2
- Showalter, Dennis E. (2006), Patton And Rommel: Men of War in the Twentieth Century (2006 ed.), New York City: Berkley Books, ISBN 978-0-425-20663-8
- Steele, Brett D. (2005), Military Reengineering Between the World Wars, Chicago: Rand Publishing, ISBN 978-0-8330-3721-3
- Trigg, Jonathan (2020). To VE-Day through German Eyes: The Final Defeat of Nazi Germany. Stroud UK: Amberley. ISBN 978-1-4456-9944-8.
- von Mellenthin, Frederich W. (2006), Panzer Battles: A Study of the Employment of Armor in the Second World War, Old Saybrook, Connecticut: Konecky & Konecky, ISBN 978-1-56852-578-5
- Wallace, Brenton G. (2000) [1946], Patton & His Third Army, Mechanicsburg, Pa: Stackpole Books, ISBN 978-0-8117-2896-6
- Zaloga, Steven (2008), Armored Thunderbolt: The U.S. Army Sherman in World War II, Mechanicsburg, Pennsylvania: Stackpole Books, ISBN 978-0-8117-0424-3
- Zaloga, Steven (2010), George S. Patton: Leadership, Strategy, Conflict, Oxford, United Kingdom: Osprey Publishing, ISBN 978-1-84603-459-6, archived from the original on 21 December 2019
- Zabecki, David T.; Mastriano, Douglas V., eds. (2020). Pershing's Lieutenants: American Military Leadership in World War I. Osprey Publishing. ISBN 978-1-4728-3863-6.

Awards and achievements
Preceded by Sir Thomas Beecham; Walter F. George; Matthew Ridgway	Cover of Time magazine 12 April 1943; 26 July 1943; 9 April 1945	Succeeded by Manuel Ávila Camacho; Ingrid Bergman; Simon Bolivar Buckner Jr.
Military offices
Preceded by Charles L. Scott	Commanding General 2nd Armored Division; 1941–1942	Succeeded by Willis D. Crittenberger
Preceded by Charles L. Scott	Commanding General I Armored Corps; 1942–1943	Succeeded by Geoffrey Keyes
Preceded by Lloyd Fredendall	Commanding General II Corps; March–April 1943	Succeeded by Omar Bradley
New command	Commanding General Seventh Army; 1943–1944	Succeeded by Mark W. Clark
Preceded by Courtney Hodges	Commanding General Third Army; 1944–1945	Succeeded by Lucian Truscott
Preceded by Leonard T. Gerow	Commanding General Fifteenth Army; October–December 1945	Succeeded by Hobart R. Gay
