= Twelfth United States Army Group =

- Shoulder sleeve insignia
- Active: 1944–45
- Country: United States
- Branch: United States Army
- Type: Army group
- Role: Army Group Headquarters
- Size: 1.3 million men
- Part of: Allied Expeditionary Force
- Engagements: World War II

Commanders
- Notable commanders: Omar Bradley

The Twelfth United States Army Group was the largest and most powerful United States Army formation ever to take to the field, commanding four field armies at its peak in 1945: First United States Army, Third United States Army, Ninth United States Army, and Fifteenth United States Army. The order of battle across the four armies comprised 12 corps, containing a total of 48 divisions. Formed eight days after the Normandy landings, it initially controlled the First and the Third US Armies. Through various configurations in 1944 and 1945, the Twelfth US Army Group controlled the majority of American forces on the Western Front. It was commanded by General Omar Bradley with its headquarters established in London on 14 July 1944.

During the first week of the Normandy landings and the Battle of Normandy, Bradley's First US Army formed the right wing of the Allied lines. They were joined during July by the Third US Army, under the command of General George S. Patton, to form the Twelfth Army Group. Twelfth Army Group became operational in France on 1 August 1944. With General Omar Bradley assuming command of the Twelfth Army Group, Lieutenant General Courtney Hodges assumed command of the First Army. In addition, the USAAF's Ninth Air Force (not included in the 1.3 million soldiers figure) was attached to support the field armies of the Twelfth Army Group.

Until 1 September 1944, when General Dwight D. Eisenhower assumed overall command of the Allied land forces in Northwest Europe, the US forces in Normandy were included with the British Second Army and the First Canadian Army in the British headquarters formation 21st Army Group, commanded by General Bernard Montgomery.

After the breakout from the beach-head at Normandy, the Twelfth Army Group formed the center of the Allied forces on the Western Front. To the north was the British 21st Army Group (the First Canadian and British Second) and, to the south, advancing from their landing on the Mediterranean coast, was the Sixth United States Army Group (Seventh United States Army and French First Army).

As the Twelfth advanced through Germany in 1945, it grew to control four United States field armies: the First, the Third, the Ninth and the Fifteenth. By V-E Day, the Twelfth Army Group was a force that numbered over 1.3 million men.

Twelfth Army Group was inactivated on 12 July 1945 upon Bradley's departure to become Director of the Veterans Administration. Its subordinate elements then became directly subordinate to United States Army Europe.

== Staff ==
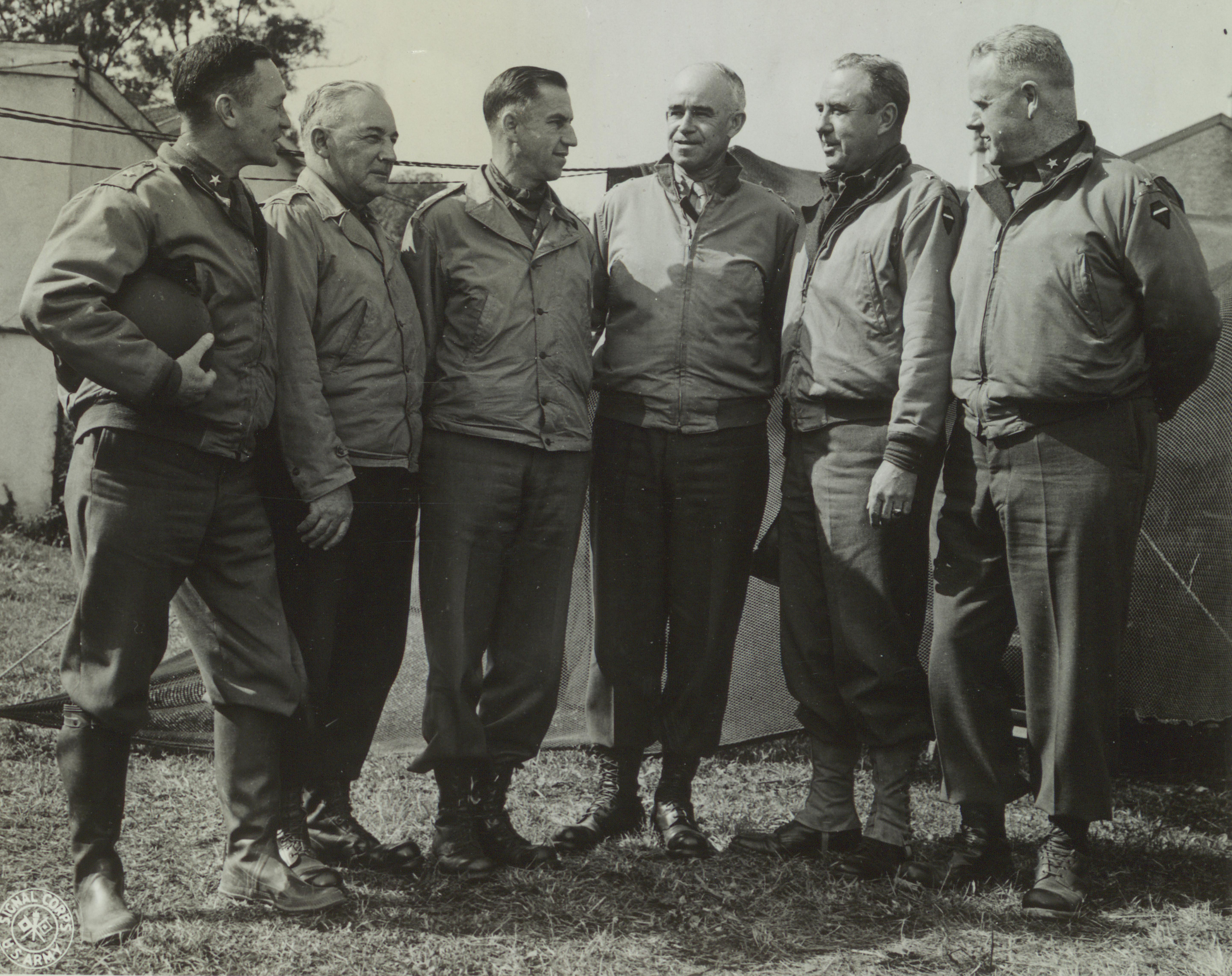
Omar Bradley and senior staff circa September 1944 - (L-to-R); Sibert, Kibler, Allen, Bradley, Moses, O'Hare

Headquarters Twelfth United States Army Group Commanding General and Chiefs of Staff Sections
Position	1 August 1944	8 May 1945
Commanding General	Lieutenant General Omar N. Bradley	General Omar N. Bradley
Chief of Staff	Major General Leven C. Allen	Major General Leven C. Allen
Deputy Chief of Staff	Brigadier General Robert W. Hasbrouck	Brigadier General Henry B. Lewis
Secretary, General Staff	Lieutenant Colonel Eldon L. Bailey	Colonel Eldon L. Bailey
G-1 (Personnel)	Colonel Joseph J. O'Hare	Brigadier General Joseph O'Hare
G-2 (Intelligence)	Brigadier General Edwin L. Sibert	Brigadier General Edwin L. Sibert
G-3 (Operations and training)	Brigadier General A. Franklin Kibler	Brigadier General A. Franklin Kibler
G-4 (Logistics)	Brigadier General Raymond G. Moses	Brigadier General Raymond G. Moses
G-5 (Civil-military operations)	Colonel Cornelius E. Ryan	Brigadier General Cornelius E. Ryan
Adjutant General	Brigadier General Henry B. Lewis	Colonel Charles R. Landon
Artillery Officer	Brigadier General John H. Hinds	Colonel Thomas B. Hedekin
Armored	Colonel Edwin K. Wright	Colonel Edwin K. Wright
Chaplain		Lieutenant Colonel Morgan J. O'Brien
Chemical	Colonel John C. MacArthur	Colonel Patrick F. Powers
Engineer	Colonel Patrick H. Timothy	Brigadier General Patrick H. Timothy
Finance	Lieutenant Colonel Paul G. Hommeyer	Major Eugene R. Melton
Headquarters Commandant	Colonel Harry J. Karakas	Colonel Harry J. Karakas
Inspector General	Lieutenant Colonel Walter B. Cramer	Colonel Frank G. Ringland
Judge Advocate	Colonel Claude B. Mickelwait	Colonel Claude B. Mickelwait
Ordnance	Colonel Harold A. Nisley	Brigadier General Harold A. Nisley
P & PW	Colonel Clifford R. Powell	Colonel Francis J. Fitzgerald
Provost Marshal	Colonel Claud E. Stadtman	Colonel Claud E. Stadtman
Quartermaster	Colonel James W. Younger	Brigadier General James W. Younger
Signal	Colonel Garland C. Black	Brigadier General Garland C. Black
Special Service	Lieutenant Colonel Francis E. Conder	Colonel Thomas M. Crawford
Surgeon	Colonel Alvin L. Gorby	Colonel Alvin L. Gorby
Transportation	Colonel Calvin L. Whittle	Colonel Calvin L. Whittle
Commanding General, Special Troops	Brigadier General Charles R. Doran	Brigadier General Charles R. Doran

== Order of battle – 8 May 1945 ==
- 12th Army Group – General Omar N. Bradley
  - First Army – General Courtney H. Hodges
    - 78th Infantry Division – Major General Edwin P. Parker Jr.
    - VII Corps – Lieutenant General J. Lawton Collins
      - 3rd Armored Division – Brigadier General Doyle O. Hickey
      - 9th Infantry Division – Major General Louis A. Craig
      - 69th Infantry Division – Major General Emil F. Reinhardt
      - 104th Infantry Division – Major General Terry de la Mesa Allen Sr.
    - VIII Corps – Major General Troy H. Middleton
      - 6th Armored Division – Major General Robert W. Grow
      - 76th Infantry Division – Major General William R. Schmidt
      - 87th Infantry Division – Major General Frank L. Culin Jr.
      - 89th Infantry Division – Major General Thomas D. Finley
  - Third Army – General George S. Patton Jr.
    - 4th Infantry Division – Major General Harold W. Blakeley
    - 70th Infantry Division – Major General Allison J. Barnett
    - III Corps – Major General James Van Fleet
      - 14th Armored Division – Major General Albert C. Smith
      - 99th Infantry Division – Major General Walter E. Lauer
    - V Corps – Major General Clarence R. Huebner
      - 9th Armored Division – Major General John W. Leonard
      - 16th Armored Division – Brigadier General John L. Pierce
      - 1st Infantry Division – Major General Clift Andrus
      - 2nd Infantry Division – Major General Walter M. Robertson
      - 97th Infantry Division – Brigadier General Milton B. Halsey
    - XII Corps – Major General Stafford LeRoy Irwin
      - 4th Armored Division – Major General William M. Hoge
      - 11th Armored Division – Major General Holmes E. Dager
      - 5th Infantry Division – Major General Albert E. Brown
      - 26th Infantry Division – Major General Willard S. Paul
      - 90th Infantry Division – Major General Herbert L. Earnest
    - XX Corps – Major General Walton H. Walker
      - 13th Armored Division – Major General John Millikin
      - 65th Infantry Division – Major General Stanley E. Reinhart
      - 71st Infantry Division – Major General Willard G. Wyman
      - 80th Infantry Division – Major General Horace L. McBride
  - Ninth Army – Lieutenant General William H. Simpson
    - XIII Corps – Major General Alvan C. Gillem, Jr.
      - 35th Infantry Division – Major General Paul W. Baade
      - 84th Infantry Division – Major General Alexander R. Bolling
      - 102nd Infantry Division – Major General Frank A. Keating
    - XVI Corps – Major General John B. Anderson
      - 29th Infantry Division – Major General Charles H. Gerhardt
      - 75th Infantry Division – Major General Ray E. Porter
      - 79th Infantry Division – Major General Ira T. Wyche
      - 95th Infantry Division – Major General Harry L. Twaddle
    - XIX Corps – Major General Raymond S. McLain
      - 2nd Armored Division – Major General Isaac D. White
      - 8th Armored Division – Major General John M. Devine
      - 30th Infantry Division – Major General Leland S. Hobbs
      - 83rd Infantry Division – Major General Robert C. Macon
  - Fifteenth Army – Lieutenant General Leonard T. Gerow
    - 66th Infantry Division – Major General Herman F. Kramer
    - 106th Infantry Division – Major General Donald A. Stroh
    - XXII Corps – Major General Ernest N. Harmon
      - 17th Airborne Division – Major General William M. Miley
      - 94th Infantry Division – Major General Harry J. Malony
    - XXIII Corps – Major General Hugh J. Gaffey
      - 28th Infantry Division – Major General Norman D. Cota
  - XVIII Airborne Corps (attached to 21st Army Group) – Major General Matthew B. Ridgway
    - 5th Armored Division – Major General Lunsford E. Oliver
    - 7th Armored Division – Major General Robert W. Hasbrouck
    - 8th Infantry Division – Major General Bryant E. Moore
    - 82nd Airborne Division – Major General James M. Gavin

Source: Bradley, Omar, A Soldier's Story, New York: Henry Holt and Company (1950), pp. 557–561
