= Horace Woodring =

American soldier (1926–2003)

Horace Lynn Woodring
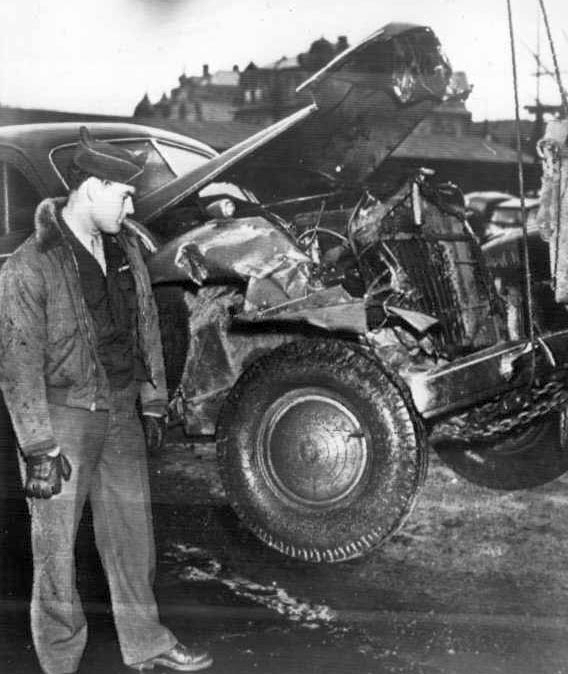
- PFC Horace Woodring (left) next to Patton's car after the crash (1945)
- Born: September 30, 1926; Morganfield, Kentucky, US
- Died: November 2, 2003 (aged 77); Detroit, Michigan, US
- Military career
- Branch: Army
- Service years: 1941–1946
- Rank: Private First Class
- Unit: Fifteenth United States Army
- Known for: Driver of General Patton's Cadillac limousine
- Conflicts: World War II; Battle of the Bulge
- Awards: American Campaign Medal, European-African-Middle Eastern Campaign Medal, World War II Victory Medal, Combat Infantryman Badge

Horace Lynn Woodring (September 30, 1926 – November 2, 2003) was an American World War II veteran who got into a car crash near Mannheim, Germany, which fatally wounded United States General, George S. Patton.

== Early life ==
Horace was born in Morganfield, Kentucky, in 1926, to Ulis Marion Woodring and Hattie Ploexina Lynn. Horace worked as a dairy farmer and car driver and enlisted in the Army when he was 15 years old, after he lied about being 18.

== Military career ==
Horace became a Private First Class in 1945 and fought with the Fifteenth United States Army at the Battle of the Bulge. However, he developed frostbite and was declared unfit for infantry duties. He was transferred to transportation and became a driver for General George S. Patton, whom he agreed to work for after the war's conclusion.

=== Patton's death ===
On December 9, 1945, PFC Woodring was driving a 1938 Cadillac limousine near Mannheim, Germany, with Patton and General Hobart R. Gay to hunt pheasant. While they were driving, a truck turned in front of the car. In the collision, Patton was thrown from the back seat into a steel partition between the driver and passenger compartments, breaking his neck. Although everyone was looking for someone to blame for the accident, General Patton would not allow it to be blamed on Woodring. General Patton died of his injuries on 21 December 1945.

== Post-war ==
Following his discharge in 1946, Horace went back to Kentucky and married Margaret Jerelene Adamson, with whom he had one son, John Patton Woodring. The family moved to Michigan, and Horace sold cars until his death of heart failure in November 2003.
