= Fay B. Prickett =

U.S. Army major general

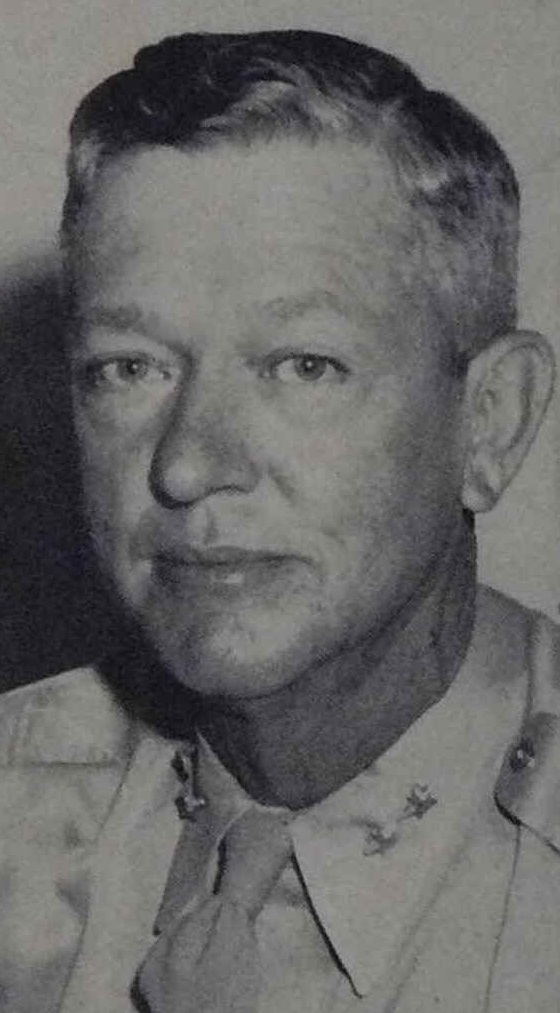
- From 1944's 75th Infantry Division: Graduation Album
- Born: Fay Brink Prickett; April 29, 1893; Hutchinson, Kansas, United States
- Died: December 18, 1982 (aged 89); Washington, D.C., United States
- Burial place: Arlington National Cemetery, Virginia, United States
- Spouse: Margaret Murray McGregor (m. 1917-1982, his death)
- Children: 3
- Military career
- Allegiance: United States
- Branch: United States Army
- Service years: 1908−1912; 1916−1953
- Rank: Major General
- Service number: 0-4458
- Units: Field Artillery Branch; Cavalry Branch
- Commands: Field Artillery Detachment, United States Military Academy; 4th Infantry Division Artillery; 75th Infantry Division; 10th Armored Division; 4th Armored Division; 1st Constabulary Brigade; Pennsylvania Military District, Second U.S. Army
- Conflicts: Pancho Villa Expedition; World War I World War II
- Awards: Legion of Merit with Oak leaf cluster Bronze Star; Legion of Honor (France); Croix de Guerre with palm (France)

Fay Brink Prickett (April 29, 1893 - December 18, 1982) was a career officer in the United States Army. A veteran of the Pancho Villa Expedition, World War I, and World War II, he was most notable for his Second World War command of the 75th Infantry Division, and his post-war command of the 10th Armored Division, 4th Armored Division, and 1st Constabulary Brigade. He attained the rank of major general, and his awards included the Legion of Merit with Oak leaf cluster and Bronze Star Medal.

== Early life ==
Prickett was born in Hutchinson, Kansas on April 29, 1893, the son of Darius Prickett, a carpenter, and Rosa Lee (née Dickerson) Prickett. He was raised and educated in Hutchinson, and attended Hutchinson High School. In high school, Prickett was known for his athletic prowess, and was a member of the basketball, football, and track and field teams. In 1911, he was elected president of the junior class.

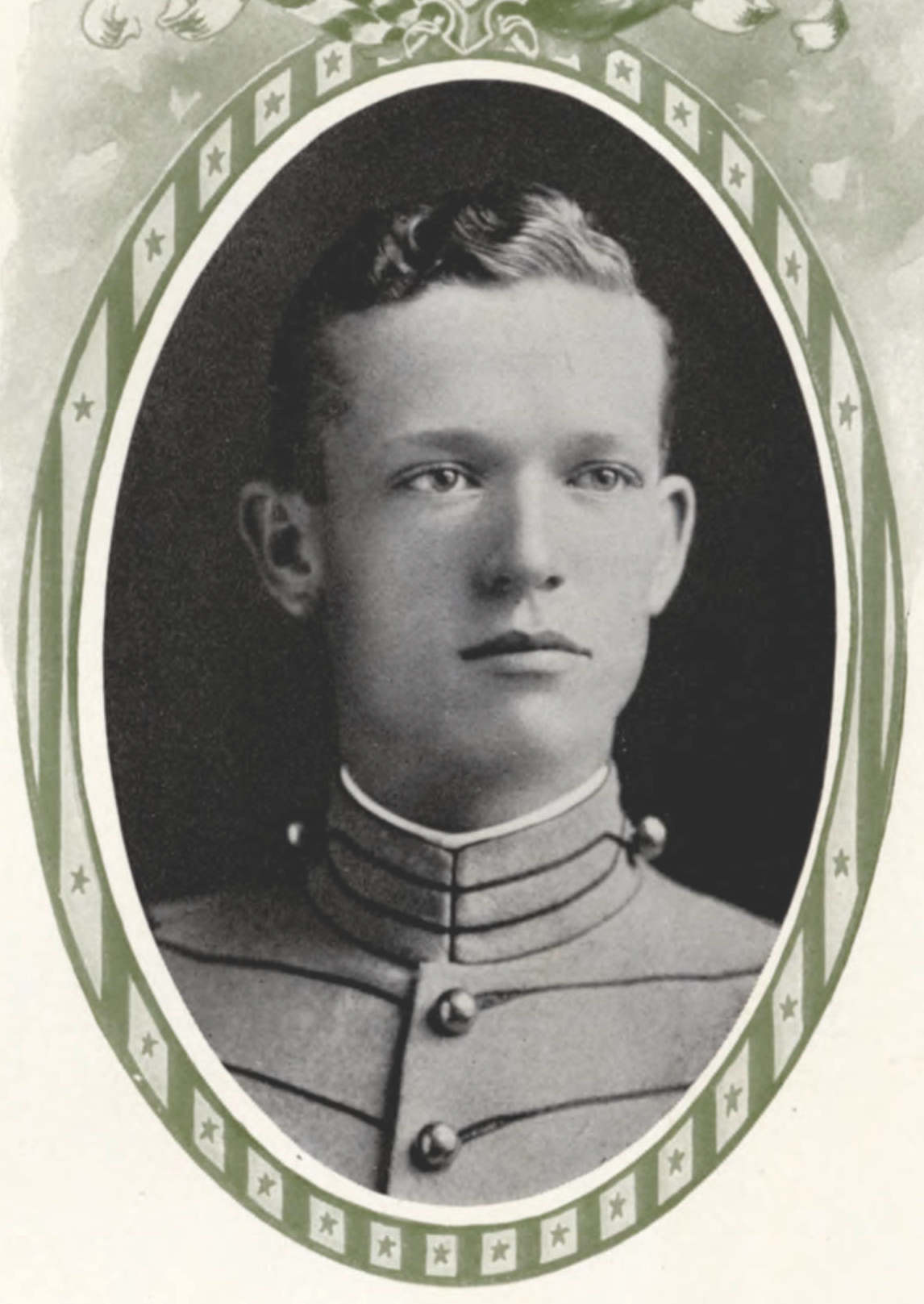
At West Point in 1916

At age 14, Prickett joined the Kansas Army National Guard as the bugler for Company E, 2nd Kansas Infantry Regiment. He served for four years and during training exercises was frequently called upon to serve as the regimental commander's mounted trumpeter. In April 1912, Prickett was appointed to the United States Military Academy at West Point by Congressman George A. Neeley. He then withdrew from high school so he could study with private tutors prior to taking the West Point entrance exam.

Prickett passed the May 1912 entrance exam and he began attending the military academy in the fall of 1912. He graduated in June 1916 ranked 57th of 125. Prickett received his commission as a second lieutenant and was assigned to the 10th Cavalry Regiment.

== Start of career ==
After joining the 10th Cavalry at Fort Huachuca, Arizona, Prickett took part in the Pancho Villa Expedition on the U.S.-Mexico border. In July 1916, he received promotion to first lieutenant. At the start of World War I, he transferred to the Field Artillery Branch. He was promoted to captain in May 1917 and completed the Field Artillery Officer Basic Course at Fort Sill, Oklahoma in December 1917.

In February 1918, Prickett was transferred to the 16th Field Artillery Regiment, which arrived in France in May 1918. Prickett was promoted to temporary major in July, and was assigned to command a battalion. He led his unit during the Battle of Château-Thierry, Battle of Saint-Mihiel, and Meuse-Argonne offensive, and remained in command until the end of the war. After the Armistice of November 11, 1918 ended the war, Prickett remained in Germany as part of the Army of Occupation.

== Continued career ==
After the war, Prickett reverted to his permanent rank of captain and continued to serve in staff and command positions of increasing responsibility. He was a 1920 graduate of the Field Artillery Battery Officers Course, and he completed the Field Artillery Officers Advanced Course in 1923. In 1924, he was assigned as an instructor at Princeton University. The Army prioritized polo playing in the 1920s and 1920s, believing that the game enabled officers to learn to make quick decisions under stress. Prickett played on Army teams, and also coached Princeton's team in the mid-1920s.

In 1929, he completed the course at the United States Army Command and General Staff College. In 1932, Prickett graduated from the United States Army War College. In 1937, he was appointed to command West Point's Field Artillery Detachment.

== World War II ==
At the start of World War II, Prickett was promoted to brigadier general as commander of the 4th Infantry Division Artillery. He was subsequently promoted to major general as commander of the 75th Infantry Division, which he trained in the United States and led to France. Prickett led the division during combat in Europe, including the Battle of the Bulge. In January 1945, he was assigned as deputy commander of the XXI Corps.

== Post-World War II ==
After the war, Prickett remained in Europe, where he led in succession the 10th Armored Division, 4th Armored Division, and 1st Constabulary Brigade. As part of his occupation duties, Prickett led the military tribunal at Dachau which tried Germans who were accused of committing crimes at the Mauthausen concentration camp. After his return to the United States, Prickett commanded the Second U.S. Army's Pennsylvania Military District. His terminal assignment was deputy inspector general of the U.S. Army, which he held until retiring in April 1953.

== Retirement and death ==
In retirement, Prickett resided in Alexandria, Virginia. In addition to teaching military history at the University of Maryland, College Park, Prickett golfed almost daily at Alexandria's Army Navy Country Club, often playing alongside longtime friend Jacob L. Devers.

Prickett died at Walter Reed Army Medical Center on December 18, 1982. He was buried at Arlington National Cemetery.

== Family ==
In March 1917, Prickett married Margaret Murray McGregor (1898-2003) of Denver, Colorado. They were the parents of three daughters: Margaret (Peggy); Mary (Polly); and Virginia (Ginger).

Peggy was the wife of Major General Frank Dickson Miller. Polly was the wife of Brigadier General Francis Joseph Roberts. Ginger was the wife of Colonel Lee E. Cage Sr.

== Awards ==
Prickett's military awards included the Legion of Merit with Oak leaf cluster and the Bronze Star Medal. In addition, his World War II service was recognized with award of the French Legion of Honor and Croix de Guerre with palm.

== Dates of promotion ==
Prickett's effective dates of promotion were:

- Second lieutenant, June 14, 1912
- First lieutenant, July 1, 1916
- Captain, May 19, 1917
- Major (temporary), July 3, 1918
- Captain, February 3, 1920
- Major (temporary), May 9, 1921
- Captain, November 4, 1922
- Major, December 28, 1926
- Lieutenant colonel, September 1, 1937
- Colonel (temporary), June 26, 1941
- Brigadier general (temporary), March 12, 1942
- Major general (temporary), January 14, 1944
- Brigadier general (temporary), July 1, 1946
- Major general (retired), April 30, 1953

Military offices
Preceded by Willard S. Paul	Commanding General 75th Infantry Division; 1943−1945	Succeeded by Ray E. Porter
