= A. Arnim White =

US Army general (1889–1981)

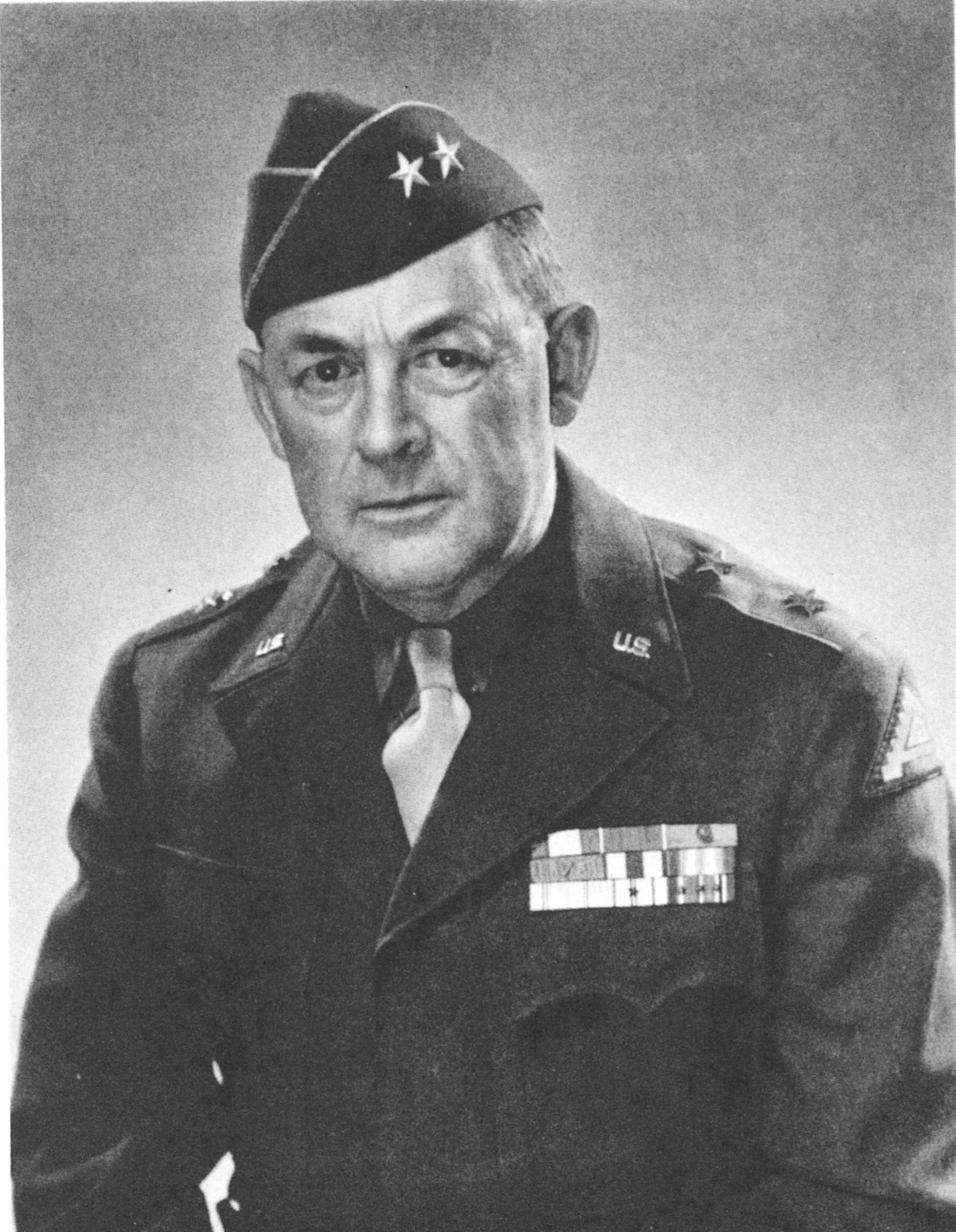
- A. Arnim White, wearing the two stars of a major general, pictured here in 1945
- Born: Arthur Arnim White; 21 October 1889; Coatsburg, Illinois, United States
- Died: 21 October 1981 (aged 92); Fayetteville, North Carolina, United States
- Burial place: Arlington National Cemetery, Virginia, United States
- Military career
- Allegiance: United States
- Branch: United States Army
- Service years: 1907–1910; 1915–1949
- Rank: Major General
- Nickname: "Doc"
- Service number: 0-3900
- Units: Infantry Branch; Field Artillery Branch
- Commands: 9th Infantry Division; V Corps Artillery; 71st Infantry Division; 75th Infantry Division; 37th Field Artillery Regiment; 3rd Field Artillery Training Regiment
- Conflicts: Pancho Villa Expedition; World War I; World War II
- Awards: Army Distinguished Service Medal (2); Legion of Merit (2); Commendation Ribbon (2); Officer of the Legion of Honor (France); Croix de Guerre with Palm (France)

Major General Arthur Arnim White (21 October 1889 – 21 October 1981) was a United States Army officer. A West Point classmate of Dwight D. Eisenhower, White served during World War II, where he was chief of staff of both XIV Corps during the Guadalcanal campaign and the U.S. Seventh Army during the Southern France campaign and in Operation Northwind.

== Early life and education ==
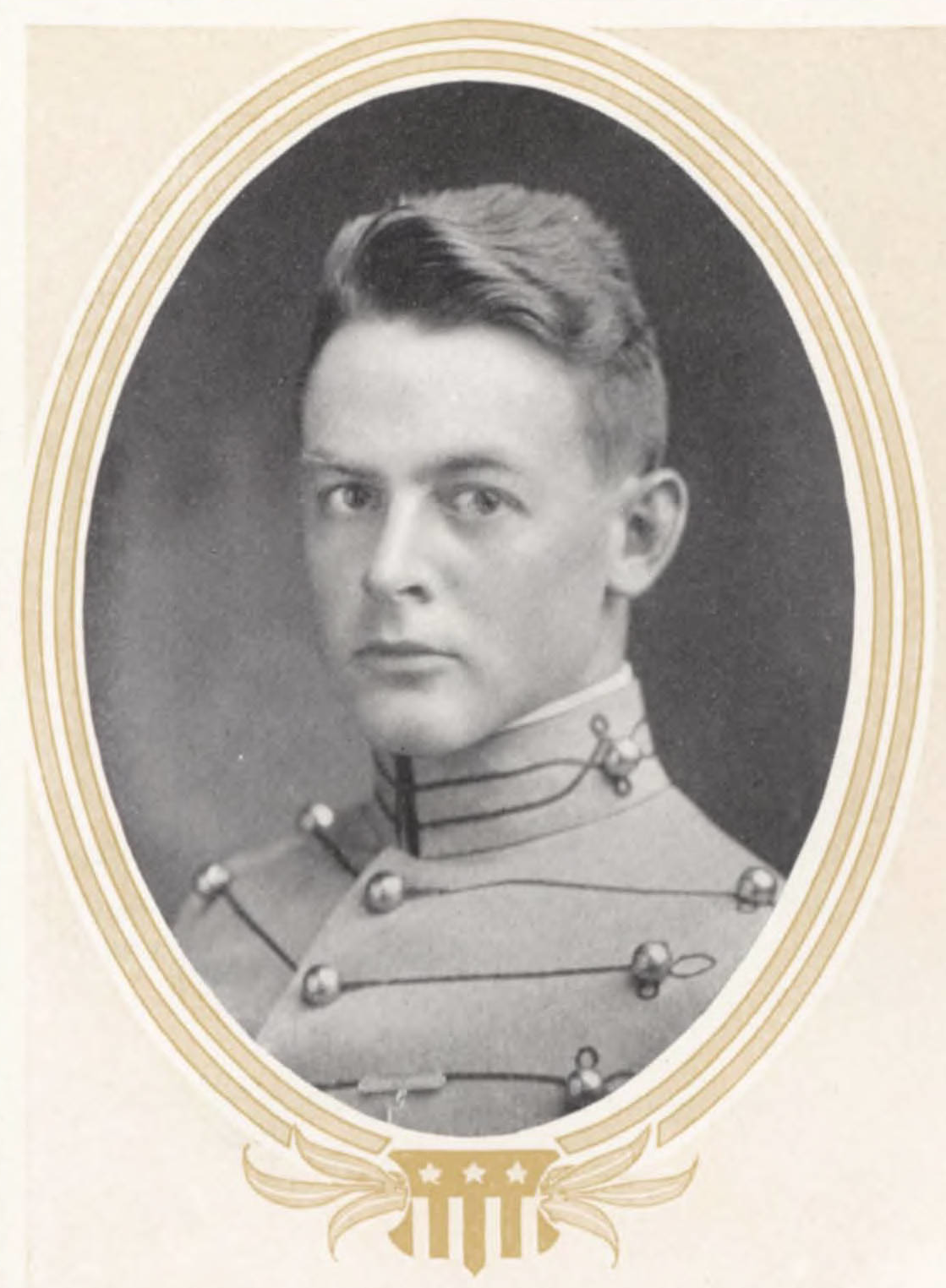
At West Point in 1915

White, who was always known by his middle name Arnim, or his nickname "Doc", was born in Coatsburg, Illinois on 21 October 1889, the second of the four sons of James White and his wife Lillie (née Poling). He attended high school in Springfield, Illinois, and became a reporter for the local newspaper. He also served in the 1st Illinois Cavalry between 1907 and 1910.

In June 1911, White entered the United States Military Academy (USMA) at West Point, New York, as part of the class of 1915, also known as the class the stars fell on due to the fact that 59 of its members later rose to become general officers, the most of any class in the school's history. His classmates included Dwight D. Eisenhower and Omar Bradley, both of whom later became five-star generals. White himself graduated 158th in the class of 164.

== World War I ==
Commissioned as a second lieutenant in the 26th Infantry on 12 June 1915, White's first posting was to Brownsville, Texas, where he served with the Pancho Villa Expedition. He became a first lieutenant in the newly-formed 36th Infantry on 1 July 1916. He transferred to the 17th Cavalry Regiment while he was stationed on the Mexican border on 13 January 1917.

The American entry into World War I followed soon afterwards, in April 1917, by which time artillery was in greater demand than cavalry. As a result, White was transferred to the field artillery on 13 July 1917, with a promotion to captain backdated to 15 May 1917. He was assigned to the 11th Field Artillery Regiment on the Mexican border at Douglas, Arizona, except for a brief posting to the School of Fire at Fort Sill, Oklahoma, from 11 August to 1 October 1917. He married Therese Sterling Bain, a Vassar College graduate from Canajoharie, New York, in Douglas on 15 September 1917. They had a son, Arthur Bain White, who was born in 1921.

The 11th Field Artillery Regiment moved to Camp Doniphan, Oklahoma, on 24 April 1918, where he was promoted to major on 3 July 1918. He commanded the 3rd Field Artillery Training Regiment at Camp Zachary Taylor, Kentucky, from 9 July to 4 August 1918, and was with the 37th Field Artillery Regiment at Camp Lewis, Washington, from 9 August 1918 to 20 February 1919, as its commander from 15 December 1918, shortly after the Armistice with Germany on November 11, which brought a cessation to hostilities. On 5 March 1919, he was transferred to the 83rd Field Artillery Regiment at Camp Knox, Kentucky, where he remained until 9 September 1919.

== Between the wars ==
White served overseas with the American forces in France from 9 September 1919 to 14 November 1919, when he returned to the U.S. Army Field Artillery School (formerly the School of Fire) at Fort Sill for a battery commander's course. Like many other officers, he was reduced in rank to captain on 13 February 1920, but was promoted to major again on 10 September 1920. He served with the 82nd Field Artillery Regiment at Fort Bliss, Texas, from December 1920 to May 1921, then with the 11th Field Artillery at Schofield Barracks in the Territory of Hawaii from October 1921 to July 1924. He was reduced to captain again on 4 November 1922, then posted to Fort Bragg, North Carolina, where he served with the 5th Field Artillery from November 1924 until August 1926. He was promoted to major for the third and final time on 16 September 1925.

From August 1926 to June 1927, White completed the Advanced Course at the Field Artillery School at Fort Sill. He then attended the U.S. Army Command and General Staff College at Fort Leavenworth, Kansas from September 1926 to June 1928. From 9 July 1928 to 27 June 1934 he was Assistant Professor of Military Science and Tactics at Harvard University. He then returned to the Field Artillery School at Fort Sill, this time as an instructor in Tactics and Communications from 1 August 1934 to 22 June 1938. After nearly 20 years as a major, he was promoted to lieutenant colonel on 11 January 1937. This was followed by a tour as executive officer of the 1st Field Artillery there from 3 July 1938 to 30 June 1939, and with the historical section at the Army War College from 15 August 1939 to 12 November 1940.

== World War II ==
On 18 November 1940, White became Assistant Chief of Staff (G3) of the VIII Corps at Fort Sam Houston, Texas. He was promoted to colonel in the Army of the United States (AUS) on 26 June 1941. For this service, he received a Commendation Ribbon. In December 1942, a year after America's entry into World War II, he joined the staff of Major General Alexander Patch's XIV Corps in the South Pacific Area, initially as Assistant Chief of Staff (G4), and then as Chief of Staff. He participated in the Guadalcanal campaign, for which he was awarded the Legion of Merit.

White returned to the United States with Patch in April 1943, to become Chief of Staff of Patch's new command, IV Corps, which was then based at Fort Lewis. IV Corps conducted training in Washington, and then desert warfare training in the California-Arizona Maneuver Area. In March 1944, IV Corps headquarters departed for North Africa. While most of the headquarters traveled by sea, Patch, White, Lieutenant Colonel William W. Quinn (G2), Colonel John S. Guthrie (G3), Lieutenant Colonel Eldon H. Larecy and Captain John M. Warner (Patch's aide) travelled by air in a C-54, arriving in Algiers on 2 March 1944.

On arrival, Patch discovered that the Commanding General North African Theater of Operations (NATOUSA), Lieutenant General Jacob L. Devers had appointed him to command the U.S. Seventh Army. The previous commanding general, Lieutenant General George S. Patton, had taken most of his staff to the European Theater of Operations, United States Army (ETOUSA), so Patch replaced them with members of his IV Corps staff. All of the officer's Patch had brought with him on the plane were transferred to Seventh Army, along with the G1, Lieutenant Colonel William H. Craig. All took up the corresponding post at the new headquarters, except for Larecy, who became deputy to the G4, Colonel Oliver C. Harvey, who remained from Patton's staff. All were in their thirties except White, who preferred to work with young officers.

The mission of the Seventh Army was Operation Anvil, codename for the Allied landing in the south of France. Patch and White traveled to London in May to confer about the operation with White's West Point classmate, Eisenhower, now a full general and the Supreme Allied Commander for the forthcoming Allied invasion of France, and Lieutenant General John C. H. Lee. While in England, White took the opportunity to visit Eton and St George's Chapel, Windsor Castle. In keeping with his new responsibilities, White was promoted to brigadier general (AUS) on 24 May 1944, although his substantive rank was of colonel from 1 June 1944. White served as Seventh Army Chief of Staff throughout the campaign in Southern France and later Germany, up until the end of World War II in Europe in May 1945. He was promoted to major general (AUS) on 15 November 1944 on the same promotion list as his West Point classmate, James Van Fleet. For his services with the Seventh Army White was awarded the Army Distinguished Service Medal and an oak leaf cluster and an oak leaf cluster to his Legion of Merit. He was also made an officer of the French Legion of Honor and awarded the Croix de Guerre with palm.

== Later life ==
White commanded the 75th Infantry Division, then in the process of preparing to redeploy to the Pacific, from June to November 1945. He then commanded the 71st Infantry Division in Bavaria until February 1946. He returned to the United States, where he assumed command of the V Corps Artillery, with the permanent rank of brigadier general from 1 August 1946. For this, he was awarded a second Commendation Ribbon. He was promoted to the permanent rank of major general again on 24 January 1948, with the substantive rank of brigadier general. His final command was of the 9th Infantry Division, which he assumed on 8 March 1948. He retired from Army on 30 September 1949, with the rank of major general on the retired list.

In retirement, White settled in Asheville, North Carolina, where he liked to hunt and fish and pursued his hobby of carpentry. He subsequently moved to Fayetteville, North Carolina, in 1971. On 5 November 1980, he suffered a stroke, and was hospitalized in the Fayetteville Veterans Administration Hospital, where he died on 21 October 1981, his 92nd birthday. He was survived by his wife Therese and son Colonel Arthur B. White. He was buried in Arlington National Cemetery.

== Notes ==
Military offices
Preceded by William W. Eagles	Commanding General 9th Infantry Division; 1948–1949	Succeeded by John M. Devine
Preceded by Onslow S. Rolfe	Commanding General 71st Infantry Division; 1945–1946	Succeeded by William Westmoreland
Preceded by Ray E. Porter	Commanding General 75th Infantry Division; June–October 1945	Succeeded by Charles R. Doran
