= Rich C. Staats =

United States Army general

Major General Rich C. Staats
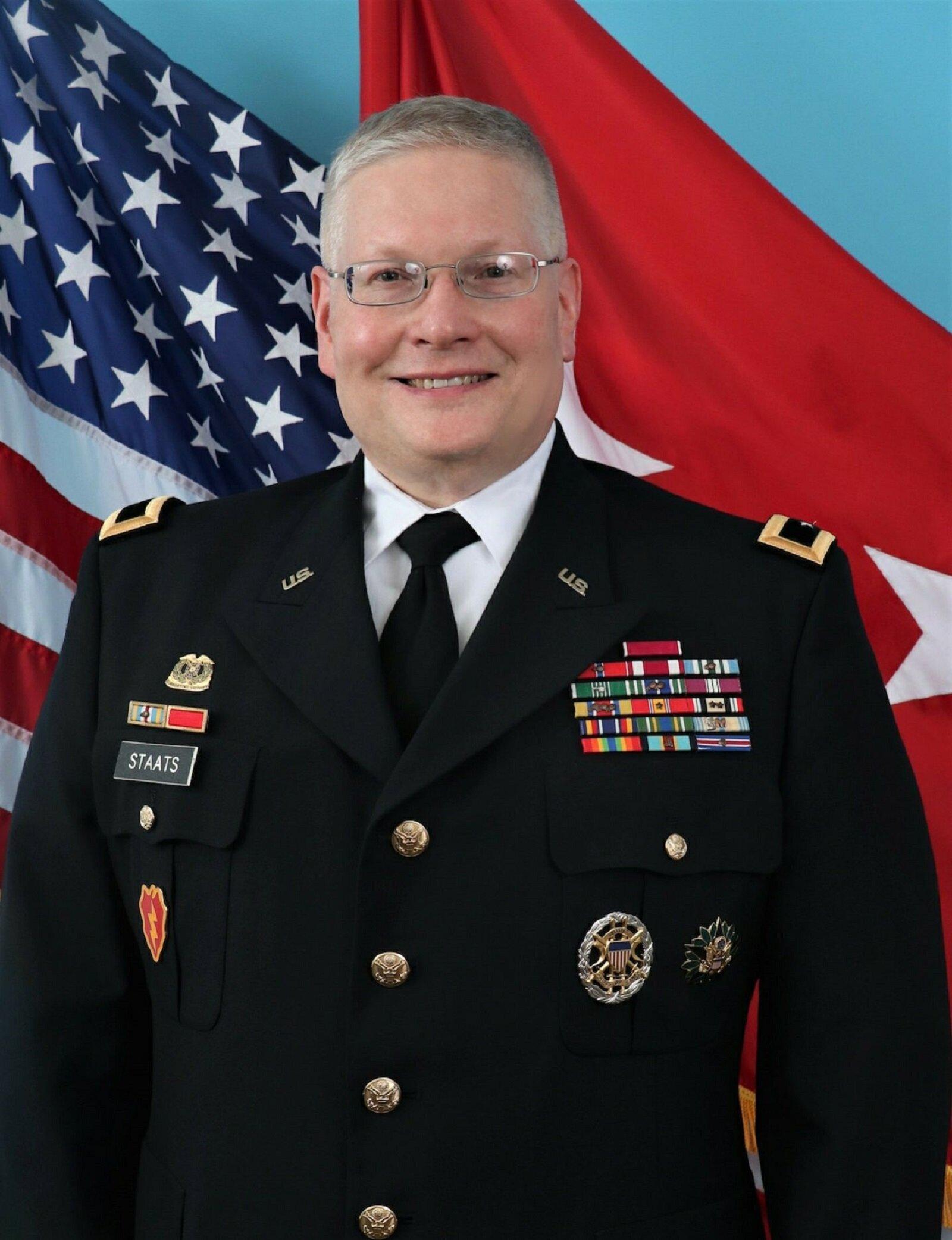
- Allegiance: United States
- Branch: United States Army
- Service years: 1978-2021
- Rank: Major General
- Commands: 75th Innovation Command; 316th Sustainment Command; 211th Regional Support Group
- Conflicts: Iraq War
- Awards: Legion of Merit; Bronze Star; Meritorious Service Medal

Richard C. Staats is a retired U.S. Army major general and former commanding general of the 75th Innovation Command.

== Career ==
Major General Rich Staats served as the Commanding General for the 75th Innovation Command, also known as the United States Army Reserve Innovation Command (USARIC).

Staats was commissioned at the United States Military Academy and served over 36 years of service in seven commands (2 companies, battalion, 2 brigades, 2 general officer commands) culminating in his command of 316th Sustainment Command (Expeditionary) and 75th Innovation Command. He served overseas in five commands including service in combat zones for three. Staats joint and interagency assignments include: Joint Staff, Defense Logistics Agency, Foreign Service Institute, and Multinational Force Iraq.

Staats military education consists of Quartermaster Corps company grade education, Joint and Combined Warfighting School, United States Army Command and General Staff College (Pershing Award), and the United States Army War College. Staats received a Ph.D. in Operations Research in 1994 from Massachusetts Institute of Technology as a Hertz Fellow, and a Masters in Strategic Studies from the US Army War College.

In civilian life Dr. Staats has been a contributor at think-tanks in the DC metro area for 25 years. Dr. Staats is a Distinguished Fellow for the Institute for Stability and Transition. He is a previous member of the Board of Trustees for the parent organization for the Texas A&M University system. His book contributions and published articles largely focus on artificial intelligence and the theoretical value of information. He has been in the game design community since the 1970s and is a commercial music producer.

He retired on July 15, 2021, after relinquishing command of the 75th Innovation Command on July 10.

== Awards and decorations ==
Staats' decorations and medals include:

- Legion of Merit
- Bronze Star Medal
- Meritorious Service Medal
- Joint Service Commendation Medal
- Army Commendation Medal
- Army Staff Identification Badge
- US State Department Superior Honor Award
- Joint Chiefs of Staff Identification Badge
- Polish Medal of Distinction

Military offices
Preceded by MG James V. "Boe" Young	Commanding general, 75th Innovation Command; 2019-present	Succeeded by None
