= 75th Innovation Command =

Formation, first in 1943, of the United States Army Reserve

75th Innovation Command (75IC)
- 75th Innovation Command shoulder sleeve insignia
- Active: 24 December 1942–14 November 1945 (75th Inf. Div.); 21 February 1952–15 February 1957 (75th MAC); 1 October 1993–1 December 2012 (75th Training Support Div.); 1 December 2012–January 2018 (75th Training Command); January 2018–present (75th Innovation Command)
- Country: United States
- Branch: United States Army Reserve
- Type: Future force development for the Army Reserve
- Size: Command
- Part of: United States Army Futures and Concepts Command
- Headquarters: Houston, Texas
- Motto: Make Ready
- Engagements: World War II; Rhineland; Ardennes-Alsace; Central Europe
- Decorations: Meritorious Unit Commendation

Commanders
- Commander: MG Michelle A. Link
- Command Sergeant Major: CSM Sherri L. Turner
- Notable commanders: MG Ray E. Porter

Insignia
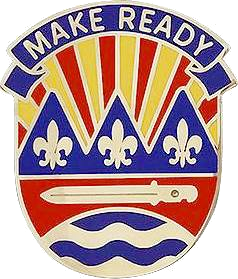
- Distinctive unit insignia

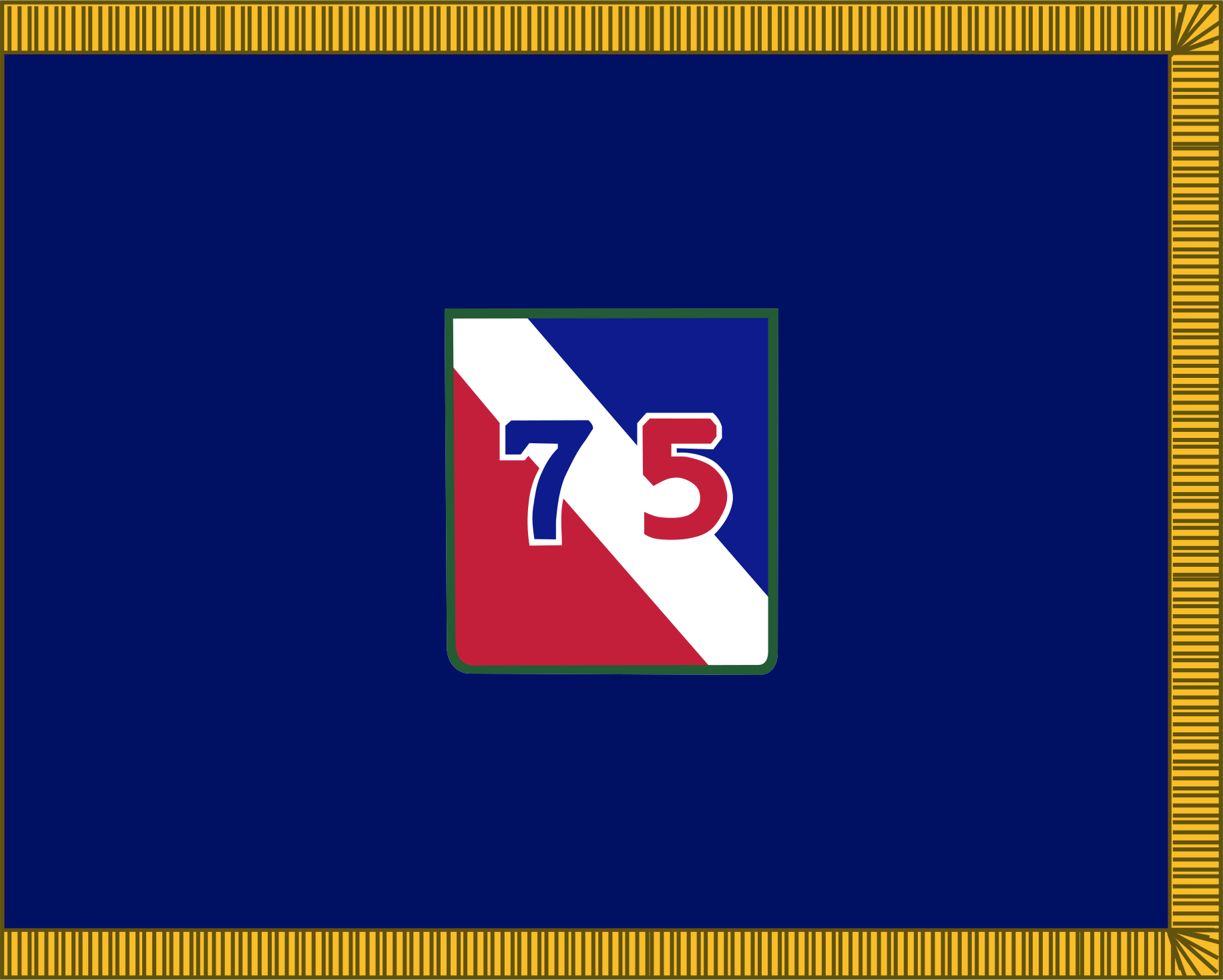
- 75th Innovation Command flag

The 75th Innovation Command (75th IC) is a separate command of the United States Army Reserve.

The 75th IC was activated as the 75th Infantry Division in World War II on April 15 1943. Inactivated in 1945, it was reactivated in 1952 at Houston, Texas, from the assets of the disbanded 22nd Armored Division of the United States Army Organized Reserves. It was active as an Infantry Division from 1952 to 1957, when it was reorganized and redesignated as the 75th Maneuver Area Command (MAC), and given responsibility for planning and conducting Field Training Exercises (FTX) and Command Post Exercises (CPX) for all Reserve Component units west of the Mississippi River.

In 1993, the 75th MAC was redesignated as the 75th Division (Training Support) in the Army Reserve. In January 2003, numerous units of the 75th were mobilized to train other Army Reserve and Army National Guard units deploying overseas in support of Operation Iraqi Freedom/Operation Enduring Freedom (OIF/OEF). On 1 December 2012, the army redesignated it the 75th Training Command. In January 2018, the 75th was reorganized into the 75th Innovation Command with its training divisions reassigned to the 84th Training Command.

== History ==
=== World War II ===
- Constituted 24 December 1942, in the Army of the United States as Headquarters, 75th Infantry Division.
- Activated 15 April 1943, at Fort Leonard Wood, Missouri.
- Moved to Louisiana Maneuver Area on 24 January 1944, where it participated in the Fourth Army # 6 Louisiana maneuvers.
- Transferred to Camp Breckinridge, Kentucky on 7 April 1944.
- Staged at Camp Shanks, New York, on 7 November 1944.
- Deployed from New York Port of Embarkation on 14 November 1944.
- Arrived in England on 22 November 1944. Some troops spent time training at Seabank Hotel in Porthcawl, Wales.
- Landed in France on 13 December 1944.
- Crossed over into the Netherlands on 18 December 1944.
- Withdrew to the Netherlands on 18 February 1945.
- Entered Germany on 10 March 1945.

==== Division organization ====
The 75th Infantry Division consisted of the following units.

75th Infantry Division organization (click to enlarge)

- 75th Infantry Division
  - 75th Infantry Division Headquarters
  - 75th Cavalry Reconnaissance Troop (Mechanized) (M3 scout cars and then M8 Greyhound armored cars)
  - 289th Infantry Regiment
    - Headquarters and Headquarters Company
    - 3× Infantry battalions
      - each battalion consists of: 1× Headquarters and Headquarters Company, 3× Rifle companies, 1× Heavy Weapons Company
    - Cannon Company (T12 Gun Motor Carriages and T19 Howitzer Motor Carriages, later replaced by either M3 105mm towed howitzers or M7 Priest self propelled howitzers)
    - Anti-Tank Company (M3 37mm anti-tank guns, which were replaced by 1944 with M1 57mm anti-tank guns)
    - Service Company
  - 290th Infantry Regiment
    - same organization as 289th Infantry Regiment
  - 291st Infantry Regiment
    - same organization as 289th Infantry Regiment
  - 75th Infantry Division Artillery
    - Headquarters and Headquarters Battery
    - 730th Field Artillery Battalion
      - Headquarters and Headquarters Battery
      - 3× Batteries (M1 155mm towed howitzers)
      - Service Battery
    - 897th Field Artillery Battalion
      - Headquarters and Headquarters Battery
      - 3× Batteries (M2 105mm towed howitzers)
      - Service Battery
    - 898th Field Artillery Battalion
      - same organization as 897th Field Artillery Battalion
    - 899th Field Artillery Battalion
      - same organization as 897th Field Artillery Battalion
  - Headquarters Special Troops
    - Headquarters Company, 75th Infantry Division
    - 575th Signal Company
    - 75th Quartermaster Company
    - 775th Ordnance Light Maintenance Company
    - Military Police Platoon
    - 75th Infantry Division Band (attached)
  - 275th Engineer Combat Battalion
    - Headquarters and Headquarters and Service Company
    - 3× Engineer combat companies
  - 375th Medical Battalion
    - Headquarters and Headquarters Detachment
    - 3× Collecting companies
    - Clearing Company

==== Combat chronicle ====
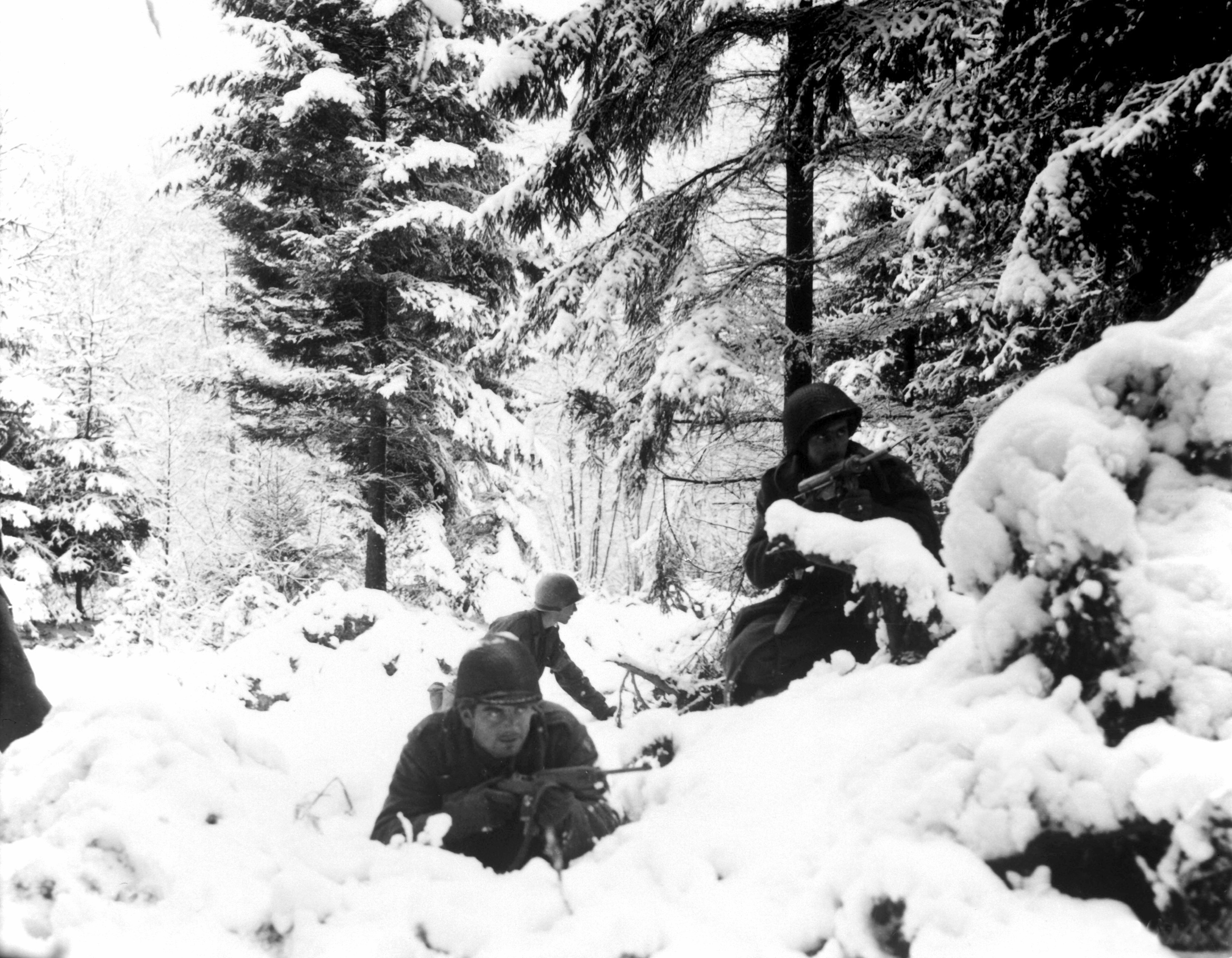
Soldiers of the 290th Infantry Regiment in the Ardennes during the Battle of the Bulge (Amonines, Belgium 4 January 1945)

The 75th Infantry Division arrived in Britain, 22 November 1944; headquarters having arrived on 2 November 1944. After a brief training program, the division landed at Le Havre and Rouen, 13 December, and bivouacked at Yvetot on the 14th. When the Von Rundstedt offensive broke in the Ardennes, the 75th was rushed to the front and entered defensive combat, 23 December 1944, alongside the Ourthe River, advanced to the Aisne River, and entered Grandmenil, 5 January 1945. The division relieved the 82d Airborne Division along the Salm River, 8 January, and strengthened its defensive positions until 17 January when it attacked, taking Vielsalm and other towns in the area.

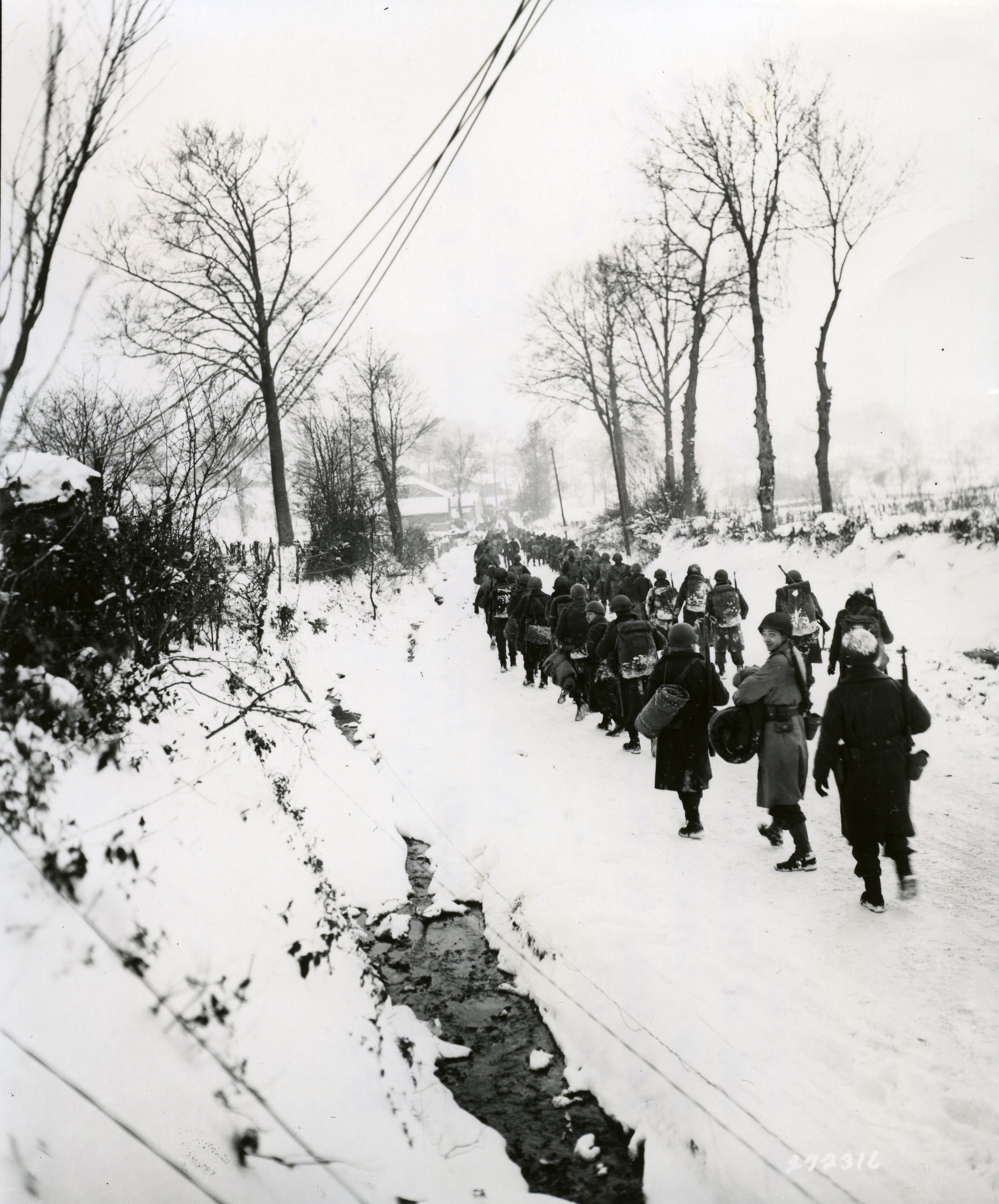
Men of the 75th Division trudge through the snow toward the Salm River, near Arbrefontaine, Belgium, to relieve the 82nd Airborne Division.

Shifting to the Seventh Army area in Alsace—Lorraine, the 75th crossed the Colmar Canal, 1 February, and took part in the liberation of Colmar and in the fighting between the Rhine River and the Vosges Mountains. It crossed the Marne-Rhine Canal and reached the Rhine, 7 February. After a brief rest at Lunéville, it returned to combat, relieving the 6th British Airborne Division on a 24-mile (39 km) defensive front along the Meuse (Maas), near Roermond, in the Netherlands, on 21 February. From 13 to 23 March, the 75th patrolled a sector along the west bank of the Rhine from Wesel to Homburg, and probed enemy defenses at night.

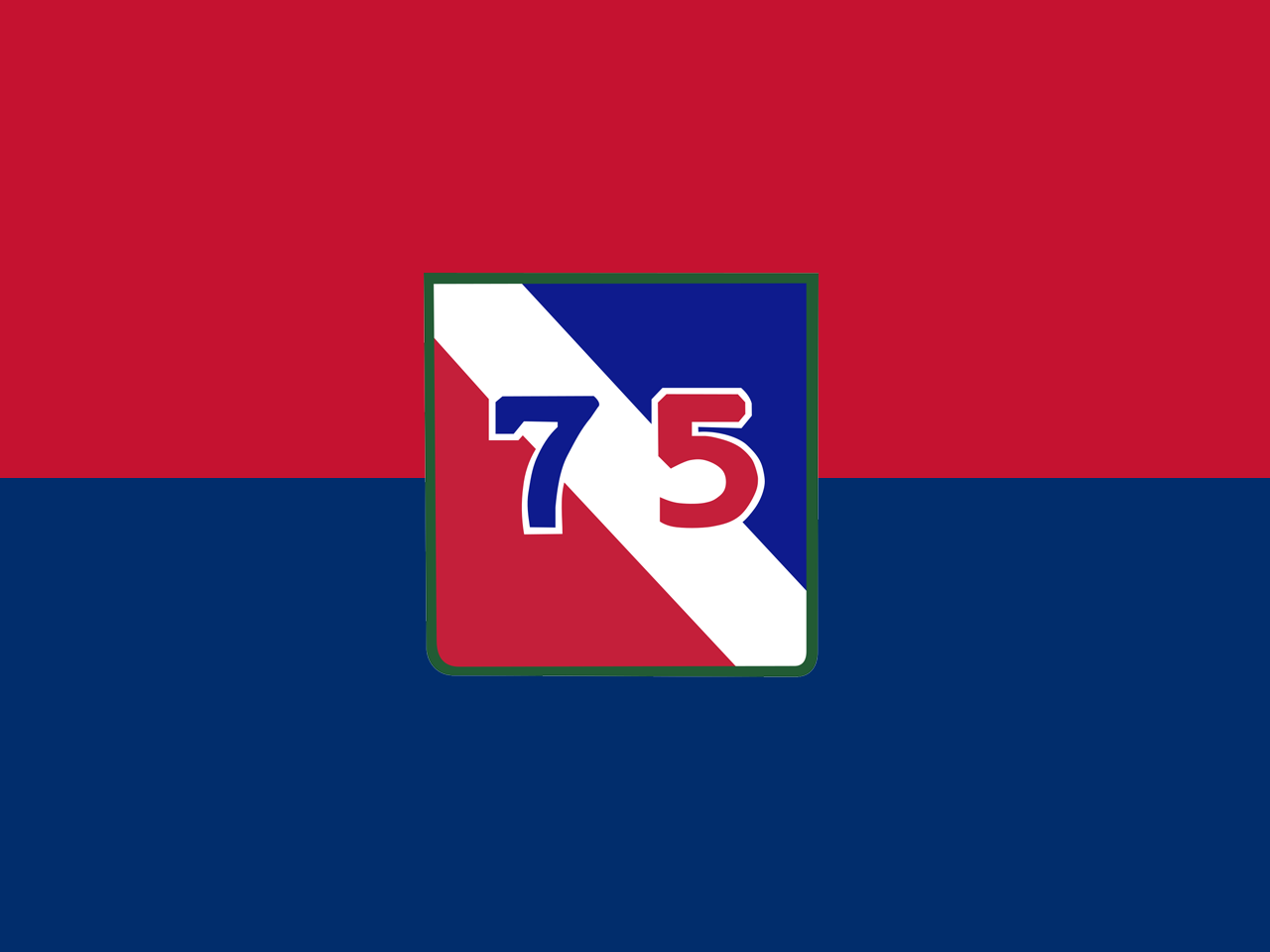
Flag of the United States Army 75th Infantry Division

On 24 March, elements crossed the Rhine in the wake of the 30th and 79th Divisions. Pursuit of the enemy continued as the 75th cleared the Haard Forest, 1 April, crossed the Dortmund-Ems Canal on the 4th, and cleared the approaches to Dortmund, which fell to the 95th Division, 13 April. Around the same time, troops of the division liberated Stalag VI-A, a POW camp where thousands of Soviet and Polish prisoners of war had died of malnutrition and disease. After taking Herdecke, 13 April, the division moved to Braumbauer for rest and rehabilitation, then took over security and military government duties in Westphalia. The father of Randy Pausch was wounded and received a Bronze Star during this time, as related in The Last Lecture.

The division was located at Werdohl, Germany, on 14 August 1945.

It returned to the Continental US at Hampton Roads Port of Embarkation on 14 November 1945, and proceeded to Camp Patrick Henry, Virginia.

The division was inactivated 14 November 1945, at Camp Patrick Henry, Virginia.

==== Assignments in the ETO ====
- 9 December 1944: 12th Army Group
- 9 December 1944: Ninth Army, 12th Army Group.
- 11 December 1944: XVI Corps.
- 22 December 1944: VII Corps, First Army (attached to the British 21st Army Group), 12th Army Group.
- 29 December 1944: XVIII (Abn) Corps.
- 2 January 1945: VII Corps.
- 7 January 1945: XVIII (Abn) Corps.
- 25 January 1945: 6th Army Group.
- 30 January 1945: XXI Corps, Seventh Army, 6th Army Group, but attached for operations to the First French Army, 6th Army Group.
- 11 February 1945: Seventh Army, 6th Army Group.
- 14 February 1945: 12th Army Group.
- 17 February 1945: Ninth Army, 12th Army Group, but attached to the British Second Army for operations and the British VIII Corps for administration.
- 1 March 1945: XVI Corps, Ninth Army, 12th Army Group.

==== Casualties ====
- Total battle casualties: 4,324
- Killed in action: 817
- Wounded in action: 3,314
- Missing in action: 77
- Prisoner of war: 116

=== Post War ===
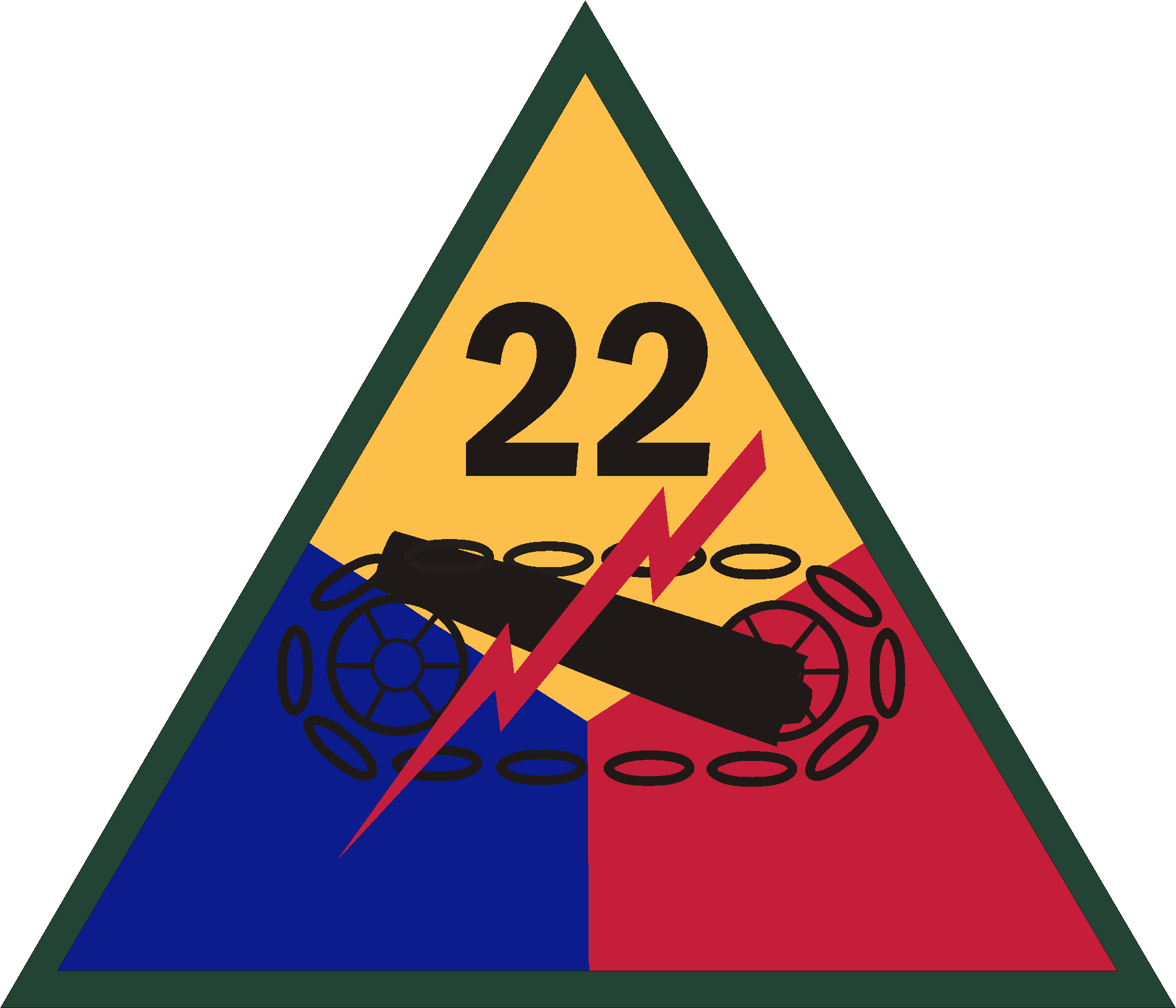

On 21 February 1952, the division was allocated to the Organized Reserve Corps. It was activated on 1 March 1952, at Houston, Texas. The reborn 75th Infantry Division appears to have been "reflagged" from the inactivating 22nd Armored Division. In July 1952 the Organized Reserve Corps was redesignated the Army Reserve. The division was inactivated on 15 February 1957 in Houston. At that point the Army's official lineage for the division falls silent for over 40 years. Technically the division was only redesignated and activated in October 1993.

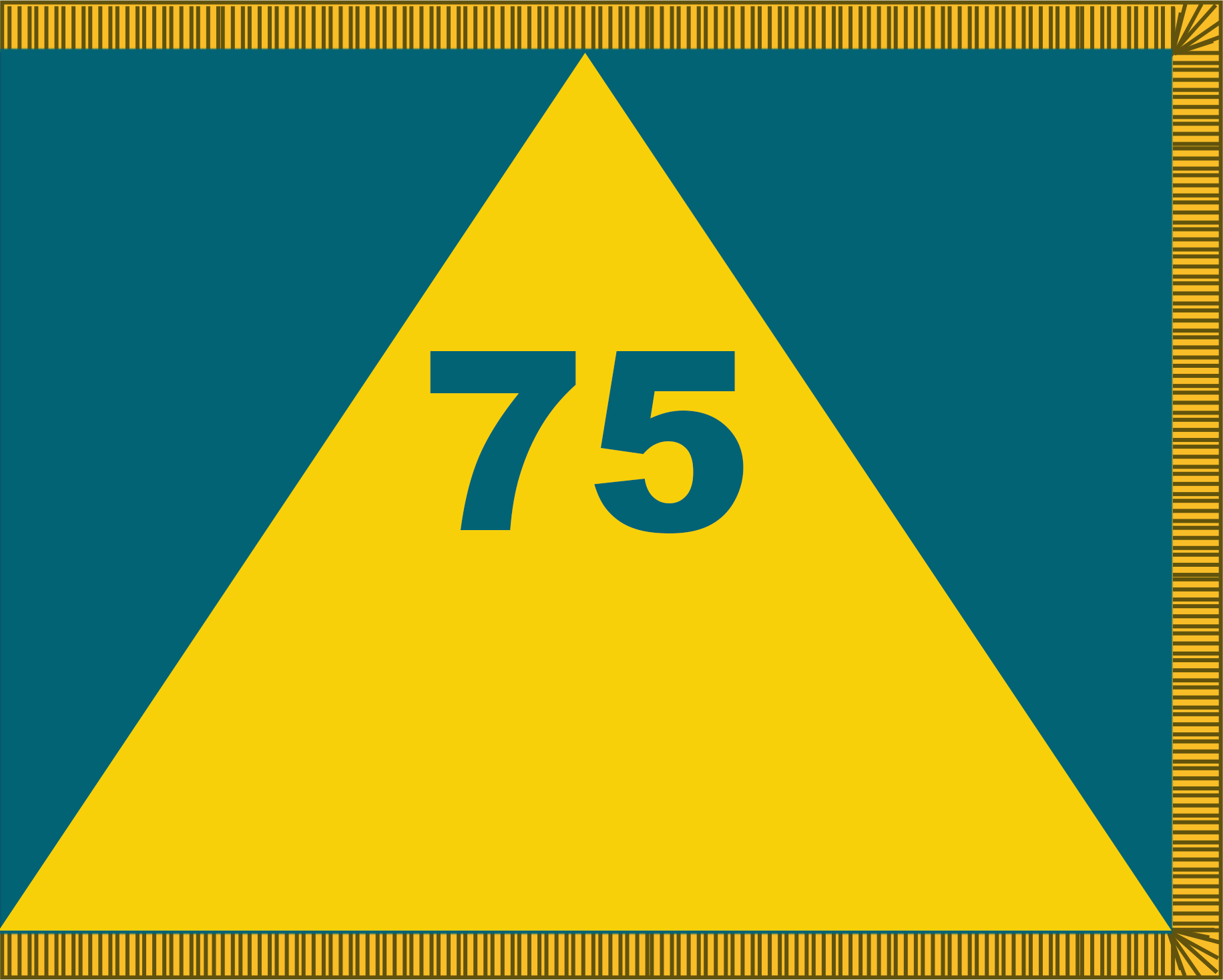
75th Maneuver Area Command flag

However, the day the division was inactivated in 1957, the 75th Maneuver Area Command (MAC) was formed, in the same location, Houston, Texas.

On 1 October 1993 it was redesignated as Headquarters, 75th Division (Exercise) and activated, again at Houston, Texas. It was then reorganized and redesignated on 17 October 1999 as Headquarters, 75th Division (Training Support).

The Army's official lineage for the division does not appear to have been updated since 2001. However, since that time, the division was:

- Redesignated 2 November 2007 as 75th Battle Command Training Division (BCTD)
- Redesignated 1 October 2011 as 75th Training Division (Mission Command), later 75th Training Command (Mission Command)

The 75th Training Command (Mission Command) was made up of a HHC and five subordinate divisions, each of which is separated into three training brigades. The 75th Training Command (MC) and its subordinate divisions were the only entities that have the mission and capability to train reserve component forces in the full Mission Command Staff Training (MCST) continuum. The command carried out MCST in all phases of the Army Force Generation (ARFORGEN) culminating in the preparation of battalions, brigades and higher-level headquarters (HQs) for deployment in the available phase of the ARFORGEN rotation. The command's Vision Statement was "To be the premier provider of realistic and relevant battle-focused command and staff training in a digital (Army Battle Command System (ABCS) contemporary operating environment, making the total force ready for any worldwide mission."

In January 2018, the 75th Training Command was re-designated as the 75th Innovation Command. All previously subordinate units outside of headquarters and headquarters company were reassigned to the 84th Training Command. It is also now known as the U.S. Army Reserve Innovation Command (USARIC).

Current Mission: "The 75th Innovation Command drives operational innovation, concepts, and capabilities to enhance the readiness and lethality of the Future Force by leveraging the unique skills, agility, and private sector connectivity of America's Army Reserve." USARIC is designed to be in direct support of Transformation and Training Command. With a requirement for senior officers and NCOs to research and publish thought leadership, there are several publications across disciplines by its members.

Current Commander and Command Sergeant Major are MG Martin F. Klein and CSM Kristal Florquist. Current Deputy Commander is BG Robert E. Guidry.

USARIC Headquarters and Headquarters Company – Houston, Texas

- Headquarters and Headquarters Company – Houston, Texas
- Innovation Army Application Group - Austin, Texas
  - Group 1
  - Group 2
  - Group 3
- Support Group - Aberdeen Proving Ground

== Honors and awards ==
=== Campaign participation credit ===
- World War II:
1. Rhineland;
2. Ardennes-Alsace;
3. Central Europe

=== Awards ===
- Meritorious Unit Commendation (Army) for EUROPEAN THEATER, HHC, 1st Brigade, 75th Division (now HHC, Southern Division, 75th Training Command)
- Army Superior Unit Award Streamer Embroidered 2003 (all UICs received one)
- Army Superior Unit Award Streamer Embroidered 2006

=== Individual awards ===
- Distinguished Service Cross-4
- Silver Star-114
- Legion of Merit-3
- Soldier's Medal-21
- Bronze Star Medal-1,288
- Air Medal-29

== Commanders ==
1. MG Willard S. Paul (April – August 1943)
2. MG Fay B. Prickett (August 1943 – January 1945)
3. MG Ray E. Porter (January – June 1945)
4. MG Arthur Arnim White (June – November 1945)
5. BG Charles R. Doran (October 1945 to inactivation)
6. BG Whitfield Jack (March 1952 to May 1955) (as 75th Infantry Division (Reserve))
7. MG Whitfield Jack (May 1955 to February 1957)
8. MG Whitfield Jack (February 1957 to January 1960) (as 75th Maneuver Area Command)
9. MG George P. Munson, Jr. (November 1960 to May 1965)
10. MG Felix A. Davis (May 1965 to May 1975)
11. MG Kenneth A. Kuykendal (May 1975 to May 1979)
12. MG Robert E. Crosser (May 1979 to August 1981)
13. MG Harry A. Conrad (August 1981 to August 1984)
14. MG Guilford J. Wilson, Jr. (October 1984 to April 1989)
15. MG Dionel E. Aviles (April 1989 to April 1993)
16. MG Claude J. Roberts (April 1993 to December 1996) (as 75th Division (Exercise))
17. MG Darrell W. McDaniel (January 1997 to December 2000) (as 75th Division (Training Support))
18. MG Perry V. Dalby (December 2000 to May 2004)
19. MG Steven P. Best (May 2004 to August 2008) (as 75th Training Division (Battle Command))
20. MG Eldon P. Regua (August 2008 to July 2011)
21. MG Jimmie Jaye Wells (July 2011 to May 2014) (as 75th Training Command (Mission Command))
22. MG James V. "Boe" Young (May 2014 to May 2019)
23. MG Rich C. Staats (May 2019 to July 2021)
24. MG Martin F. Klein (August 2021 to June 2024)
25. MG Michelle A. Link (June 2024 to Present)

== Command Sergeants Major ==
1. CSM Roger M. Casteel (January 1970 to March 1973)
2. CSM Wilfred H. Mathis, Jr. (April 1973 to July 1982)
3. CSM Obie B. Johnson (July 1982 to January 1987)
4. CSM Richard J. Danielson (January 1987 to April 1993)
5. CSM Richard J. Danielson (April 1993 to June 1993)
6. CSM Lawrence W. Holland (June 1993 to May 1996)
7. CSM Philip R. Kraus (May 1996 to September 1999)
8. CSM John Proffit (October 1999 to August 2001)
9. CSM Jerry A. Blair (December 2001 to December 2005)
10. CSM Thomas Boyce (December 2005 to November 2007)
11. CSM Thomas Boyce (November 2007 to August 2008)
12. CSM Paul Belanger (August 2008 to August 2011)
13. CSM Luther Thomas (August 2011 to September 2011)
14. CSM Luther Thomas (October 2011 to November 2012)
15. CSM Ronnie Farmer (November 2012 to October 2016)
16. CSM Richard T. Schoenberger (October 2016 to April 2019)
17. CSM Krystal Florquist (April 2019 - June 2023)
18. CSM Sherri L. Turner (June 2023 - present)

== Notable members ==
- J. W. Milam – Small businessman in Mississippi, known for confessing to lynching black teenager Emmett Till in a magazine interview after acquittal by a local all-white jury
- Father of Randy Pausch, author of The Last Lecture
- Andy Field, noted voice actor

== General ==
- Shoulder patch: Khaki-bordered square with diagonal fields of blue, white, and red on which is superimposed a blue 7 and red 5.

== See also ==
- Defense Innovation Unit
- Marine Innovation Unit
- AFWERX (Air Force) and SpaceWERX (Space Force)
