= Ray E. Porter =

United States Army general (1891–1963)

- Born: Ray Edison Porter; July 29, 1891; Fordyce, Arkansas, United States
- Died: August 10, 1963 (aged 72); Little Rock, Arkansas, United States
- Military career
- Allegiance: United States
- Branch: United States Army
- Service years: 1917–1953
- Rank: Major General
- Unit: Infantry Branch
- Commands: Fifteenth United States Army; 75th Infantry Division; US Army, Caribbean; 101st Airborne Division
- Conflicts: World War I; World War II; African campaign; Colmar Pocket
- Awards: Distinguished Service Cross; Distinguished Service Medal; Legion of Merit; Bronze Star; Purple Heart; Croix de Guerre

Ray Edison Porter (July 29, 1891 – August 10, 1963) was a U.S. Army Major General. In World War II he served on the Africa campaign, in the War Department, and then led the 75th Infantry Division. Dwight D. Eisenhower named him as one of fifty who took over the Army Service Forces' Project Planning Division, the Special Planning Division or SPD.

== Biography ==
Major General Ray E. Porter, U.S. Army, Retired was born at Fordyce, Arkansas on 29 July 1891, the son of William and Hattie E. Porter. He received his education at Fordyce High School and at the University of Arkansas. On 21 May 1921, he was married to Maude Garner, daughter of John W. Garner and Mrs Effie Garner of Fordyce. He had three children: Colonel Ray E. Porter, Jr, Mrs. Peggy Northington, and Mrs Patricia Burke. General Porter, his son, Colonel Ray E. Porter jr, and grandson, Colonel Ray E. Porter III are the first third generation graduates of the US Army War College at Carlisle Barracks, PA. (1937, 1961, & 1988)

Shortly after the American entry into World War I in April 1917, Porter entered the military service with the First Officers' Training Camp at Fort Logan H. Roots, Arkansas, 15 May, receiving his first Army commission in the Officers' Reserve Corps 15 August of the same year. He was appointed a Second Lieutenant of Infantry in the Regular Army on 26 October 1917 and progressed through the successive grades of the Regular Army to his appointment as a Major General, 21 September 1943.

During the war, Porter served with Company E, 34th Infantry Regiment, 7th Division in combat on the Western Front. He was awarded the American Distinguished Service Cross and the French Croix de Guerre for gallantry in action 1–2 November 1918, shortly before the armistice with Germany which ended the war. The citation for his DSC reads:

The President of the United States of America, authorized by Act of Congress, July 9, 1918, takes pleasure in presenting the Distinguished Service Cross to Captain (Infantry) Ray E. Porter, United States Army, for extraordinary heroism in action while serving with 34th Infantry Regiment, 7th Division, A.E.F., near Rembercourt, France, November 1–2, 1918. Captain Porter led his company in a successful assault on a ridge of high ground, taking several strong points and machine-gun nests and numerous prisoners. He had this position for 30 hours without food or water against two enemy counterattacks, until he was relieved.

Remaining in the army during the interwar period, Porter graduated from the Company Officers Course (1928) and the Advanced Course (1932) of the Infantry School, Fort Benning, Georgia; The Command and General Staff School (1935), Fort Leavenworth, Kansas and the Army War College (1937), Washington, D.C. Other service of that period included duty as Professor of Military Science and Tactics, Ouachita Baptist College, Arkadelphia, Arkansas; (1922–1927) a tour of foreign service with the 19th Infantry in Hawaii, (1928–1931) and instructor at the Command and General Staff School, Fort Leavenworth, Kansas, 1937-1940.

In World War II he took part in the assault landing of the Allied Forces at Algiers, North Africa in November 1942 and served as Deputy Chief of Staff at General Eisenhower's Advance Headquarters during the Tunisian campaign. Returning to the United States after the German surrender in North Africa, he was assigned as Assistant Chief of Staff, G-3 (Organization and Training), War Department General Staff. For his services he was awarded the Army Distinguished Service Medal, with the medal's citation reading:

The President of the United States of America, authorized by Act of Congress July 9, 1918, takes pleasure in presenting the Army Distinguished Service Medal to Major General Ray E. Porter (ASN: 0-7168), United States Army, for exceptionally meritorious and distinguished services to the Government of the United States, in a duty of great responsibility, during the period from 25 May 1943 to 13 February 1945.

When the Germans attacked in the Battle of the Bulge during December 1944, Porter was flown immediately to the European Theater of Operations where he assumed command of the 75th Infantry Division in combat until the end of hostilities in that theater. He briefly commanded the Fifteenth Army from 8 to 16 January 1945. Shortly after Victory in Europe Day he was again called home for duty as Chief of the Special Planning Division, War Department Special Staff.

From 1948 to 1951, Porter commanded the United States Army in the Caribbean with his headquarters at Fort Amador, Canal Zone. His command included the United States Army forces and activities in Panama and Puerto Rico and the United States Army Missions in the numerous republics of Central and South America.

He was retired from Camp Breckinridge, Kentucky, where he had commanded the Replacement Training Center and the 101st Airborne Division, 30 June 1953.

== Awards and decorations ==
Porter's decorations and medals include:

United States

- Distinguished Service Cross
- Distinguished Service Medal
- Legion of Merit
- Bronze Star Medal
- Army Commendation Medal
- Purple Heart
- Eight Campaign Medals

Foreign

- Officer of the Legion of Honor (France)
- Grand Officer of the Order of Orange-Nassau (Netherlands)
- Honorary Commander of the Order of the British Empire (Great Britain)
- Grand Officer of the Order of Boyaca (Republic of Colombia)
- Grand Officer of the Order of Vasco Núñez de Balboa (Republic of Panama)
- Cavalier of the Legion of Honor (France)
- Order of Abdon Calderón, First Class (Ecuador)
- Medal of Military Merit, First Class (Republic of Chile)
- Croix de Guerre with Palm and Gold Star (France)
- Croix de Guerre with Palm (Belgium)
- Order of Eloy Alfaro (Foundation of International Eloy Alfaro)

== Promotions ==
- Second Lieutenant, Officers Reserve Corps - 15 August 1917
- Second Lieutenant Infantry, Regular Army - 26 October 1917
- First Lieutenant - 26 October 1917
- Captain (temporary) - 6 May 1919
- Captain, Regular Army - 1 July 1920
- Major, Regular Army- 1 August 1935
- Lieutenant Colonel, Regular Army - 18 August 1938
- Colonel (temporary) - 24 December 1941
- Brigadier General (temporary) - 1 August 1942
- Major General(temporary) - 21 September 1943
- Major General, Regular Army - 1948 with rank from 8 October 1944

Military offices
Preceded by Fay B. Prickett	Commanding General 75th Infantry Division; January−June 1945	Succeeded by A. Arnim White
Preceded by Cornelius E. Ryan	Commanding General 101st Airborne Division; 1951−1953	Succeeded by Paul D. Adams
