= Hobart R. Gay =

United States Army general

Hobart Raymond Gay
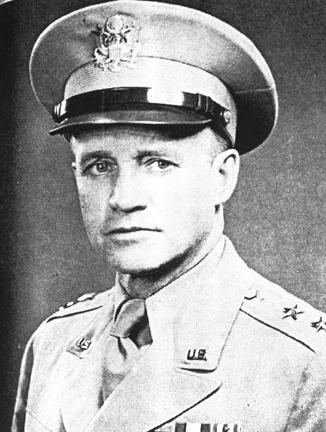
- Hobert R. Gay, pictured here wearing the two stars of a major general.
- Born: May 16, 1894; Rockport, Illinois, United States
- Died: August 19, 1983 (aged 89); El Paso, Texas, United States
- Burial place: Fort Bliss National Cemetery, Texas, United States
- Education: Knox College (BS)
- Military career
- Allegiance: United States
- Branch: United States Army
- Service years: 1917–1955
- Rank: Lieutenant General
- Nickname: "Hap"
- Service number: 0-7323
- Units: Cavalry Branch; Quartermaster Corps
- Commands: Fifteenth Army; 1st Armored Division; Military District of Washington; 1st Cavalry Division; VI Corps; III Corps; Fifth Army; Anti-aircraft and Guided Missile Center
- Conflicts: World War I World War II; Korean War
- Awards: Distinguished Service Cross (2); Army Distinguished Service Medal (2); Silver Star (3); Legion of Merit (2); Bronze Star (2)
- Other work: Superintendent of the New Mexico Military Institute

Lieutenant General Hobart Raymond Gay (May 16, 1894 – August 19, 1983), nicknamed "Hap", was a United States Army officer who served in numerous conflicts, including World War II, where he worked closely alongside General George S. Patton, and later in the Korean War, where he commanded the 1st Cavalry Division.

== Early military career ==
He was first commissioned into the Army Reserve as a 2nd lieutenant following his graduation from Knox College in 1917. He played as a halfback on the Knox College football team and earned a Bachelor of Science degree.

On October 26, 1917, over six months after the American entry into World War I, Gay was commissioned into the Regular Army as a cavalry officer. He was promoted to 1st lieutenant on October 26, 1917, and captain in July 1920. In his early career, he was a cavalry officer. As a captain, he tutored author Robert A. Heinlein in equitation and musketry.

He transferred to the Quartermaster Corps June 11, 1934, and was promoted to major on August 1, 1935. He was promoted to lieutenant colonel on August 18, 1940, and then to colonel in the Army of the United States (AUS) on December 24, 1941, shortly after the United States entered World War II.

== World War II ==
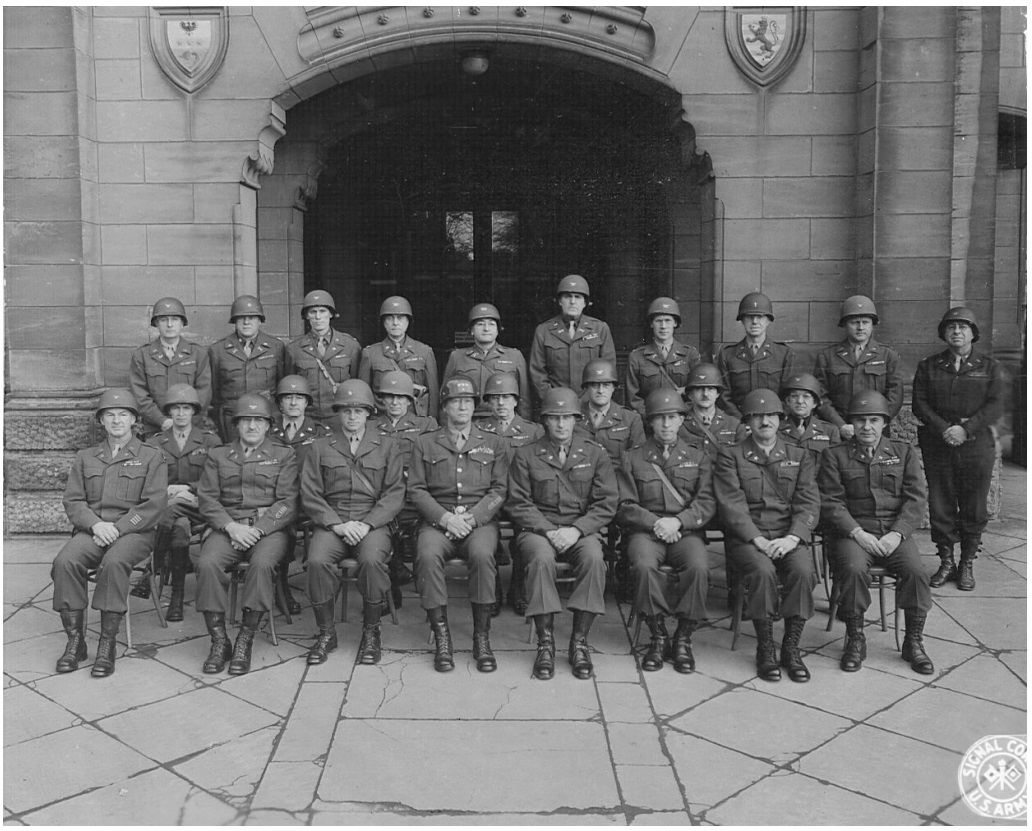
General George S. Patton and members of his Third Army staff, 1945. Sat to Patton's right is his chief of staff, Brigadier General Hobart R. Gay.

Gay was awarded the Silver Star in December 1942 for gallantry in action on November 8, 1942, in Casablanca. He was chief of staff of the I Armored Corps, commanded by General George S. Patton, in North Africa at the time. Gay would continue to serve as Patton's chief of staff until Patton's death in December 1945.

Gay was promoted to brigadier general (AUS) on June 24, 1943. In the Sicily campaign he was assigned to the U.S. Seventh Army, under Patton, as chief of staff. He became deputy chief of staff of the U.S. Third Army, again under Patton, in February 1944 and replaced Hugh Joseph Gaffey as chief of staff in December. In this capacity, Gay was a key member of Patton's command staff during the Third Army's drive into Germany following the Normandy landings. In November 1944 he was awarded the Distinguished Service Cross (DSC), the citation for which reads:

The President of the United States of America, authorized by Act of Congress, July 9, 1918, takes pleasure in presenting the Distinguished Service Cross to Major General [then Brigadier General] Hobart Raymond Gay (ASN: 0-7323), United States Army, for extraordinary heroism in connection with military operations against an armed enemy while serving with Headquarters, 3d Army, in action against enemy forces on 11 November 1944. When the operations of the 90th Infantry Division of the Third Army were in great peril, General Gay made an inspection of the bridging operations over the flooded Moselle and of the forward elements of the Division east of the Moselle from Malling to Keonigmacker. In spite of intense enemy fires from small arms, artillery, high velocity direct fire weapons, General Gay continued his mission inspiring all ranks by his cool and courageous conduct and sound and encouraging advice. His presence and assistance at this critical moment lent new confidence to the command and insured the continued bold and determined advance to objectives. Major General Gay's gallant leadership, personal bravery and zealous devotion to duty exemplify the highest traditions of the military forces of the United States and reflect great credit upon himself, the 3d Army, and the United States Army.

He was promoted to major general (AUS) on March 20, 1945, shortly before the end of World War II in Europe.

When Patton took command of the U.S. Fifteenth Army in October 1945, Gay was again his chief of staff. He and Patton went pheasant hunting on December 9, 1945. Patton and Gay were seated in the back seat of the staff car, en route to the hunting lodge. There was a traffic accident, during which Patton sustained spinal injuries which later cost him his life. General Gay was uninjured.

After Patton's death, Gay assumed command of the Fifteenth Army in January 1946 for a period of one month. He then became commander of the U.S. 1st Armored Division until its return to the United States later in 1946. He then assumed command of the Second Constabulary Brigade. He served in Europe until 1947, when he returned to the United States. Gay then commanded the Military District of Washington until September 1949.

== Korean War ==
In September 1949, Gay took command of the 1st Cavalry Division in Osaka, Japan. He brought the 1st Cavalry to Korea, where it was in action on July 19, 1950, joining in the general South Korean-U.S. retreat before the North Korean invasion force. It was during this period that earned Gay an oak leaf cluster to his DSC.

The President of the United States of America, under the provisions of the Act of Congress approved July 9, 1918, takes pleasure in presenting a Bronze Oak Leaf Cluster in lieu of a Second Award of the Distinguished Service Cross to Major General Hobart Raymond Gay (ASN: 0-7323), United States Army, for extraordinary heroism in connection with military operations against an armed enemy of the United Nations while as Commanding General of the 1st Cavalry Division. Major General Gay distinguished himself by extraordinary heroism in action against enemy aggressor forces in the Republic of Korea during the period from 18 July to 1 October 1950. During this period, although faced by overwhelming numerical superiority, General Gay so skillfully led his Division that the enemy's advance was slowed and ultimately halted along the Naktong River Line. His continuous presence at the front under enemy artillery, mortar, and small-arms fire with total disregard for his own personal safety was an inspiration to his men during the critical period of the United Nations buildup. On 25 September 1950, the Division made a break-through at Tabu-dong. General Gay joined the task force formed to exploit the success, placing his quarter-ton vehicle behind the two leading tanks, taking part in numerous firefights. In one instance the lead tank was hit by enemy antitank fire, halting the column. Realizing the seriousness of the situation and the necessity for pushing forward, General Gay made his way under enemy fire to the lead tank and personally directed accurate fire at the enemy antitank guns, which eliminated them. His aggressive leadership, courage under fire, and personal heroism, enable the task force to continue its rapid advance and prevented the enemy from organizing a defensive position which would have nullified the breakthrough.

His 1st Cavalry Division then played a crucial, albeit costly, role in the successful last-ditch defense of the Pusan Perimeter, and joined in the breakout of U.S. and South Korean units headed north in September in conjunction with the landing of U.S. forces at Inchon. Gay's troops then led the strike across the 38th Parallel and into Pyongyang, capturing the North Korean capital on October 19–20. Two weeks later, his 8th Cavalry Regiment was hit hard by newly arriving Chinese Communist forces at Unsan, north of Pyongyang, with one battalion left trapped when Gay's rescue efforts were ordered halted by his superior, I Corps commander Major General Frank W. Milburn. The Chinese drove the 1st Cavalry Division and other U.S. forces from North Korea in December, and in early 1951 Gay, along with other top officers in Korea, was relieved of his command. Despite this, he was awarded the Army Distinguished Service Medal for his service in Korea. The medal's citation reads as follows:

The President of the United States of America, authorized by Act of Congress July 9, 1918, takes pleasure in presenting a Bronze Oak Leaf Cluster in lieu of a Second Award of the Army Distinguished Service Medal to Major General Hobart Raymond Gay (ASN: 0-7323), United States Army, for exceptionally meritorious and distinguished services to the Government of the United States, in a duty of great responsibility as Commanding General, 1st Cavalry Division, in Korea, from 8 July 1950 to 15 February 1951.

Gay was appointed deputy commander of the U.S. Fourth Army in February 1951. In July 1952 he was appointed commander of U.S. VI Corps at Camp Atterbury, Indiana and in April, 1953 made commanding general of U.S. III Corps at Fort MacArthur, California. He moved to Fort Hood in Texas when the III Corps was reassigned there.

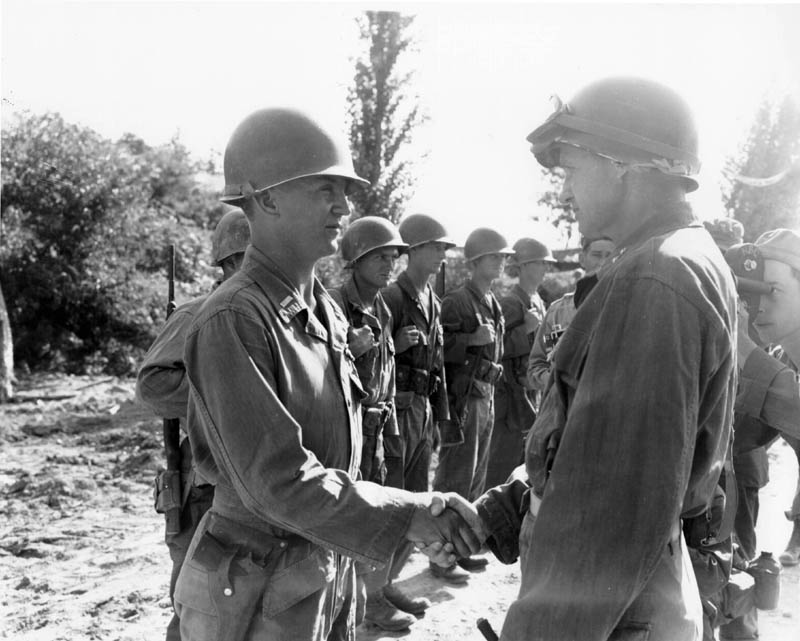
Major General Hobart R. Gay, CG, 1st Cavalry Division, congratulates Second Lieutenant Raymond A. Whelan after awarding him the Silver Star for meritorious services in Korea, August 25, 1950.

=== No Gun Ri Massacre ===
Over three days in late July 1950, the division's 7th Cavalry Regiment and U.S. warplanes killed a large number of South Korean refugees at No Gun Ri, an event first confirmed by The Associated Press in 1999 and later acknowledged in a U.S. Army investigation. The South Korean government in 2005 certified the names of 163 No Gun Ri dead and missing and 55 wounded, and said many more likely were killed. On July 26, the day the No Gun Ri killings began, Gay told rear-echelon reporters he was sure most refugees fleeing south were North Korean infiltrators. Two days earlier, word had been sent from his operations staff to fire on all refugees trying to cross U.S. lines. Gay later described refugees as "fair game," and the U.S. ambassador in South Korea said such a policy had been adopted theater-wide.

== Later service, retirement, and death ==
In September 1954 General Gay was made commander of U.S. Fifth Army in Chicago, Illinois. He was nominated by President Dwight D. Eisenhower in October 1954 for promotion to Lieutenant General (temporary).

Hobart R. Gay's career in the U.S. Army ended in 1955 as the Commanding General, Anti-aircraft and Guided Missile Center, Fort Bliss, Texas.

Following retirement, Gay became superintendent of the New Mexico Military Institute. He died in El Paso, Texas, and was interred at the Fort Bliss National Cemetery.

== Awards and decorations ==
Lieutenant General Hobert G. Gay's awards and decorations include:

Decorations

Distinguished Service Cross with bronze oak leaf cluster
Army Distinguished Service Medal with bronze oak leaf cluster
Silver Star with two bronze oak leaf clusters
Legion of Merit with bronze oak leaf cluster
Bronze Star with bronze oak leaf cluster
Air Medal with bronze oak leaf cluster
Army Commendation Medal

Unit Award

Army Meritorious Unit Commendation

Service Medals

World War I Victory Medal
American Defense Service Medal
American Campaign Medal
European-African-Middle Eastern Campaign Medal with Arrowhead device and silver campaign star
World War II Victory Medal
Army of Occupation Medal
National Defense Service Medal
Korean Service Medal with three bronze campaign stars

Foreign Awards

Distinguished Service Order (United Kingdom)
Legion of Honour (Chevalier)
Legion of Honour (Officier)
French Croix de guerre (device(s) unknown)
Order of the Patriotic War First Class (Union of Soviet Socialist Republics)
Order of the White Lion Class II (Czechoslovakia)
Czechoslovak War Cross
Republic of Korea Presidential Unit Citation
United Nations Korea Medal
Korean War Service Medal

== Media portrayal ==
In the film Patton (1970), the character of Brigadier General Hobart Carver, played by Michael Strong, was based on Gay. In the 1986 telefilm The Last Days of Patton, Gay was portrayed by Murray Hamilton.

== Notes ==
1. "1950".
2. "Veterans: Other Incidents of Refugees Killed by GIs During Korea Retreat". Pulitzer Prize Winners website. Archived from the original on 2005-10-27.
