= Willard Stewart Paul =

United States Army general

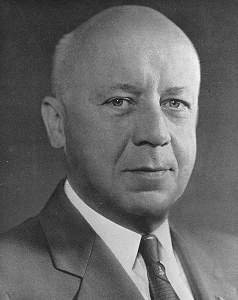
- Lieutenant General Willard S. Paul as President of Gettysburg College in the late 1950s.
- Born: February 28, 1894; Worcester, Massachusetts, United States
- Died: March 21, 1966 (aged 72); Walter Reed Army Hospital, Washington, D.C., United States
- Burial place: Arlington National Cemetery, Virginia, United States
- Military career
- Allegiance: United States
- Branch: United States Army
- Service years: 1916−1948
- Rank: Lieutenant General
- Service number: 0-5616
- Unit: Field Artillery Branch
- Commands: 75th Infantry Division; 26th Infantry Division
- Conflicts: Pancho Villa Expedition; World War I World War II
- Awards: Army Distinguished Service Medal (2); Legion of Merit
- Other work: President, Gettysburg College

Lieutenant General Willard Stewart Paul (February 28, 1894 – March 21, 1966) was a senior United States Army officer who commanded the 26th Infantry Division during World War II.

== Early life and military career ==
He was born in Worcester, Massachusetts, on February 28, 1894. He attended Clark University in Worcester, Massachusetts, and American University in Washington, D.C.

In 1916 Paul joined the Colorado Army National Guard as a second lieutenant in the Field Artillery Branch to serve on the Mexican border during the Pancho Villa Expedition.

He received a commission in the Regular Army in 1917, after the American entry into World War I. During the war he served at Camp Merritt, New Jersey. Like many others who became general officers in World War II, Paul did not serve overseas.

== Between the wars ==
The war came to an end on November 11, 1918. Paul, remaining in the army during the interwar years, graduated from the Infantry School, Officers Course in 1921. From 1922 to 1924 he was assistant professor of military science for the Reserve Officer Training Corps program at Johns Hopkins University, from which he received a Bachelor of Science degree in 1924.

Paul was a 1930 graduate of the Infantry Officer Advanced Course, and was an instructor at the U.S. Army Infantry School from 1930 to 1933. He graduated from the U.S. Army Command and General Staff School in 1935, and the U.S. Army War College in 1937.

He was assigned to the staff of the Adjutant General's Department, 1937 to 1941, and in 1942 he received a Master of Arts degree from the American University.

== World War II ==
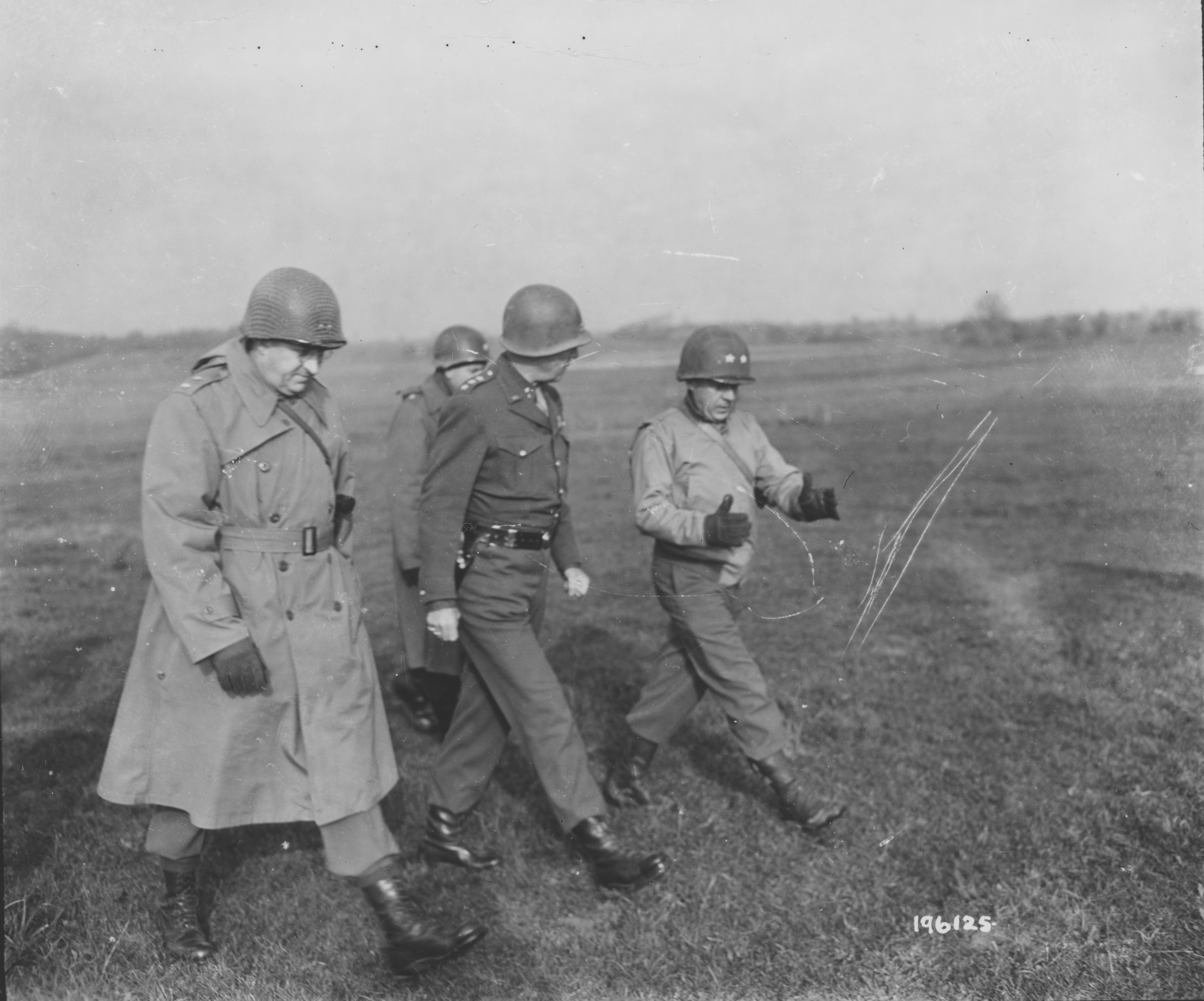
Major General Paul and Lieutenant General Patton, 3 November 1944. To Patton's right is Major General Manton S. Eddy, commanding the XII Corps of Patton's Third Army, under whose command Paul's 26th Division fell.

In 1942, after the American entrance into World War II, Paul was assigned as Deputy Chief of Staff for Logistics, as a G-4 staff officer with Headquarters Army Ground Forces, receiving promotion to the one-star general officer rank of brigadier general on June 24, 1942.

He was promoted again, this time to the two-star rank of major general, on March 16, 1943. The following month he was made the first Commanding General (CG) of the 75th Infantry Division, an all-draftee division, during its stateside training. In August he then assumed command of the 26th Infantry Division, nicknamed the "Yankee Division", an Army National Guard formation recruiting from Massachusetts. He took over command from Major General Roger W. Eckfeldt, who had commanded the 26th Division for over three years. Paul led the 26th in numerous training exercises in the United States and was to command the division for the rest of the war.

In a memoir written by one 26th Division infantryman who trained under his command at Fort Jackson, South Carolina, in 1944, the general "was known as 'Gangplank Paul' to everyone in the ranks for his outspoken eagerness to get his troops overseas. His hortatory speeches on the subject went back years and still stuck in the minds of the earliest YD recruits."

Paul led the 26th Division overseas to the Western Front in late August 1944, arriving at Cherbourg, France in the European Theater of Operations (ETO) in early September 1944, three months after the Normandy landings. The 26th Division's first major action of the war was during the Battle of the Bulge towards the end of the year where it played an important role in the counterattack by Lieutenant General George Patton's Third Army that reduced the German salient. Earning praise from Patton, the 26th took part in the Western Allied invasion of Germany in March 1945 until the end of World War II in Europe in May.

For his services during the war Paul was twice awarded the Army Distinguished Service Medal, the Silver Star, and the Legion of Merit. Interestingly, Paul was also the recipient of four decorations from the Union of Soviet Socialist Republics during World War II - the highest number awarded to an individual U.S. Army servicemember. His decorations included the Order of the Red Banner, the Order of the Patriotic War First Class, the Order of the Red Star and the Bravery Medal.

The citation for his Silver Star reads:

The President of the United States of America, authorized by Act of Congress July 9, 1918, takes pleasure in presenting the Silver Star to Major General Willard Stewart Paul (ASN: 0-5616), United States Army, for gallantry in action as Commanding General of the 26th Infantry Division on 8 November 1944, in France. It was necessary for the 26th Infantry Division to effect a river crossing over the ***** River at *****, France, on 8 November 1944, during the general offensive of the THIRD United States Army in Lorraine, France. The attack of the Division was launched shortly before daylight and by dawn the 101st Infantry Regiment, attacking on the right of the Division, had over-run the local defenses of the town of *****, capturing the large bridge intact. Information was received that the advance of the 101st Infantry Regiment was slowed down due to the fact that the bridge was commanded by direct fire from enemy 88-mm. guns. Major General Paul immediately proceeded to the bridge site, using a road which was under enemy observed fire. Upon finding that the bridge was intact, but was under German observation from the hills across the river from which direct fire was being placed upon the personnel exposing themselves at the bridge, General Paul inspired his troops to infiltrate across the bridge without undue casualties. Having accomplished this he then returned across the open area, the vehicle in which he was riding being the target for at least six well-aimed shots from high-velocity weapons. With the information obtained by General Paul as to the locations of the hostile artillery the Division Artillery was enable to silence these enemy weapons effectively. The presence of General Paul at this most critical and dangerous undertaking resulted in the successful river crossing along the entire front of his division which was reflected in the capture of over 600 prisoners and an advance of over two miles into the hostile position. Major General Paul's inspiring leadership, disregard for personal safety, and loyal devotion to duty are in keeping with the highest traditions of the Armed Forces of the United States.

== Postwar ==
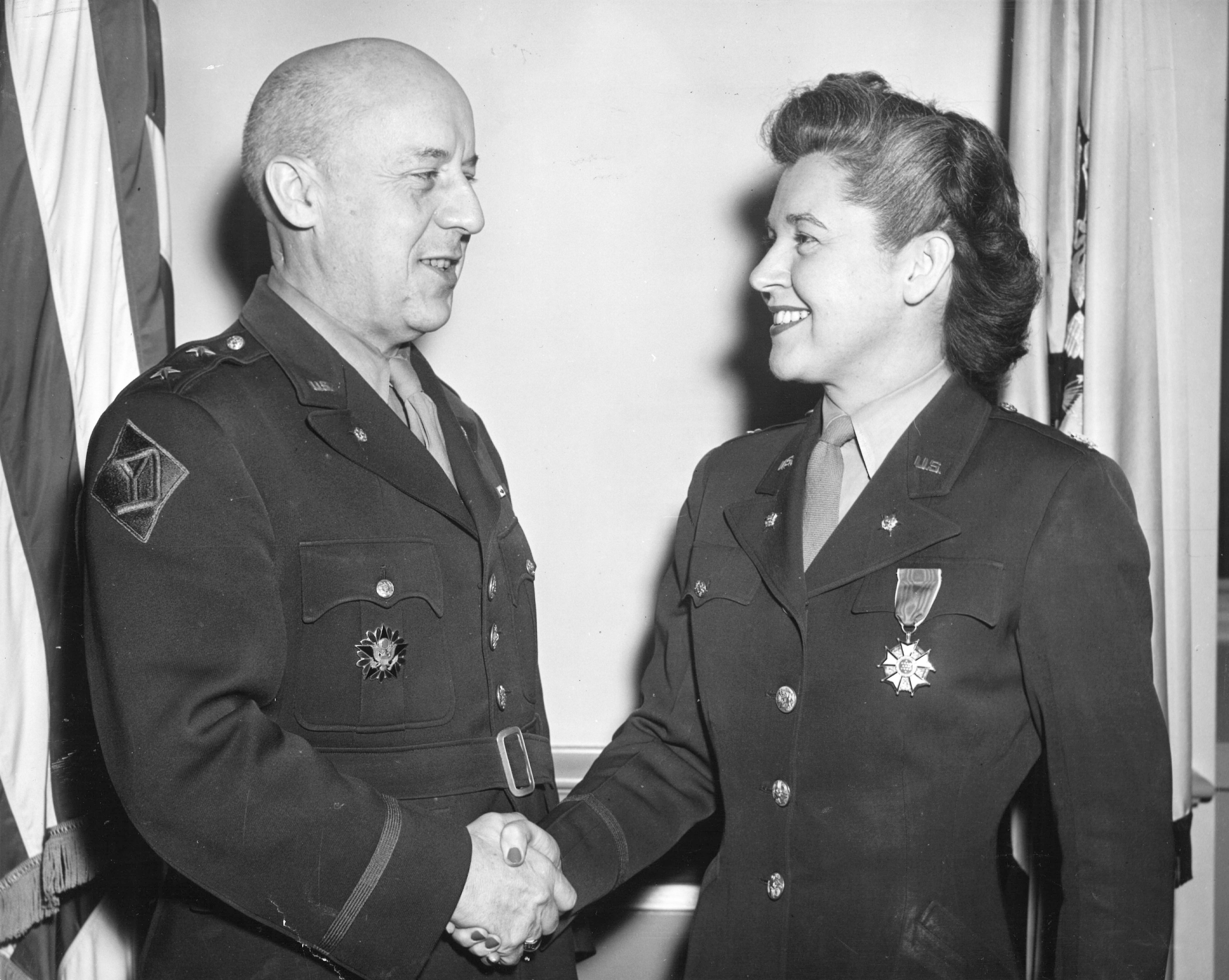
Lieutenant Colonel Mary Louise Milligan receives the Legion of Merit from Major General Willard S. Paul, then the Director of Personnel and Administration, 1946.

After the war Paul remained in Europe as Deputy Chief of Staff for Personnel, G-1, at Supreme Headquarters Allied Expeditionary Force (SHAEF).

In 1947 Paul was promoted to lieutenant general and returned to the United States as the army's Assistant Chief of Staff for Personnel, G-1, where served until his 1948 retirement. As the army's top personnel officer, he was responsible for its post-war manpower demobilization.

Paul's decorations included two awards of the Army Distinguished Service Medal and the Legion of Merit.

== Civilian career ==
Following his retirement from the military he was a consultant for the American Red Cross, assistant director of the Office of Defense Mobilization, and a member of the subcommittee set up by the Hoover Commission to study personnel issues in the Department of Defense. Paul also served as President of the Retired Officers Association.

In 1956 he became President of Gettysburg College, where he remained until his 1961 retirement. One of his acts as President of the college was to make space available for former President Dwight D. Eisenhower to maintain an office.

== Retirement and death ==
Lieutenant General Willard Paul died at Walter Reed Army Hospital on March 21, 1966, and was buried in Section 30, Grave 1073 RH of Arlington National Cemetery, Virginia.

Military offices
Preceded by Newly activated organization	Commanding General 75th Infantry Division; April−August 1943	Succeeded by Fay B. Prickett
Preceded by Roger W. Eckfeldt	Commanding General 26th Infantry Division; 1943–1945	Succeeded by Harlan N. Hartness
