= Fifteenth United States Army =

Field army of the United States

- Shoulder sleeve insignia
- Active: 21 August 1944–31 January 1946
- Country: United States of America
- Branch: United States Army
- Role: Headquarters
- Size: Field army
- Battles: World War II; Rhineland Campaign

Commanders
- Notable commanders: General George S. Patton

Insignia
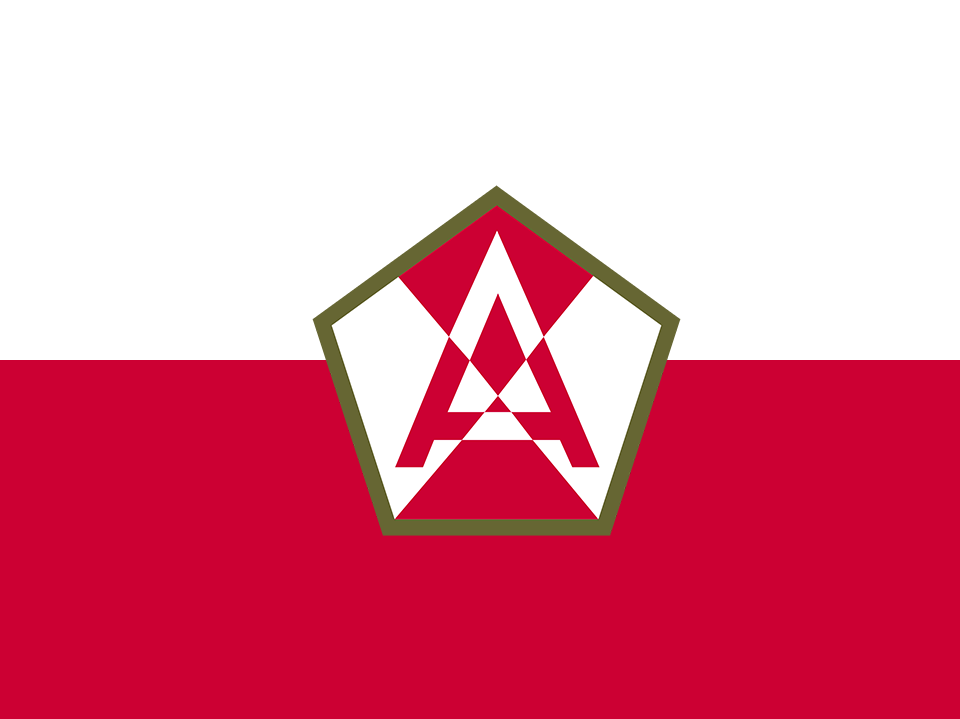
- Flag of the Fifteenth US Army

The Fifteenth United States Army, commonly known as Fifteenth Army, was a field army of the United States in the European Theater of World War II. It was the last United States field army to see service in northwestern Europe during the war and was commanded by General George S. Patton until his death in December 1945. The Fifteenth Army served two separate missions while assigned to the area. During the later stages of the war its mission was the training and rehabilitation of units and acting as a defensive line against counterattacks. After World War II its mission was to carry out occupation duties and to gather historical information related to the European Theater of Operations. Fifteenth Army was inactivated at Bad Nauheim, Germany, in 1946.

== Formation ==
Fifteenth Army was first activated 21 August 1944 at Fort Sam Houston, Texas, by a transfer of a group of personnel from the Fourth United States Army. No general officer was included in the transfer. Major General John P. Lucas was commanding general designate of the new Fifteenth Army in addition to his other duties. Headquarters, Fifteenth Army was then assigned to the Fourth Army.

On 18 October 1944 an advanced detachment was directed to report to the New York Port of Embarkation. From 2 November 1944 until 2 January 1945 at such time as Fifteenth Army left Ft. Sam Houston, Texas, bound for movement overseas, Colonel Louis Compton was designated commander of Fifteenth Army. From New York, on 3 November, they sailed bound for Greenock, Scotland on the Queen Mary, arriving 10 November 1944. The detachment proceeded to an estate called Doddington Hall in Cheshire, England, where they were billeted with XXII Corps which later came under operational control of Fifteenth Army.

The main body of the Fifteenth Army sailed from New York aboard the Aquitania on 15 November 1944 and dropped anchor in the Firth of Clyde off Gourock, Scotland on 22 November. On 24 November, the temporary Fifteenth Army Headquarters began operations at Doddington Hall.

On 25 November 1944 orders were given to place Fifteenth Army under 12th Army Group. Organization continued with a command post established at Chateau d'Ardennes although the main components of the Fifteenth remained in England. As the German offensive now known as the Battle of the Bulge began, the CP was in danger and the headquarters evacuated to Cerfontaine, Belgium. The headquarters moved again on 24 December 1944 to Ferme de Suippes in France.

On 25 December 1944 the main body left Doddington Hall for a staging area in Southampton, England and boarded the British landing ship Empire Javelin the next afternoon. The Fifteenth Army headquarters consisted of 208 officers and 624 enlisted men. An additional 652 men plus the British crew were on board. Crossing the English Channel a few days later, on 28 December 1944, an explosion rocked the ship, possibly from a mine. A French frigate, L'Escarmouche, and some smaller vessels came to the rescue. L'Escarmouche was attached to the side of the Empire Javelin and many of the men jumped from the deck of the Empire Javelin to L'Escarmouche. Some men were rescued from life rafts and one life boat and some were pulled out of the water. About 10 minutes after a second explosion, the Empire Javelin sank at about 5:25 pm. Thirteen men were missing in action and 20 men were injured in this incident.

== European Theater of Operations ==
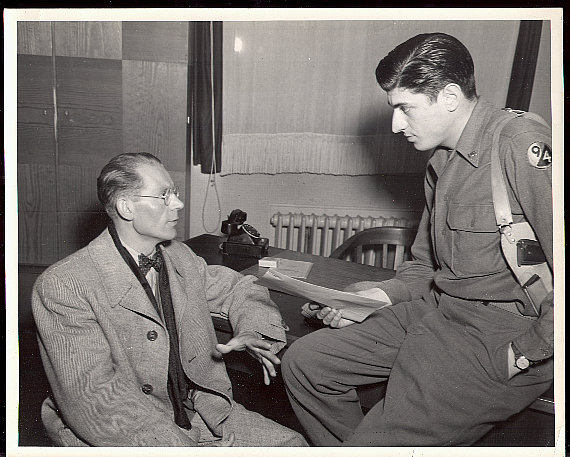
A non-commissioned agent of the Counterintelligence Corps, 94th Infantry Division, Fifteenth Army, interviews a person of interest at Düsseldorf in April 1945.

Major General Ray E. Porter assumed command of the Fifteenth Army on 2 January 1945. No staff accompanied him and he directed the Acting Chief of Staff, Colonel Donegan, to retain his duties. The next day General Porter called together all section chiefs of the Fifteenth and outlined the mission of the Fifteenth and explained its assignment to Twelfth Army Group and SHAEF.

On 16 January 1945 Lieutenant General Leonard T. Gerow assumed command of the Fifteenth Army.

From mid-January 1945 until March, Fifteenth Army was charged with rehabilitating, re-equipping and training various units of the 12th Army Group that had suffered heavy losses during the Ardennes campaign. It processed all new units which arrived at northern European ports through the staging areas until their 12th Army Group assignment.

General Eisenhower assigned the Fifteenth Army to Twelfth Army Group to hold the Ruhr Pocket along the Rhine. Ninth Army and First Army were to pressure the German defenders from the north, east, and south. Eighteen days later, the First and Ninth armies met at Paderborn, with Fifteenth holding the western side of the encirclement.

On 15 March 1945 the Fifteenth Army assumed command of the forces that were bottling up the German forces left behind in the French Atlantic ports. Fifteenth Army also turned east and assumed a defensive position (using XXII Corps) on the west bank of the Rhine from Bonn moving northeast toward Hamburg.

Fifteenth Army never entered the main line of battle. However, its formations did see some action, when it contained and then reduced the enormous Ruhr Pocket from the west during April 1945 in conjunction with elements of Ninth Army. This resulted in the capture of 325,000 German prisoners. Fifteenth Army would take over occupation duties in the region as Ninth Army and First Army pushed farther into Germany.

In April 1945 the Fifteenth Army crossed the Rhine, 2–3 weeks behind the other Allied Field Armies. It took over responsibility for the Hesse, Saarland, Pfalz, and Rhine provinces, where it processed Axis POWs, Disarmed Enemy Forces and Displaced Persons.

After V-E Day, Fifteenth Army's task was to organize the Theater General Board whose purpose was to study, analyze and document past operations in the European Theater. Some intelligence gathering interviews were also conducted by divisions of the Fifteenth Army.

== Military occupation of Germany ==
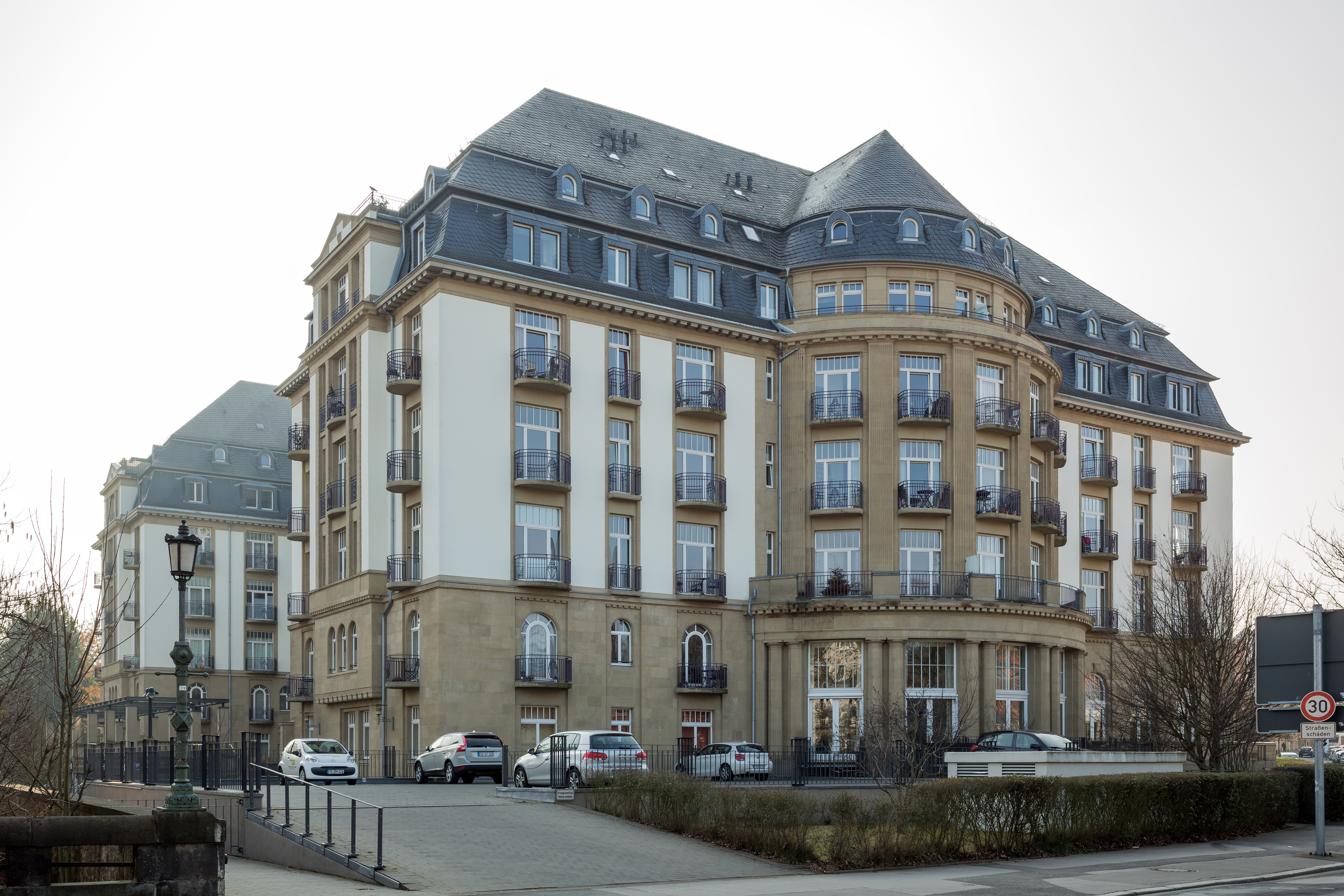
Fifteenth Army headquarters at Bad Nauheim, formerly The Grand Hotel.

The Fifteenth Army was originally intended to command occupation forces in the Rhine Province, Saarland, Palatinate (Pfalz), and part of Hesse, areas now primarily parts of the German states of North Rhine-Westphalia, the Rhineland-Palatinate and Saarland. However, in the summer of 1945, the occupation mission in this sector was assumed in the north by the British Army and in the south by the French Army.

Subsequently, the Fifteenth Army consisted solely of a small staff quartered at Bad Nauheim in the interior of Germany. It consisted of a headquarters and special troops assigned to gather historical data on Allied operations during the war. The Fifteenth Army was headquartered at Bad Neuenahr (within walking distance to Ahrweiler) beginning in late May 1945, according to the diary of one of the soldiers. The men would walk to Ahrweiler during their free time.

During the Occupation, on 2 May 1945 the Fifteenth Army received for safekeeping the Holy Crown of St. Stephen of Hungary. It was transferred for storage at Fort Knox, Kentucky and returned to the Hungarian Government 5 January 1978.

General Gerow remained in command of Fifteenth Army until he was succeeded by General George S. Patton who was appointed Commander, Fifteenth United States Army, and President of the European Theater General Board on 14 October 1945. This appointment was a transfer from Third United States Army. The move took away much of the power Patton had in Bavaria in post-War Germany while attempting to maintain some respect for his accomplishments in the war. By this point the Fifteenth was a small organization concerned with documentation of tactical lessons to be learned from the war. Patton was unhappy with the transfer from Third Army but told friends the transfer was in line with what was his favorite mental occupation since he was seven years old: the study of war.

Coincidentally, 1st Lieutenant John Eisenhower, son of General Dwight D. Eisenhower, had only recently (September, 1945) been assigned to Fifteenth Army. In his book General Ike: A Personal Reminiscence he writes that one day in October 1945 'Ike' told him I had to fire George Patton today. John Eisenhower then served under Patton for a short time.

== Death of Patton ==
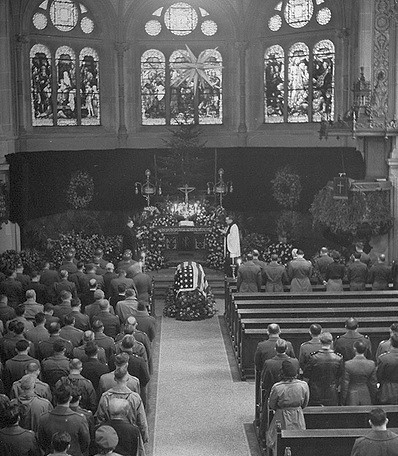
Funeral of General George S. Patton at Christuskirche, Heidelberg, December 1945.

Continuing as commander of Fifteenth Army, in November 1945 Patton replaced General Eisenhower as commander of U.S. Forces in Europe when Eisenhower was reassigned as Army Chief of Staff. Patton was very conflicted during this time, and even considered resigning from the Army (instead of retiring, which would have left him still subject to Army regulations). Saying that a hunting trip might be a good outing to take his mind off his present difficulties, he set out by car on 9 December to go pheasant hunting. On the way General Patton's staff car was involved in a collision and he died from his injuries on 21 December.

Major General Hobart R. Gay became commander of the Fifteenth Army in January 1946. Gay had been Chief of Staff of Third U.S. Army from February 1944 to October 1945, and then Chief of Staff of Fifteenth Army. He remained commander of Fifteenth Army for only about a month, becoming commander of the 1st Armored Division in February 1946.

== Inactivation ==
Headquarters and Headquarters Company, Fifteenth Army, was inactivated on 31 January 1946, at Bad Nauheim, Germany.

== Subordinate units ==
- XVIII Airborne Corps (21 January 1945 to June 1945)
- XXII Corps (21 January 1945 to 20 January 1946)
- XXIII Corps (21 January 1945 to 31 January 1946)
- 13th Armored Division (from 21 January 1945 to 30 March 1945)
- 20th Armored Division (from 29 January 1945 to 11 April 1945)
- 28th Infantry Division (from 10 April 1945 to VE Day)
- 54th Anti-Aircraft Artillery Brigade
- 55th Anti-Aircraft Artillery Brigade
- 66th Infantry Division (from 31 March to 1 June 1945)
- 82d Airborne Division, XXII Corps (from 31 March 1945 to 29 April 1945)
- 86th Infantry Division (from 30 January 1945 to 5 April 1945)
- 94th Infantry Division, XXII Corps (from 29 March 1945 to 14 June 1945)
- 95th Infantry Division, XXII Corps (from 31 March 1945 to 1 April 1945)
- 97th Chemical Mortar Battalion
- 106th Infantry Division (from 10 March 1945; after 15 April 1945 remained in Fifteenth Army attached to ADSEC)
- 294th Field Artillery Observation Battalion
- 315th Counter Intelligence Corps Detachment
- 332d Engineer General Service Regiment
- 351st Field Artillery Battalion (from 21 December 1944 to 7 April 1945)
- 606th Engineer Camouflage Battalion (from 29 January 1945)
- 508th Military Police Battalion (from January 1945)
- 569th Field Artillery Battalion (from 30 April to 15 June 1945)
- 1282d Engineer Construction Battalion
- 1268th Engineer Combat Battalion
- 1700th Engineer Combat Battalion (from February 1945)

(list is incomplete)

== Commanders ==
- Major General John P. Lucas, 14 August 1944 – 15 October 1944
- Lieutenant General Lucian K. Truscott, 15 October 1944 – 3 December 1944
- Colonel Louis Compton, 15 December 1944 – 2 January 1945
- Major General Ray E. Porter, 8 January 1945 – 16 January 1945
- Lieutenant General Leonard T. Gerow, 16 January 1945 – 21 October 1945
- General George S. Patton, 21 October 1945 – 21 December 1945 (incapacitated from 8 December until his death on 21 December)
- Major General Hobart Gay, 21 December 1945 – 31 January 1946
