= 66th Corps =

LXVI Corps or 66th Corps may refer to:

- 66th Corps (China)
- 66th Corps (German Empire)
- LXVI Army Corps, Wehrmacht, Germany
- 66th Rifle Corps, Soviet Union
- 66th (Eastern Rifle Rangers) Lanarkshire Rifle Volunteer Corps, United Kingdom
- 66th (Liverpool Borough Guard) Lancashire Rifle Volunteer Corps, United Kingdom

== See also ==
- List of military corps by number
- 66th Brigade (disambiguation)
- 66th Division (disambiguation)
- 66th Regiment (disambiguation)
- 66th (disambiguation)
