= 66th Cavalry =

66th Cavalry may refer to:

- 66th Cavalry Division (Soviet Union), a Soviet division
- 66th Cavalry Division (United States)
- 66th (Yorkshire) Company, Imperial Yeomanry

== See also ==
- 66th Division (disambiguation)
- 66th Brigade (disambiguation)
- 66th Regiment (disambiguation)
- 66th (disambiguation)
