= 066 =

066 may refer to:

- Air France Flight 066
- Uncial 066
- 0-6-6 type of locomotive

== See also ==
- 66 (disambiguation)
