= 66th Infantry Regiment =

66th Infantry Regiment may refer to:

- 66th Infantry Regiment (Imperial Japanese Army)
- 66th Infantry Regiment (United States)

== See also ==
- 66th Regiment (disambiguation), including American Civil War regiments
