= Vernon Evans =

Vernon Evans may refer to:

- Vernon Evans (general) (1893–1987), officer in the U.S. Army
- Vernon W. Evans (1895–1975), Massachusetts politician and educator
- Vernon Lee Evans (born 1949), Maryland murderer
