= Willard G. Wyman =

United States Army general (1898–1969)

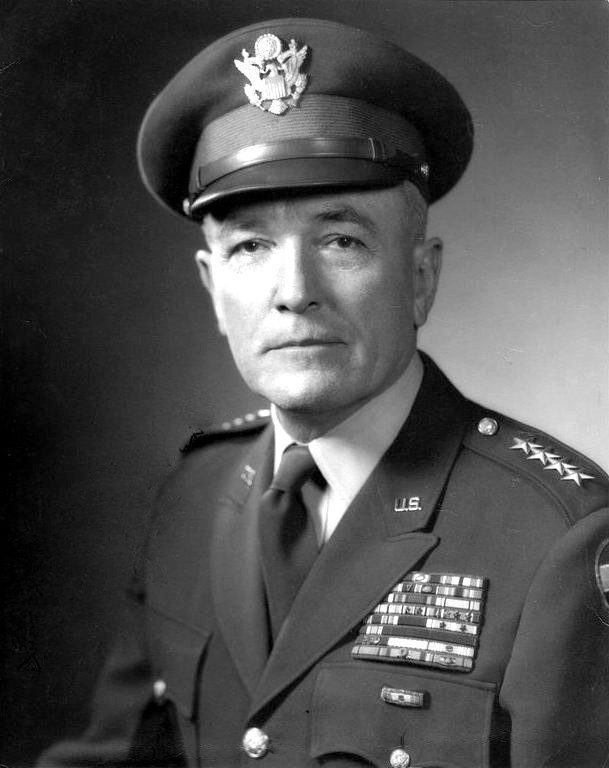
- Wyman as the commander of Continental Army Command c. 1956–1958
- Born: 21 March 1898; Augusta, Maine, United States
- Died: 29 March 1969 (aged 71); Washington, D.C., United States
- Burial place: Arlington National Cemetery, Virginia,
- Military career
- Allegiance: United States
- Branch: United States Army
- Service years: 1918–1958
- Rank: General
- Service number: 0-12356
- Unit: Cavalry Branch
- Commands: Continental Army Command; Sixth United States Army; Allied Land Forces South-Eastern Europe; IX Corps; 71st Infantry Division
- Conflicts: World War I World War II; Korean War
- Awards: Distinguished Service Cross; Army Distinguished Service Medal (3); Silver Star; Legion of Merit; Bronze Star Medal

General Willard Gordon Wyman (21 March 1898 – 29 March 1969) was a senior United States Army officer who served as Commanding General of Continental Army Command from 1956 to 1958.

== Military career ==
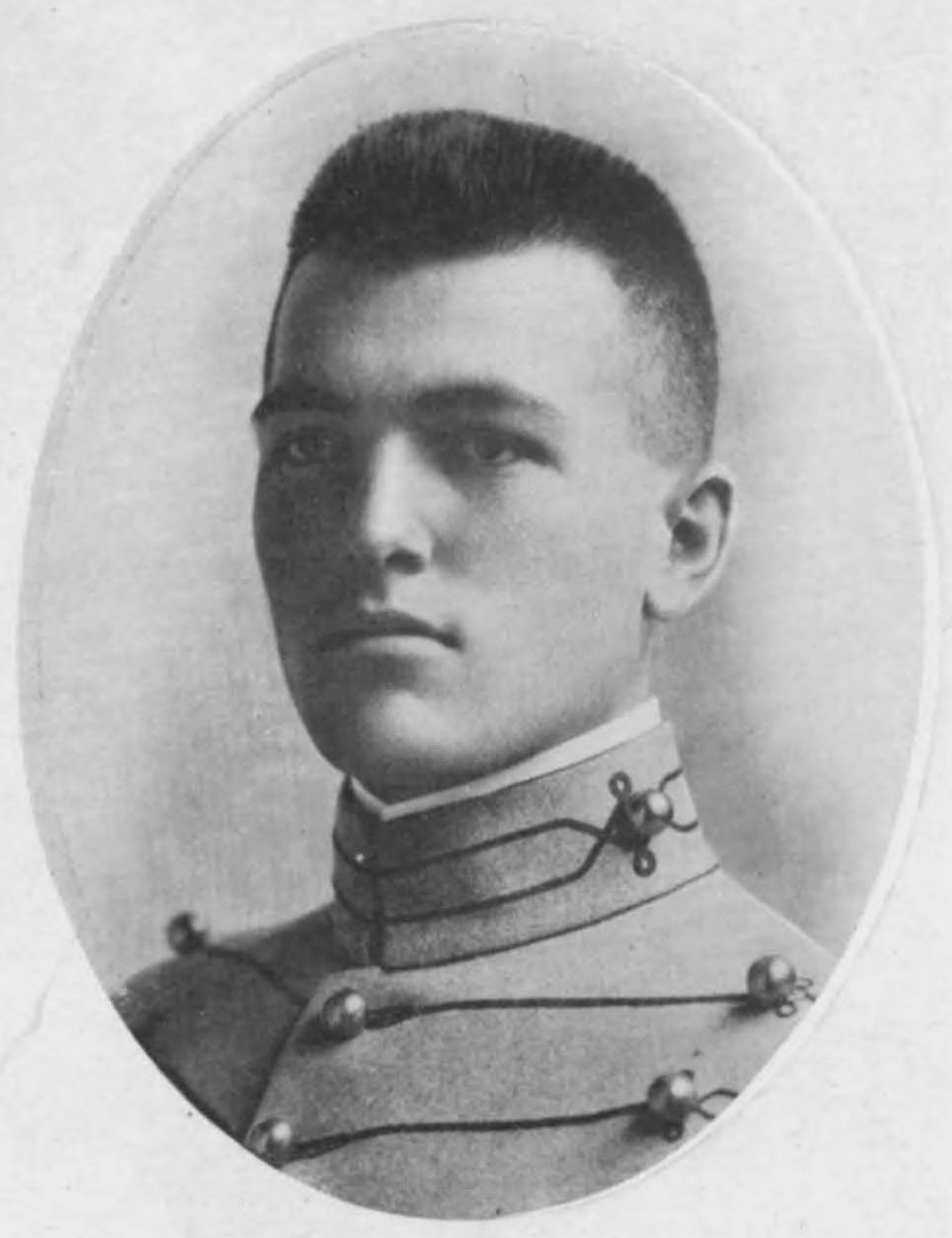
As a West Point cadet

Wyman was born in Augusta, Maine. He entered the United States Military Academy in 1917, after the American entry into World War I, and was commissioned as a second lieutenant into the Coastal Artillery Branch, and later transferred to the Cavalry Branch of the United States Army. He attended the United States Army Cavalry School, the United States Army Signal School at Fort Gordon and the United States Army Command and General Staff College. He later served as an instructor at the U.S. Army Cavalry School and on the General Staff of the War Department.

During World War II Wyman served as the Assistant Chief of Staff of IX Corps, and later in 1942 as Deputy Chief of Staff of the China-Burma-India Theater of Operations. From 1942 to 1943 Deputy Chief of Staff Allied Forces Headquarters (AFHQ) before being assigned as Assistant Division Commander (ADC) of the 1st Infantry Division, which took part in the Normandy landings on 6 June 1944, and the subsequent Battle of Normandy that followed. He took command of the 71st Infantry Division from late 1944 to 1945.

During the Korean War Wyman commanded the IX Corps, and after that assignment served as Commander in Chief, Allied Land Forces South-Eastern Europe (NATO) from 1952 to 1954, followed by command of Sixth United States Army from 1954 to 1955. His final assignment was Commander-in-Chief United States Continental Command. He retired from the army in 1958.

== Death and burial ==
Wyman died at Walter Reed Army Medical Center in Washington, D.C., on 29 March 1969, aged 71, and was buried in Arlington National Cemetery. His wife Ethel Megginson Wyman (1896–1986) is buried next to him.

== Awards and decorations ==
Wyman's awards and decorations include the Distinguished Service Cross, the Army Distinguished Service Medal with two oak leaf clusters, the Silver Star, the Legion of Merit, the Bronze Star Medal with "V" device and the Order of the Patriotic War First Class (USSR) which he received when Commanding General, 71st Infantry Division, as the division linked up with Soviet Red Army units at war's end.

Military offices
Preceded by Eugene M. Landrum	Commanding General 71st Infantry Division; 1944–1945	Succeeded by Onslow S. Rolfe
Preceded by William M. Hoge	Commanding General IX Corps; 1951–1952	Succeeded by Joseph P. Cleland
Preceded by Joseph M. Swing	Commanding General Sixth Army; 1954–1955	Succeeded by Robert N. Young
