= Blue Brigade =

Blue Brigade may refer to:

- Blue Brigade, a Swedish brigade in the service of Gustav II Adolph during his campaigns in Germany in the Thirty Years' War
- Blue Brigade, a Swedish Army armored brigade active from 1949 to 1979
- 66th Brigade (People's Republic of China), a fighter aircraft BLUEFOR unit also known as the Blue Brigade
- Finnish 3rd Brigade (Continuation War), also known as the Blue Brigade
