= 66th =

66th is the ordinal form of the number 66. 66th or Sixty-sixth may also refer to:

- A fraction, 1/66, equal to one of 66 equal parts

== Geography ==
- 66th meridian east, a line of longitude
- 66th meridian west, a line of longitude
- 66th parallel north, a circle of latitude
- 66th parallel south, a circle of latitude
- 66th Street

== Military ==
- 66th Army (Soviet Union)
- 66th Division (disambiguation)
- 66th Regiment (disambiguation)

== Other ==
- 66th century
- 66th century BC

== See also ==
- 66 (disambiguation)
