= James M. Burt =

United States Army armour officer

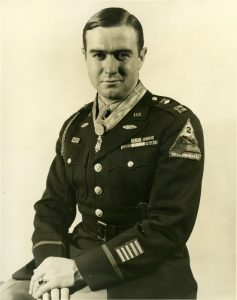
- James Burt in October 1945
- Born: July 18, 1917; Lee, Massachusetts, US
- Died: February 15, 2006 (aged 88); Wyomissing, Pennsylvania, US
- Military career
- Allegiance: United States
- Branch: United States Army
- Service years: 1939 - 1945
- Rank: Captain
- Units: 3rd Battalion, 66th Armor Regiment, 2nd Armored Division
- Conflicts: World War II
- Awards: Medal of Honor

James Montross Burt (July 18, 1917 – February 15, 2006) was a United States Army armor officer who received the Medal of Honor for his valor in the Battle of Aachen during World War II.

== Biography ==
Burt was born in Lee, Massachusetts. He attended Norwich University, where he was a member of Theta Chi fraternity, and graduated in 1939 with a degree in chemistry. Following graduation, Burt was commissioned as a second lieutenant in the Cavalry branch in the Army Reserve, and worked as a chemist in the paper industry.

Burt entered active service in February 1941 and was initially sent to Fort Knox to train as a maintenance officer. He was then assigned to the 66th Armor Regiment, 2nd Armored Division at Fort Benning, Georgia. He served in North Africa, Sicily, and Northern Europe. Promoted to captain, Burt commanded Company B, 66th Armor in near continuous combat from the day the unit landed at the Normandy beachhead in June 1944 through the end of the war.

=== Medal of Honor action ===
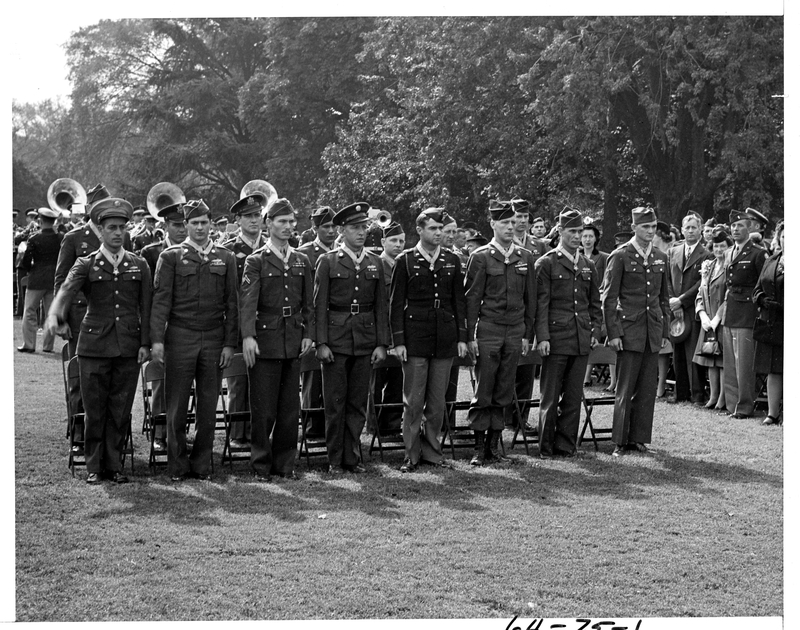
Burt (front row, fifth from left) was one of 15 members of the U.S. Army who received the Medal of Honor from President Harry S. Truman at the White House on October 12, 1945.

Burt received the Medal of Honor for his actions during a 10-day period in October 1944 as the 2nd Armored Division fought to capture Aachen, Germany.

The official citation reads:

Rank and organization: Captain, U.S. Army, Company B, 66th Armored Regiment, 2d Armored Division. Place and date: Near Wurselen, Germany, October 13, 1944. Entered service at: Lee, Mass. Birth: Hinsdale, Mass. G.O. No.: 95, October 30, 1945.

Citation:

Capt. James M. Burt was in command of Company B, 66th Armored Regiment on the western outskirts of Wurselen, Germany, on 13 October 1944, when his organization participated in a coordinated infantry-tank attack destined to isolate the large German garrison which was tenaciously defending the city of Aachen. In the first day's action, when infantrymen ran into murderous small-arms and mortar fire, Capt. Burt dismounted from his tank about 200 yards to the rear and moved forward on foot beyond the infantry positions, where, as the enemy concentrated a tremendous volume of fire upon him, he calmly motioned his tanks into good firing positions. As our attack gained momentum, he climbed aboard his tank and directed the action from the rear deck, exposed to hostile volleys which finally wounded him painfully in the face and neck. He maintained his dangerous post despite pointblank self-propelled gunfire until friendly artillery knocked out these enemy weapons, and then proceeded to the advanced infantry scouts' positions to deploy his tanks for the defense of the gains which had been made. The next day, when the enemy counterattacked, he left cover and went 75 yards through heavy fire to assist the infantry battalion commander who was seriously wounded. For the next 8 days, through rainy, miserable weather and under constant, heavy shelling, Capt. Burt held the combined forces together, dominating and controlling the critical situation through the sheer force of his heroic example. To direct artillery fire, on 15 October, he took his tank 300 yards into the enemy lines, where he dismounted and remained for 1 hour giving accurate data to friendly gunners. Twice more that day he went into enemy territory under deadly fire on reconnaissance. In succeeding days he never faltered in his determination to defeat the strong German forces opposing him. Twice the tank in which he was riding was knocked out by enemy action, and each time he climbed aboard another vehicle and continued the fight. He took great risks to rescue wounded comrades and inflicted prodigious destruction on enemy personnel and materiel even though suffering from the wounds he received in the battle's opening phase. Capt. Burt's intrepidity and disregard of personal safety were so complete that his own men and the infantry who attached themselves to him were inspired to overcome the wretched and extremely hazardous conditions which accompanied one of the most bitter local actions of the war. The victory achieved closed the Aachen gap.

== Post War Life ==
The Third Battalion of the 66th Armored Regiment was nicknamed "Burt's Knights" and eventually James Burt was made the Honorary Colonel of the 66th Armored Regiment.

Burt lived much of his post-war life in New Hampshire and Pennsylvania with his wife Edythe Burt. After a career in the paper industry, he attended Keene State College and received a Master's Degree in Education in 1969. Burt then became a mathematics and business instructor at Franklin Pierce College.

James M. Burt died on February 15, 2006, at the age of 88 in Wyomissing, Pennsylvania.

After his death, his family donated his Uniform and Medal of Honor to Norwich University. They are on display in Jackman Hall.

== See also ==
- List of Medal of Honor recipients
- List of Medal of Honor recipients for World War II
