= 66th Armor Regiment =

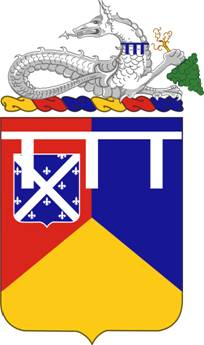
- 66th Armor Regiment coat of arms
- Founded: 1918
- Country: United States
- Branch: United States Army
- Type: Armor
- Role: Armored warfare
- Size: Two battalions
- Garrison/HQ: Fort Carson, CO (1st Battalion); Fort Riley, KS (3rd Battalion)
- Nickname: "Burt's Knights" "Black Knights"
- Motto: Semper in Hostes (Always Into the Enemy)
- Colors: Red, Yellow, and Blue.
- Engagements: World War I World War II; Korean War; Operation Desert Storm; Iraq War
- Decorations: Presidential Unit Citation (3x); Valorous Unit Award (2x); Meritorious Unit Commendation; Superior Unit Award; Presidential Unit Citation (Republic of Korea)

Commanders
- Notable commanders: George S. Patton; James M. Burt

Insignia
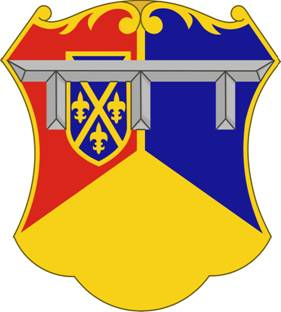
- Distinctive unit insignia

The 66th Armor Regiment is the oldest armored unit in the United States Army, tracing its lineage to the 301st Battalion, Tank Corps, which served with distinction soon after it was formed in the First World War; the 301st trained at Camp Meade, Maryland, where then-Cpt. Dwight D. Eisenhower was an instructor. It has often been rumored that the 301st, the parent unit of the 66th, was first commanded by Col. George S. Patton, but this appears not to have been the case; while Patton was the first officer assigned to the Tank Corps, and while the 301st Tank Battalion was the first unit formed, Patton went nearly immediately to France to train Americans attached to Allied commands. The 301st was the only American heavy tank battalion to have seen action in the war. After the war, the 301st transitioned in the Regular Army to become the 66th Infantry Regiment (Light Tanks) by way of the 16th Tank Battalion.

== Current disposition ==
Two battalions of the regiment are still in service in the Regular Army.

- 1–66 AR is assigned to the 3rd Brigade Combat Team of the 4th Infantry Division at Ft. Carson. The First Battalion has participated in combat operations in Operation Iraqi Freedom and in Operation Enduring Freedom.
- 3–66 AR is assigned to the 1st Brigade Combat Team, 1st Infantry Division (United States), garrisoned at Ft Riley, Kansas. The Third Battalion has participated in combat operations in Operation Iraqi Freedom and in Operation Enduring Freedom. Burt's Knights most recently deployed to Europe in support of Operation Atlantic Resolve and following the Russian invasion of Ukraine, Operation European Assure, Deter, and Reinforce.

== Coat of Arms ==
The 66th Armored Regiment Coat of Arms is described as follows by the United States Army Heraldry unit.

=== Description/Blazon ===
Tierced in pairle reversed Gules, azure and Or; in chief a label of three points Argent. On dexter side an inescutcheon of the second fimbriated, semé-de-lis, overall a saltire all of the last. On a wreath of the three colors a wyvern without wings sinister couchant reguardant Argent, grasping in its dexter claw a pine tree inverted and eradicated Proper. On its neck a label of three points Azure. SEMPER IN HOSTES (Always Into the Enemy).

=== Symbolism ===
The coat of arms was originally approved for the 15th Tank Battalion, part of which was in the old 304th Tank Brigade. Therefore, the shield and crest of the 304th Tank Brigade were used with the label added for difference. The shield is of the colors of the Tank Corps shoulder sleeve insignia. The Brigade was organized at Langres, France, in 1918, so the arms of that place are shown on an inescutcheon differenced by a silver border and by changing the cross from red to silver. The wyvern is from the original insignia of the French Tank Corps. The uprooted pine tree commemorates the activities of this Brigade in the Argonne forest during the Meuse-Argonne operations.

=== Background ===
The coat of arms was originally approved for the 15th Tank Battalion on 12 July 1921. It was reassigned to the 1st Tank Regiment on 10 July 1930 and further reassigned to the 66th Infantry (Light Tanks) on 17 November 1932. The insignia was redesignated for the 66th Armored Regiment on 25 April 1942. It was redesignated for the 66th Medium Tank Battalion of 27 December 1950. The insignia was redesignated for the 66th Armor Regiment on 26 September 1958.

== Distinctive Unit Insignia ==
The 66th Armored Regiment regimental unit insignia is described as follows by the United States Army Heraldry unit.

Description/Blazon
A Gold color metal and enamel device 1 1/8 inches (2.86 cm) in height consisting of a shield blazoned: Tierced in pairle reversed Gules, Azure and Or; in chief a label of three points Argent. On dexter side an inescutcheon of the second fimbriated, semé-de-lis, overall a saltire all of the third.

Symbolism
The coat of arms was originally approved for the 15th Tank Battalion on 12 July 1921. It was reassigned to the 1st Tank Regiment on 10 July 1930 and further reassigned to the 66th Infantry (Light Tanks) on 17 November 1932. The insignia was redesignated for the 66th Armored Regiment on 25 April 1942. It was redesignated for the 66th Medium Tank Battalion of 27 December 1950. The insignia was redesignated for the 66th Armor Regiment on 26 September 1958.

Background
The distinctive unit insignia was originally approved for the 15th Tank Battalion on 11 October 1923. It was reassigned to the 1st Tank Regiment on 11 July 1930 and further reassigned to the 66th Infantry (Light Tanks) on 16 November 1932. The insignia was redesignated for the 66th Armored Regiment on 25 April 1942. It was redesignated for the 66th Medium Tank Battalion of 27 December 1950. The insignia was redesignated for the 66th Armor Regiment on 26 September 1958.

== History ==
=== World War I ===
The 1st and 2nd Light Tank Battalions, which would form the 1st Tank Brigade under LTC. George S. Patton, of the United States Tank Corps would eventually go on to provide the original cadre for what would become the 66th Armored Regiment in World War II. In September 1918 both brigades – which were attached to the 1st Infantry Division in France – participated in the battle of St. Mihiel and the Meuse-Argonne Offensive, operating French-built Renault FT tanks. Five days before the Armistice with Germany, the brigades were renamed respectively the 304th and 305th Brigades, Tank Corps on 6 November 1918.

The casualties in the unit led General John J. Pershing to say: "The percentage of casualties among the officers and men tells the tale of splendid morale and gallantry in action and their unselfish devotion to duty". The regiment's "Organization Day" (this date did not necessarily correlate with the actual organization of the unit) was chosen as 12 September, to commemorate its baptism of fire at St. Mihiel.

=== Interwar period ===
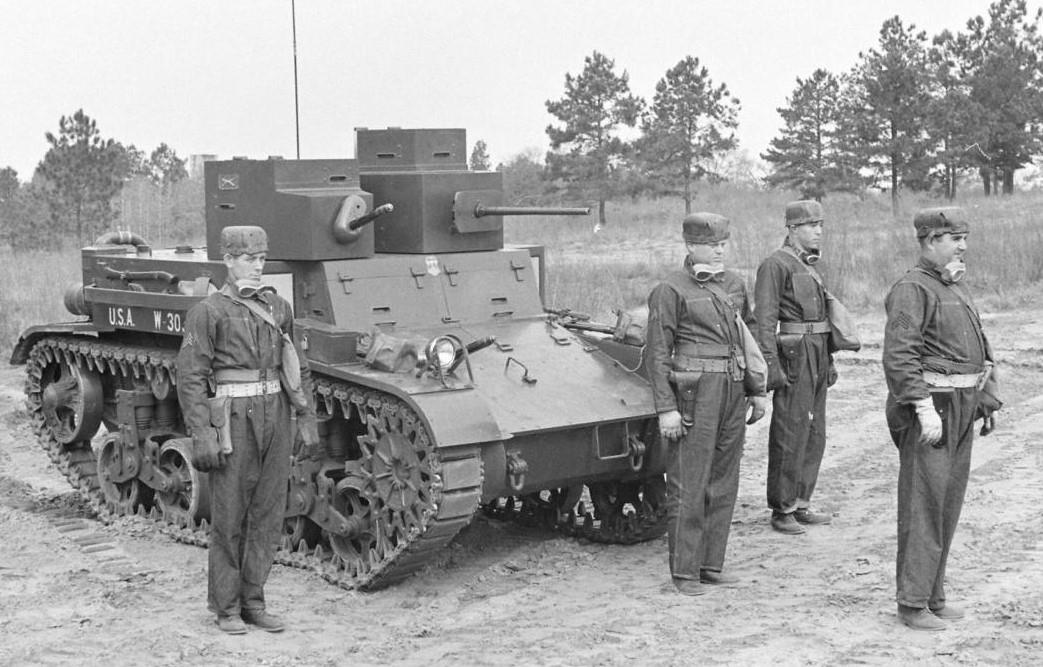
A 66th Infantry (Light Tanks) tank crew stands in front of their M2A3 Light Tank at Ft. Benning, GA in 1938. Note 66th regimental unit crest between driver hatches.

The Headquarters and Headquarters Company, 304th Brigade, Tank Corps, arrived at the port of New York on 17 March 1919 on the USS Patricia, and was transferred to Camp George G. Meade, Maryland. It was consolidated with the Headquarters and Headquarters Company, 305th Brigade, Tank Corps, on 22 June 1921, and reorganized and redesignated Headquarters and Headquarters Company, 1st Tank Group. It was reorganized and redesignated Headquarters and Headquarters Company, 1st Tank Regiment, on 1 September 1929. The remainder of the regiment was organized as follows: 16th Tank Battalion (Light) redesignated 1st Battalion at Camp George G. Meade; 15th Tank Battalion (Special) redesignated 2nd Battalion at Camp Benning, Georgia; 18th Tank Battalion (Light), inactive, redesignated 3rd Battalion; 21st Tank Maintenance Company redesignated Service Company. The 3rd Battalion was activated on 16 September 1931 at Camp Devens, Massachusetts. The regiment was reorganized and redesignated the 66th Infantry Regiment (Light Tanks) on 25 October 1932. The headquarters and headquarters company was inactivated on 1 September 1938 at Fort George G. Meade, and reactivated 10 January 1940 at Fort Benning.

Assigned Reserve officers, less those with the 2nd Battalion, conducted summer training with active elements of the regiment at Fort George G. Meade; those assigned to the 2nd Battalion trained at Fort Benning. The primary ROTC "feeder" school for new Reserve lieutenants was Western Maryland College. In 1936 and 1937, Bruce Magruder commanded the 66th Infantry Regiment at Camp Meade, Maryland. When the regiment received its first two light tanks, unit members decided to name one for Magruder, and his wife took part in the christening ceremony. The regiment was redesignated the 66th Armored Regiment on 15 July 1940, and assigned to the newly formed 2nd Armored Division, stationed at Fort Benning.

=== World War II ===
In December 1942, the regiment was part of the amphibious invasion of Morocco in North Africa and led the division's entry into Casablanca. The regiment next participated in the invasion of Sicily.

During World War II, tank crews of the 66th Armored Regiment were primarily equipped with the M4 Sherman medium and the M5 Stuart light tanks.

On 10 June 1944 (D+4), the three battalions of the regiment landed on Gold Beach in Normandy. Four days later the regiment (as part of Combat Command A of the 2nd Armored Division) fought through elements of the German 6th Fallschirmjäger Regiment of the 2nd Fallschirmjäger Division and elements of the 17th SS Panzergrenadier Division southwest of Carentan, France at the Battle of Bloody Gulch. Later progress was also initially difficult in combat against elements of the newly arrived 116th Panzer Division and surviving elements of the Panzer Lehr Division. In a difficult battle in the streets of the village of Percy and on surrounding high ground on 30 July, against some of the eight Panthers Generalleutnant Fritz Bayerlein had found and rallied from workshops at neighboring Villebaudon on 28 July, the 3/66th was to lose 13 tanks and was forced to pull out of the city losing another five tanks outside Centry to heavy Nebelwerfer and other mortar fire. On 31 July 3/66th was down to only 24 operational tanks. The regiment fought across France to the German border with the rest of the division and the U.S. First Army.

After the conquest of Aachen, the U.S. Ninth Army was inserted into the Allied lines. 2nd Armored Division along with XIX Corps were reassigned and became the veteran formation of Ninth Army. During the Battle of the Bulge, the 66th Regiment along with the 2nd Armored Division moved 100 miles to the west to meet the spearhead of the German attack, the 2nd Panzer Division, just four miles from the Meuse River. At dawn on Christmas Day, the 66th Regiment began the attack that would halt the German advance. Over the next few days the regiment assisted in the destruction of the 2nd Panzer Division and the capture of Houffalize, Belgium.

On 14 June 1944, just after arriving in France, the regiment was reorganized to align with newer armored division structure. While the regimental designation was retained, companies were formally aligned with battalions. For example, the 1st Battalion no longer had companies A, B, and C, instead now it had Company C (M5 Stuart) and Companies F and I (M4 Sherman). 2nd Battalion received Company A (M5) and kept Companies D and E (M4). 3rd Battalion gained Company B (M5) and maintained Companies G and H (M4). The regiment would fight with this organization for the remainder of the war.

The regiment was twice cited in the Order of the Day of the Belgian Army. Captain James M. Burt, the commander of B Company, 66th Armored Regiment, was awarded the Medal of Honor for his heroism during the Battle of Aachen in October 1944. Captain Burt later served as honorary colonel of the regiment.

=== Unrelated unit designated "66th Infantry Regiment" ===
The 66th Infantry Regiment, a Regular Army infantry regiment constituted on 10 July 1943 and activated on 15 July 1943 with the 71st Infantry Division, does not share a lineal connection with the interwar period unit designated the 66th Infantry Regiment.

=== Cold War ===
Following the war, elements of the 66th and other units of the 2nd Armored Division were selected to occupy the American sector of Berlin and serve as the first American troops to enter the fallen German capital.

During the Korean War, an offspring of the 66th fought under the designation "6th Tank Battalion". During the war, the sixth won seven battle streamers and the Korean Presidential Unit Citation. These honors were awarded to the 66th Armored Regiment when the 6th Tank Battalion was inactivated after the conflict.

Throughout the Cold War, the four battalions of the regiment served in the 2nd Armored Division at Ft. Hood, Texas, and as part of the 2nd Armored Division (Forward) in the Federal Republic of Germany.

=== Desert Storm ===
In 1991, during Operation Desert Storm, the regiment assisted in the liberation of Kuwait and the defeat of the Iraqi army. The 2nd and 3rd battalions of the regiment, stationed in Germany as part of the 2nd Armored Division (Forward), deployed and fought under the operational control of the 1st Infantry Division as part of Task Force 1-41 Infantry. The 4th Battalion, along with the 3d (Phantom) Brigade of the 3rd Infantry Division, was attached to the 1st Armored Division. The 2nd and 3rd battalions served in the Battle of 73 Easting and the Battle of Norfolk. The Phantom Brigade became the 1st Armor's lead brigade for VII Corps' "left hook" to smash the Iraqi Republican Guard divisions. It served in the largest tank battle in American history at the Battle of Medina Ridge.

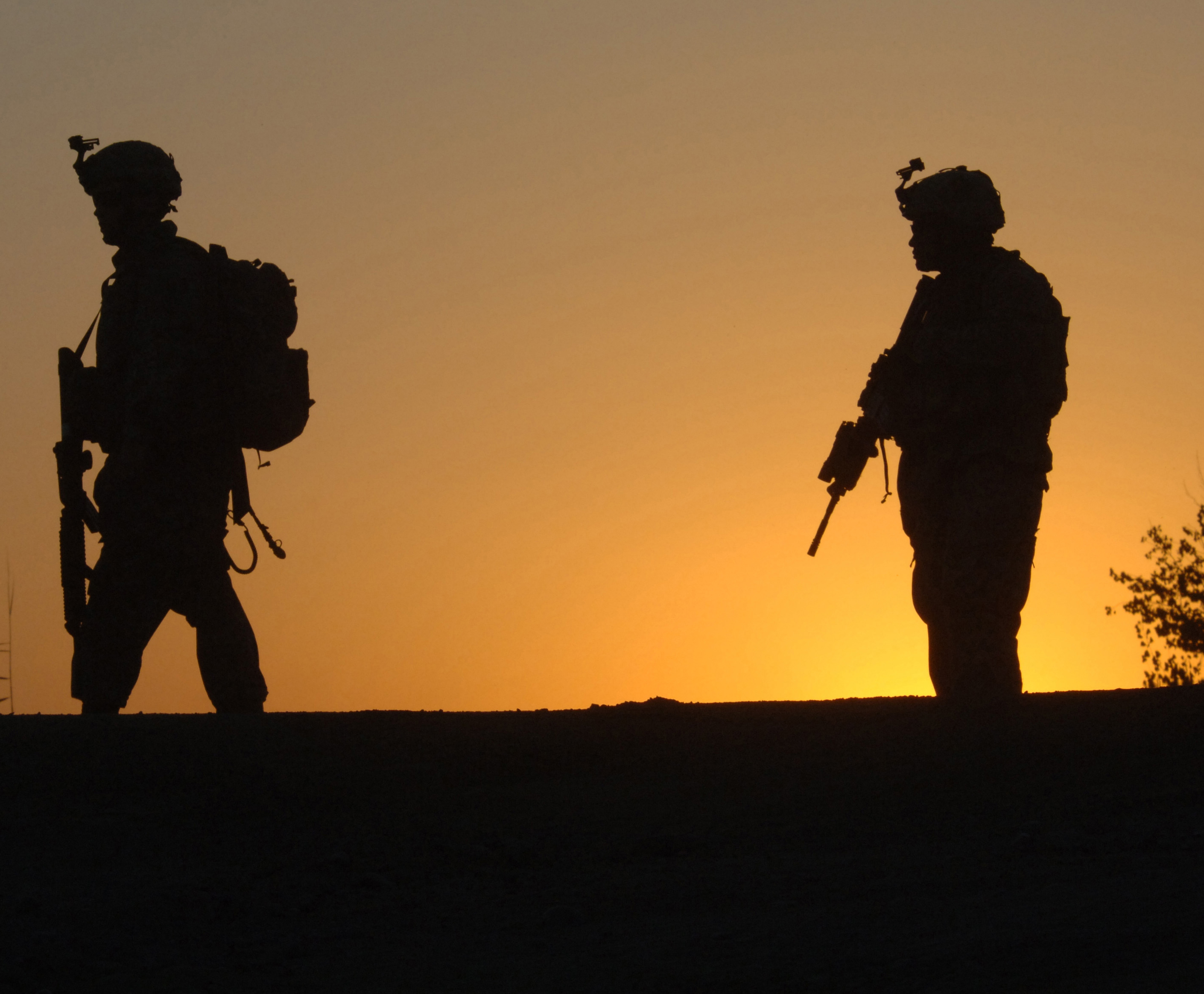
Soldiers from 1st Battalion, 66th Armored Regiment, conduct a cordon and search operation in Sheik Hamid, Iraq.

In the spring of 1995, the 1st Battalion of the 66th was assigned to assist over 5,000 Cuban and Haitian refugees interned at Guantanamo Bay, Cuba.

=== Global War on Terror ===
The 1st and 3rd Battalions deployed to Iraq in support of Operation Iraqi Freedom and Afghanistan in support of Operation Enduring Freedom.

1-66 Armor deployed to Iraq in 2003–2004, 2005–2006, and in 2008–2009; the third deployment to Iraq was the last deployment of 1-66 while stationed at Fort Hood TX, before relocating to Fort Carson, Colorado, and joining the 4th Infantry Division. 1-66 Armor subsequently deployed to Afghanistan in 2010–2011, as part of the Surge in the volatile Arghandab River Valley west of Kandahar City in RC-South.

3-66 Armor deployed to Iraq in 2003-2004 and 2008–2010, and to Afghanistan in 2011–2012 to Paktika Province in RC-East. For its conduct during its second deployment to Iraq, 3-66 Armor was awarded the Army Meritorious Unit Commendation on 10 March 2010.

== Lineage ==
=== World War I ===
- Organized in August 1918 in the American Expeditionary Forces in France as Headquarters and Headquarters Companies, 1st and 2d Provisional Brigades, Tank Corps.
- Redesignated 6 November 1918 as Headquarters and Headquarters Companies, 304th and 305th Brigades, Tank Corps, respectively
- Consolidated and redesignated 22 June 1921 as Headquarters and Headquarters Company, 1st Tank Group
- Reorganized and redesignated 1 September 1929 as Headquarters and Headquarters Company, 1st Tank Regiment; remainder of the 1st Tank Regiment organized from existing units as follows:

16th Tank Battalion reorganized and redesignated as the 1st Battalion, 1st Tank Regiment (16th Tank Battalion organized in 1918 as Headquarters and Headquarters Company, 327th Battalion, Tank Corps, and Company C, 1st Separate Battalion, Heavy Tank Service, 65th Engineers)
15th Tank Battalion reorganized and redesignated as the 2d Battalion, 1st Tank Regiment (15th Tank Battalion organized in 1918 as Headquarters and Headquarters Company, and Companies A and C, 1st Battalion, 1st Tank Center, and Company A, 1st Separate Battalion, Heavy Tank Service, 65th Engineers)
18th Tank Battalion redesignated as the 3d Battalion, 1st Tank Regiment (18th Tank Battalion organized in 1918 as the 329th Battalion, Tank Corps, and Headquarters and Headquarters Company, 328th Battalion, Tank Corps; inactivated 29 July 1922)
21st Tank Maintenance Company redesignated as the Service Company (21st Tank Maintenance Company organized in 1918 as the 316th Repair and Salvage Company, Tank Corps)

- (3d Battalion activated 16 September 1931 at Camp Devens, Massachusetts)
- 1st Tank Regiment converted and redesignated 25 October 1932 as the 66th Infantry (Light Tanks)
- (Headquarters and Headquarters Company, 66th Infantry [Light Tanks] inactivated 1 September 1938 at Fort George G. Meade, Maryland; Headquarters Company activated 16 October 1939 at Fort George G. Meade, Maryland; Headquarters activated 10 January 1940)

=== World War II ===
- Converted and redesignated 15 July 1940 as the 66th Armored Regiment and assigned to the 2d Armored Division
- Regiment broken up 25 March 1946 and its elements reorganized and redesignated as elements of the 2d Armored Division as follows:

Regimental Headquarters and Headquarters Company, 1st Battalion, and Company D as the 66th Tank Battalion
2nd Battalion (less Company D) and Headquarters Company, 3d Battalion, as Headquarters and Headquarters Company, Companies A and B, and Service Company, 6th Tank Battalion (remainder of 6th Tank Battalion organized from elements of the 67th Armored Regiment)
Reconnaissance Company as Troop D, 82d Cavalry Reconnaissance Squadron, Mechanized
Service Company as the Service Company, 12th Armored Infantry Battalion
(Band as the 2d Armored Division Band hereafter – separate lineage)
3d Battalion (less Headquarters Company) and Maintenance Company disbanded

- After 25 March 1946 the above units underwent changes as follows:

66th Tank Battalion redesignated 5 January 1949 as the 66th Medium Tank Battalion Redesignated 1 April 1953 as the 66th Tank Battalion Inactivated (less Company A) 1 July 1957 in Germany and relieved from assignment to the 2d Armored Division
6th Tank Battalion redesignated 31 January 1949 as the 6th Medium Tank Battalion Relieved 14 July 1950 from assignment to the 2d Armored Division Assigned 29 October 1950 to the 24th Infantry Division Redesignated 10 November 1951 as the 6th Tank Battalion Inactivated 5 June 1958 in Korea and relieved from assignment to the 24th Infantry Division
Troop D, 82d Mechanized Cavalry Reconnaissance Squadron, redesignated 17 January 1948 as Company D, 82d Reconnaissance Battalion Inactivated 1 July 1957 in Germany and relieved from assignment to the 2d Armored Division
Service Company, 12th Armored Infantry Battalion, redesignated 11 October 1948 as Company D, 12th Armored Infantry Battalion Inactivated 1 July 1957 in Germany and relieved from assignment to the 2d Armored Division
Maintenance Company and Companies G, H, and I, 66th Armored Regiment, reconstituted 1 July 1957 in the Regular Army

- 6th Tank Battalion (less Companies C and D); 66th Tank Battalion; Company D, 82d Reconnaissance Battalion; Company D, 12th Armored Infantry Battalion; and the Maintenance Company and Companies G, H, I, 66th Armored Regiment, consolidated, reorganized and redesignated 1 July 1957 as the 66th Armor, a parent regiment under the Combat Arms Regimental System (Companies C and D, 6th Tank Battalion reorganized and redesignated as elements of the 67th Armor—hereafter separate lineages)
- Withdrawn 1 October 1983 from the Combat Arms Regimental System and reorganized under the United States Army Regimental System

== Honors ==
=== Campaign participation credit ===
- World War I:
1. St. Mihiel;
2. Meuse-Argonne
- World War II:
1. Algeria-French Morocco (with arrowhead);
2. Sicily (with arrowhead);
3. Normandy;
4. Northern France;
5. Rhineland;
6. Ardennes-Alsace;
7. Central Europe
- Korean War:
1. UN Defensive;
2. UN Offensive;
3. CCF Intervention;
4. First UN Counteroffensive;
5. CCF Spring Offensive;
6. UN Summer-Fall Offensive;
7. Second Korean Winter;
8. Korea, Summer 1953
- Southwest Asia:
1. Defense of Saudi Arabia;
2. Liberation and Defense of Kuwait;
3. Cease-Fire
- Afghanistan Campaign
- Iraqi Campaign

=== Decorations ===
1. Army Presidential Unit Citation for NORMANDY
2. Army Presidential Unit Citation for VIRE RIVER
3. Army Presidential Unit Citation for ROER RIVER
4. Valorous Unit Award for IRAQ-KUWAIT
5. Valorous Unit Award for IRAQ OIF 07-09 New Baghdad
6. Belgian Fourragere 1940
  1. Cited in the Order of the Day of the Belgian Army for action in BELGIUM 1944
  2. Cited in the Order of the Day of the Belgian Army for action in the ARDENNES
7. Army Meritorious Unit Commendation (3rd Battalion) awarded 10 March 2010 for Operation Iraqi Freedom 08-10
8. Army Superior Unit Award Task Force XXI Advanced Warfighting Experiment 1997

== In popular culture ==
- The 66th Armor Regiment's role in the Battle of Bloody Gulch is depicted in the third episode of the HBO mini-series Band of Brothers.
- The tank crew in the 2014 film Fury belong to the 66th Armored Regiment.

== See also ==
- List of armored and cavalry regiments of the United States Army

== Bibliography ==
- American Forces in Action Series; Historical Division; United States Army Center of Military History
1. Omaha Beachhead (6–13 June 1944); CMH Pub 100-11.
2. Utah Beach to Cherbourg (6–27 June 1944); CMH Pub 100-12
3. ST-LO (7–19 July 1944); CMH Pub 100-13
- Other United States Army Center of Military History Publications
1. United States Army in the Korean War; Policy and Direction: The First Year; CMH Pub 20-1-1
2. South to the Naktong, North to the Yalu (June–November 1950) CMH Pub 20-2-1
3. Truce Tent and Fighting Front; CMH Pub 20-3-1
4. Ebb and Flow November 1950-July 1951; CMH pub
- Other Publications
1. Blaker, Gordon A. Iron Knights: The U.S. 66th Armored Regiment in WWII. 1999
2. Barth, George B. Tropic Lightning and Taro leaf in Korea. N.p.: 1953.
3. Blumenson, Martin. Breakout and Pursuit. 1961
4. Cole, Hugh M. The Ardennes: Battle of the Bulge. 1965
5. Harrison, Gordon A. Cross-Channel Attack. 1951
6. Garland, Albert N., and Howard McGaw Smith. Sicily and the Surrender of Italy. 1965
7. Howe, George F. Northwest Africa: Seizing the initiative in the West. 1957
8. MacDonald, Charles B. The Siegfried Line Campaign. 1963
9. Stadtmauer, Saul A.., editor. A Pictorial History of the Victory Division in Korea. Tokyo, Japan: 1953
10. Guderian, Major Heinz Gunther.., From Normandy to the Ruhr: With the 116th Panzer Division.
11. Bayerlein, Generalleutnant Fritz.., After Action Reports of the Panzer Lehr Division Commander: From D-Day to the Ruhr.
