= 301st Battalion, Tank Corps =

Armored battalion of the United States Army during World War I

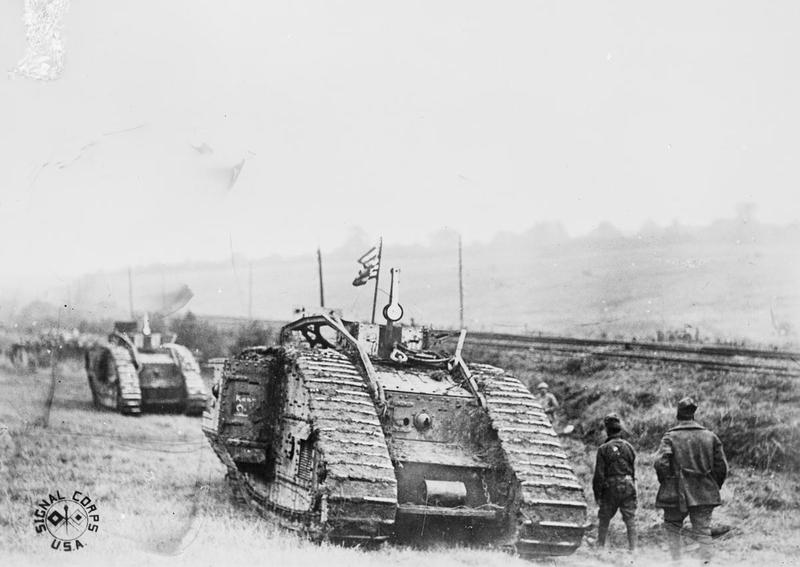
- The 301st Battalion, Tank Corps, going into action at Souplet in 1918. Note "Old Glory" flying from the tank.
- Active: 1918–1921
- Disbanded: June 22, 1921
- Allegiance: United States
- Branch: Army
- Type: Armored
- Size: Battalion
- Part of: American Expeditionary Forces
- Equipment: 47 British Mark V Tanks
- Battles: World War I; Battle of Le Catelet-Bony; Battle of the Selle

Insignia
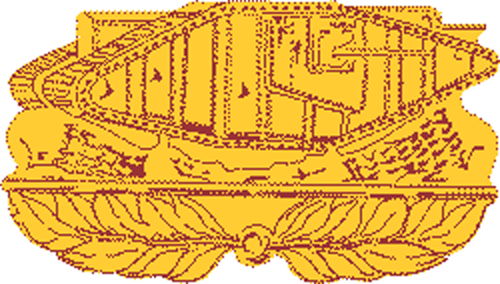
- Branch insignia

The 301st Battalion, Tank Corps, also known as the 301st Heavy Tank Battalion, was an armored formation of the United States Army in the Western Front of World War I. Of the eight heavy battalions, only the 301st saw combat. The battalion was merged during the interwar period into the 66th Infantry Regiment (Light Tanks), later to become the 66th Armor Regiment.

== History ==
=== World War I ===
The 301st went through many name changes being formed as the "1st Separate Tank Battalion, Heavy Tank Service, 65th Engineers." When it arrived at the Tank School in Bovington, UK it was redesignated the "41st Tank Battalion." In June 1918 the AEF changed their naming system and which gave the unit its final name, 301st Heavy Tank Battalion. The British agreed to provide 47 Mark V Tanks to the Americans but only if the unit was attached to the British Fourth Army.

The 301st, equipped with British Mark V tanks, suffered large casualties in the Battle of Le Catelet-Bony on 29 September as part of the British 4th Tank Brigade, under the control of the Australian Corps. Efforts were made to hide the Tanks moving up to the front lines by having Planes fly over German lines. The attack started at 5.50 a.m. in a thick mist. Some tanks were hit by shelling before the start line, while others were lost crossing an unreported British minefield. Of the 34 participating tanks, only 10 reached their objective. Of the crews of the 40 tanks of the 301st Battalion, 112 were casualties. The numbers broke down as three officers and 20 enlisted men were killed, seven officers and 55 enlisted men were severely wounded and eight officers and 15 enlisted men were slightly wounded, and one officer and six enlisted men missing.

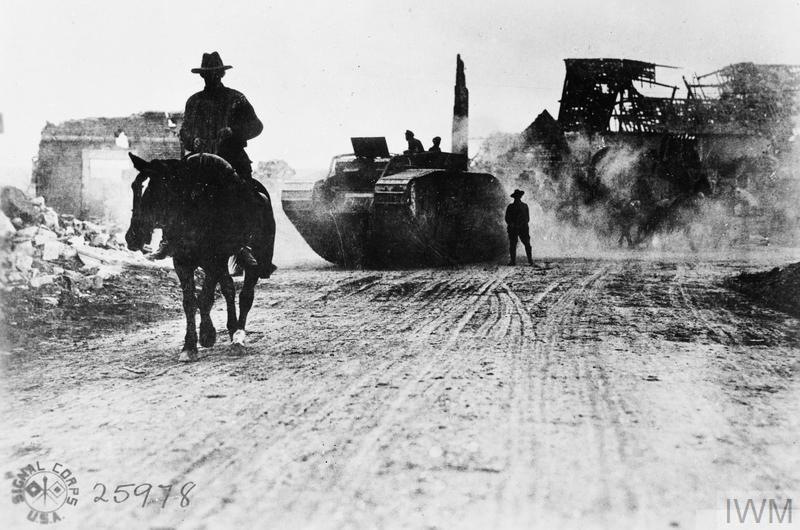
American tank arriving at Bellicourt.

The 301st then seized the village of Brancourt on 8 October, fought in the Battle of the Selle on October 17, 1918. During the fighting, the Tanks were required to cross the Selle River a tributary of the Somme. US planners were able to use low-flying aeroplane reconnaissance to select good shallow crossings and 19 tanks out of the 20 operating successfully crossed the stream.

Their fourth and final battle was the night attack on 22–23 October in the vicinity of the Sambre Canal. Nine Tanks from the 301st were assigned to the 1st British Division on German lines near Bazuel, south-east of Le Cateau. At H-hour, all nine Tanks moved forward rapidly, taking out German strong points. They moved so fast that their supporting infantry had trouble keeping up with them. All Tanks reached their objectives with only five casualties when one of the Tank crews was gassed but was successfully treated.

=== Interwar period ===
Headquarters and Headquarters Company, 304th Tank Brigade, was transferred to Camp Meade, Maryland, and consolidated with HHC, 305th Tank Brigade, on 22 June 1921, reorganized and was redesignated HHC, 1st Tank Group.
