= Tank Corps (United States) =

Armored corps of the United States Army during World War I

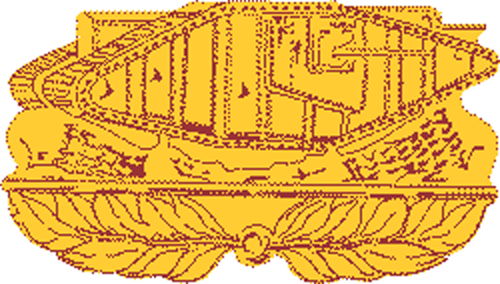
- Insignia of the Tank Corps (Note: Adopted in 1918, the branch insignia depicts the side view of the Mark VIII Tank above two stylized dragons breathing fire over a wreath.)
- Active: 1917–1920
- Disbanded: June 4, 1920
- Allegiance: United States
- Branch: Army
- Type: Armored
- Size: Corps
- Wars: World War I

Commanders
- Chief of Tank Corps: Brig. Gen. Samuel D. Rockenbach

The Tank Corps was the armored corps of the United States Army during World War I.

== History ==
=== World War I ===
==== Regular Army ====
Brigadier General Samuel D. Rockenbach, as the Chief of Tank Corps under General John J. Pershing; organized, trained, equipped and then deployed the first American tank units to the Western Front of 1918 Europe. An initial plan for 2,000 light Renault FT tanks and 200 heavy British Mark VI tanks was changed to 20 battalions of 77 light tanks each and 10 battalions of 45 heavy tanks each.

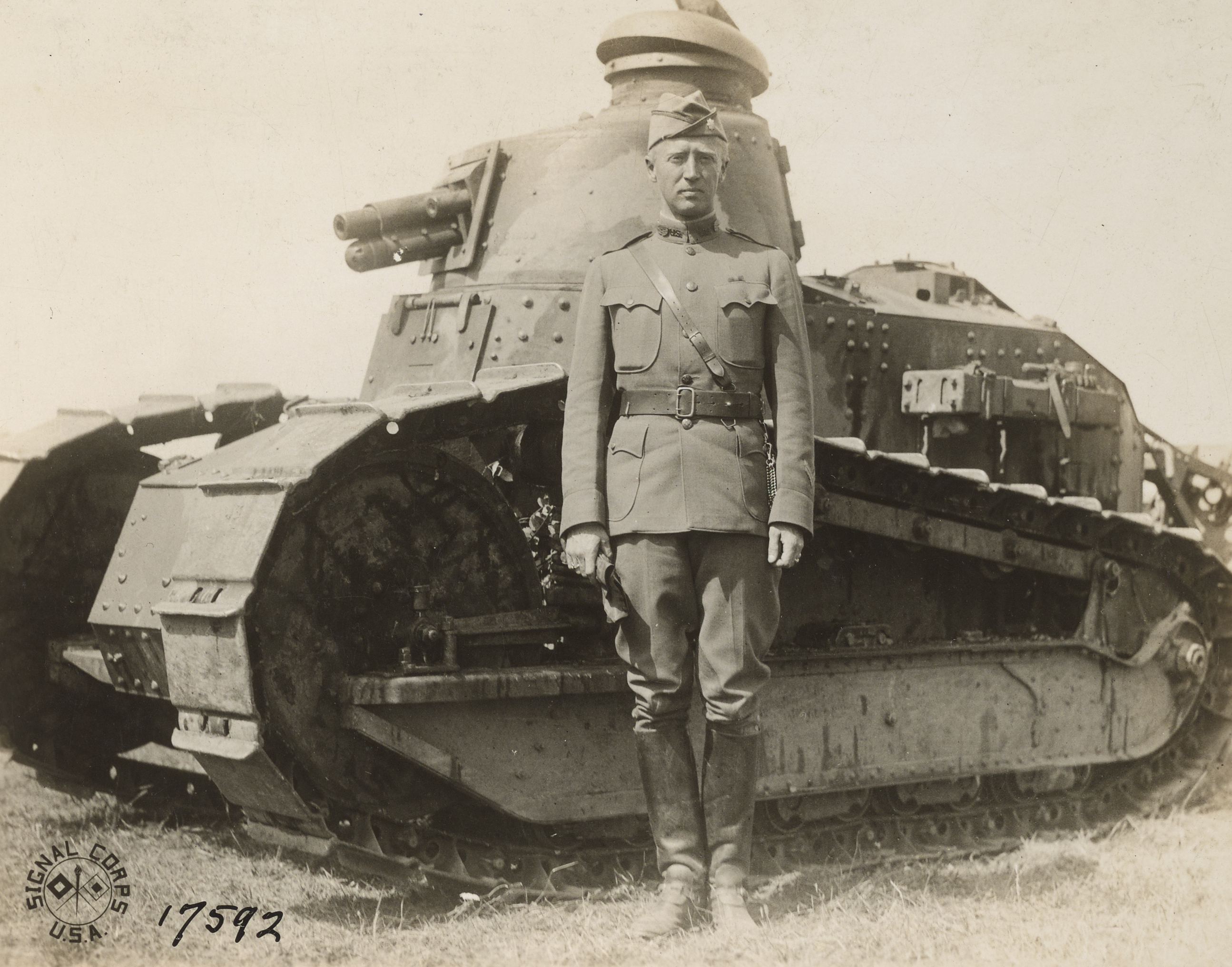
Lieutenant Colonel George S. Patton in July 1918, near Langres, France.

A total of eight heavy battalions (the 301st to 308th) and 21 light battalions (the 326th to 346th) were raised, but only four (the 301st, 331st, 344th and 345th) saw combat. Captain George S. Patton, the first officer assigned to the unit, set up a light tank school at Bourg, France, starting on 10 November 1917. In the first half of 1918, the 326th and 327th Tank Battalions were organized at Patton's school, while the 301st Heavy Tank Battalion was raised at Camp Meade, Maryland, United States, and transported to the British Tank School at Bovington Camp in southern England, for training.

The 326th (under the command of Sereno E. Brett) and 327th Tank Battalions (later renamed the 344th and 345th and organized into the 304th Tank Brigade, commanded by Patton), were the first into combat, beginning with the Battle of Saint-Mihiel as part of the US IV Corps on 12 September 1918. The small French Renault FT tanks they were equipped with found the going hard and many were lost or ran out of fuel crossing the battlefield – the Germans, forewarned, had largely retreated from the salient. The tanks then took part in the Meuse–Argonne offensive as part of the US V Corps on 26 September. Major Brett assumed command of the 304th after Patton was injured on 26 September, the first day of the Meuse-Argonne Offensive near Cheppy, France.

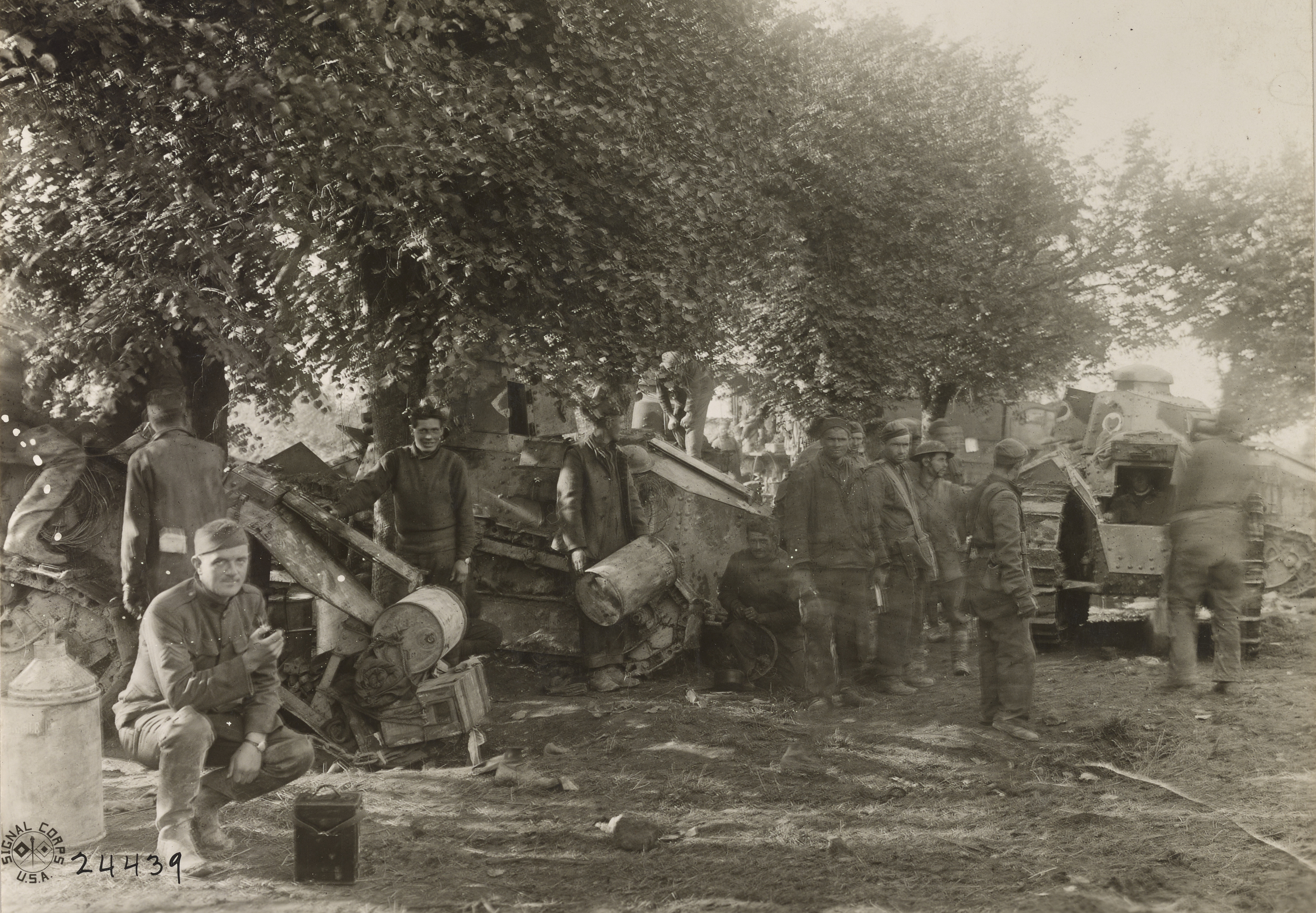
326th Battalion, Tank Corps, in October 1918, Varennes, France.

When the fighting ended on November 11, 1918, the AEF Tank Corps and the units in the United States had about 20,000 men. The AEF Tank Corps was redeployed after the armistice, with the remaining personnel transferred back to the United States. The Tank Corps, which formed part of the National Army, was formally disbanded in 1920, when the National Army was demobilized and consolidated into the Regular Army. After being transferred to Camp Meade, Maryland, the 304th and 305th Tank Brigades were consolidated and redesignated several times, together eventually forming the 1st Tank Regiment on 1 September 1929. This unit was again reorganized and redesignated as the 66th Infantry Regiment (Light Tanks) on 25 October 1932, and remains in active service as of 2024. Now known as the 66th Armor Regiment, it is the oldest armored unit in the modern United States Army.

==== National Army ====
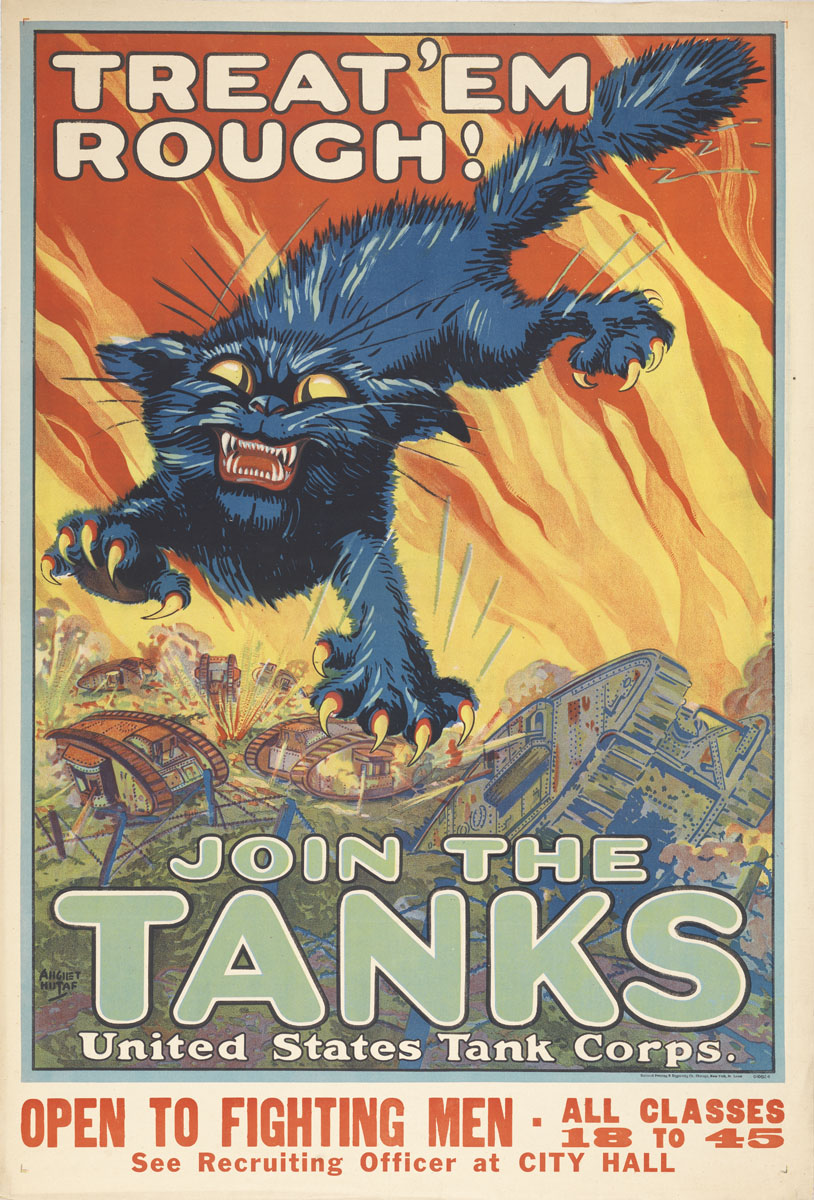
‘Treat ‘Em Rough’, the most famous recruiting poster for the Tank Corps featured its motto and the iconic Black Cat, c. 1917. (Library of Congress)

The Tank Corps, National Army, was the continental United States based armored formation of the army prior to consolidation. Preceded by the Tank Service of the National Army, of February 15, 1918, in the 65th Engineers at Camp Meade, the service was removed from the Corps of Engineers and organized as the Tank Corps, National Army, with command transferring from Colonel H. H. Ferguson on March 9 to Colonel Ira C. Welborn.

On March 6, 1918, a Camp Colt, Pennsylvania, for training tank recruits, was established on the Gettysburg Battlefield at the former "Camp, United States Troops, Gettysburg, Pennsylvania." On July 15, 1918, Col William H Clopton Jr, arrived in the US and subsequently formed the 2nd stateside tank training center at Tobyhanna, Pennsylvania. Approximately 2000 Camp Colt men transferred to Tobyhanna, e.g., the 302nd and 326th Battalions), and Tobyhanna had two tanks and ~2200 men.

Another tank training center was opened at Camp Polk, North Carolina, in September 1918 (a heavy battalion from Camp Colt transferred to "form the nucleus"). At Camp Colt in October the 310th Tank Center was established as were the 338th, 339th, and 346th Tank Battalions (John Montgomery Mahon was the commander of Camp Colt's 310 Brigade Headquarters).

=== Interwar period ===
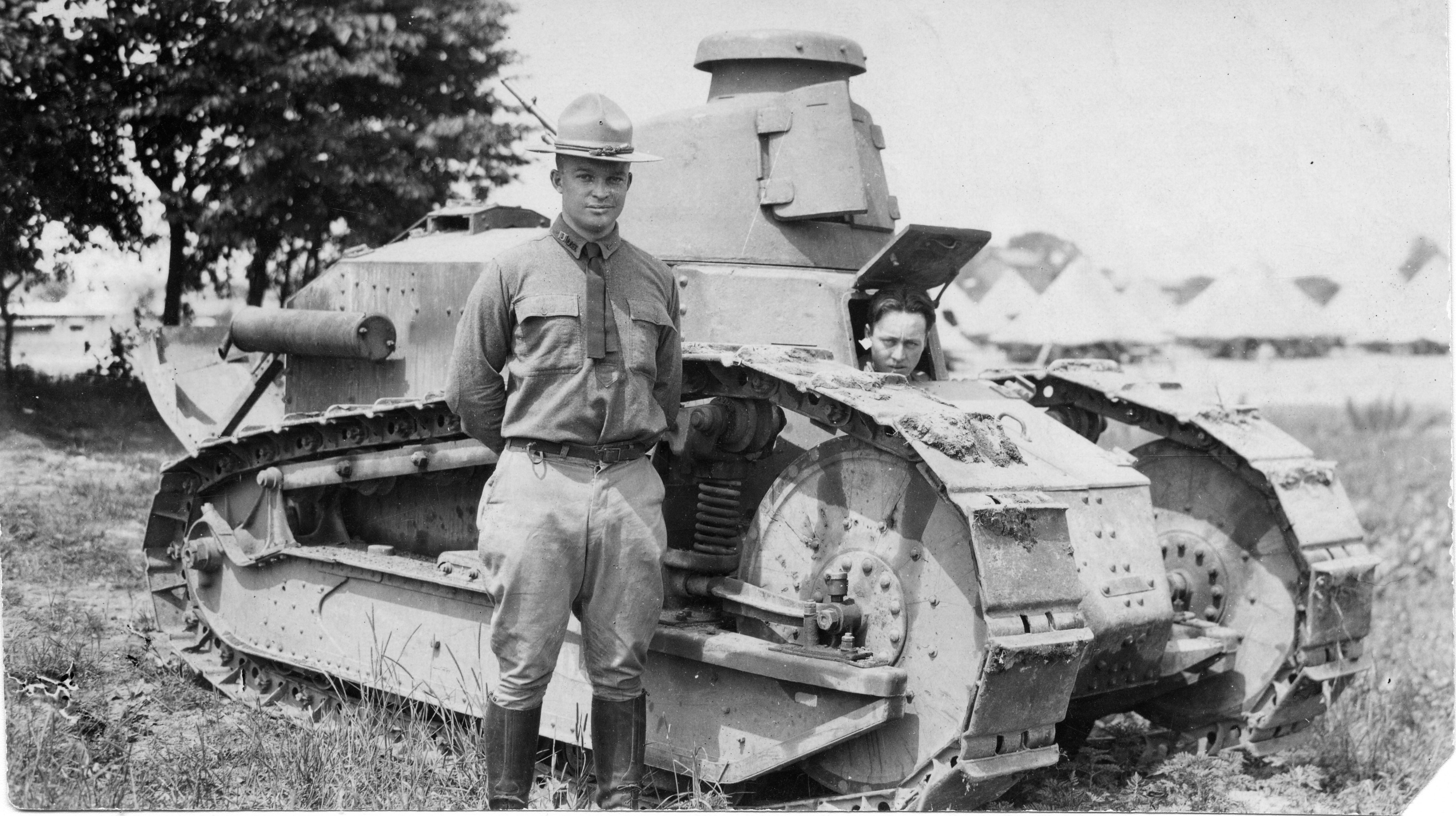
Lieutenant Colonel Dwight D. Eisenhower, future president of the United States, standing in front of a tank at Fort Meade, Maryland, in 1919.

At the time of the Armistice, the Tank Corps had 483 officers and 7700 enlisted men, and the consolidation of tank training had begun at Camp Benning when Dwight D. Eisenhower arrived from Camp Colt on December 24, 1918 (he remained until March 15, 1919, and about 250 Camp Colt soldiers were transferred to Camp Benning after the armistice.) On December 26, 1918, a portion of the Camp Polk tank school was transferred to Camp Benning "to work in conjunction with the Infantry school". Camp Benning tank troops were moved to Camp Meade from February 19 to 21, 1919; and Clopton was ordered to Camp Meade on February 24, 1919).

The "Office of Director of the Tank Corps" was absorbed by the command of Brigadier General Samuel D. Rockenbach on August 15, 1919 after Rockenbach returned from Europe on July 19, 1919 (he had arrived in Europe in June 1917). In 1919, General John J. Pershing, "appearing before a joint session of the Senate and House Committee on Military Affairs, suggested that the A.E.F. Tank Corps become an adjunct to the Infantry." The National Defense Act of 1920 disbanded the National Army and the remaining two heavy and four light tank battalions became part of the infantry.

== Medal of Honor recipients ==
Two members of the Tank Corps, both from the 344th Battalion, received the Medal of Honor: Donald M. Call and Harold W. Roberts.
