= Donald M. Call =

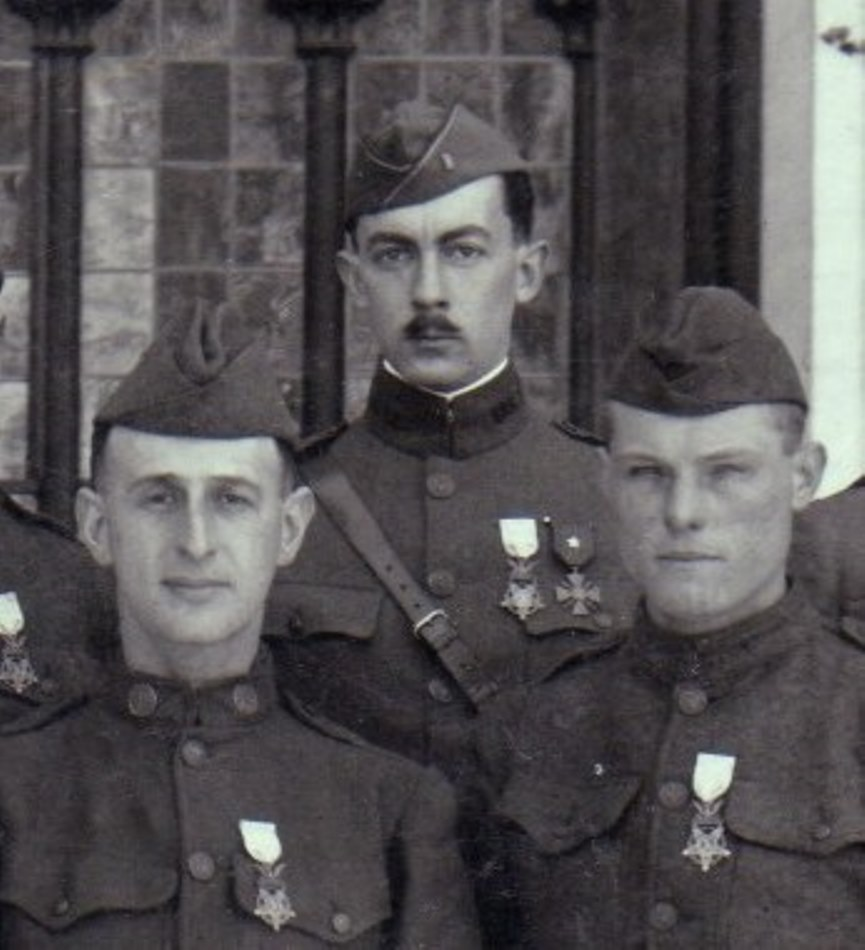
- Second Lieutenant Donald M. Call (center) wearing his Medal of Honor and French Croix de guerre with silver star. First Sergeant Sydney G. Gumpertz is to the lower left and Private First Class Charles D. Barger is to the lower right. The photograph was taken at the conclusion of their Medal of Honor presentation ceremony held at Chaumont, France, on February 9, 1919. General John J. Pershing presided.
- Born: November 29, 1892; Larchmont, New York
- Died: March 19, 1984 (aged 91)
- Burial place: In a flower garden in Bethesda, Maryland
- Military career
- Allegiance: United States of America
- Branch: United States Army
- Service years: 1917 - 1919
- Rank: Corporal later Second Lieutenant
- Units: 344th Battalion, Tank Corps
- Conflicts: World War I
- Awards: Medal of Honor; Purple Heart

Donald Marshall Call (November 29, 1892–March 19, 1984) was a United States Army soldier during World War I who received the Medal of Honor.

== Biography ==
Call was the son of the late Edward Payson Call, once business manager of The Journal of Commerce, and a grandson of General Francis X. Marshall, a well-known Indian fighter and one of the pioneers of Colorado. He was also the son-in-law of New York State Senator Clarence Lexow.

Prior to the war, he had studied landscape architecture at Harvard University in Cambridge, Massachusetts, and performed as a stage actor. Following the war, he resumed his acting career and in 1926 he became the resident landscaping architect for Conde Nast Publications and later worked in the Vogue magazine Pattern Department. In 1936, he obtained employment with the Federal Housing Administration in Washington, D.C. and ten years later opened a landscaping business there, running it until his retirement 1975. Call died in 1984 at the age of 91.

== Military service ==
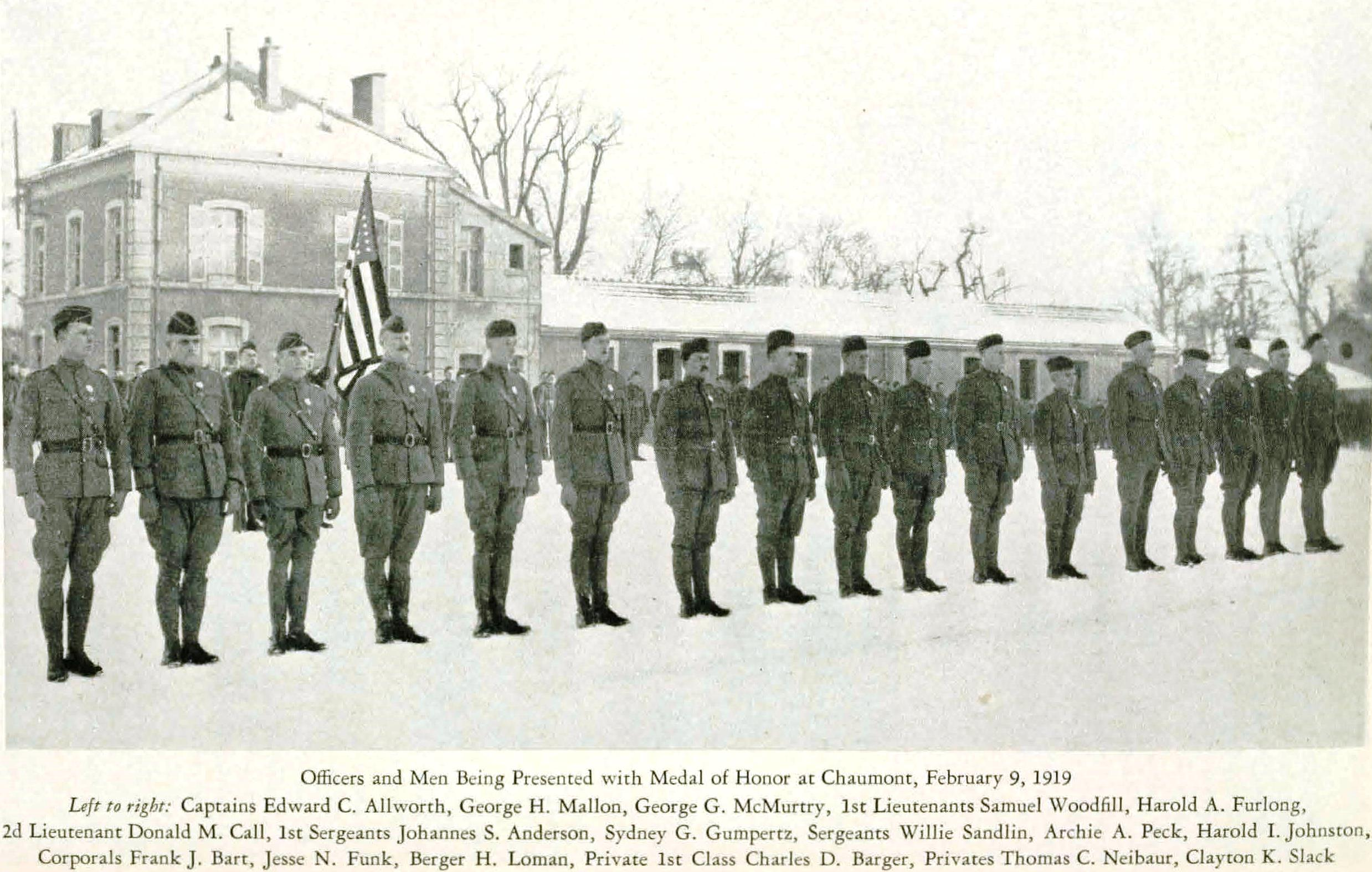
Medal of Honor presentation ceremony on February 9, 1919, at Chaumont, France. General John J. Pershing presided.

He was working as an actor in the stage production Fair and Warmer when the United States entered the war. He enlisted in the City Club Unit of the American Field Service and served as an ambulance driver with S.S.U. 32 of the American Hospital of Neuilly-sur-Seine, France, for a period of three months. On July 31, 1917, S.S.U. 32 left the camp at May-en-Multien and came to Paris to get its ambulances. It left the city in convoy on August 2, arriving two days later at Ablois Saint-Martin. On August 16, it was attached to an attacking division, the 48th French Division de Maroc, until February, 1919. On August 28, it moved with the division to Romigny, near Verdun. The division remained here until October 2, when it went into the line on the Verdun front in a sector on the Meuse River. S.S.U. 32's cantonment area was at Houdainville. During his service with the French division, Call was awarded a divisional citation for the Croix de Guerre with silver star. S.S.U. 32 returned for rest and recuperation on November 4, and was relieved by the men who were to take over S.S.U. 32 under U.S. Army command. Thereafter, S.S.U. 32 was redesignated Unit 644 of the U.S.A. Ambulance Service. It was at this point, on September 22, 1917, that Call enlisted in American Field Service Unit 644 as a private.

He transferred to the Tank Corps on April 1, 1918, and was made a corporal in B Company, 344th Battalion. The 344th Battalion was subordinated to the 1st Provisional Brigade, Tank Corps, which then Lieutenant Colonel George S. Patton, Jr. commanded. It was while serving in the 344th Battalion that Call earned the Medal of Honor. The French government once again recognized his bravery by awarding him the Legion of Honor in the degree of Chevalier and an additional Croix de Guerre with palm. He was also awarded the Montenegrin Order of Prince Danilo I. Two days after the Medal of Honor exploit, from which he emerged unscathed, Call was wounded and spent some time in the hospital. He returned to the front line in time to participate in the Argonne and St. Mihiel offensives. Call was commissioned as a second lieutenant in October, 1918. On February 9, 1919, General John J. Pershing formally presented Second Lieutenant Call, and 16 other Medal of Honor recipients, with their Medal of Honor decoration at an outdoor ceremony at Chaumont, France.

== Medal of Honor citation ==
Rank and organization: Corporal, U.S. Army, 344th Battalion, Tank Corps. Place and date: At Varennes, France; September 26, 1918. Entered service at: France. Birth: November 29, 1892; New York, New York. General Orders: War Department, General Orders No. 13 (January 18, 1919).

Citation:

During an operation against enemy machinegun nests west of Varennes, Corporal Call was in a tank with an officer when half of the turret was knocked off by a direct artillery hit. Choked by gas from the high-explosive shell, he left the tank and took cover in a shell hole 30 yards away. Seeing that the officer did not follow, and thinking that he might be alive, Corporal Call returned to the tank under intense machinegun and shell fire and carried the officer over a mile under machinegun and sniper fire to safety.

== Military awards ==
Call's military decorations and awards include the following:

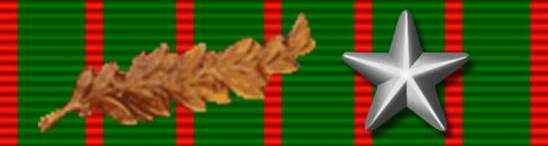

1st row	Medal of Honor		
2nd row	Purple Heart	World War I Victory Medal w/two bronze service stars to denote credit for the St. Mihiel and Meuse-Argonne battle clasps.	Ordre national de la Légion d'honneur degree of Knight (French Republic)
3rd row	Croix de guerre 1914–1918 w/bronze palm and silver star (French Republic)	Croce al Merito di Guerra (Italy)	Орден Књаза Данила I degree of Knight (Kingdom of Montenegro)

== See also ==
- List of Medal of Honor recipients
- List of Medal of Honor recipients for World War I
