= Vernon Evans (United States Army officer) =

US Army general (1893–1987)

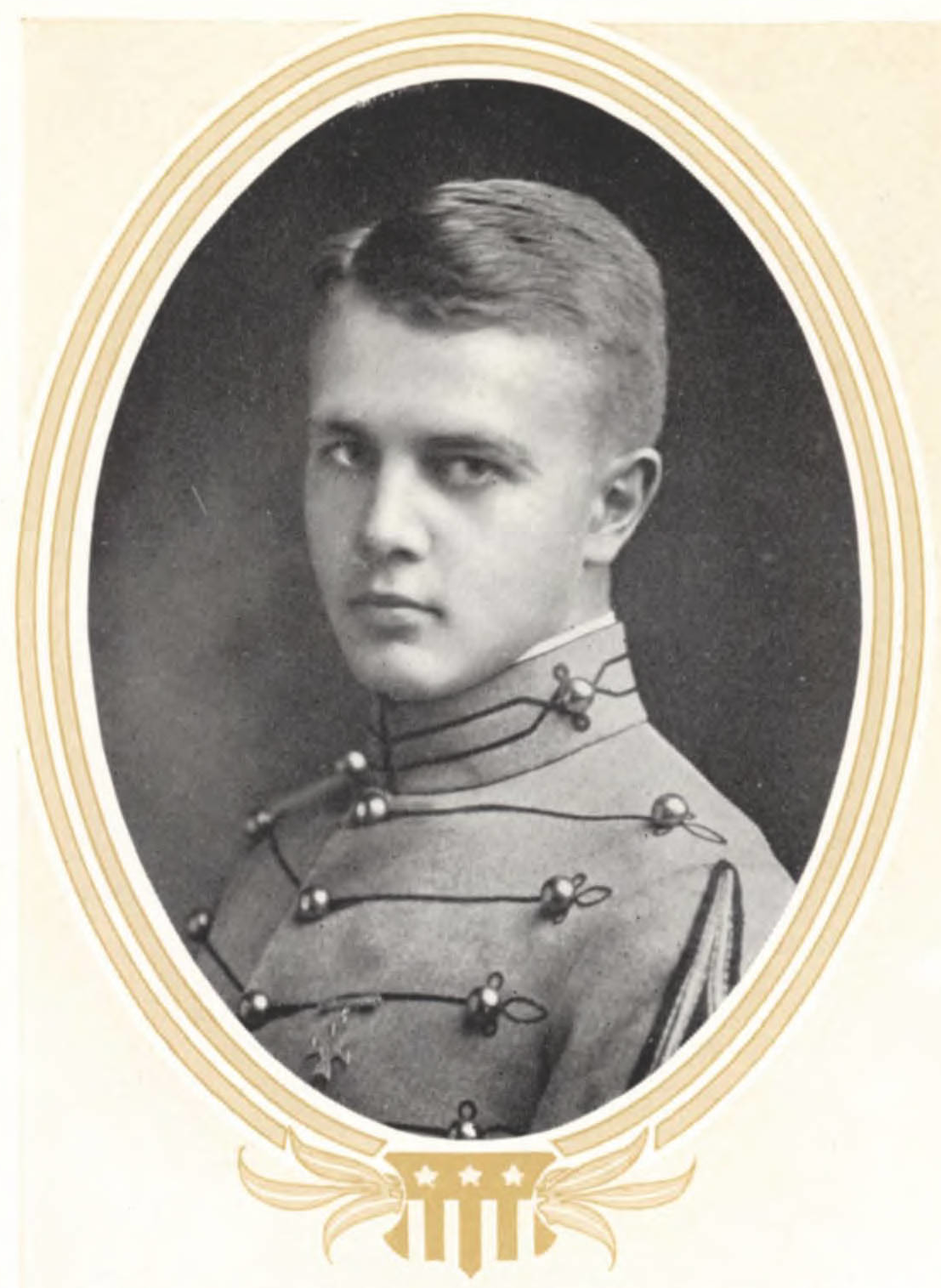
- At West Point in 1915
- Born: 21 August 1893; Michigan, United States
- Died: 4 November 1987 (aged 94); Bethesda, Maryland, United States
- Burial place: Arlington National Cemetery
- Relatives: William Pierce Evans, father Vernon Evans Jr., son
- Military career
- Allegiance: United States
- Branch: United States Army
- Service years: 1915–1954
- Rank: Major General
- Service number: 0-3818
- Unit: Infantry Branch
- Commands: 3rd Battalion, 66th Infantry Regiment; 81st Tank Regiment; China Burma India Theater
- Conflicts: World War I World War II
- Awards: Army Distinguished Service Medal

Major General Vernon Evans (21 August 1893 – 4 November 1987) was an officer in the United States Army who had a long and distinguished military career spanning almost four decades, from 1915 to 1954. A 1915 graduate of the United States Military Academy (USMA), he served in combat in France during World War I, advanced through the ranks and attended the required professional schools between the wars and served in staff and command positions during World War II, including command of the lesser known China Burma India Theater (CBI). After the war he served as the inspector general of United States European Command and headed the military mission that supported the Shah of Iran. He retired as a major general in January 1953. Evans died on 4 November 1987, aged 94, of kidney failure in Bethesda, Maryland.

== Early life and education ==
Vernon Evans was born on 21 August 1893, in Michigan to William Pierce Evans (an 1878 graduate of the United States Military Academy). On 14 June 1911, at the age of 17, he began his studies at the United States Military Academy (USMA) at West Point, New York, having received an at-large appointment as a resident of Washington, D.C. He graduated on 12 June 1915, as a member of the class the stars fell on; his rank in his class is 55 of 164 and his Cullum number is 5367.

Evans was commissioned as a second lieutenant in the Infantry Branch and was assigned to the 22nd Infantry Regiment on the day of his graduation. He performed duty with a company of the 22nd Infantry in Douglas and Warren, Arizona from 12 September 1915 to March 1917.

== World War I ==
After Congress declared war on Germany on 6 April 1917, Evans continued to serve with the 22nd Infantry Regiment in April and May 1917 at Fort Hamilton, New York and Ellis Island, New York and as an instructor at the Reserve Officers Training Camp, Fort Niagara, New York from May to August 1917. Evans was assigned to the 18th Infantry Regiment at Gettysburg, Pennsylvania from September to October 1917, from which he departed for France to serve with the American Expeditionary Forces (AEF), arriving on 11 November 1917. Two companies from provisional training battalions of the 18th and 28th Infantry Regiments were organized into the 1st Machine Gun Battalion, 1st Division. Evans was assigned to the 1st Machine Gun battalion in November 1917.

He was temporarily promoted to major of infantry on 17 June 1918 and assigned as an instructor at machine gun schools in France until March 1919, four months after the Armistice with Germany which brought the war to an end, when he was assigned to the Office of Civil Affairs of the Third Army, commanded by Major General Joseph T. Dickman, at Coblenz, Germany.

== Interwar years ==
Evans rank was reduced to captain on 15 March 1920, at approximately the same time he was reassigned to company duty in the U.S. with the 26th Infantry Regiment at Camp Taylor, Kentucky; Camp Perry, Ohio; and Fort Dix, New Jersey until October 1920. He was promoted to major of infantry a second time on 1 July 1920. Evans was assigned to the Infantry School at Fort Benning, Georgia, as an instructor, as a student officer, and again as an instructor from October 1920 to June 1923. While at Fort Benning, he was returned to the grade of captain a second time on 4 November 1922. Following a tour of duty in the Office of the Chief of Infantry in Washington, D.C., during which he was promoted to major of infantry for the third and final time on 24 July 1924. Evans attended the United States Army Command and General Staff College at Fort Leavenworth, Kansas from September 1925 to June 1926; he was a distinguished graduate. He was added to the General Staff Corps Eligible List. Evans was next assigned as a battalion commander of the 26th Infantry Regiment at Plattsburg Barracks, New York from June 1926 to August 1927. He attended the Army War College in Washington, D.C. from August 1927 to July 1928. After graduating, he was assigned back to the Office of the Chief of Infantry for a brief time before being assigned as the executive officer of the 19th Brigade at Fort Davis in the Canal Zone from December 1928 to July 1931.

Returning from the Canal Zone, Evans taught at the Infantry School and Georgetown University in Washington, D.C. from August 1931 to July 1936. He was promoted to lieutenant colonel of infantry on 1 July 1936. He attended the tank course at the Infantry School from September 1938 to June 1939. Evans commanded the 3rd Battalion, 66th Infantry Regiment at Fort Devens, Massachusetts from July 1939 to July 1940. Evans was assigned as chief of a section of the Infantry School until September 1941; during this assignment, he was promoted to colonel in the Army of the United States (AUS) on 1 July 1941. Evans commanded the 81st Tank Regiment at Fort Knox, Kentucky and Camp Cooke, California until October 1942, ten months after the American entry into World War II.

== World War II ==
Following the country's entrance into the war, Evans was promoted to brigadier general (AUS), on 10 September 1942. Haskew relates that he was assigned to the 13th Armored Division as the commander of Combat Command B (October 1942 until an unspecified end date. Cullum places him as the commanding general of Combat Command B of the 5th Armored Division at Camp Beale, California during approximately the same period (unspecified start date to October 1943). Both sources place him next in China Burma India Theater (CBI). Evans assumed the position of deputy chief of staff of CBI in India and, on 1 November 1943, was advanced from lieutenant colonel to colonel. In October 1944, he was advanced to chief of staff of CBI in India, a position he occupied until February 1946. On 4 January 1945, Evans was promoted to major general in the Army of the United States and was awarded the Army Distinguished Service Medal.

== Post war and final years ==
In February 1946, Evans assumed command of CBI, a post he held until 31 May 1946. He returned to the U.S. for duty as an assistant budget officer at the Department of the Army from June 1946 to June 1948. During this period his promotion to major general was terminated on 30 June 1946; however, on 24 January 1948 he was permanently promoted to brigadier general and again to major general in the AUS. He was assigned as the inspector general of the United States European Command in Berlin, Germany until September 1948. From September 1948 to June 1951, Evans was Chief of the U.S. Military Mission with the Iranian Army in Teheran, Persia. In November 1952, Evans was assigned to the Army Personnel Board, Office of the Secretary of the Army. He retired in January 1953.

Evans died on 4 November 1987 of kidney failure at the Carriage Hill nursing home in Bethesda, Maryland. He was buried at Arlington National Cemetery.

== Summary of service ==
=== Dates of rank ===
| Rank | Unit/Branch | Date |
|---|---|---|
| Cadet | United States Military Academy | 14 June 1911 |
| Second Lieutenant | 22nd Infantry Regiment | 12 June 1915 |
| First Lieutenant | 22nd Infantry Regiment | 1 July 1916 |
| Captain | 22nd Infantry Regiment | 15 May 1917 |
| Major (Temporary) | Infantry | 17 June 1918 |
| Captain | Infantry | 15 March 1920 |
| Major | Infantry | 1 July 1920 |
| Captain | Infantry | 4 November 1922 |
| Major | Infantry | 24 July 1924 |
| Lieutenant Colonel | Infantry | 1 July 1936 |
| Colonel | Army of the United States | 1 July 1941 |
| Brigadier General | Army of the United States | 10 September 1942 |
| Colonel | Infantry | 1 November 1943 |
| Major General | Army of the United States | 4 January 1945 |
| Colonel | Infantry | 30 June 1946 |
| Brigadier General | United States Army | 24 January 1948 |
| Major General | Army of the United States | 24 January 1948 |

=== Awards ===
| Army Distinguished Service Medal |
| World War I Victory Medal (United States) |
| Army of Occupation of Germany Medal |
| World War II Victory Medal |
| Asiatic-Pacific Campaign Medal |
| World War II Victory Medal |
