= 66th Brigade =

66th Brigade may refer to:

== China ==
- 66th Brigade (China)

== Ukraine ==
- 66th Mechanized Brigade (Ukraine)

== United Kingdom ==
- 66th Anti-Aircraft Brigade
- 66th Infantry Brigade (United Kingdom)
- 66th Brigade, Royal Field Artillery, British Army unit during World War I
- 66th (South Midland) Brigade, Royal Field Artillery, British Army unit after World War I
- 66th (Leeds Rifles, The West Yorkshire Regiment) Anti-Aircraft Brigade, Royal Artillery

== United States ==
- 66th Military Intelligence Brigade (United States)
- 66th Theater Aviation Command, an aviation brigade

== See also ==
- 66th Division (disambiguation)
- 66th Regiment (disambiguation)
