= 66 =

66 may refer to:

- 66 (number), the natural number following 65 and preceding 67
- One of the years 66 BC, AD 66, 1966, 2066
- "66", a song by Lil Yachty featuring Trippie Redd, 2018
- "66", a song by Felo Le Tee and Myztro, 2021
- 66 (album), a 2024 album by Paul Weller
- "66", a song by the Afghan Whigs, from the album 1965
- Sixty-Six (card game), a German card game
- Sixty Six (film), a 2006 film
- Sixty-Six, a novel by film director Barry Levinson
- 66 Maja, a main-belt asteroid
- Volvo 66, a small family car manufactured by Volvo
- DAF 66, a small family car manufactured by DAF
- The international calling code for Thailand
- Execute order 66, a Star Wars reference

== See also ==
- 66th (disambiguation)
- Order 66 (disambiguation)
- Phillips 66, an American multinational energy company
- List of highways numbered 66
  - U.S. Route 66, a historic U.S. highway
  - Interstate 66, a U.S. highway
- WNBC (AM), on frequency 660 AM, was commonly referred historically as "66 WNBC"
