= 66th Division =

In military terms, 66th Division or 66th Infantry Division may refer to:

== Infantry divisions ==
- 66th Infantry Division (Bangladesh)
- 66th Division (Imperial Japanese Army)
- 66th Infantry Division (Russian Empire)
- 66th Infantry Division (South Korea)
- 66th Guards Mechanized Division, Soviet Union
- 66th Guards Rifle Division, Soviet Union
- 66th Rifle Division, Soviet Union
- 66th Division (Spain)
- 66th Division (Syria)
- 66th Mechanized Infantry Division, Turkey
- 66th (2nd East Lancashire) Division, British Army, First World War
- 66th Infantry Division (United Kingdom), British Army, Second World War
- 66th Infantry Division (United States), United States Army

== Cavalry divisions ==
- 66th Cavalry Division (United States), United States Army

== Other divisions ==
- 66th Anti-Aircraft Artillery Division, Soviet Union

== See also ==
- List of military divisions by number
- 66th Brigade (disambiguation)
- 66th Regiment (disambiguation)
