= 66th Infantry Division (Russian Empire) =

- 66-я пехотная дивизия
- Active: 1914–1918
- Country: Russian Empire
- Branch: Russian Imperial Army
- Role: Infantry

The 66th Infantry Division (Russian: 66-я пехотная дивизия, 66-ya Pekhotnaya Diviziya) was an infantry formation of the Russian Imperial Army.

== Organization ==
- 1st Brigade
  - 261st Infantry Regiment
  - 262nd Infantry Regiment
- 2nd Brigade
  - 263rd Infantry Regiment
  - 264th Infantry Regiment
