= 66th Infantry Division (South Korea) =

- 제66보병사단
- Division insignia
- Active: 1 March 1982 – present
- Country: South Korea
- Branch: Republic of Korea Army
- Type: Infantry
- Role: Reserve forces
- Size: Division
- Part of: Mobilization Force Command
- Garrison/HQ: Gapyeong County, Gyeonggi
- Nickname(s): "Torch"
- Colors: Indigo, White

Commanders
- Current commander: Brig. Gen. Mun Seok-ho

The 66th Infantry Division (Korean: 제66보병사단, Hanja: 第六十六步兵師團) is a military formation of the Republic of Korea Reserve Forces and Republic of Korea Army. The division is subordinated to the Mobilization Force Command and is headquartered in Gapyeong County, Gyeonggi Province and was created on 1 March 1982. During the peacetime, they are in charge of recruit training and active as a second line military unit.

== Organization ==
- Headquarters:
  - Headquarters Battalion
  - Reconnaissance Battalion
  - Engineer Battalion
  - Armor Battalion (M48A5K)
  - Chemical Company
  - Signal Battalion
  - Support Battalion
  - Medical Battalion
- 187th Infantry Brigade
- 188th Infantry Brigade
- 189th Infantry Brigade
- Artillery Brigade
  - 3 Artillery Battalions
