= Order 66 (disambiguation) =

Order 66 is a command given by Supreme Chancellor Sheev Palpatine, secretly the Dark Lord of the Sith Darth Sidious, to the Clone Troopers of the Grand Army of the Republic in the Star Wars franchise.

Order 66 may also refer to:

- Star Wars Republic Commando: Order 66, the fourth novel in the Republic Commando series, written by Karen Traviss
- Order 66/2523, a 1980 anti-communist directive of the Thai government
- Standing Order 66, a 1713 British Parliamentary procedure
