= 71st Infantry Division (United States) =

US Army unit

- 71st Infantry Division shoulder sleeve insignia
- Active: 10 July 1943–11 March 1946; 7 October 1954–15 September 1956
- Country: United States
- Branch: United States Army
- Type: Infantry
- Size: Division
- Nickname: "The Red Circle"
- Engagements: World War II; Rhineland; Central Europe

Commanders
- Notable commanders: William Westmoreland; Willard G. Wyman

Insignia
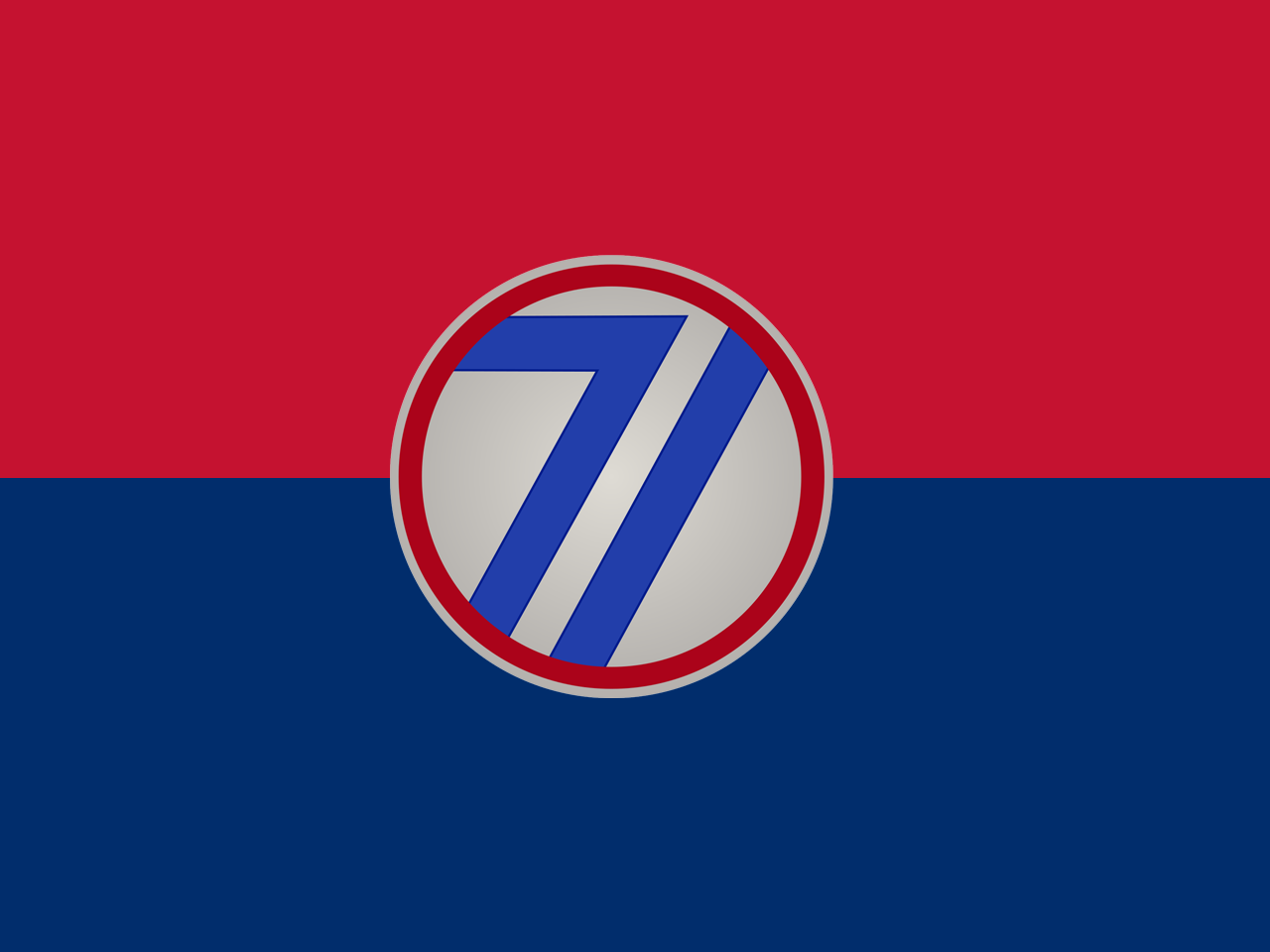
- Flag of the United States Army 71st Infantry Division

The 71st Infantry Division was a unit of the United States Army in World War II.

== History ==
=== World War II ===
==== Formation ====
Activated on 15 July 1943 at Camp Carson, Colorado, the division was first organized as the 71st Light Division (Pack), intended for use in mountainous or jungle areas. Smaller than the standard 14,000-man infantry division, at about 9,000 personnel, its primary means of transport was hundreds of horses and mules controlled by several quartermaster pack companies of muleteers. For artillery, the division had three battalions of 1,439 lb (653 kg) 75 mm pack howitzers which could be broken down and carried by mule train, instead of the standard 4,980 lb (2,260 kg) M2A1 105 mm howitzer.

The 5th and 14th Infantry Regiments, Regular Army units which had been stationed in the Panama Canal Zone for several years prior to the war and had received extensive training in jungle operations during that time, were assigned to the division to provide the nucleus of jungle expertise. The 66th Infantry Regiment was constituted in the Regular Army on 10 July 1943, and activated and assigned to the division on 15 July 1943 as its third regiment. The division's three field artillery battalions, the 607th, 608th, and 609th, were organized at the Mountain Training Center at Camp Hale, Colorado. The cadre for the division's 271st Engineer Combat Battalion came from the 61st Engineer Combat Battalion of the Eastern Defense Command and the 89th Light Division's 314th Engineer Combat Battalion.

Personnel for the 371st Medical Battalion came from the 34th Infantry Regiment (stationed in Hawaii), the 89th Infantry Division, the 5th Infantry Regiment, and the medical replacement training center at Camp Barkeley, Texas. The division also included the 771st Ordnance Light Maintenance Platoon, the 731st Antiaircraft Artillery Machine Gun Battery, and the 581st Antitank Battery. The division's quartermaster assets included the 251st, 252nd, and 253rd Quartermaster Pack Companies.

==== Training and maneuvers ====
After training at Camp Carson, Colorado, the division was sent to Hunter Liggett Military Reservation in the mountains inland from Big Sur, California, in late February 1944, where it maneuvered against the 89th Light Division in a three-month comprehensive test of the light division concept. As a result of the test, it was decided that the light divisions had insufficient manpower and firepower to be effective, and the concept was abandoned. Towards the end of the maneuvers, 3,500 men were withdrawn for use as overseas replacements, being replaced mostly by students from the drastically-reduced Army Specialized Training Program. The 71st Division was sent to Fort Benning, Georgia, in May 1944, where it was reorganized and retrained as a standard infantry division.

==== Conversion to a standard infantry division ====
The division remained unusual in having Regular Army infantry regiments assigned to a division raised in the Army of the United States. The division artillery was reequipped with 105 mm howitzers, and the 564th Field Artillery Battalion, equipped with 155 mm howitzers, was activated and assigned as the division's fourth field artillery battalion. The 731st Antiaircraft Artillery Machine Gun Battery was dissolved and its personnel were absorbed by other units of the division, while the 581st Antitank Battery was assigned as the 5th Infantry Regiment's Antitank Company. The 771st Ordnance Light Maintenance Platoon was increased in size to a company. The 252nd and 253rd Quartermaster Pack Companies were assigned to Fort Benning, while the 251st Quartermaster Pack Company remained assigned to the division and was redesignated the 251st Quartermaster Company. Filler replacements to increase the division to full strength began to arrive in July and August, but it did not reach full strength until October.

==== Division organization ====
The 71st Infantry Division consisted of the following units.

71st Infantry Division organization (click to enlarge)

- 71st Infantry Division
  - 71st Infantry Division Headquarters
  - 71st Cavalry Reconnaissance Troop (Mechanized) (M3 scout cars and then M8 Greyhound armored cars)
  - 5th Infantry Regiment
    - Headquarters and Headquarters Company
    - 3× Infantry battalions
      - each battalion consists of: 1× Headquarters and Headquarters Company, 3× Rifle companies, 1× Heavy Weapons Company
    - Cannon Company (T12 Gun Motor Carriages and T19 Howitzer Motor Carriages, later replaced by either M3 105mm towed howitzers or M7 Priest self propelled howitzers)
    - Anti-Tank Company (M3 37mm anti-tank guns, which were replaced by 1944 with M1 57mm anti-tank guns)
    - Service Company
  - 14th Infantry Regiment
    - same organization as 5th Infantry Regiment
  - 66th Infantry Regiment
    - same organization as 5th Infantry Regiment
  - 71st Infantry Division Artillery
    - Headquarters and Headquarters Battery
    - 564th Field Artillery Battalion
      - Headquarters and Headquarters Battery
      - 3× Batteries (M1 155mm towed howitzers)
      - Service Battery
    - 607th Field Artillery Battalion
      - Headquarters and Headquarters Battery
      - 3× Batteries (M2 105mm towed howitzers)
      - Service Battery
    - 608th Field Artillery Battalion
      - same organization as 607th Field Artillery Battalion
    - 609th Field Artillery Battalion
      - same organization as 607th Field Artillery Battalion
  - Headquarters Special Troops
    - Headquarters Company, 71st Infantry Division
    - 571st Signal Company
    - 251st Quartermaster Company
    - 771st Ordnance Light Maintenance Company
    - Military Police Platoon
    - 71st Infantry Division Band (attached)
  - 271st Engineer Combat Battalion
    - Headquarters and Headquarters and Service Company
    - 3× Engineer combat companies
  - 371st Medical Battalion
    - Headquarters and Headquarters Detachment
    - 3× Collecting companies
    - Clearing Company

==== Combat chronicle ====
The 71st Infantry Division departed United States on 26 January 1945, arriving at Le Havre, France, on 6 February 1945, and training at Camp Old Gold with headquarters at Limesy. The division moved east, relieved the 100th Infantry Division at Ratswiller and saw its first action on 11 March 1945. Their ouster of the Germans from France began on 15 March. The division moved through outer belts of the Siegfried Line, captured Pirmasens on 21 March, and crossed the Rhine at Oppenheim on 30 March. The 71st continued the advance, taking Coburg without resistance, cutting the Munich-Berlin autobahn on 13 April, and capturing Bayreuth after fierce opposition on 16 April. Moving south, the Division destroyed Schönfeld on 18 April, took Rosenberg, crossed the Naab River at Kallmünz on 24 April and the Danube to the east of Regensburg on the night of 25 April (the city fell on 27). Straubing was taken on 28 April. As resistance crumbled, the division crossed the Isar on 29 April and entered Austria on 2 May.

The division participated in the liberation of concentration camps including one in Austria called Gunskirchen Lager, a subcamp of Mauthausen, on 4 May. A pamphlet was produced by the US Army after they liberated the camp, called "The Seventy-First came to Gunskirchen Lager." The book recounts in detail, and with graphic photos, the tragedy they found in the camp. The complete booklet is available for free on-line.

The 71st organized and occupied defensive positions along the Enns River and contacted Russian forces east of Linz, 8 May, the day before hostilities ceased, having gone further east than any other U.S. Army unit.

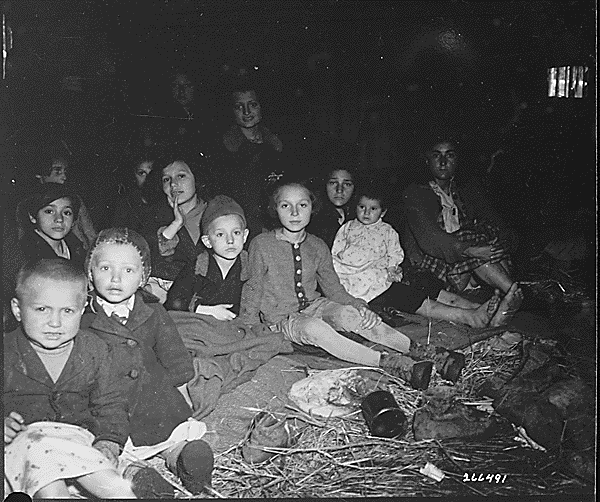
Jewish women and children liberated from a concentration camp by the 71st during final days of World War II in Europe

In January 1946, Colonel William Westmoreland was appointed commander, and was responsible for leading the units that had not yet been deactivated back to the United States so they could be demobilized. The division was assigned occupational duties until it left for home in March 1946, arriving on 10 and being inactivated on 12 at Camp Kilmer, New Jersey.

During the last several weeks of the war, the 761st Tank Battalion, an African-American unit, was attached to the 71st Division and fought with it. The 71st Division is also the formation in which Lt. John D. Eisenhower, General Dwight Eisenhower's son, served.

==== Campaigns ====
- Rhineland
- Central Europe

Days of combat: 62

==== Casualties ====
- Total battle casualties: 1,114
- Killed in action: 243
- Wounded in action: 843
- Missing in action: 9
- Prisoner of war: 19

==== Assignments in ETO ====
- 21 January 1945: Fifteenth Army, 12th Army Group.
- 2 March 1945: Seventh Army, 6th Army Group.
- 9 March 1945: XV Corps.
- 22 March 1945: XXI Corps.
- 25 March 1945: VI Corps.
- 29 March 1945: 12th Army Group.
- 8 April 1945: Third Army, 12th Army Group.
- 11 April 1945: XII Corps.
- 20 April 1945: XX Corps.

==== Awards ====
- 11 Distinguished Service Crosses
  - 1st Lt Lee J. Barstow
  - S/Sgt Charles L. Campbell (Posth.)
  - 2nd Lt Frank J. Hagney
  - Pfc Lawrence T. Levandowski
  - Col Carl E. Lundquist
  - S/Sgt Hal H. McColl
  - Cpl Anthony J. Nagem (Posth.)
  - Pfc Guillermo G. Rosas
  - Lt Col Evert S. Thomas, Jr.
  - 1st Lt Frederick L. Tyler
  - Col Sidney C. Wooten
- 1 Distinguished Service Medal
- 167 Silver Stars (2 clusters)
- 1 Legion of Merit
- 7 Soldier's Medals
- 695 Bronze Stars
- 27 Air Medals (8 clusters)

=== Post War ===
In 1954 the 71st Infantry Division was reactivated in the northwest United States and Alaska as the division headquarters for several geographically separated units, to include the 53d Infantry Regiment headquartered at Fort Richardson, Alaska, with additional units stationed at Fort Greely, and the 4th and 5th Infantry regiments at Fort Lewis, Washington. The 723rd Tank Battalion was also withdrawn from the Army Reserve and activated at Camp Irwin and assigned to the 71st. In this status the division was known as a "static division" not capable of or intended for deployment. (A second "static" unit, the 23d Infantry Division, was activated in the Caribbean region.)

Units of the reactivated 71st Infantry Division included the following:

- Headquarters
- Headquarters Company
- Medical Detachment, Division HQ
- 71st Infantry Division Band
- 71st Military Police Company
- 771st Ordnance Battalion
- 71st Quartermaster Company
- 71st Replacement Company
- 71st Signal Company
- 71st Reconnaissance Company
- 723d Tank Battalion (120mm Gun)
- 371st Medical Battalion
- 271st Engineer Battalion (Combat)
- 4th Infantry Regiment
- 5th Infantry Regiment
- 53d Infantry Regiment
- Headquarters and Headquarters Battery, 71st Division Artillery
- Medical Detachment, 71st Division Artillery
- 555th Field Artillery Battalion (105mm Howitzer, Towed)
- 564th Field Artillery Battalion (155mm Howitzer, Towed)
- 167th Antiaircraft Artillery Battalion (AW)(SP)
- 274th Armored Field Artillery Battalion (105mm Howitzer, SP)
- 607th Armored Field Artillery Battalion (105mm Howitzer, SP)

The division lasted in this status for less than two years, being inactivated at Fort Lewis on 15 September 1956.

== Commanders ==
Brig. Gen. Robert L. Spragins (July 1943 – October 1944), Maj. Gen. Eugene M. Landrum (October–November 1944), Maj. Gen. Willard G. Wyman (November 1944-16 August 1945), Brig. Gen. Onslow S. Rolfe (17 August 1945 – 10 October 1945), Maj. Gen. A. Arnim White (October 1945 – February 1946), Col. William Westmoreland (February–June 1946).

== General ==
- Nickname: The Red Circle.
- Shoulder patch: A red circle with a white center bearing the Arabic numerals "71" in blue and placed diagonally.
