= Onslow S. Rolfe =

United States Army general

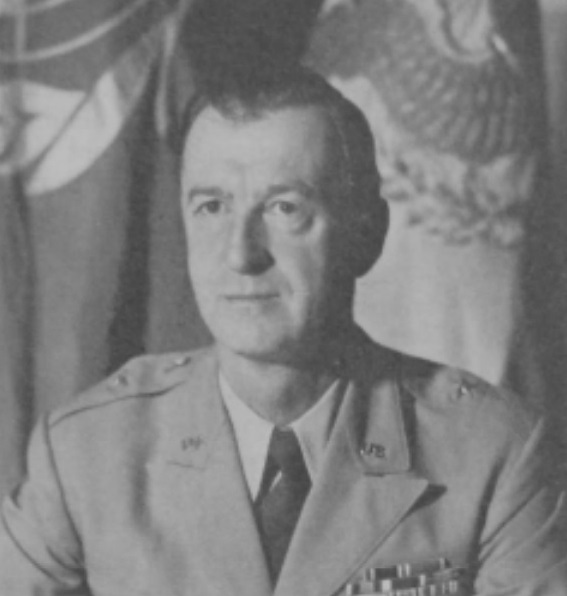
- 1953 photo of Rolfe as commander of Headquarters and Service Command, Far East Command.
- Born: Onslow Sherburne Rolfe; January 16, 1895; Concord, New Hampshire, US
- Died: January 29, 1985 (aged 90); Winter Park, Florida, US
- Burial place: Arlington National Cemetery
- Relatives: Onslow Stearns (grandfather)
- Military career
- Allegiance: United States of America
- Branch: United States Army
- Service years: 1917–1954
- Rank: Brigadier General
- Service number: 0-8637
- Unit: Infantry Branch
- Commands: 1st Battalion, 87th Mountain Infantry Regiment; 87th Mountain Infantry Regiment; Mountain Training Center, Camp Hale, Colorado; Land Area Salzburg; 71st Infantry Division; Northern Command Area, Japan Logistics Command; Headquarters and Service Command, Far East Command
- Conflicts: World War I World War II; Korean War
- Awards: Distinguished Service Cross; Distinguished Service Medal; Legion of Merit; Purple Heart

Onslow S. Rolfe (January 16, 1895 – January 29, 1985) was a career officer in the United States Army. He attained the rank of brigadier general during World War II as commander of the Mountain Training Center at Camp Hale, Colorado, and the 71st Infantry Division.

Rolfe graduated from West Point shortly before U.S. involvement in World War I. He served in combat with the 7th Infantry Regiment, and received the Distinguished Service Cross for heroism and the Purple Heart for wounds suffered in a gas attack. Between World Wars I and II, Rolfe carried out a variety of assignments with increasing rank and responsibility, including professor of military science at Rutgers University, and senior observer and advisor for the Wisconsin National Guard. He also graduated from the Command and General Staff College and the Field Artillery Officer Course, after which he served as senior Infantry instructor at the Fort Sill Field Artillery School.

During World War II, Rolfe specialized in winter operations and mountain warfare; he commanded 1st Battalion, 87th Mountain Infantry Regiment, then advanced to command of the regiment. After promotion to brigadier general, he commanded the Camp Hale, Colorado Mountain Training Center, where he oversaw organization and training of the 10th Light Division (Alpine).

Near the end of World War II, Rolfe went to France as deputy commander of the 71st Infantry Division, and took part in the Rhineland campaign and the Western Allied invasion of Germany. Rolfe performed post-war occupation duty in Austria, and commanded Land Area Salzburg and the 71st Infantry Division.

After World War II, Rolfe was chief of the development section in the research and development office at Headquarters, Army Field Forces. During the Korean War, he commanded the Japan Logistics Command's Northern Command Area, and then Headquarters and Service Command, Far East Command. After his 1954 retirement, Rolfe resided in Winter Park, Florida. He died there on January 29, 1985, and was buried at Arlington National Cemetery.

== Early life ==
Onslow Sherburne Rolfe was born in Concord, New Hampshire on January 16, 1895. His father was Army Colonel Robert H. Rolfe, and his mother was Grace Stearns, the daughter of New Hampshire Governor Onslow Stearns.

Rolfe attended schools in several states, Cuba and Japan while his family moved for his father's military postings. He completed high school at St. Luke's Episcopal School in Wayne, Pennsylvania, and then attended Columbia Preparatory School in Washington, DC in anticipation of applying for admission to the United States Military Academy.

== Start of career and World War I ==
Rolfe was admitted to West Point in 1914; his classmates nicknamed him "Pinkey" because of his red hair and flushed complexion, and the nickname stuck with him for the rest of his career. His was ranked 109th of 151 students when his class graduated early in August 1917 because of the immediate need for officers as the army expanded during American entry into World War I. He was commissioned as a second lieutenant of Infantry, and was assigned to the 7th Infantry Regiment. He was promoted to first lieutenant on August 30.

In October Rolfe joined his regiment in Gettysburg, Pennsylvania. In late October and November, he attended the Infantry School of Arms at Fort Sill, Oklahoma. He then joined his regiment at Camp Greene, North Carolina and took part in pre-deployment training prior to going overseas. The regiment departed for France in March 1918.

After arriving in France the regiment took part in combat operations as part of the 3rd Division. Rolfe was a participant in the Second Battle of the Marne in July and August 1918, and received the Distinguished Service Cross for heroism while moving and positioning 3rd Division reinforcements during a critical juncture in the battle. He was promoted to captain in September 1918, and took part in the Meuse–Argonne offensive. Rolfe was wounded as the result of a gas attack in October, for which he received the Purple Heart. Rolfe was convalescing at a hospital in France when the Armistice of 11 November 1918 ended the war, and he remained hospitalized until January 1919.

== Between the wars ==
Rolfe's post-war assignments included the 131st Military Police Battalion (Fort Dix, New Jersey), 3rd Division Demobilization Group (Camp Pike, Arkansas), and Machine Gun Company, 4th Infantry Regiment (Fort Benning, Georgia).

In the 1920s and 1930s, Rolfe's assignments included postings with the 4th, 18th, and 27th Infantry Regiments. In addition, he was professor of military science at Rutgers University, and senior observer and advisor for the Wisconsin National Guard. Rolfe graduated from the Command and General Staff College in 1936, and then completed the Field Artillery Officer Course, after which he was assigned as senior Infantry instructor at the Fort Sill Field Artillery School.

== World War II ==
At the start of World War II the Army began to create and field units of light Infantry troops designed to operate in cold weather and at high altitudes. Rolfe was assigned to command 1st Battalion, 87th Mountain Infantry Regiment. His success at organizing this battalion and leading it during its initial training led to assignment as commander of the regiment and promotion to colonel. Unknown Army planners apparently thought assigning Rolfe to command a unit that would train to use skis and snowshoes was logical, because he had been born in New Hampshire; they were apparently unaware that he had left the state at six years old and had virtually no experience in winter sports. Despite his unfamiliarity with skiing and snowshoeing, Rolfe soon became proficient, and ensured that the soldiers in his regiment did likewise.

From 1942 to 1945 Rolfe commanded the Camp Hale, Colorado Mountain Training Center, and received promotion to brigadier general. During his command of Camp Hale, the 85th, 86th, and 87th Mountain Infantry Regiments were organized as the 10th Light Division (Alpine), and Rolfe was responsible for ensuring that the division had the facilities and equipment necessary to complete its training, to include ski slopes, cliffs for rappelling, skis, and winter camouflage uniforms.

Rolfe joined the 71st Infantry Division as assistant division commander in January 1945. The division took part in the Rhineland campaign and the Western Allied invasion of Germany. The 71st Division participated in the liberation of several concentration camps, including one in Austria called Gunskirchen Lager, a subcamp of the Mauthausen-Gusen facility. The 71st Division advanced further east than any other Allied unit, and made contact with Soviet forces near Linz on May 8, 1945.

== Post-World War II ==
The 71st Division carried out occupation duties in Austria after hostilities ceased, and Rolfe commanded Land Area Salzburg. From August 17 to October 10, 1945, Rolfe was commander of the 71st Infantry Division.

Rolfe returned to the United States in 1947 and was assigned as chief of the development section in the research and development office at Headquarters, Army Field Forces.

== Korean War ==
In 1952, Rolfe was assigned as commander of the Japan Logistics Command's Northern Command Area. From 1953 until his 1954 retirement, Rolfe served as commander of Headquarters and Service Command, Far East Command.

== Awards ==
In addition to the Distinguished Service Cross and Purple Heart, Rolfe received the Legion of Merit and the Soviet Order of the Patriotic War First Class for his service with the 71st Infantry Division. He was decorated with the Distinguished Service Medal for his post-World War II service in Japan.

=== Distinguished Service Cross citation ===
The President of the United States of America, authorized by Act of Congress, July 9, 1918, takes pleasure in presenting the Distinguished Service Cross to Captain (Infantry) Onslow Sherburne Rolfe, United States Army, for extraordinary heroism in action while serving with 7th Infantry Regiment, 3d Division, A.E.F., near Fossoy, France, July 14–15, 1918. During the heavy enemy bombardment preceding the second battle of the Marne, Captain Rolfe, regimental intelligence officer, voluntarily carried an important message, in full view of the enemy, across an open field to the support and reserve battalions for the purpose of bringing up reinforcements.

General Orders: War Department, General Orders No. 116 (1919) Action Date: July 14–15, 1918 Service: Army Rank: Captain Regiment: 7th Infantry Regiment Division: 3rd Division, American Expeditionary Forces

== Retirement ==
In retirement, Rolfe resided in Winter Park, Florida. He died in Winter Park on January 29, 1985. Rolfe was buried at Arlington National Cemetery, Section 3, Site 1829-B.

== Family ==
In 1917, Rolfe married Nan Elizabeth Belles of New Brighton, Pennsylvania. They were the parents of a daughter, Ann Sherburne Rolfe, who became the wife of Brigadier General Charles A. Symroski.

== Sources ==
=== Books ===
- Cullum, George W.; Robinson, Wirt (1920). Biographical Register of the Officers and Graduates of the U.S. Military Academy. Vol. VI B. Saginaw & Peters: Seeman & Peters. p. 1956.
- Empric, Bruce E. (2024), Uncommon Allies: U.S. Army Recipients of Soviet Military Decorations in World War II, Teufelsberg Press, p. 106, ISBN 979-8-3444-6807-5
- Poulos, Terrence (2004). Extreme War: The Biggest, Best, Bloodiest, and Worst in Warfare. New York: Citadel Press. p. 386. ISBN 978-0-8065-2730-7.
- Rottman, Gordon L. (2012). US 10th Mountain Division in World War II. Oxford, United Kingdom: Osprey Publishing. p. 11. ISBN 978-1-84908-808-4.
- Rusiecki, Stephen M. (2010). In Final Defense of the Reich: The Destruction of the 6th SS Mountain Division "Nord". Annapolis, MD: Naval Institute Press. p. 327. ISBN 978-1-59114-744-2.
- Trinkner, Charles L. (1966). Florida Lives: The Sunshine State Who's Who, a Reference Edition Recording the Biographies of Contemporary Leaders in Florida. Hopkinsville, KY: Historical Record Association. p. 454.
- United States Army Command and General Staff College (1936). Annual Report (PDF). Ft. Leavenworth, KS: Command and General Staff School Press. p. 5. Archived from the original (PDF) on September 11, 2015.
- Wilson, John B. (1999). Army Lineage Series: Armies, Corps, Divisions and Separate Brigades. Washington, DC: US Government Printing Office. p. 409. ISBN 978-0-16-049992-0.
- Witte, David R. (2015). World War II at Camp Hale: Blazing a New Trail in the Rockies. Charleston, SC: History Press. p. 212. ISBN 978-1-46711-854-5.

=== Newspapers ===
- "Casualty List: Wounded Slightly". Reading Times. Reading, PA. American Expeditionary Forces. February 13, 1919. p. 6 – via Newspapers.com.
- "Names Commander". Reno Gazette-Journal. Reno, NV. Associated Press. September 15, 1952. p. 13 – via Newspapers.com.
- "Ski Soldiers Train in Pikes Peak Region". Wilmington Journal. Wilmington, DE. International News Service. January 11, 1943. p. 9 – via Newspapers.com.

=== Internet ===
- Arlington National Cemetery. "Burial Record, Onslow S. Rolfe". arlingtoncemetery.mil/. Arlington, VA: U.S. Army.
- Center of Military History. "Combat Chronicle, 71st Infantry Division". history.army.mil/. Washington, DC: US Army Center of Military History. Archived from the original on April 26, 2016.
- Metropolitan State University. "Camp Hale History". msudenver.edu/. Denver, CO: Metropolitan State University of Denver. Archived from the original on March 3, 2016.
- Military Times. "Awards and Citations, Onslow Sherburne Rolfe". Hall of Valor. Springfield, VA: Military Times. Archived from the original on October 2, 2016.
- Symroski, Charles A. "Obituary, Onslow S. Rolfe, 1917". westpointaog.org/. West Point, NY: West Point Association of Graduates. Archived from the original on October 1, 2016.
- Generals of World War II
