= 66th Regiment =

66th Regiment may refer to:

- 66th (Berkshire) Regiment of Foot, an infantry unit of the British Army
- 66th (Leeds Rifles) (West Yorkshire Regiment) Heavy Anti-Aircraft Regiment, Royal Artillery, British Army
- 66th Punjabis, a unit of the British Indian Army
- 66th Infantry Regiment (United States), a unit of the United States Army
- 66th Armor Regiment, an armoured unit of the United States Army
- 66th Armoured Regiment (India), an armoured unit of the Indian Army
- 66th Infantry Regiment (Imperial Japanese Army), Empire of Japan
- 66th Infantry Regiment (USAFIP-NL), part of United States Army Forces in the Philippines – Northern Luzon

== American Civil War regiments ==
- 66th Indiana Infantry Regiment, Union Army
- 66th Illinois Infantry Regiment, Union Army
- 66th New York Infantry Regiment, Union Army
- 66th Ohio Infantry Regiment, Union Army

== See also ==
- 66th Infantry Regiment (disambiguation)
- 66th Division (disambiguation)
