= 66th Brigade (China) =

- 空军航空兵第六十六旅
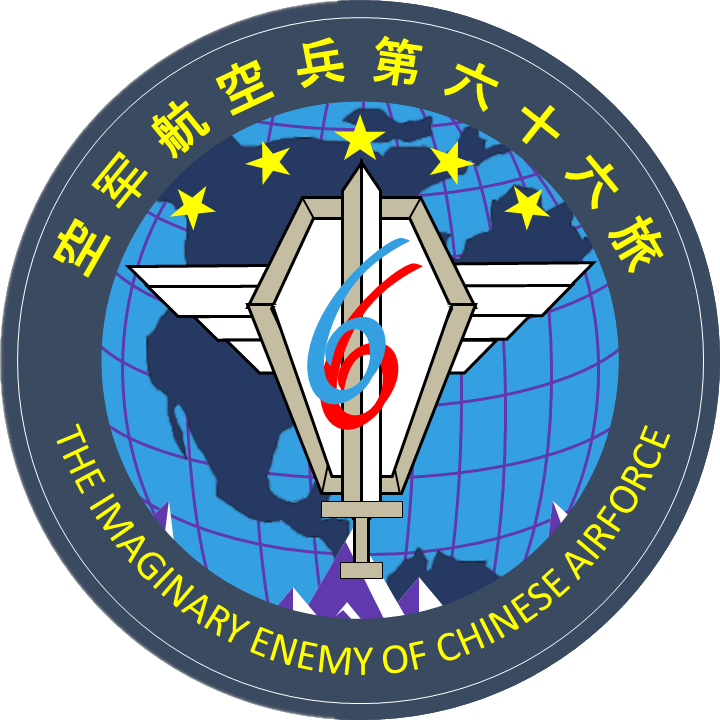
- Unit patch of the 66th Brigade
- Active: 2014–present
- Country: People's Republic of China
- Branch: People's Liberation Army Air Force
- Type: Fighter
- Role: Aggressor
- Garrison/HQ: Cangxian, Hebei, China
- Nicknames: Blue Brigade, 66th OPFOR Brigade, 177th Brigade
- Mottos: 像敌人那样思考 "Think and fly like the enemy"

Aircraft flown
- Fighter: Su-30MKK, J-10, J-11

The 66th Brigade (Chinese: 空军航空兵第六十六旅; pinyin: Kōngjūn Hángkōngbīng Dì Liùshíliù Lǚ) s an air formation of the People's Republic of China (PRC). The 66th Brigade serves as an aggressor unit designed to simulate adversarial air combat forces in training. Appearing to be the only such opposing force (OPFOR) unit of the Chinese People's Liberation Army Air Force (PLAAF), the unit can be compared to the aggressor squadrons of the United States and Canada. The unit is garrisoned at Cangxian Air Base in Hebei Province and reports to the Air Force Flight Test and Evaluation Center, itself subordinate to the Air Force Flight Test and Training Base (FTTB).

Although the United States and NATO militaries depict friendly forces in blue and their adversaries in red, their principal opponents, the Russian and Chinese militaries, depict friendly forces in red and those of their adversaries (such as NATO) in blue. It is for this reason that the PLA refers to the 66th Brigade, simulating the air forces of the PRC's adversaries, as the "Blue Brigade".

== Activities ==
The 66th Air Brigade has been described as a "full-time ace" unit comprising the most skilled pilots in the PLAAF including a number of Golden Helmet awardees. The unit researches and studies adversary use of fighter aircraft, rotorcraft, and electronic warfare for use in training against PLAAF units. Certain tactics reported to be employed by the 66th Brigade including electromagnetic attacks to interfere with PLAAF aircraft and traversing valleys near ground-level before kicking up to target air defense positions in exercises such as Firepower in Shandan, to the alleged shock of PLAAF air defense units. Although its patch suggests the United States is the PLAAF's primary adversary, the brigade has also played the role of adversarial air forces from Taiwan, Indochina, and India.

The 66th Brigade appears to operate a number of Sukhoi Su-30MKK, Chengdu J-10A, and Shenyang J-11B fighter aircraft, while the most modern Chinese fighter aircraft such as the Chengdu J-20 and Shenyang J-16 are still being fielded to combat units. It is expected that these advanced fighters will be operated by the 66th as more are produced and issued to regular combat units. Aircraft of the 66th Brigade bear tail numbers fitting the pattern 78x7x.

Originally, the 66th Brigade had only taken part in domestic training against units of the Chinese PLAAF. It wasn't until the 2017 annual Shaheen-6 (Eagle-6) multinational exercise between the Chinese and Pakistani Air Forces that the 66th Brigade would participate in training with foreign units. This first is recognized as an indicator of the levels of trust and cooperation between the two Asian nations' militaries.

== Insignia ==
The 66th Brigade's patch features several subliminal design themes including the trails of two aircraft, one red and one blue, circling to form two sixes, a nod to the unit's name. The patch's background, centrally focused on the continental United States, suggests the unit views the U.S. Air Force as its chief adversary from which the unit studies its tactics. The top of the patch features the unit's name in Chinese characters with the English "THE IMAGINARY ENEMY OF THE CHINESE AIRFORCE" emblazoned on a scroll spread across the patch's base.

== See also ==
- Aggressor squadrons
- Opposing force
- 195th Combined Arms Brigade (PLAGF)
