= 66th Infantry Regiment (United States) =

- Active: 1943–1946
- Country: United States
- Branch: United States Army
- Type: Infantry
- Size: Regiment
- Motto: None

The 66th Infantry Regiment is an infantry regiment in the United States Army.

== History ==
For a brief period (1932–1940), the 66th Armored Regiment was designated as the 66th Infantry Regiment. The second iteration of the 66th Infantry Regiment was not descended from this organization.

== Lineage ==
The regiment was constituted 10 July 1943 in the Regular Army as the 66th Infantry and assigned to the 71st Infantry Division. It was activated 15 July 1943 at Camp Carson, Colorado and deactivated 5–9 April 1946 at Camp Kilmer, New Jersey. It was relieved from the 71st Division and allotted to the Regular Army 25 February 1953. It has since broken up and its elements re-designated as elements of the 13th Armored Division as follows:

- 66th Infantry (less 1st, 2nd, and 3rd Battalions) as the 266th Armored Infantry Battalion.
- 1st Battalion as the 267th Armored Infantry Battalion
- 2nd Battalion as the 268th Armored Infantry Battalion
- 3rd Battalion as the 269th Armored Infantry Battalion

== Campaign streamers ==
World War II

- Rhineland
- Central Europe
