= 34th Armor Regiment =

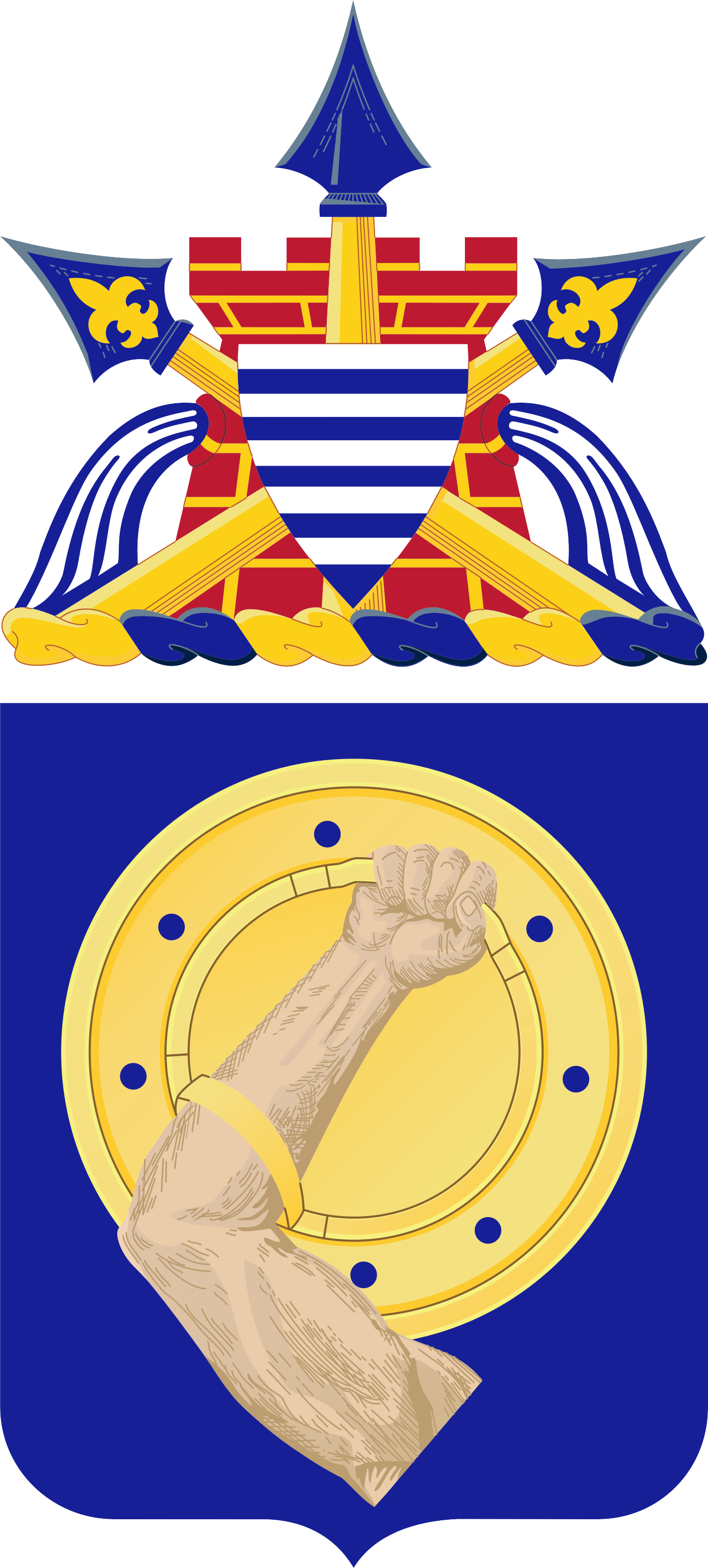
- Coat of arms
- Founded: 28 August 1941
- Country: United States
- Branch: United States Army
- Type: Armored battalion
- Role: Armored warfare
- Size: 1 active battalion
- Part of: U.S. Army Armored Branch
- Garrison/HQ: Fort Riley
- Nicknames: Centurions (special designation); Dreadnaughts
- Mottos: "Fear God, Dreadnaught!"
- Colors: Blue & Gold
- Engagements: World War II; Cold War; Vietnam War; Operation Cedar Falls; Operation Junction City; Battle of Suoi Tre; Operation Baker; Operation Yellowstone; Operation Saratoga; Cambodian campaign; Gulf War; Iraq War; Operation Atlantic Resolve
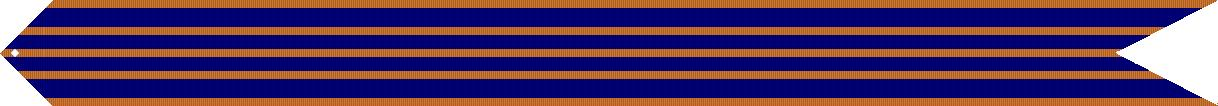
- Decorations: Presidential Unit Citation (2x); Valorous Unit Award (3x); Meritorious Unit Commendation; Superior Unit Award (2x); Luxembourg War Cross; Vietnam Gallantry Cross (3x); Vietnam Civil Actions Medal (2x)

Commanders
- Current commander: LTC Olsen (2-34 AR)

Insignia
- Distinctive Unit Insignia

The 34th Armor Regiment is an armored regiment of the United States Army formed in 1941. It served with the 5th Armored Division and the 44th Infantry Division during World War II, the 4th Infantry Division, 1st Cavalry Division, and the 25th Infantry Division (United States) during the Vietnam War. The current active unit is 2nd Battalion, 34th Armor Regiment (2-34 AR), assigned to the 1st Infantry Division at Fort Riley, Kansas, since 1987.

In service for 85 years as of August 2026, the "Dreadnaughts" have been cited for heroism in combat on numerous occasions, including two Presidential Unit Citations, three Valorous Unit Awards, and the Vietnam Gallantry Cross. The Luxembourg War Cross was awarded for the 34th's part in liberating Luxembourg from German occupation in 1944, and the colors of the cross's ribbon feature in the regimental coat of arms.

== History ==
=== 1st Battalion ===
The 1st Battalion, 34th Armor was constituted in the Regular Army on 28 August 1941 as Company A, 34th Armor Regiment. The unit was activated shortly thereafter on 1 October 1941 at Fort Knox, Kentucky, as an element of the 5th Armored Division. During World War II, the 1st Battalion, 34th Armor Regiment was relieved from the 5th Armor Division, reorganized and re-designated as the 772nd Tank Battalion before being sent to Europe. Arriving at Le Havre, France in February 1945, it participated in the Rhineland and Central Europe Campaigns. Simultaneously, 2nd Battalion was reformed as the new 34th Armor Regiment, and 3rd Battalion became the 10th Armored Regiment.

In March 1945, 772nd Battalion was attached to the 44th Infantry Division only days before crossing the Rhine River south of Worms, Germany. The battalion then led the attack of the 44th Infantry Division, which seized the city of Mannheim, an industrial, and transportation center. In April and May 1945, with the war fast approaching an end, the 772nd Tank Battalion moved rapidly across Germany into Austria, again leading the 44th Infantry Division. In Austria, the battalion's final combat mission was highlighted by the surrender of the 19th German Army.

After the end of World War II, the battalion was inactivated on 14 November 1945 at Camp Shelby, Mississippi. It was redesignated on 16 January 1947 as Company A, 306th Tank Battalion. Assigned to the Sixth Army, and allotted to the Army Reserves, the battalion was activated on 25 June 1947 at Seattle, Washington where the unit remained until 1965. In May 1949, Company A was reorganized and redesignated as Company A, 306th Heavy Tank Battalion before being deactivated again on 15 September 1950. The unit was completely disbanded on 20 February 1952.

It was reconstituted and redesignated as Company A, 34th Armor in March 1957, the unit was withdrawn from the Army Reserve and re-allotted to the Regular Army. In April of the same year, the unit was redesignated as Headquarters and Headquarters Company, 1st Medium Tank Battalion, 34th Armor, concurrently assigned to the 4th Infantry Division and reactivated at Fort Lewis, Washington.

It was again reorganized and redesignated on 1 October 1963 as the 1st Battalion, 34th Armor and again inactivated on 14 October 1965 at Fort Lewis, Washington, and relieved from assignment to the 4th Infantry Division.

The 1st Battalion, 34th Armor was reactivated at Fort Riley, Kansas on 1 August 1979 and assigned to the 1st Infantry Division (United States), the "Big Red One." From 1980 to 1990 the Centurion Battalion participated in numerous field-training exercises to include 4 REFORGER trips to Germany, and 4 deployments to the National Training Center in California. In December 1990, the battalion deployed to Operation Desert Shield in Saudi Arabia. During Operation Desert Storm, the battalion was the Brigade Assault Force for the breach of Iraqi defenses, and led the 1st Brigade in the night attack against the Tawakalna Division of the Republican Guard, and was the first unit in the Devil Brigade to enter Kuwait.

The battalion deployed to Kuwait in 2003 in support of Operation Iraqi Freedom as the first unit from 1st Brigade, 1st Infantry Division (Mechanized) to enter that theater of operations. On 7 September 2003, Task Force 1-34th Armor was assigned to the Multi-National Force Iraq and assigned to the Multi-National Division Central. Elements of 1-34th Armor served in Habbaniyah and Ramadi in the Al Anbar province under the 82nd Airborne and 1st Marine Divisions. In Iraq, Task Force 1-34th encountered the beginning of the insurgency in Al Anbar performing full spectrum operations. The task force's missions included tasks such as renovating schools, helping build a local political structure, and simultaneously closing with and destroying the enemy.

1-34th Armor returned from Iraq in 2004. It subsequently participated in a mission readiness exercise at the Joint Readiness Training Center at Fort Polk, LA for a possible redeployment to Iraq. However, in 2006 the mission of the 1st Brigade, 1st Infantry Division changed to one of training units for deployment to Afghanistan and Iraq, as well as providing small security forces (SECFOR) elements.

=== 2nd Battalion ===
The 2nd Battalion was deployed from Fort Irwin, California to South Vietnam in September 1966. During the Vietnam War, Company C, 2-34 AR was a tank company; "Charlie" Company now acts as a scout and mechanized infantry company and fields the Bradley Fighting Vehicle alongside the heavy armor employed by the rest of 2-34's "line" companies.

During its service in Vietnam, Company B, 2-34 AR, was cited on 8 April 1969 under Army General Orders No. 21, for heroism and awarded the Vietnam Gallantry Cross with Palm by the government of South Vietnam, for actions from 12 July 1965 to 16 October 1968. The rest of 2nd Battalion was also cited on the same orders, and awarded the Gallantry Cross with Palm for actions from December 1965 to August 1968. 2nd Battalion (excluding Company B) was awarded the Gallantry Cross with Palm again, cited on 14 October 1971 under HQDA General Orders No. 48, for service during October 1966-1 August 1967.

2-34 Armor would altogether be awarded the Gallantry Cross with Palm a total of 4 times for its Vietnam service, with the specific award to Company B counted separately, and while the Civil Action Honor Medal, First Class was presented to Headquarters & Headquarters Company and Company A, and to 2-34 Armor as a whole on a separate occasion. Additionally, on 19 March 1974, HDQA General Orders No. 8 specified that all units which had served in Vietnam were authorized to wear the Gallantry Cross with Palm.

It was during their Vietnam War service that 2-34 earned the "Dreadnaughts" name. Given by the 1st Infantry Division commander, Major General William E. DePuy, in response to a situation in 1966 wherein 34 of the battalion's tanks became stuck amidst a Vietnamese monsoon. 2-34 managed to get every one of their tanks freed before nightfall, to which General DePuy called them "Dreadnaughts," meaning they could do the impossible and feared nothing. The Dreadnaughts went on to be sent out on numerous assignments where armored forces were needed, including Operations Cedar Falls, Junction City, Baker, Yellowstone, and Saratoga. A Valorous Unit Citation was awarded for 2-34's service during the Operation Fish Hook in 1970 (part of the Cambodian campaign).

After returning from Vietnam to Fort Carson in December 1970, 2-34 Armor exchanged the M48A3 Patton tank for the M60. The M60A3 remained in use until it was replaced by the M1 Abrams in 1989, which has remained the mainstay of 2-34's tank companies for nearly 40 years as of 2026.

After 17 continuous years with the "Ivy Division," 2-34 Armor departed Fort Carson and the 4th Infantry Division on 14 July 1987, and was reassigned to the 1st Infantry Division at Fort Riley effective 16 August 1987. 2-34 deployed on 1 January 1991 in support of Operation Desert Shield, and participated in Operation Desert Saber in February 1991.

During the Global War on Terrorism, 2-34 deployed twice; the first was with 1st Brigade, 1st Infantry Division, during the invasion and initial post-war occupation of Iraq in March–December 2003. The second was with the 3rd Brigade Combat Team, 3rd Infantry Division in another deployment to Iraq, this time in January 2005 – 2006.

2-34th Armor is currently assigned to the 1st Armored Brigade Combat Team, 1st Infantry Division, stationed at Fort Riley, Kansas.

==== Current organization ====
The current makeup of the 2nd Battalion, 34th Armor Regiment is as follows:

- Company A- M1 Abrams
- Company B- M1 Abrams
- Company C- Bradley Fighting Vehicle
- Forward Support Company
- Headquarters & Headquarters Company

=== 3rd Battalion ===
Assigned to the 5th Armored Division in 1943, under the name of the 10th Tank Battalion, 3rd Battalion was cited by the Provisional Government of France on 15 July 1946 for exemplary heroism during 14–20 September 1944 as part of the 5th Armored Division's Combat Command R. Awarded the Croix de Guerre with silver star, Combat Command R was referred to in the citation as "A group of units inspired by a fierce will to conquer."

=== 4th Battalion ===
4th Battalion (4-34 Armor) deployed to Saudi Arabia with the 8th Infantry Division in support of Operations Desert Shield & Desert Storm, from 4 January to 8 May 1991. Upon its return to Germany, 4th Battalion was deactivated.

== Lineage ==
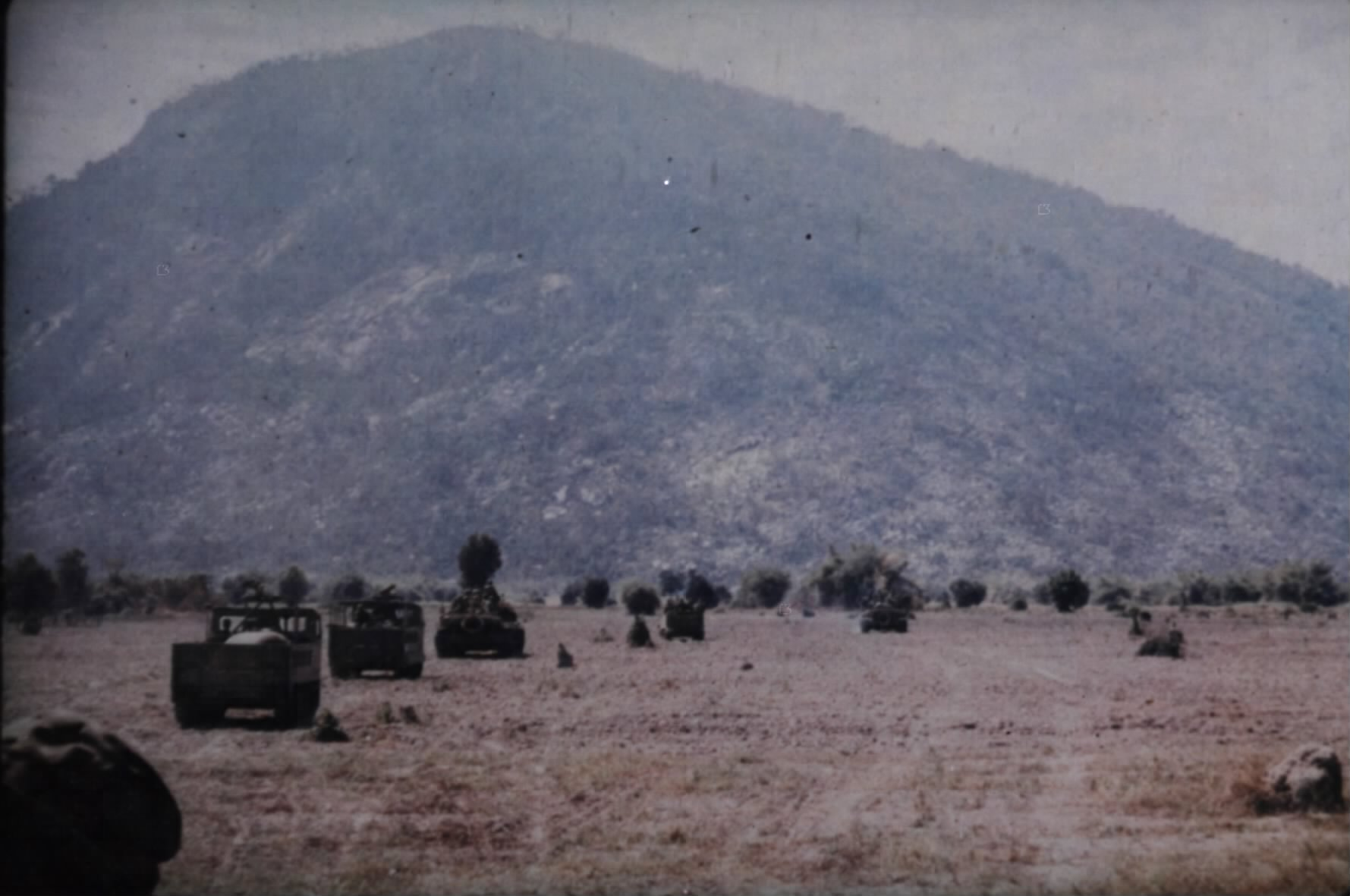
M548 cargo carriers and M48 tanks from Headquarters Company, 2nd Squadron, 34th Armor, 25th Infantry Division, head for a night defensive position at the base of Nui Ba Den Mountain, February 1970.

Constituted 28 August 1941 in the Regular Army as the 34th Armored Regiment and assigned to the 5th Armored Division

Activated 1 October 1941 at Fort Knox, Kentucky

Regiment broken up 20 September 1943 and its elements reorganized and redesignated as follows:

- Headquarters and Headquarters Company and 2d Battalion as the 34th Tank Battalion, and remained assigned to the 5th Armored Division
- 1st Battalion as the 772d Tank Battalion, and relieved from assignment to the 5th Armored Division
- 3d Battalion as the 10th Tank Battalion, and remained assigned to the 5th Armored Division
- Reconnaissance Company as Troop D, 85th Cavalry Reconnaissance Squadron, Mechanized, an element of the 5th Armored Division
- Maintenance and Service Companies disbanded

After 20 September 1943 the above units underwent changes as follows:

34th Tank Battalion

- 34th Tank Battalion inactivated 8 October 1945 at Camp Myles Standish, Massachusetts
- Redesignated 18 June 1948 as the 34th Medium Tank Battalion
- Activated 6 July 1948 at Camp Chaffee, Arkansas
- Inactivated 1 February 1950 at Camp Chaffee, Arkansas
- Activated 1 September 1950 at Camp Chaffee, Arkansas
- Inactivated 16 March 1956 at Camp Chaffee, Arkansas
- Relieved 27 March 1957 from assignment to the 5th Armored Division

772d Tank Battalion

- 772d Tank Battalion inactivated 14 November 1945 at Camp Shelby, Mississippi
- Withdrawn 16 January 1947 from the Regular Army, redesignated as the 306th Tank Battalion, and allotted to the Organized Reserves
- Headquarters and Headquarters Company activated 5 February 1947 at Seattle, Washington (remainder of battalion activated 25 June 1947)
- (Organized Reserves redesignated 25 March 1948 as the Organized Reserve Corps; redesignated 9 July 1952 as the Army Reserve)
- Reorganized and redesignated 2 May 1949 as the 306th Heavy Tank Battalion
- Inactivated 15 September 1950 at Seattle, Washington
- Disbanded 20 February 1952
- Reconstituted 27 March 1957 in the Regular Army as the 306th Heavy Tank Battalion

10th Tank Battalion

- 10th Tank Battalion inactivated 9 October 1945 at Camp Myles Standish, Massachusetts
- Redesignated 18 June 1948 as the 10th Medium Tank Battalion
- Activated 6 July 1948 at Camp Chaffee, Arkansas
- Inactivated 1 February 1950 at Camp Chaffee, Arkansas
- Activated 1 September 1950 at Camp Chaffee, Arkansas
- Inactivated 16 March 1956 at Camp Chaffee, Arkansas
- Relieved 27 March 1957 from assignment to the 5th Armored Division

Troop D, 85th Cavalry Reconnaissance Squadron, Mechanized

- Troop D, 85th Cavalry Reconnaissance Squadron, Mechanized, redesignated 25 August 1945 as Troop D, 85th Mechanized Cavalry Reconnaissance Squadron
- Inactivated 11 October 1945 at Camp Kilmer, New Jersey
- Redesignated 18 June 1948 as Company D, 85th Reconnaissance Battalion
- Activated 6 July 1948 at Camp Chaffee, Arkansas
- Inactivated 1 February 1950 at Camp Chaffee, Arkansas
- Activated 1 September 1950 at Camp Chaffee, Arkansas
- Inactivated 16 March 1956 at Camp Chaffee, Arkansas

Maintenance and Service Companies, 34th Armored Regiment

- Maintenance and Service Companies, 34th Armored Regiment, reconstituted 27 March 1957 in the Regular Army

34th and 10th Medium Tank Battalions; 306th Heavy Tank Battalion; Company D, 85th Reconnaissance Battalion; and Maintenance and Service Companies, 34th Armored Regiment, consolidated, reorganized, and redesignated 27 March 1957 as the 34th Armor, a parent regiment under the Combat Arms Regimental System

Withdrawn 16 February 1988 from the Combat Arms Regimental System and reorganized under the United States Army Regimental System

== Distinctive unit insignia ==
- Description

A Gold color metal and enamel device 1 5/32 inches (2.94 cm) in height overall consisting of a shield blazoned: Azure, an arm embowed Proper and couped at the shoulder raised and armed with a buckler Or having seven rivets of the field three and four.

- Symbolism

The buckler represents the armored protective device. The arm embowed is raised in the attitude of striking.

- Background

The distinctive unit insignia was originally approved for the 34th Armored Regiment (Light) on 10 December 1941. It was redesignated for the 34th Armored Regiment on 26 March 1942. The insignia was redesignated for the 34th Tank Battalion on 10 November 1943. It was redesignated for the 34th Medium Tank Battalion on 29 March 1954. It was redesignated for the 34th Armor Regiment on 20 January 1958.

== Coat of arms ==
=== Blazon ===
- Shield

Azure, an arm embowed Proper and couped at the shoulder raised and armed with a buckler Or having seven rivets of the field three and four.

- Crest

On a wreath Or and Azure, in front of a tower Gules masoned of the first and emitting from each side a stream of water of the second, three spears one in pale and two in saltire with shafts of the first and points of the second those points in saltire each charged with a fleur-de-lis of the first, over all in pale an escutcheon barry of ten Argent and of the second. Motto THE STRONG ARM FOR VICTORY.

- Symbolism
- Shield

The buckler represents the armored protective device. The arm embowed is raised in the attitude of striking.

- Crest

The red tower gushing water to each side alludes to the bitter campaign to secure the dams of the Roer River, for which the Regiment received a Distinguished Unit Citation. The spears refer to the unit's push through Normandy, Northern France and Germany. The shield, bearing a part of the arms of Luxembourg, represents the award of the Luxembourg Croix de Guerre for participation in the liberation of that state.

- Background

The coat of arms was originally approved for the 34th Armored Regiment (Light) on 10 December 1941. It was redesignated for the 34th Armored Regiment on 26 March 1942. It was redesignated for the 34th Tank Battalion on 10 November 1943. The insignia was redesignated for the 34th Medium Tank Battalion on 29 March 1954. It was redesignated for the 34th Armor Regiment on 20 January 1958. The insignia was amended to add a crest on 9 June 1964.

== Campaign participation credit ==
World War II: Normandy; Northern France; Rhineland; Ardennes-Alsace; Central Europe

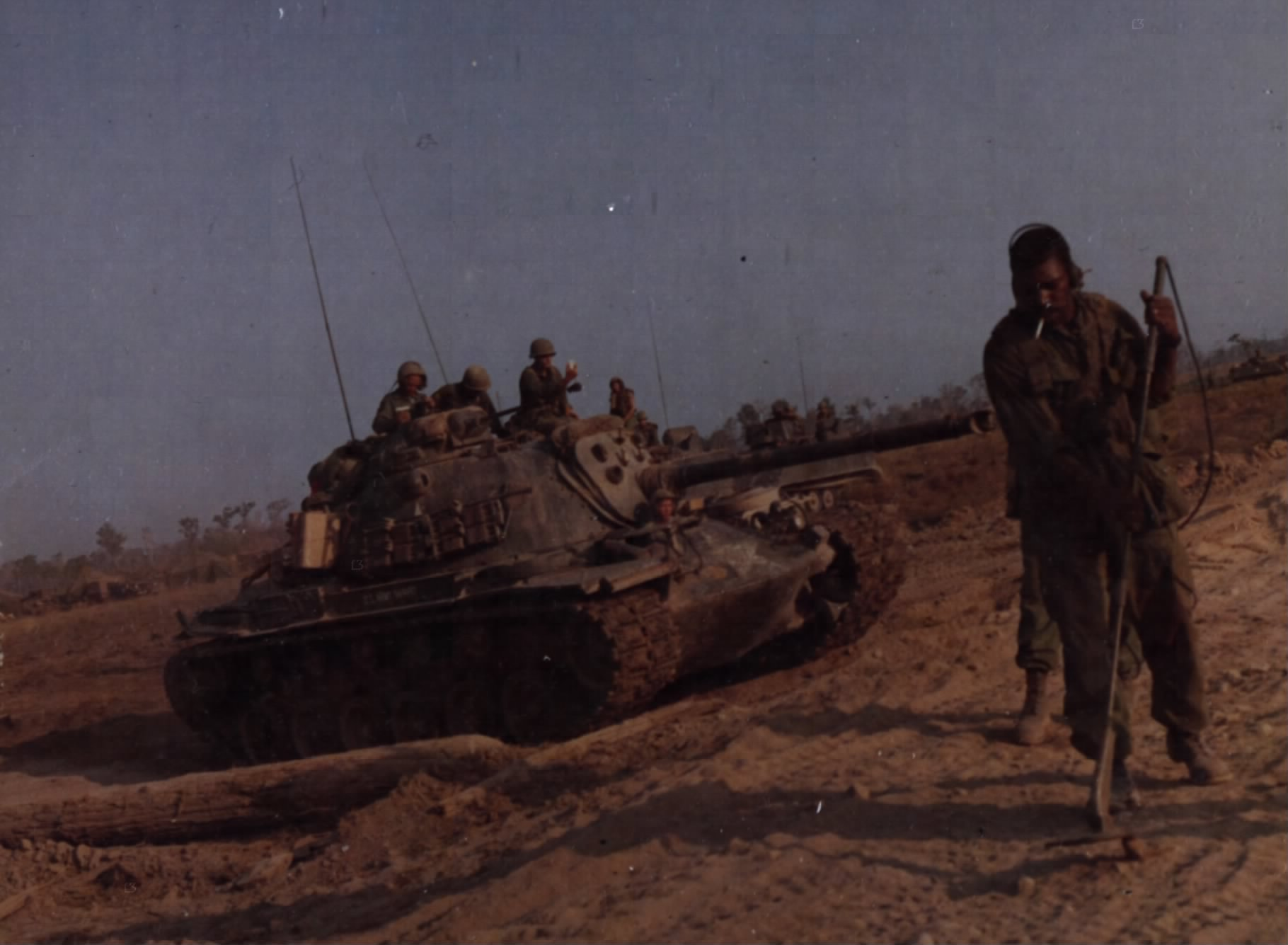
Men of "C" Company, 2nd Battalion, 34th Armor Regiment use mine-sweeping equipment to clear a road as an M43A3 tank stands guard, 19 March 1967

Vietnam': Counteroffensive, Phase II; Counteroffensive, Phase III; Tet Counteroffensive; Counteroffensive, Phase IV; Counteroffensive, Phase V; Counteroffensive, Phase VI; Tet 69/Counteroffensive; Summer-Fall 1969; Winter-Spring 1970; Sanctuary Counteroffensive; Counteroffensive, Phase VII

Southwest Asia: Defense of Saudi Arabia; Liberation and Defense of Kuwait; Cease-Fire Southwest Aisa: Operation Iraq Freedom based out of Forward Operating Base Gabe, Baqubah 2005–2006

== Decorations ==
- Presidential Unit Citation (Army), Streamer embroidered ROER RIVER DAMS
- Presidential Unit Citation (Army), Streamer embroidered SUOI TRE, VIETNAM
- Valorous Unit Award, Streamer embroidered FISH HOOK
- Valorous Unit Award, Streamer embroidered IRAQ
- Valorous Unit Award, Streamer embroidered IRAQ-KUWAIT
- Meritorious Unit Commendation (2014–2015)
- Army Superior Unit Award (2006–2009)
- Luxembourg Croix de Guerre, Streamer embroidered LUXEMBOURG
- Republic of Vietnam Cross of Gallantry with Palm for VIETNAM 1965-1968
- Republic of Vietnam Cross of Gallantry with Palm for VIETNAM 1966-1967
- Republic of Vietnam Civil Actions Medal, First Class for VIETNAM 1967-1970

== See also ==
- List of armored and cavalry regiments of the United States Army
