= Lunsford E. Oliver =

United States Army general

Lunsford Errett Oliver
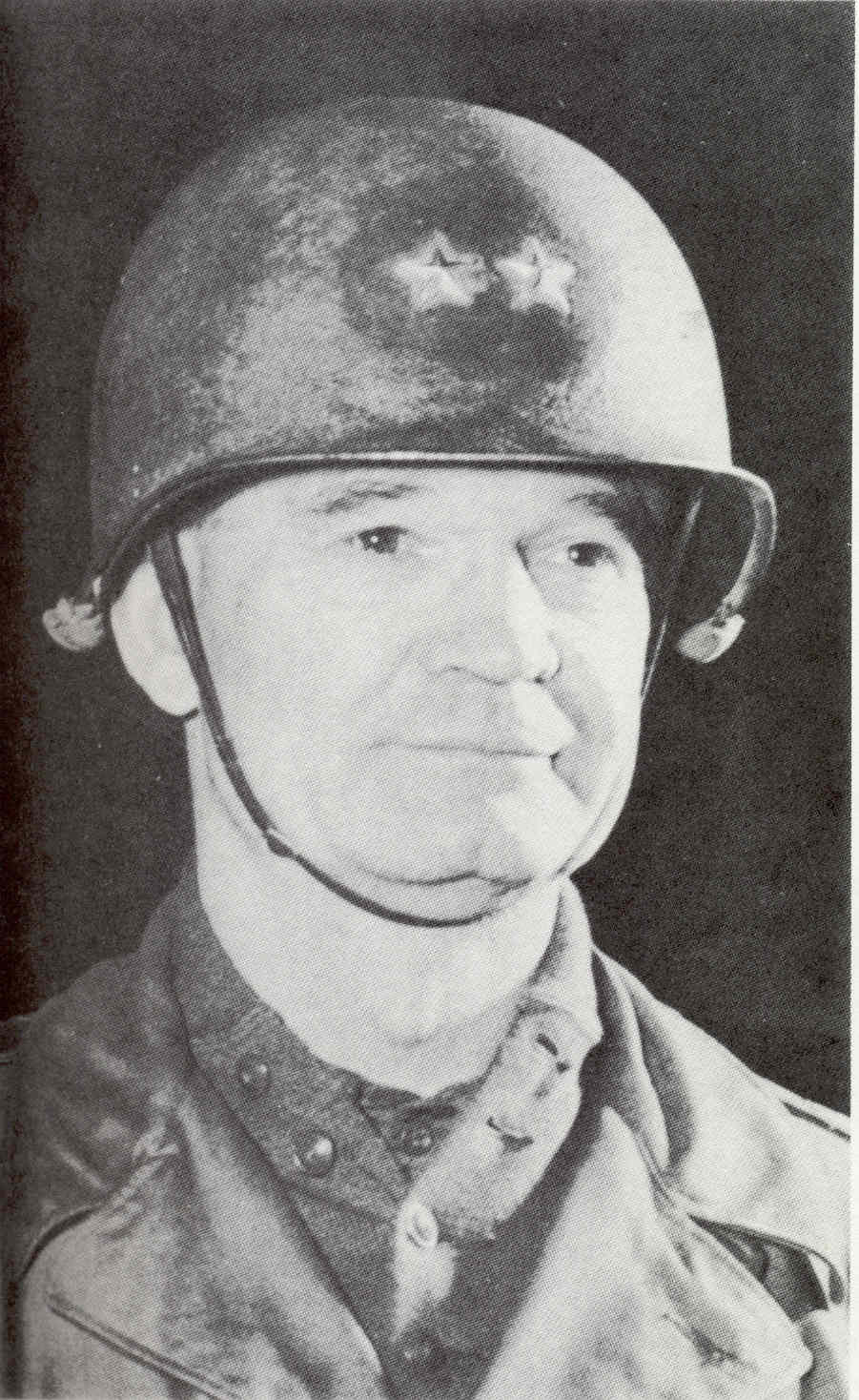
- Born: March 17, 1889; Nemaha, Nebraska, United States
- Died: October 13, 1978 (aged 89); Newington, Connecticut, United States
- Burial place: West Point Cemetery
- Military career
- Allegiance: United States
- Branch: United States Army
- Service years: 1913–1948
- Rank: Major General
- Nickname: "Bug"
- Service number: 0-3536
- Unit: Corps of Engineers
- Commands: 2nd Engineer Battalion; 36th Engineer Battalion; 29th Engineer Battalion; 5th Armored Division
- Conflicts: Pancho Villa Expedition; World War I World War II
- Awards: Army Distinguished Service Medal (2); Legion of Merit (2); Silver Star; Bronze Star (3)

Major General Lunsford Errett Oliver (March 17, 1889 – October 13, 1978) was a senior United States Army officer, who commanded the 5th Armored Division during World War II.

== Early life and military career ==
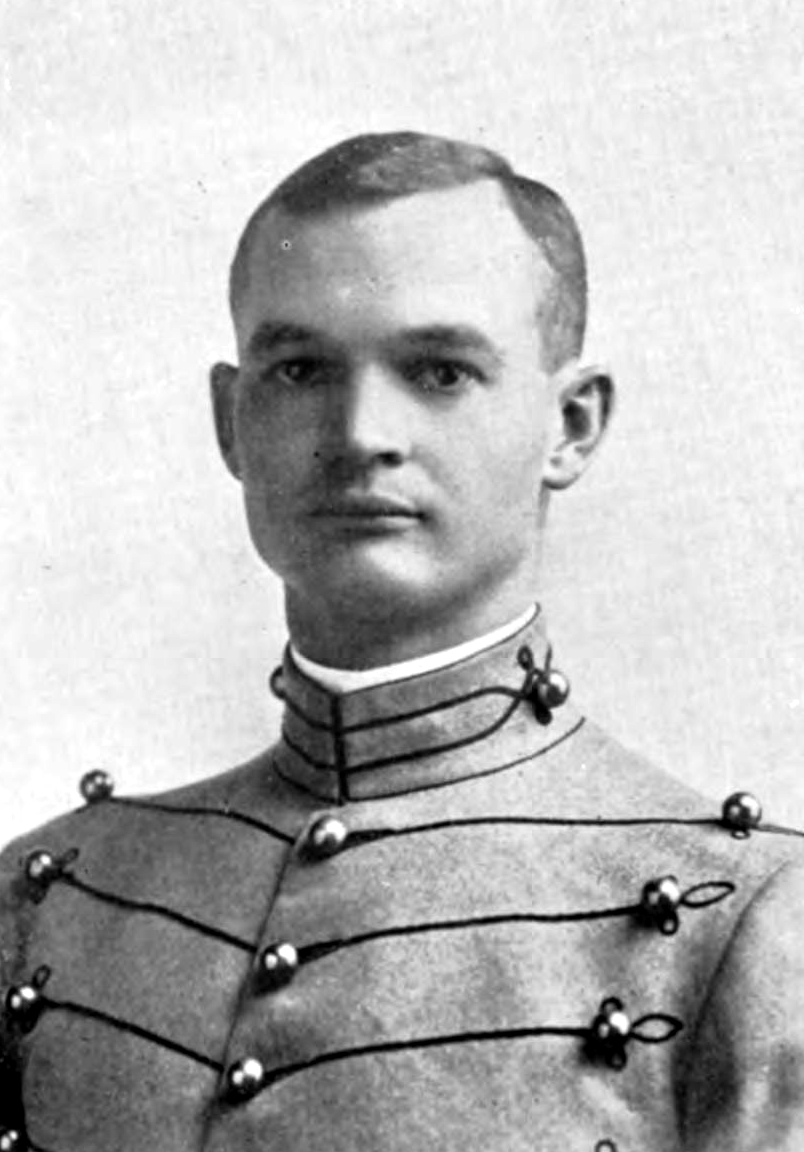
At West Point in 1913

Lunsford Errett Oliver was born on March 17, 1889, in Nemaha, Nebraska, the son of Thomas Jefferson Oliver and Mary Lorraine Evans. In 1909 he attended the United States Military Academy (USMA) at West Point, New York, and graduated on June 12, 1913. Subsequently he was commissioned into the Corps of Engineers of the United States Army as a second lieutenant.

Oliver's first assignment was at Fort Brown, Texas, on border patrol duty as a supply officer during the Pancho Villa Expedition. He was appointed to the U.S. Army Engineer School in Washington, D.C., for further military education and graduated on March 31, 1916. He then served with the 1st Engineer Battalion at Washington Barracks, before he was transferred to Fort Oglethorpe, Georgia. Oliver stayed on active service during World War I, organizing and training railway engineer battalions. He did not, however, serve overseas during the war and remained in the United States, where he briefly commanded the 2nd Engineer Battalion.

== Between the wars ==
After the war, he contributed to the Mississippi River Flood Control Project. and then between years 1924–1927 served as an engineer in Alaska Road Commission, which was responsible for the construction of many important Alaska highways. In 1928, he attended the U.S. Army Command and General Staff School at Fort Leavenworth, Kansas, for further military education.

During the years 1933–1937, Oliver served as a District Engineer in Vicksburg, Mississippi, and in 1938, he attended the U.S. Army War College in Carlisle, Pennsylvania. After his War College studies, Oliver was assigned as an instructor to the U.S. Army Command and General Staff School at Fort Leavenworth, Kansas. He served in this capacity until 1940, when he was assigned as the Armored Force Engineer at Fort Knox, Kentucky. While there, Oliver, now promoted to colonel, initiated the research that led to the development of the steel treadway bridge.

== World War II ==
Oliver was assigned to the 1st Armored Division in January 1942, a month after the Japanese attack on Pearl Harbor and the subsequent American entry into World War II, to assume command of Combat Command 'B' (CCB), then promoted to the one-star general officer rank of brigadier general on February 16, 1942. The division deployed to Northern Ireland on May 6, 1942, to train for eventual operations in French North Africa.

In September, Oliver went to London, England to assist in the planning for Operation Torch (Allied invasion of North Africa). Oliver was promoted to the two-star rank of major general on November 20, 1942, then CCB under his command landed successfully near the city of Oran on November 8, 1942, and started to advance toward the Tafaraoui airfield, occupying it with little resistance that same day. He was awarded the Army Distinguished Service Medal. CCB encountered its first major enemy resistance at Medjez-el-bab, Tunisia where they fought for fours days starting on December 6, 1942.

Oliver returned to the United States and was appointed commander of the 5th Armored Division, where he succeeded Brigadier General Sereno E. Brett at Camp Cooke in early 1943. Oliver led the division throughout the remainder of the war, including training in the Mojave Desert near Needles, California, through March 1943, the Tennessee Maneuvers through the Summer, and final validation and reorganization of the division at Pine Camp (Now Fort Drum, New York) through the winter into early 1944.

Oliver led the division on two ships to England, arriving on February 24, 1944, in preparation for the Allied invasion of Normandy. The division served on the Western Front starting with landing on Utah Beach on July 26, 1944, until Victory in Europe Day on May 8, 1945, and after. The 5th Armored Division, under Major General Oliver's command, was the first division to reach the Seine River, the first division to reach Luxembourg, the first division to fight in Germany, and when halted by orders from the U.S. Ninth Army, the division sat 45 miles from Berlin, closer than any other American division.

A street in Luxembourg City is named in honour of Major General Lunsford E. Oliver.

He died in Newington, Connecticut, on October 13, 1978, and was buried at West Point Cemetery.

== Decorations ==
Major General Lunsford E. Oliver's ribbon bar:

1st Row	Army Distinguished Service Medal with Oak Leaf Cluster			
2nd Row	Silver Star	Legion of Merit with Oak Leaf Cluster	Bronze Star with two Oak Leaf Clusters	Mexican Border Service Medal
3rd Row	World War I Victory Medal	Army of Occupation of Germany Medal	American Defense Service Medal	American Campaign Medal
4th Row	European–African–Middle Eastern Campaign Medal with eight service stars and Arrowhead device	World War II Victory Medal	Army of Occupation Medal	Officer of the Legion of Honour (France)
5th Row	French Croix de guerre 1939–1945 with Palm	Grand Officer of the Order of Orange-Nassau (Netherlands)	Grand Officer of Order of the Oak Crown (Luxembourg)	Order of Abdon Calderón, First Class (Ecuador)

Military offices
Preceded by Jack W. Heard	Commanding General 5th Armored Division; 1943–1945	Succeeded by Morrill Ross
