= 5th Armored Division (United States) =

Inactive US Army formation

- 5th Armored Division shoulder sleeve insignia
- Active: 28 August 1941– 11 October 1945; 25 June 1948–1 February 1950; 1 September 1950–15 March 1956
- Country: United States
- Branch: United States Army
- Type: Armor
- Role: Armored warfare
- Size: 18,000 men Division
- Nickname: Victory
- Mottos: Armis Et Fide (Latin: Arms and Fidelity)
- Engagements: World War II; Normandy; Northern France; Rhineland; Ardennes-Alsace; Central Europe
- Decorations: Luxembourg Croix de guerre

Commanders
- Notable commanders: Lunsford E. Oliver; William L. Mitchell; John J. Binns

Insignia
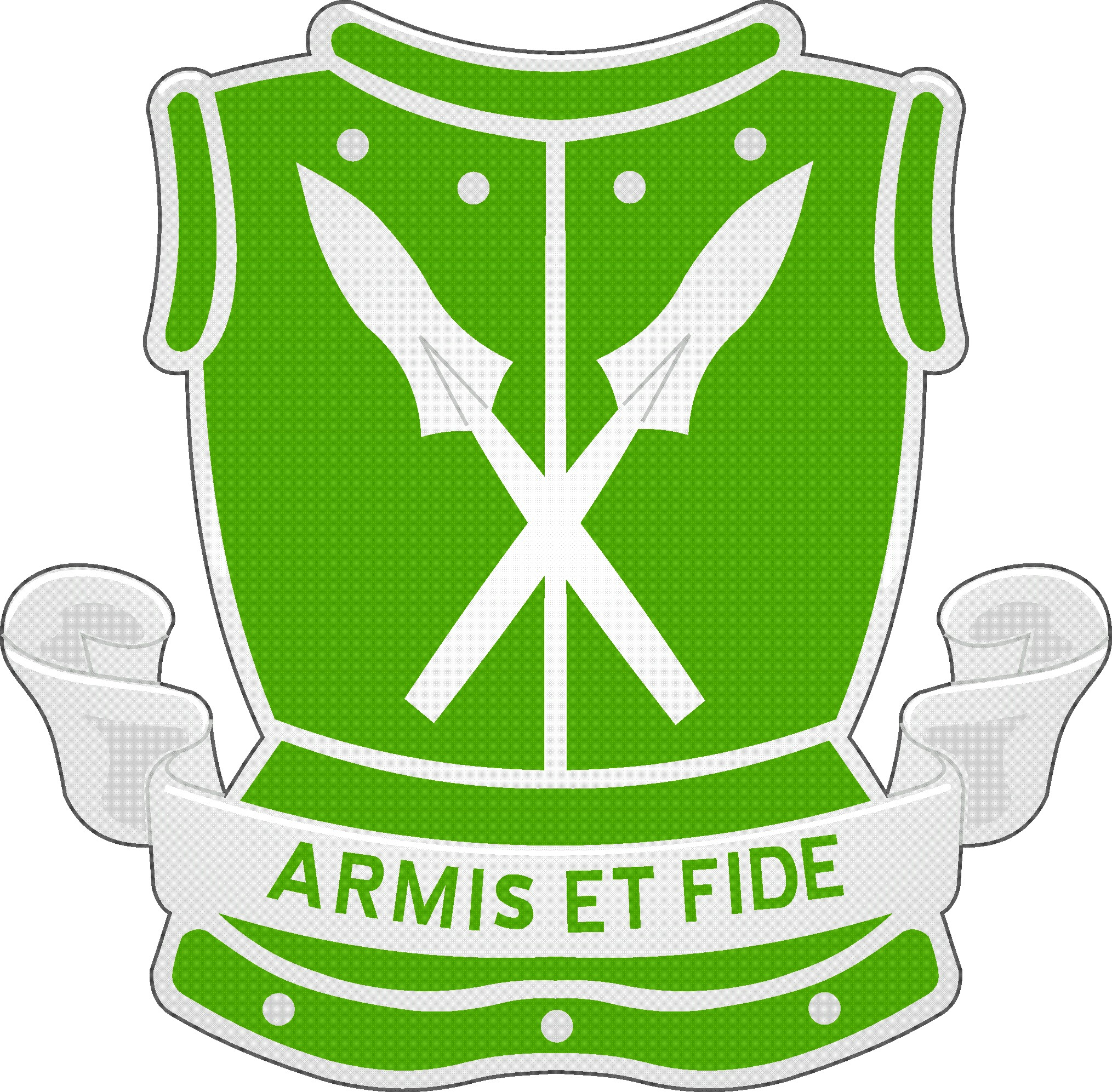
- Distinctive Unit Insignia

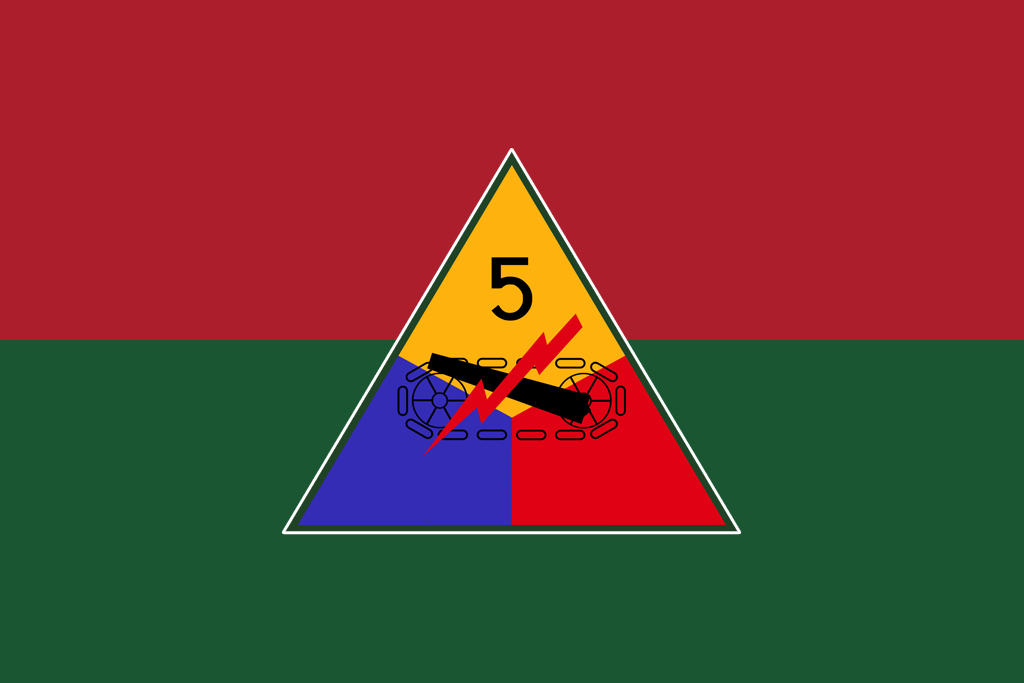
- Flag of the United States Army 5th Armored Division

- NATO Map Symbol

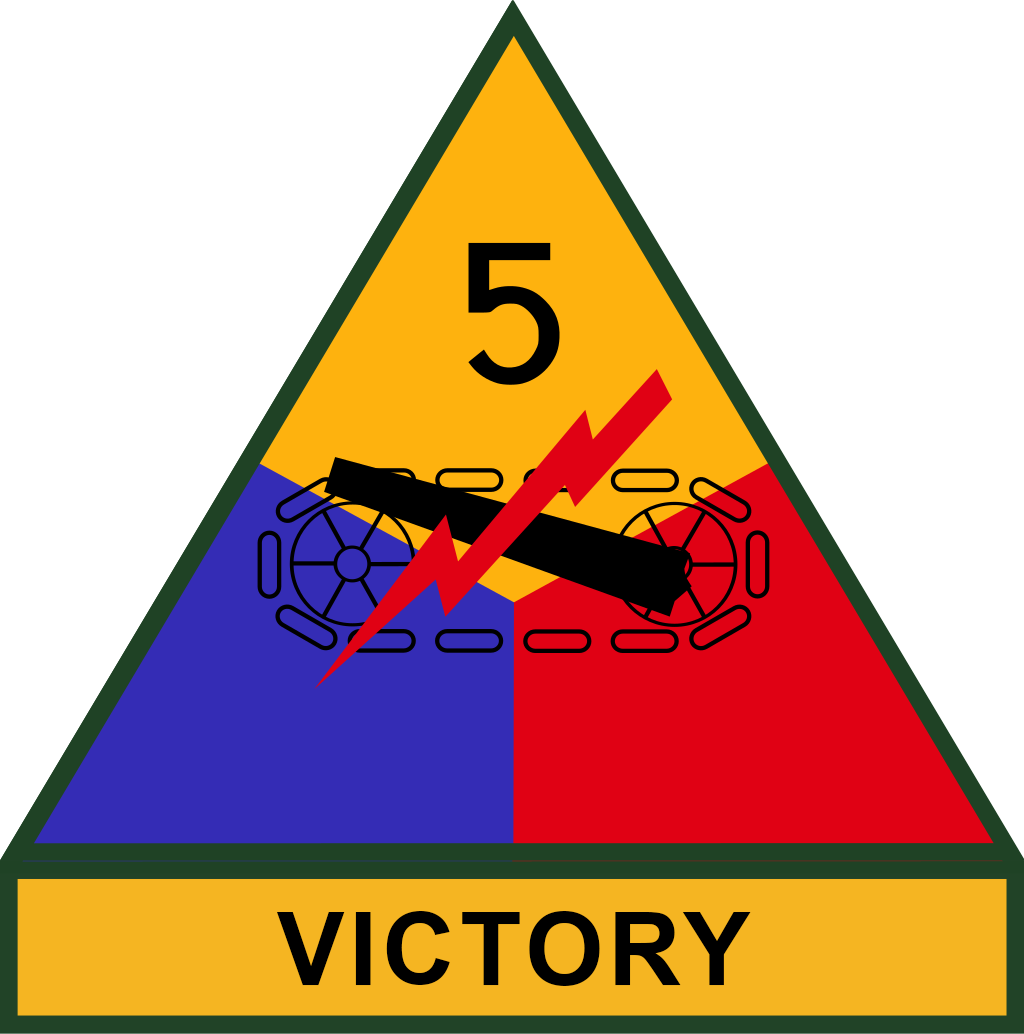
5th Armored Division "Victory" insignia

The 5th Armored Division ("Victory") was an armored formation of the United States Army active from 1941 to 1945 and from 1950 to 1956.

== History ==
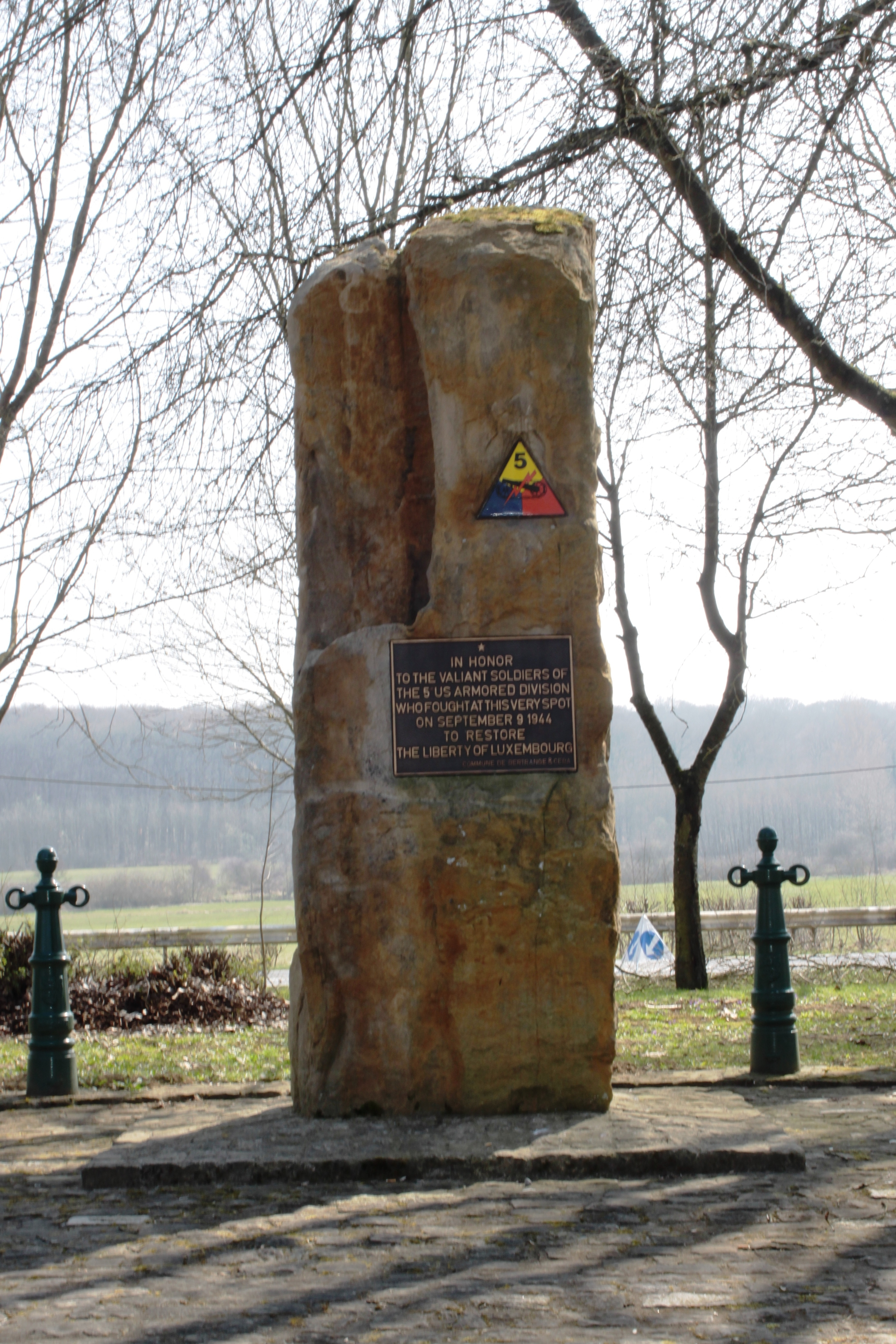
Memorial to the 5th Armored Division in Bertrange, Luxembourg.

The 5th Armored "Victory" Division was activated in the Army of the United States on 10 October 1941 at Fort Knox, Kentucky under the command of Major General Jack W. Heard. The division would move to Camp Cooke, California in August 1942 for training and maneuvers at the Desert Training Center. During this time Brigadier General Sereno E. Brett took command. In February 1943, Major General Lunsford E. Oliver completed the divisions training as its commander. The division would move to Tennessee for maneuvers in April 1943. After this, they would head to Camp Pine, New York for winter training. Finally they would go to Camp Kilmer, New Jersey for embarkation to Europe and reached the United Kingdom in February 1944 for additional training.

=== Combat chronicle ===
The division landed at Utah Beach on 24 July 1944 under the command of Major General Lunsford E. Oliver, and moved into combat on 2 August, driving south through Coutances, Avranches, and Vitré, and across the Mayenne River to seize the city of Le Mans, 8 August. Turning north, the division surrounded the Germans in Normandy by advancing, through Le Mêle-sur-Sarthe liberated on 11 August, to the edge of the city of Argentan on 12 August—8 days before the Argentan-Falaise Gap was closed.

Turning Argentan over to the 90th Infantry Division, the 5th Armored advanced 80 miles to capture the Eure River Line at Dreux on 16 August. Bitter fighting was encountered in clearing the Eure-Seine corridor, the second big trap in France. The 5th passed through Paris 30 August to spearhead V Corps drive through the Compiègne Forest, across the Oise, Aisne, and Somme Rivers, and reached the Belgian border at Condé, 2 September.

The division then turned east, advancing 100 miles in 8 hours, and crossed the Meuse at Charleville-Mézières, 4 September. Racing past Sedan, it liberated Luxembourg City on the 10th and deployed along the German border. The reconnaissance squadron of the division sent a patrol across the German border on the afternoon of 11 September to be the first of the Allies to cross the enemy frontier. On 14 September, the 5th penetrated the Siegfried Line at Wallendorf, remaining until the 20th, to draw off enemy reserves from Aachen.

In October, it held defensive positions in the Monschau-Hofen sector. The division entered the Hurtgen Forest area in late November and pushed the enemy back to the banks of the Roer River in very heavy fighting. On 22 December it was withdrawn to Verviers and placed in 12th Army Group reserve.

Crossing the Roer on 25 February 1945 the 5th spearheaded the XIII Corps drive to the Rhine, crossing the Rhine at Wesel, 30 March. The Division reached the banks of the Elbe at Tangermunde, 12 April—45 miles from Berlin. On 16 April, the 5th moved to Klotze to wipe out the Von Clausewitz Panzer Division and again drove to the Elbe, this time in the vicinity of Dannenberg. The division mopped up in the Ninth Army sector until VE-day.

=== Casualties ===
- Total battle casualties: 3,075
- Killed in action: 833
- Wounded in action: 2,442
- Missing in action: 41
- Prisoner of war: 22

=== Division organization ===
==== Initial division organization ====
When the 5th Armored Division was formed on 15 April 1941 it was composed of the following units:

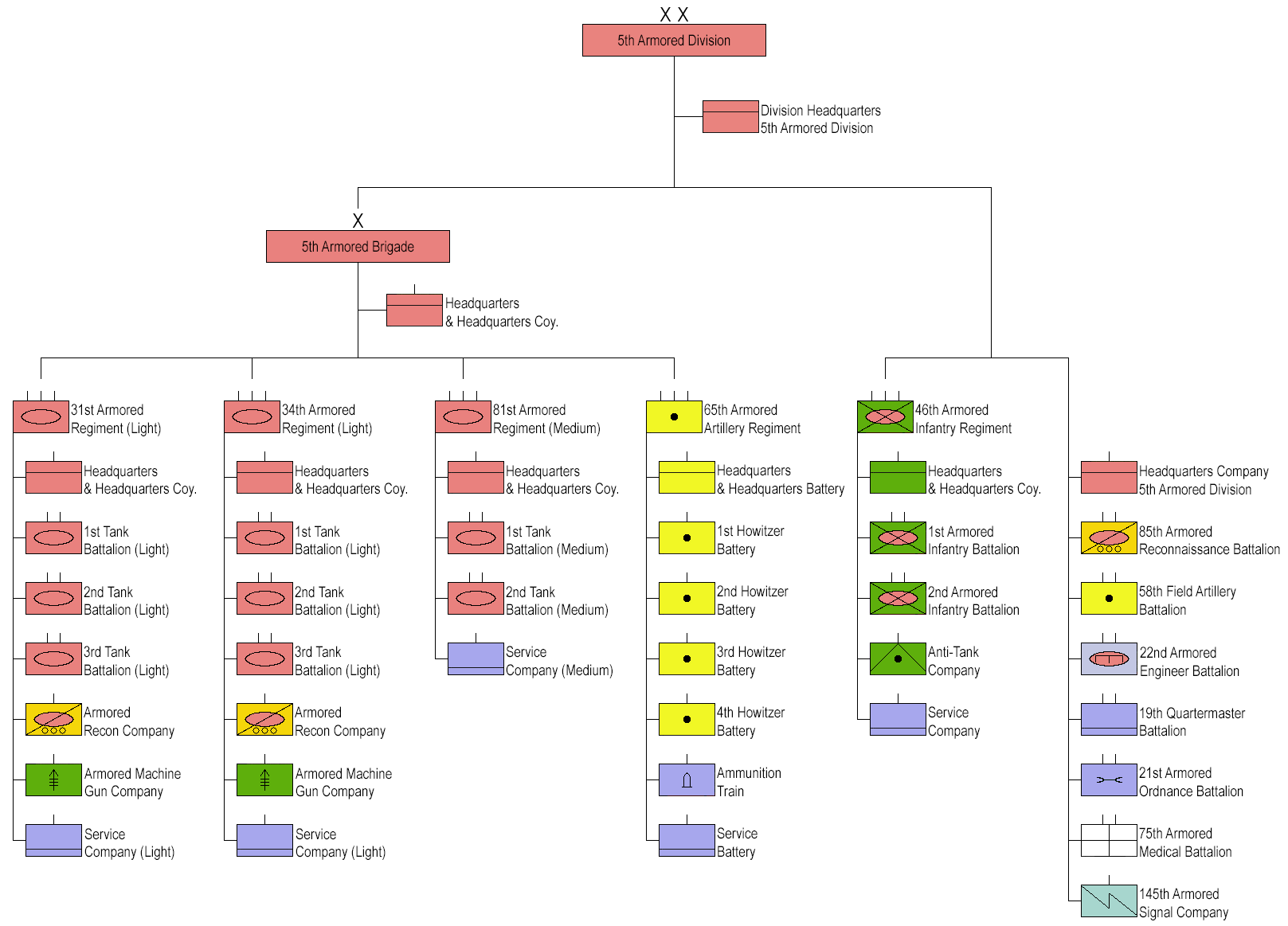
5th Armored Division initial organization (click to enlarge)

- 5th Armored Division
  - Division Headquarters
  - Headquarters Company, 5th Armored Division
  - 145th Armored Signal Company
  - 5th Armored Brigade
    - Headquarters and Headquarters Company
    - 31st Armored Regiment (Light) (transferred in June 1942 to the 7th Armored Division)
      - Headquarters and Headquarters Company
      - Armored Reconnaissance Company (M3 scout cars)
      - Armored Machine Gun Company (M2 half-track cars and M1919 .30-caliber machine guns)
      - Service Company (Light)
      - 3× Tank battalions (Light)
        - each battalion consists of: 1× Headquarters and Headquarters Platoon, 3× tank companies with M3 Stuart light tanks
    - 34th Armored Regiment (Light)
      - same organization as 31st Armored Regiment (Light)
    - 81st Armored Regiment (Medium)
      - Headquarters and Headquarters Company
      - Service Company (Medium)
      - 2× Tank battalions (Medium)
        - each battalion consists of: 1× Headquarters and Headquarters Platoon, 3× tank companies with M3 Lee medium tanks
    - 65th Armored Field Artillery Regiment
      - Headquarters and Headquarters Battery
        - 4× Field artillery batteries (24× M2 105mm towed howitzers)
      - Ammunition Train
      - Service Battery
  - 46th Armored Infantry Regiment
    - Headquarters and Headquarters Company
    - 2× Armored infantry battalions
      - each battalion consists of: 1× Headquarters and Headquarters Platoon, 3× Rifle companies on M3 half-tracks, and 1× Heavy Weapons Company with M3 37mm Anti-Tank guns and M4 mortar carriers
    - Anti-Tank Company (M3 37mm Anti-Tank guns)
    - Service Company
  - 85th Armored Reconnaissance Battalion
    - Headquarters and Headquarters Detachment
    - 2× Armored reconnaissance companies (M3 scout cars)
    - Light Tank Company (M3 Stuart light tanks)
    - Armored Reconnaissance Rifle Company (M3 half-tracks)
  - 58th Field Artillery Battalion
    - Headquarters and Headquarters Battery
    - 3× Field artillery batteries (12× M2 105mm towed howitzers)
    - Anti-Tank Gun Battery (8× M1897 75mm anti-tank guns)
    - Service Battery
  - 22nd Armored Engineer Battalion
    - Headquarters and Headquarters Company
    - 3× Armored engineer companies
    - Bridge Company
  - 19th Quartermaster Battalion
    - Headquarters and Headquarters Company
    - Quartermaster Truck Company
    - Light Maintenance Quartermaster Company
  - 21st Armored Ordnance Battalion
    - Headquarters and Headquarters Company
    - 2× Ordnance companies
  - 75th Armored Medical Battalion
    - Headquarters and Headquarters Detachment
    - Medical Collecting Company
    - Medical Clearing Company
    - Division Surgeon's Office

==== Heavy armored division ====
The Louisiana Maneuvers in August and September 1941 had a profound impact on the organization of US armored division. The exercises exposed that the existing armored divisions were too heavy in armor and too light in infantry and artillery. Additionally the divisions lacked the resources to organize combat teams, while the armored brigade complicated the command channel. It was also found that the division's service elements needed greater control. As a result the Table of Organization of armored divisions was radically reorganized: the armored brigade headquarter was eliminated. The number of armored regiments was reduced from three to two, and the two remaining armored regiments were reorganized to consist of one light and two medium tank battalions each. Three self-propelled 105mm howitzer battalions replaced the armored artillery regiment and field artillery battalion, and control of the artillery passed to an artillery section in the division headquarters. The armored infantry regiment was reorganized to consist of three battalions of three companies each. The engineer battalion added a fourth engineer company. Each divisions also formed two combat command headquarters, which did not have assigned units, but allowed the division commander to assemble combat teams as required. The quartermaster battalion was replaced by a supply battalion, while the ordnance battalion added a third ordnance maintenance company. For better control of the division's service elements, division trains were added. To support the division headquarters company a service company was formed, which provided transportation and supplies, and included the division's military police platoon.

After the reorganization the 5th Armored Division was composed of the following units:

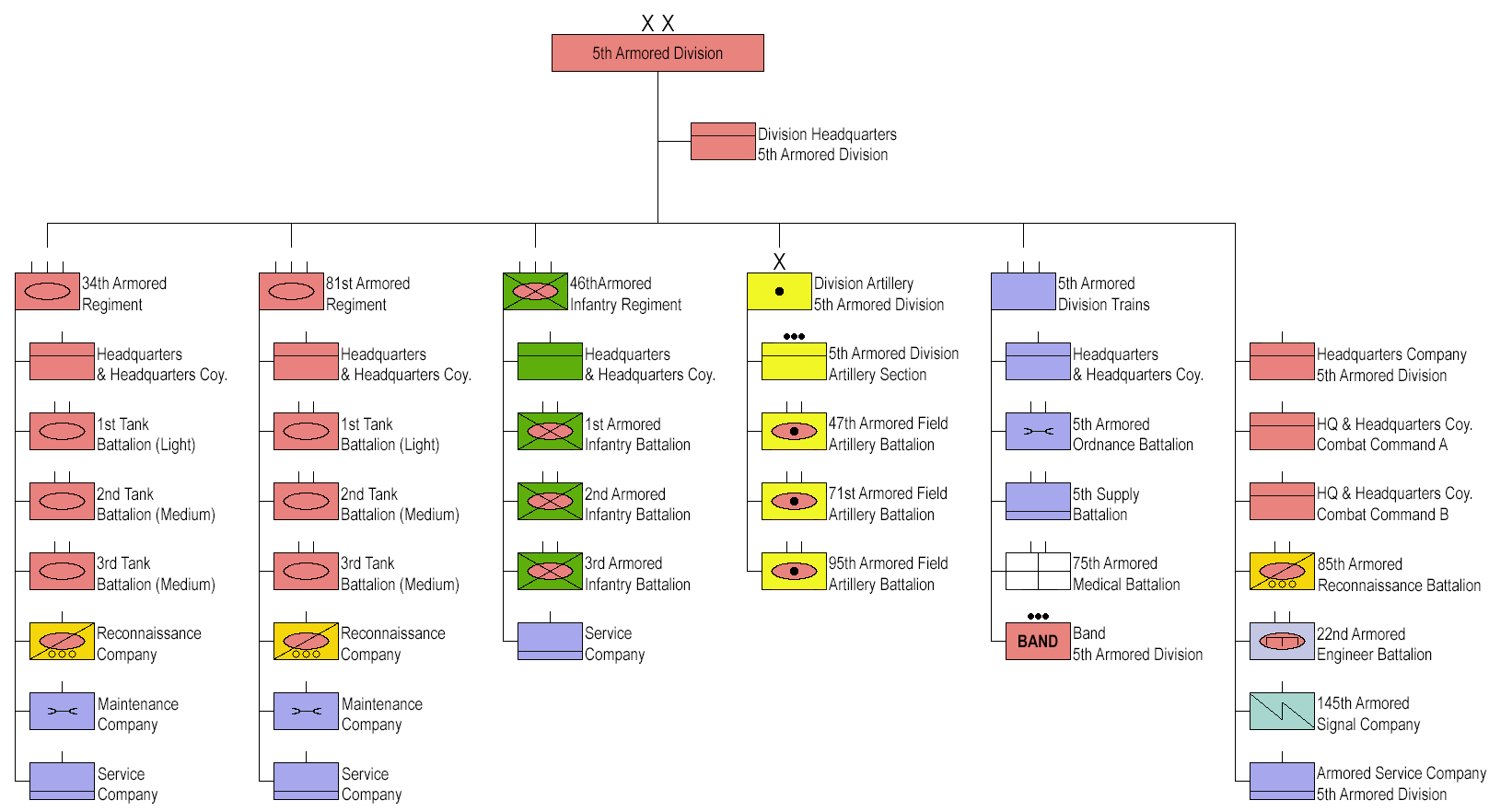
5th Armored Division organization as a heavy armored division (click to enlarge)

- 5th Armored Division
  - Division Headquarters
  - Headquarters Company, 5th Armored Division
  - Headquarters and Headquarters Company, Combat Command A
  - Headquarters and Headquarters Company, Combat Command B
  - 145th Armored Signal Company
  - Armored Service Company (includes the division's Military Police Platoon)
  - 34th Armored Regiment
    - Headquarters and Headquarters Company
    - Reconnaissance Company (M3 scout cars and T30 HMC self propelled guns)
    - Maintenance Company
    - Service Company
    - 1st Tank Battalion (Light)
      - Headquarters and Headquarters Company
      - 3× Light Tank companies (A, B, C) (M3/M5 Stuart light tanks)
    - 2nd Tank Battalion (Medium)
      - Headquarters and Headquarters Company
      - 3× Medium Tank companies (D, E, F) (M4 Sherman tanks)
    - 3rd Tank Battalion (Medium)
      - Headquarters and Headquarters Company
      - 3× Medium Tank companies (G, H, I) (M4 Sherman tanks)
  - 81st Armored Regiment
    - same organization as 34th Armored Regiment
  - 46th Armored Infantry Regiment
    - Headquarters and Headquarters Company
    - 3× Armored infantry battalions
      - each battalion consists of: 1× Headquarters and Headquarters Company, 3× Rifle companies on M3 half-tracks
    - Service Company
  - 85th Armored Reconnaissance Battalion
    - Headquarters and Headquarters Company
    - 3× Reconnaissance companies (M3 scout cars)
    - Light Tank Company (M3/M5 Stuart)
  - 22nd Armored Engineer Battalion
    - Headquarters and Headquarters Company
    - 4× Armored engineer companies
    - Bridge Company
  - 5th Armored Division Artillery
    - 5th Armored Division Artillery Section
    - 47th Armored Field Artillery Battalion
      - Headquarters and Headquarters Battery
      - 3× Field artillery batteries (M7 Priest self propelled howitzers)
      - Service Company
    - 71st Armored Field Artillery Battalion
      - same organization as 47th Armored Field Artillery Battalion
    - 95th Armored Field Artillery Battalion
      - same organization as 47th Armored Field Artillery Battalion
  - 5th Armored Division Trains
    - Headquarters and Headquarters Company
    - 5th Armored Ordnance Battalion
      - Headquarters and Headquarters Company
      - 3× Maintenance companies
    - 5th Supply Battalion
      - Headquarters and Headquarters Company
      - 2× Truck companies
    - 75th Armored Medical Battalion
      - Headquarters and Headquarters Company
      - 3× Medical companies
    - 5th Armored Division Band

==== Light armored division ====
Early in 1943, the Army Ground Force began a series of studies to reorganize the various divisions within the Army. After reviewing the tables of organization and after allowing the various commands to review and comment on the proposed restructure, the War Department published on 15 September 1943 a new armored division tables of organization. The restructuring removed the two armored regiments and armored infantry regiment from the table of organization and replaced them with three tank battalions and three armored infantry battalions. Each tank battalion included one light and three medium tank companies. Both Combat Commands, A and B, remained, but an additional Reserve Command was added to the organization. This was a small headquarters element of 10 personnel tasked to clarify command and control in the division's rear area. Armored engineer battalions lost their bridge companies, while their engineer companies were reduced from four to three. The division's cavalry reconnaissance squadron was increased in size to include an HQ Troop, four reconnaissance troops, a light tank company, and an assault gun troop of four platoons (one for each reconnaissance troop). Within the division trains, the division lost its supply battalion and the division's armored service company. These changes pared the division's strength from 14,630 men to 10,937, slashed the number of tanks from 360 to 263, reduced the variety of vehicles to ease repair problems, and eliminated the maintenance-prone motorcycles.

After its reorganization as a light armored division the 5th Armored Division was composed of the following units:

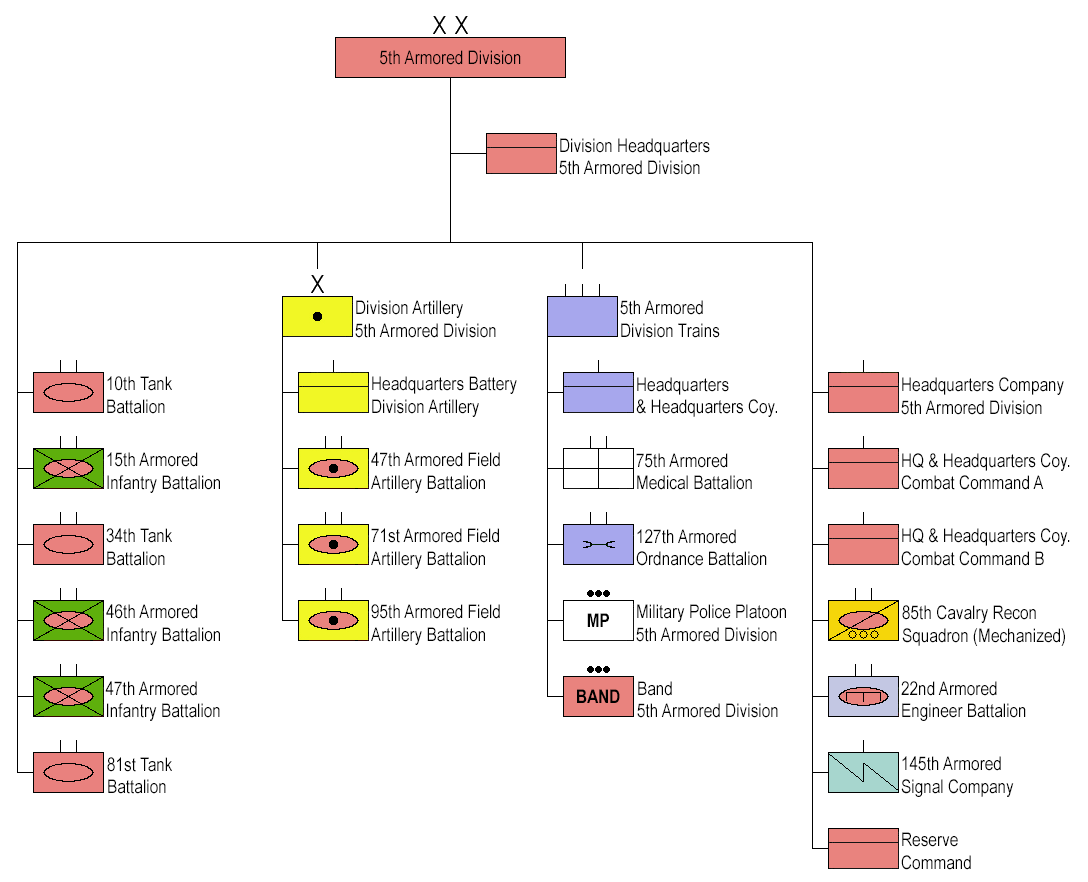
5th Armored Division organization as a light armored division (click to enlarge)

- 5th Armored Division
  - Division Headquarters
  - Headquarters Company, 5th Armored Division
  - Headquarters and Headquarters Company, Combat Command A
  - Headquarters and Headquarters Company, Combat Command B
  - 145th Armored Signal Company
  - Reserve Command
  - 10th Tank Battalion
    - Headquarters and Headquarters Company
    - 3× Medium Tank companies (M4 Sherman tanks)
    - Light Tank Company (M3/M5 Stuart or M24 Chaffee light tanks)
    - Service Company
  - 34th Tank Battalion
    - same organization as 10th Tank Battalion
  - 81st Tank Battalion
    - same organization as 10th Tank Battalion
  - 15th Armored Infantry Battalion
    - Headquarters and Headquarters Company
    - 3× Rifle companies (M3 half-tracks)
    - Service Company
  - 46th Armored Infantry Battalion
    - same organization as 15th Armored Infantry Battalion
  - 47th Armored Infantry Battalion
    - same organization as 15th Armored Infantry Battalion
  - 85th Cavalry Reconnaissance Squadron (Mechanized)
    - Headquarters and Headquarters and Service Troop
    - 4× Cavalry reconnaissance troops (M8 Greyhound armored cars)
    - Cavalry Assault Gun Troop (M8 Scott self propelled guns)
    - Light Tank Company (M3/M5 Stuart or M24 Chaffee light tanks)
  - 22nd Armored Engineer Battalion
    - Headquarters and Headquarters Company
    - 3× Armored engineer companies
  - 5th Armored Division Artillery
    - Headquarters and Headquarters Battery
    - 47th Armored Field Artillery Battalion
      - Headquarters and Headquarters Battery
      - 3× Field artillery batteries (M7 Priest self propelled howitzers)
      - Service Battery
    - 71st Armored Field Artillery Battalion
      - same organization as 47th Armored Field Artillery Battalion
    - 95th Armored Field Artillery Battalion
      - same organization as 47th Armored Field Artillery Battalion
  - 5th Armored Division Trains
    - Headquarters and Headquarters Company
    - 75th Armored Medical Battalion
      - Headquarters and Headquarters Company
      - 3× Medical companies
    - 127th Armored Ordnance Battalion
      - Headquarters and Headquarters Company
      - 3× Maintenance companies
    - Military Police Platoon
    - 5th Armored Division Band

Attached units:

- 628th Tank Destroyer Battalion (attached 2 August 1944 – 19 December 1944, 28 January 1945 – 9 May 1945)
- 629th Tank Destroyer Battalion (attached 29 August 1944 – 14 December 1944)
- 771st Tank Destroyer Battalion (attached 17 April 1945 – 24 April 1945)
- 387th AAA Automatic Weapons Battalion (attached 1 August 1944 – 25 March 1945, 28 March 1945 – 9 May 1945)
- 202d Field Artillery Battalion (attached 2 August 1944 – 25 August 1944)

== Casualties ==
The division's losses included 570 killed in action, 2,442 wounded in action, and 140 who died of wounds.

The division was inactivated on 11 October 1945, at Camp Kilmer, New Jersey. Later, reactivated on 1 September 1950 at Fort Chaffee, Arkansas, as a training division for the Korean War and inactivated for the final time 15 March 1956.

== Commanders ==
- MG Jack W. Heard (1941–1942)
- BG Sereno E. Brett (1942 – February 1943)
- MG Lunsford E. Oliver (February 1943 – May 1945)
- BG David L. Ruffner (January 1951 – May 1952)
- MG Edmund B. Sebree (1952–1953)
- MG William L. Mitchell (1953–1955)
