= Operation Saratoga =

Part of the Vietnam War (1967–1968)

- Part of Vietnam War
Date	8 December 1967 – 11 March 1968
Location	Hậu Nghĩa, Tây Ninh and Bình Dương Provinces, South Vietnam

Belligerents
United States	Viet Cong; North Vietnam

Commanders and leaders
Fillmore K. Mearns	Unknown

Units involved
2nd Brigade, 25th Infantry Division	Unknown

Casualties and losses
275 killed	2,043 killed 139 captured

Operation Saratoga was a search and destroy operation during the Vietnam War conducted by the 2nd Brigade, 25th Infantry Division that took place in northeastern Hậu Nghĩa, southern Tây Ninh and western Bình Dương Provinces, lasting from 8 December 1967 to 11 March 1968. During this period the Tet Offensive took place and US forces were used for the defense of Saigon.

== Background ==
The purpose of the operation was to conduct combined operations with the Army of the Republic of Vietnam (ARVN) 5th and 25th Divisions to neutralize Vietcong (VC) bases in the Filhol Plantation and the Ho Bo Woods, control resources and prevent VC rice taxation.

== Operation ==
=== 1967 ===
The operation commenced on 8 December with the 1st Battalion, 27th Infantry Regiment landed in the Ho Bo Woods and the Filhol Plantation to secure the area for a Rome plow sweep to clear more than 5,250 acres of land. The battalion encountered no serious resistance. That same day, the 4th Battalion, 23rd Infantry Regiment, escorted the division engineers and their plows out of the Iron Triangle and back across the Saigon River via barges, reaching Cu Chi Base Camp without incident. On 11 December 1/27th Infantry conducted an air assault and a supporting gunship was shot down, they later overran a VC bunker position killing nine VC for one US killed and later killed another VC and captured one while gunships killed another VC. On 12 December, the People’s Army of Vietnam (PAVN) 1st Battalion, 101st Regiment, attacked the 1/27th Infantry as it was setting up a night defense position in the Filhol Plantation. They repulsed the assault with help from artillery crews based at Cu Chi, twelve kilometers to the south, killing 39 PAVN. On 14 December 4/23rd Infantry lost two killed by small arms fire and booby-traps.

After several days passed without further sign of the 101st, General Fillmore K. Mearns decided to put Saratoga on hold so he could launch a new operation known as ‘’’Operation Camden’’’ to trap the PAVN 101st Regiment. On 17 December, the 1st and 2d Battalions, 27th Infantry, and several companies from the 2nd Battalion, 34th Armor Regiment, began a sweep through the Ho Bo and Boi Loi Woods. The 3rd Brigade established a blocking force along the eastern side of the Saigon River to prevent the PAVN regiment from escaping into the Trapezoid base area located just north of the Iron Triangle. Two battalions from the ARVN 49th Regiment, 25th Division, also joined the operation. The first major contact occurred on 21 December when a battalion-size VC force ambushed Company A, 2/27th Infantry and several M48 tanks that were searching the Ho Bo Woods. The Americans sustained four killed, while also losing two tanks destroyed, while VC losses were 42 killed. The next day on the eastern side of the river, the 3rd Battalion, 22nd Infantry Regiment found the 101st Regiment while combing through the Trapezoid, stumbling onto a pair of bunker complexes manned by PAVN soldiers, resulting in an all-day fight that left 14 US dead. The PAVN withdrew during the night, carrying away all but three dead. Mearns spent another week searching for the 101st, finally terminating Operation Camden on 31 December. During the operation, the US/ARVN had killed over 100 PAVN/VC, captured 29 detainees and 19 tons of rice, and destroyed another 35 tons of rice that could not be easily relocated.

All of the attention devoted to degrading the PAVN/VC main forces and bases along the Saigon River corridor in November and December necessarily pulled troops away from maintaining Hậu Nghĩa’s day-to-day security. Usually the 2nd Brigade could muster only one battalion for security duties, and sometimes none. The ARVN had also removed two battalions from Hậu Nghĩa and sent them to Tây Ninh Province to participate in Operation Yellowstone. When US troops were available, they performed ground patrols, small airmobile raids, search-and-destroy operations, and hamlet cordon-and-search actions. One of the hamlet searches, conducted by the 2/27th Infantry, and Vietnamese Police Field Force on 16 December apprehended 100 VC suspects. Forty Kit Carson Scouts assisted in most of these operations. Meanwhile, the Division’s military police continued to perform resource control operations with their South Vietnamese counterparts, netting 100,000 piasters worth of contraband, almost a kilogram of marijuana, and 53 deserters and draft dodgers in December. The brigade’s training and civic action activities likewise continued unabated, while the Combined Reconnaissance and Intelligence Platoon (CRIP) vigorously harried the VC. By year’s end, the platoon had killed 92 VC, captured 36, and destroyed twenty tunnels since its formation in the spring.

Reports of PAVN/VC troop movements began to filter into allied intelligence centers during the final days of 1967. The focal point of these movements was the VC-dominated Đức Huệ District and the Vàm Cỏ Đông River. Several small clashes occurred during the last weeks of December that indicated that the VC intend to attack the provincial capital. On the night of 12 December, the VC lobbed 35 mortar shells into the city, while a platoon unsuccessfully attacked a Popular Forces post north of town. Two weeks later, a CRIP patrol located 50 VC outside Bao Trai and dispersed them by calling in artillery. Far more serious than these skirmishes were indications that the VC in Hau Nghia were refitting both their local forces and the guerrillas with AK-47 assault rifles, weapons that would give them a significant advantage in any firefight with government forces.

=== 1968 ===
On 1 January Company C, 1/27th Infantry engaged a VC force killing three and later that day Company D engaged six VC killing two. On 4 January Company C, 1/27th Infantry killed one VC while supporting gunships killed five VC. Later that day Companies B and C lost six US killed by small arms fire, Company B attacked a VC position killing two VC and Company A lost one killed by sniper fire and killed three VC. Company A later lost several killed in a friendly fire incident while Companies C and D each lost one killed by small arms fire. On 5 January gunships and aircraft supporting 1/27th Infantry killed 10 VC. Later that day Company B, 1/27th Infantry found 10 VC graves, while 2/27th Infantry found numerous VC graves and dead. On 6 January 1/27th Infantry found 10 VC graves/dead, while 2/27th Infantry found five VC dead.

On 8 January Company C, 1/27th Infantry engaged nine VC killing one and later found two VC killed by artillery fire. A 4/23rd Infantry M113 armored personnel carrier hit a land mine destroying the vehicle. On 9 January 1/27th Infantry engaged three VC killing one. On 10 January 1/27th Infantry’s night defensive position was attacked resulting in five US killed, artillery and air support was called in killing 33 VC with one captured. Gunships killed two VC and captured one and Companies C and D found 30 VC dead. Later that day gunships killed a further four VC and Company D killed one. The same day gunships supporting 2/27th Infantry found 23 VC graves and one gunship was shot down. On 11 January Company B, 2/27th Infantry killed five VC and captured two. On 12 January gunships supporting 1/27th Infantry killed two VC. Gunships and aircraft supporting 2/27th Infantry killed five VC while a Company C soldier was killed by sniper fire. On 13 January gunships supporting 2/27th Infantry killed two VC and Company C located nine dead VC. A Rome plow escorted by 4/23rd Infantry received RPG fire and troops responded killing one VC.

On 16 January Recon platoon, 1/27th Infantry killed one VC, Company C killed 10 VC and supporting gunships killed four VC. On 17 January a mortar attack on 1/27th Infantry’s night defensive position killed seven US and a Company B, 4/23rd Infantry soldier was killed by friendly artillery fire. On 18 January a 4/23rd Infantry M113 was destroyed by a mine and Company D killed three VC. On 19 January Company A, 2/34th Armor lost one killed by small arms and RPG-2 fire. On 20 January Company D, 1/27th Infantry killed one VC while losing two killed and a Company A, 4/23rd Infantry M113 was destroyed by a mine. On 21 January Company A, 2/27th Infantry found three VC graves, while Companies A and C, 4/23rd Infantry engaged a VC force killing 30 for the loss of three US killed.

On 22 January gunships supporting 2/27th Infantry killed three VC. Company A killed two VC, Company B killed two VC and found one grave, Company D killed three VC and found five graves and gunships killed a further three VC. On 23 January a Company C, 4/23rd Infantry M113 was destroyed by a mine and numerous mines caused minor damage to Rome plows. On 24 January 1/27th Infantry units found a VC base camp area, while Company B, 2/27th Infantry found 5,000lbs of rice. Companies B and D, 4/23rd came under small arms and RPG fire losing three killed and two M113s destroyed, Company C later located graves containing 38 VC and a Company A M113 hit a mine killing one US. On 25 January gunships supporting 1/27th Infantry killed a VC on a sampan. Rome plows detonated numerous antitank mines and Company A, 4/23rd killed two VC. On 26 January 2/27th Infantry killed several VC while supporting gunships killed two. Gunships supporting 4/23rd Infantry killed two VC, Rome plows detonated numerous antitank mines and one M113 was destroyed and helicopters and artillery killed six VC. On 27 January a UH-1 supporting 2/27th Infantry crashed and was destroyed and another was damaged by crash debris and forces to land and Company D found one dead VC. 4/23rd Infantry Rome plows hit three mines with minimal damage. 3rd Battalion, 22nd Infantry Regiment received small arms fire resulting in one dead, battalion companies killed seven VC and found three graves and had a further two US killed while supporting gunships killed three VC. On 28 January a 1/27th Infantry unit detonated a dud artillery round killing two soldiers. Company C found several VC killed by gunships and Company C, 3/22nd Infantry found one dead VC and supporting artillery destroyed a sampan killing two VC. On 29 January 4/23rd Infantry Rome plows detonated numerous mines resulting in minimal damage. 3/22nd Infantry received heavy small arms fire killing one US and returned fire killing five VC and supporting gunships killed five VC.

At the start of the Tet Offensive on 30 January 2/27th Infantry conducted a night airmobile assault to support Troop D, 3rd Battalion, 4th Cavalry Regiment, gunships killed 25 VC and in a sweep of the perimeter found 43 dead VC were found and one captured. 4/23rd Infantry found VC hiding in tunnels killing two and capturing six. 3/22nd Infantry found 3 dead VC and killed 1. On 31 January Company B, 1/27th Infantry engaged a VC force losing 2 killed and in a later engagement killed 22 VC and captured a 75mm recoilless rifle and four weapons. 1/27th Infantry later conducted an airmobile assault to support ARVN units heavily engaged at Hóc Môn District and the battalion was placed under the operation control of II Field Force, Vietnam. 2/27th Infantry conducted an airmobile assault to support the 3/4th Cavalry moving towards Saigon to counter the attack on Tan Son Nhut Air Base and was placed under the operation control of the Capital Military District. 4/23rd Infantry and 3/22nd Infantry moved to secure Cu Chi Base Camp and the surrounding area.

On 1 February 3/22nd Infantry undertook operations to reopen the roads around Cu Chi killing 11 VC and capturing two. On 2 February 4/23rd Infantry found six VC dead and recovered seven weapons, Company B killed two VC, Companies B and C were attacked by VC resulting in one US and five VC killed and mortar attacks on Cu Chi Base Camp killed one US. On 3 February 2nd Battalion, 12th Infantry Regiment engaged two groups of VC killing seven and a supporting gunship was downed by small arms fire. 3/22nd Infantry destroyed an ambush site on Highway 1, following a mortar attack Company A killed 13 VC. 4/23rd Infantry linked up with 3/22nd Infantry to clear Highway 1 and then searched for VC rocket sites, losing three M113s destroyed in combat with VC.

On 5 February 2/12th Infantry conducted airmobile assaults engaging two groups of VC losing four dead and killing 27 VC, while gunships and airstrikes killed a further 34. On 6 February the CRIP was engaged by VC suffering 10 wounded while VC losses were unknown. 2/12th Infantry conducted airmobile assaults and were engaged by VC killing nine VC while airstrikes and artillery killed six VC. Companies C and D, 3/22nd Infantry on a road-sweeping mission were attacked by VC losing five killed. On 7 February Company C, 3/22nd Infantry lost two killed to small arms fire and Company A lost one killed. On 8 February Company C, 2/12th Infantry killed three VC with Claymore mines, Company B captured five VC and Company D was attacked by VC resulting in one US killed and 22 VC killed. 3/22nd Infantry found 30 VC dead. On 9 February Company C, 2/12th Infantry on a road security operation received VC fire losing one killed, they returned fire and in the subsequent battle killed eight VC for a further two US killed and in two further contacts Companies A and B lost six killed. 3/22nd Infantry killed 23 VC. On 10 February 2/12th Infantry had numerous contacts with VC killing a total of 14. 3/22nd Infantry also had multiple skirmishes resulting in four US killed. On 11 February Company A, 2/12th Infantry was attacked by VC resulting in one US killed and 10 VC killed.

On 12 February 2/12th Infantry engaged several groups of VC losing one killed. Companies C and D 3/22nd Infantry cleared a VC bunker complex supported by armor losing four killed. On 13 February 2/12th Infantry has two US killed in two separate engagements, 3/22nd Infantry also had two skirmishes, 4/23rd Infantry was engaged by an entrenched VC force with four US killed and three M113s destroyed in the battle and airstrikes killed five VC. On 14 February 2/12th Infantry found 46 VC dead, 3/22nd Infantry killed 10 VC, 4/23rd Infantry overran the remaining VC positions killing 91 VC for the loss of 10 US killed and airstrikes and helicopters killed a further seven VC. On 15 February 2/12th Infantry found 36 VC dead and 3/22nd Infantry killed 22 VC. On 16 February 2/12th Infantry skirmished twice with VC, 3/22nd Infantry killed three VC and found 25 VC dead. On 17 February 1st Battalion (Mechanized), 5th Infantry Regiment killed four VC, 1/27th Infantry recovered the bodies of two missing soldiers, 3/22nd Infantry found 10 VC dead and airstrikes killed one VC and airstrikes killed one VC. On 18 February 1/5th Infantry was attacked by two VC companies and returned fire killing seven, a mortar attack on 1/5th night defensive position killed one US. 1/27th Infantry located two VC graves, Company D, 2/27th Infantry found 21 VC graves, L Troop, 11th Armored Cavalry Regiment was attacked by VC and returned fire killing 24 and gunships killed eight VC.

On 19 February 1/5th Infantry killed one VC, Company D, 1/27th Infantry killed one VC, Company B, 2/27th Infantry killed five VC, Company B, 3/22nd Infantry came under fire losing three killed and a Company A convoy was fired on and they killed one VC. On 20 February Company C, 1/27th Infantry killed one VC and Company D killed one VC and Company D, 3/22nd Infantry received fire and killed five VC. On 21 February Recon platoon, 1/27th Infantry killed one VC, a medevac helicopter was downed by small-arms fire and a company soldier was killed in a skirmish with three to five VC. Company C, 2/27th Infantry found two VC dead and then killed one VC. On 22 February a Forward air controller (FAC) supporting 1/5th Infantry directed a Napalm strike killing one VC and Company C killed two VC. Company C, 1/27th Infantry received fire killing three US and then killed one VC and found five VC dead, Company D tripped a booby-trap killing one US and Company C found another VC dead. Company D, 2/27th Infantry killed two VC, gunships killed two VC, Company D found 19 VC dead, gunships killed one VC and Company C found four VC graves. In three separate skirmishes 3/22nd Infantry killed three VC. On 23 February 1/27th Infantry found six VC dead, 2/27th Infantry killed four VC in five skirmishes and found four VC dead. Company B, 3/22nd Infantry received small arms fire killing one US and Company D found seven VC dead. On 24 February Company C, 1/27th Infantry received fire and responded killing five VC, Company A killed two VC and Company D engaged seven VC with unknown results. Company C, 3/22nd Infantry received automatic weapons fire killing one US and then killed one VC. On 25 February Company B, 2/27th Infantry killed two VC, Company C received firing killing three US and returned fire killing two VC and the Brigade command & control helicopter killed two VC. Company D, 3/22nd Infantry found 21 VC dead and then came under fire and killed eight VC. 4th Battalion, 9th Infantry Regiment joined the operation and Companies B and C received fire killing three US.

On 26 February Company B, 2/27th Infantry killed two VC, Company D received fire killing three US and returned fire killing one VC and three M113s were hit by RPGs killing two US and destroying all three M113s. Company B, 4/9th Infantry received fire killing one US and returned fire killing two VC and later that day the Battalion was attacked by VC killing one US and they returned fire killing 12 VC. On 27 February Company D, 2/27th Infantry received fire and killed 12 VC while supporting gunships killed a further three. Company A, 4/9th infantry killed two VC, Company A killed two VC, Company C killed five VC in bunkers, found one VC dead and killed a further three VC and Company B found four VC graves. 2/34th Armor and Company C, 1/5th infantry killed 12 VC in three separate engagements. On 28 February 1/5th Infantry found seven VC dead, 2/27th Infantry found seven VC dead, 3/22nd Infantry found three VC dead and 4/9th Infantry found one VC dead. 2/34th Armor’s night defensive position received mortar fire killing one US and later small arms and RPG fire killed another US, the units returned fire killing one VC and capturing three. On 29 February gunships supporting 2/27th Infantry killed one VC, a FAC killed one VC, Company C found one VC dead, gunships killed three VC and Companies C and D engaged the VC in three other skirmishes. Company A, 3/22nd Infantry received sniper fire and captured one VC and Company D found one VC dead. The Brigade command and control helicopter killed three VC and FACs directed fire killing 12 VC.

On 1 March Company A, 1/5th Infantry found three VC dead, Company B, 2/27th Infantry killed four VC. 3/22nd Infantry killed several VC and Company A killed 14 VC. Company B, 4/9th Infantry killed one VC, Company B found one VC dead, Company A found two VC dead, Company B found one VC dead and later received small arms fire losing two killed. On 2 March 2/34th Armor and Company C, 1/5th Infantry killed two VC, found 15 VC graves and captured four VC. On 3 March 2/27th Infantry killed three VC, Company A, 3/22nd killed seven VC and found one grave, Company B found 12 VC graves and killed one VC and Company C found seven VC graves. 4/9th Infantry found three dead VC and were engaged by VC killing 11.

On 4 March Company A, 2/27th Infantry engaged a sampan killing four VC, Company D, 3/22nd Infantry found six VC graves, Company D, 4/9th killed one VC, Company A and gunships killed three VC and 2/34th Armor found one VC grave. On 5 March 2/27th Infantry found 13 VC dead, 3/22nd Infantry found nine VC dead, 4/9th Infantry found 14 VC dead, 2/34th Armor killed three VC and the Brigade command and control helicopter killed two VC. On 6 March Company D, 3/22nd Infantry received firing killing one US, Company B, 4/9th Infantry received fire and killed one VC and 2/34th Armor captured four VC and found one dead. On 7 March Company C, 2/27th Infantry found four VC dead, Company C, 3/22nd Infantry received fire killing two US, Company B, 4/9th Infantry received sniper fire and killed one VC, Company D killed one VC, Company A received fire killing one US and later received fire and killed three VC and Company C, 1/5th Infantry found 18 VC graves. On 8 March Company D, 4/9th Infantry found two VC dead and later killed two VC. On 10 March 1/27th Infantry’s night defensive position received mortar fire killing one US, gunships attacked a VC platoon killing two VC and then a further three VC, gunships killed another six VC that afternoon, Companies C and D received heavy fire killing one US and gunships killed another four VC. 2/27th Infantry received several attacks by fire and killed one VC sniper and airstrikes killed four VC.

== Aftermath ==
The operation was suspended on 11 March 1968 by General Frederick C. Weyand, commander of II Field Force, Vietnam so that the forces could be dedicated to Operation Quyet Thang. VC losses were 2,043 killed and 139 captured for US losses of 275 killed.
