= Sereno E. Brett =

United States Army general (1891–1952)

Sereno Elmer Brett
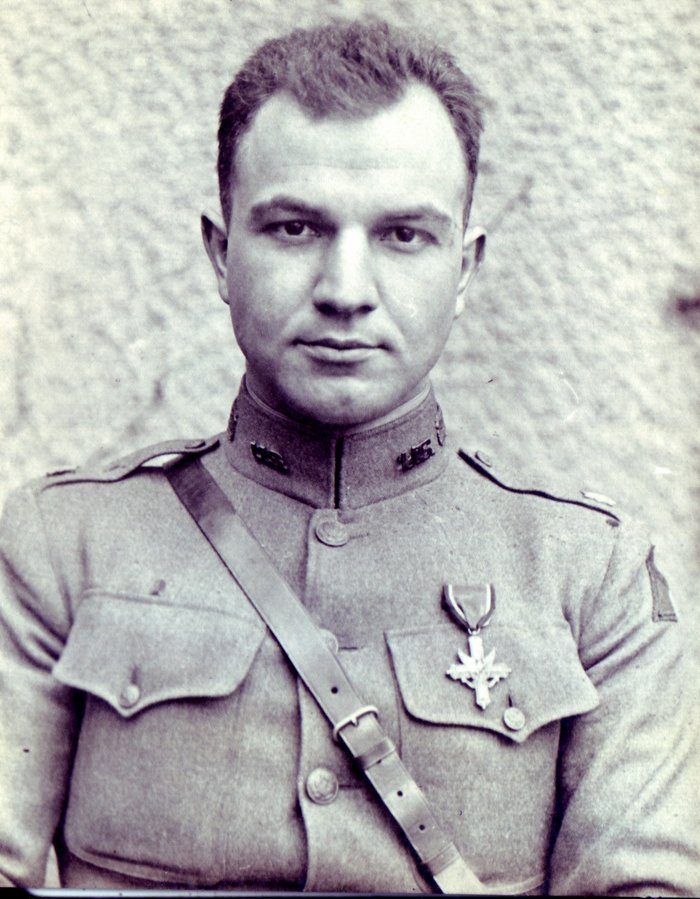
- Brett in uniform, c. 1918
- Born: October 31, 1891; Portland, Oregon, US
- Died: September 9, 1952 (aged 60); Santa Barbara, California, US
- Military career
- Branch: United States Army
- Service years: 1916–1943
- Rank: Brigadier general
- Service number: 0-4630
- Unit: Infantry Branch
- Commands: 326th Battalion, Tank Corps; 5th Armored Division
- Conflicts: Pancho Villa Expedition; World War I World War II
- Awards: Distinguished Service Cross; Army Distinguished Service Medal; Silver Star (2)

Sereno Elmer Brett (October 31, 1891 – September 9, 1952) was a highly decorated brigadier general in the United States Army who fought in both World War I and World War II and played a key, if little recognized today, role in the development of armored warfare along with the creation of the U.S. Interstate Highway. He was also a lifelong friend of U.S. president, and former army colleague, Dwight D. Eisenhower.

== Early life and military career ==
Brett was born on October 31, 1891, in Portland, Oregon, as a son of James Brett, and Clara Marie de Lille Harvey. Brett enrolled at Oregon Agricultural College (now Oregon State University ) and earned his Bachelor of Science at the Agricultural college's School of Forestry in 1916. After graduation, Brett entered the Oregon National Guard and then the United States Army and, after attending a training course for officers, he was commissioned as a second lieutenant into the Infantry Branch of the Oregon National Guard, on November 28, 1916.

He first saw active service with the 3rd Infantry Regiment, Oregon National Guard during the Pancho Villa Expedition where they stood watch at Calexico.

During World War I, Brett was ordered to join the American Expeditionary Force (AEF), under the command of Major General John J. Pershing, on the Western Front in Belgium and France, to serve with the Tank Corps.

He was promoted to the rank of captain on July 25, 1917.

Commanding the 326th Tank Battalion, Tank Corps; Brett, now a major, led the first major American tank attack of World War I at the Battle of Saint-Mihiel in September 1918 and, following Colonel George S. Patton's wounding, took command of the 1st Brigade, Tank Corps, in his absence. Brett received the Distinguished Service Cross for his role in the battle. The Great War came to an end soon after, on November 11, 1918. In addition to the Distinguished Service Cross, his other decorations from the war were: Silver Star with Oak Leaf Cluster, Purple Heart with two Oak Leaf Clusters, French Croix de guerre 1914–1918 with palm and Officer of the Legion of Honour.

=== Distinguished Service Cross citation ===
His official Distinguished Service Cross citation reads:

General Orders: War Department, General Orders No. 15 (1919)
Action Date: September 12, 1918
Name: Sereno Elmer Brett
Service: Army
Rank: Major
Battalion: 326th Battalion (Light) Tanks
Division: Tank Corps, American Expeditionary Forces
Citation: The President of the United States of America, authorized by Act of Congress, July 9, 1918, takes pleasure in presenting the Distinguished Service Cross to Major (Armor) Sereno Elmer Brett, United States Army, for extraordinary heroism in action while serving with 326th Tank Battalion, Tank Corps, A.E.F., near Richecourt, France, 12 September 1918. On the opening day of the St. Mihiel offensive Major Brett led his battalion on foot from Richecourt to the Bois Quart De Reserve in the face of heavy machine-gun and artillery fire, and by his coolness and courage setting an example to the entire battalion.

Brett was also decorated with the Distinguished Service Medal for his service as chief instructor of Tank Center of the American Expeditionary Force.

=== Distinguished Service Medal citation ===
His official Distinguished Service Medal citation reads:

General Orders: War Department, General Orders No. 49 (1922)
Action Date: World War I
Name: Sereno Elmer Brett
Service: Army
Rank: Major
Company: Commanding Officer
Regiment: 1st Brigade
Division: Tank Corps, American Expeditionary Forces
Citation: The President of the United States of America, authorized by Act of Congress, July 9, 1918, takes pleasure in presenting the Army Distinguished Service Medal to Major (Armor) Sereno Elmer Brett, United States Army, for exceptionally meritorious and distinguished services to the Government of the United States, in a duty of great responsibility during World War I. As Chief Instructor at Tank Center, American Expeditionary Forces, Major Brett organized and trained the 327th Battalion (Light) Tanks. Later, as Commander of the 326th Battalion (Light) Tanks, he vigorously and skillfully led it in the St. Mihiel offensive over a terrain rendered most difficult through four years of enemy entrenching. Succeeding to the command of the 1st Brigade, Tank Corps, in the Meuse-Argonne offensive, he ably devotedly, and courageously commanded his brigade from 26 September to 10 November 1918; during this period of 46 days his brigade supported eight of the divisions of the First Army in 18 separate attacks. By his brilliant professional attainments, technical ability, and unusual leadership he contributed in a marked manner to the success of the First Army and rendered most conspicuous services to the American Expeditionary Forces in a position of great responsibility.

== Life after the war ==
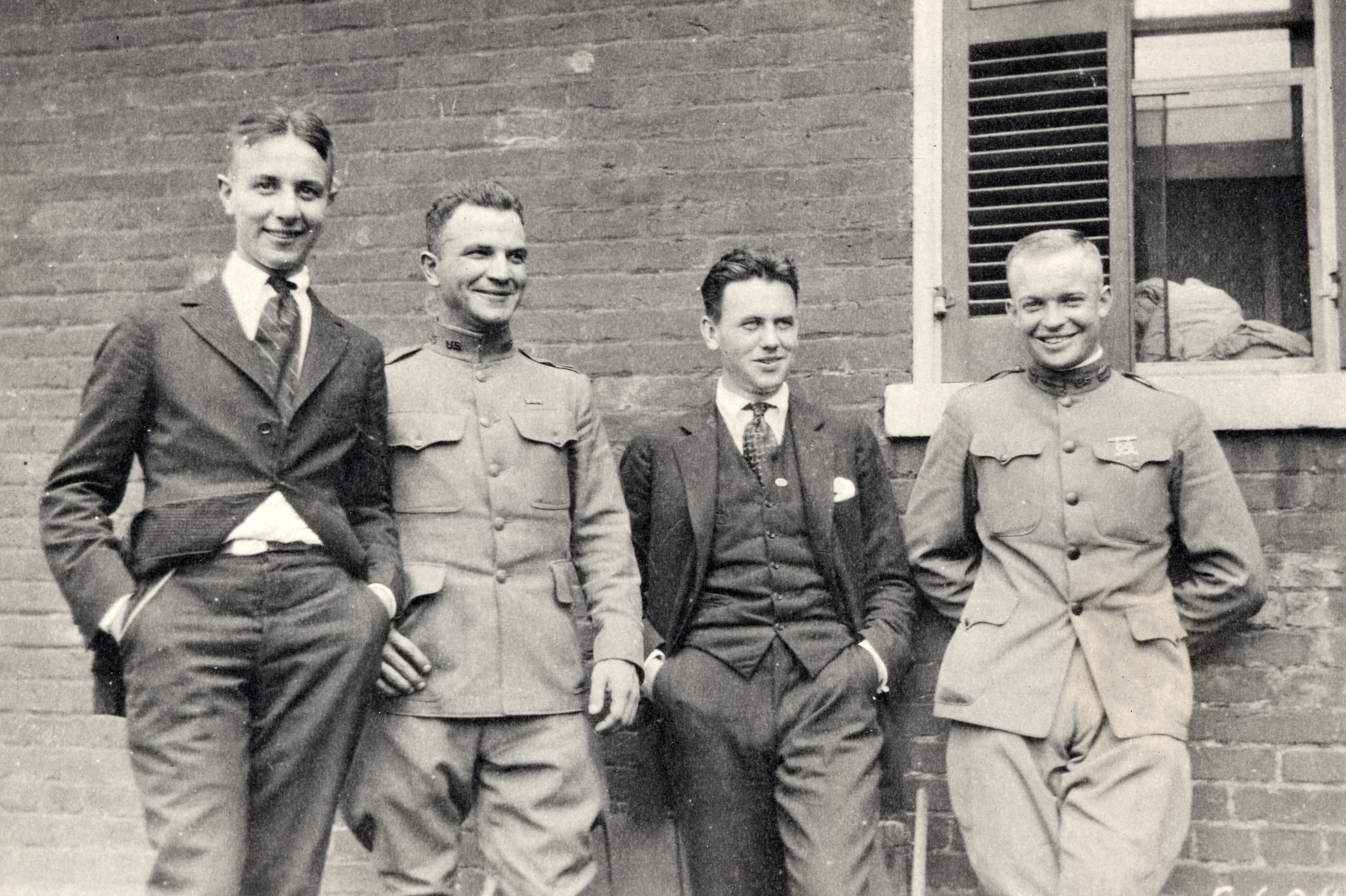
Eisenhower (far right) with three friends (William Stuhler, Major Brett, and Paul V. Robinson) in 1919, four years after graduating from West Point

Following the war, he played a role alongside Patton and Dwight D. Eisenhower in evaluating the lessons learned from the war in the use of tanks in modern warfare. During this time he wrote many forward thinking articles about the development of combined arms units.

In 1919, Brett and future U.S. President Dwight D. Eisenhower toured the country's emerging paved highways with an Army caravan of 80-or-so military vehicles, Army's 1919 transcontinental motor convoy, to determine if the country could manage to move large amounts of troops and equipment quickly over long distances. Brett's work with Eisenhower on this mission laid the framework for the Interstate Highway Act of 1956.

He commanded the Expeditionary Tank Force in 1923–1924 in Panama.

Brett remained in the U.S. Army through the lean interwar years, and was promoted to brigadier general in February 1942.

On June 3, 1941, he was designated the chief of staff of the Armored Force at Fort Knox, having previously served as chief of staff of the 1st Armored Division.

During World War II he served on the staff of the 5th Armored Division in 1942–1943 as it prepared for service in the European theatre, and was promoted to brigadier general in 1942, but retired from the army in October 1943 for medical reasons.

Brett died on September 9, 1952, in Santa Barbara, California. He and his wife, 2nd Lieutenant A.N.C. Elizabeth March Brett (1898–1981) are buried along with their son, Captain James Sereno Brett (1929–2020) at Arlington National Cemetery.

Brett donated his extensive collection of reports, diaries and memorandums, which include personal papers of General George S. Patton, to the University of North Dakota, Orin G. Libby Manuscript Collection. Among the important papers are personal diaries of Patton and Brett written during their deployment in France 1918, and reports of their tank operations at St. Mihiel and in the Meuse-Argonne.

== Decorations ==
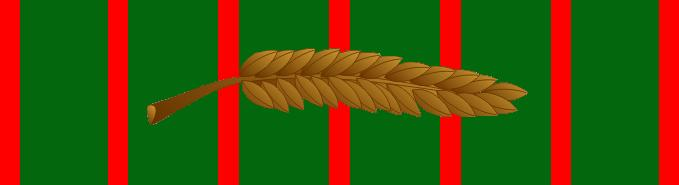

Rank History:

- May 1, 1916 Enlisted and Assigned Co K, 3rd Oregon Infantry (passed physical on May 5)
- June 26, 1916 Resigned from company to accept commission, 2nd Lt
- July 1, 1938 Lieutenant-Colonel
- March 6, 1941 Colonel (Army of the United States)
- February 15, 1942 Brigadier-General (Army of the United States)
- December 9, 1942 Termination of rank Brigadier-General (Army of the United States)
- October 31, 1943 Brigadier-General (Retired)

1st Row	Distinguished Service Cross		Army Distinguished Service Medal	Silver Star w/ Oak leaf cluster
2nd Row	Purple Heart w/ 2 Oak leaf clusters	Mexican Border Service Medal	World War I Victory Medal w/ four battle clasps	American Defense Service Medal
3rd Row	American Campaign Medal	World War II Victory Medal	Officer of the Legion of Honour	French Croix de guerre 1914–1918 w/ palm

== Bibliography ==
- Eisenhower, Dwight D. (1967). At Ease: Stories I tell To Friends. Eastern Acord Press
- Brett, Sereno Elmer (1920). Lumbering in national defense. Oregon State University undergraduate thesis Bachelor of Science (B.S.)
- Brett, Sereno Elmer (1922). Analysis and Criticism of Tactics Used at St Mihiel, Fort Benning Infantry School 1921-22 Company Commander Course
- Brett, Sereno Elmer (January 1930). Tank Reorganization. the Coastal Artillery Journal Volume 72, No 1
- Davies, Pete (2002) American Road: the Story of an Epic Transcontinental Journey at the Dawn of the Motor Age. Henry Holt and Company
- Venzon, Anne Cipriano (2013). The United States in the First World War: an Encyclopedia. Hoboken, NJ: Taylor and Francis. ISBN 978-1-135-68453-2. OCLC 865332376.
- Wilson, Dale E. (2018). Treat 'Em Rough: The Birth of American Armor 1917-20. Casemate Publishing

Military offices
Preceded by Jack W. Heard	Commanding General 5th Armored Division; 1942–1943	Succeeded by Lunsford E. Oliver
