= List of United States divisions during World War II =

Includes all branches of US military in World War II

The following is a list of U.S. Army and U.S. Marine Corps divisions of World War II. The United States began the war with only a handful of active divisions: five infantry and one cavalry. By the end of the war, the nation had fielded nearly one hundred. The number of divisions fielded by the United States Army in relation to the population and industrial capacity of the country and in comparison to the number of divisions fielded by various other Allied and Axis countries, has been called "the 90-Division Gamble". Due to the US Army's method of employment combined with events of the war, the United States did not suffer the destruction of any of its division-size units during the conflict, except for the Philippine Division in 1942.

Some divisions were "constituted" (placed on the rolls of the Army and contemplated for organization) but never activated, and "phantom" units were also "raised" on paper during the war to confuse the Germans.

== United States Army Divisions ==
The 82nd Airborne Division was originally the 82nd Infantry Division of the Organized Reserve, and after being ordered into active military service on 25 March 1942, was converted to an airborne division on 15 August 1942. The 101st Infantry Division was disbanded in the Organized Reserve on 15 August 1942, and was concurrently reconstituted and activated as an airborne division on the same date.

The 15th Airborne Division was constituted, but never activated. It was dropped from the mobilization program in 1943.

=== Airborne Divisions ===
Airborne Divisions
Shoulder Sleeve Insignia	Name	Headquarters organized Ordered into active military service or activated	Entered Combat	Days in Combat	Commanding General	Campaigns
	11th Airborne Division	25 February 1943	18 November 1944	204	Maj. Gen. Joseph M. Swing	New Guinea; Southern Philippines; Luzon
	13th Airborne Division	13 August 1943	No combat	-	Maj. Gen. Elbridge G. Chapman	-
	17th Airborne Division	15 April 1943	25 December 1944	45	Maj. Gen. William M. Miley	Ardennes-Alsace; Rhineland; Central Europe
	82nd Airborne Division	23 September 1921 25 March 1942	9 July 1943	422	Maj. Gen. Matthew B. Ridgway; Maj. Gen. James M. Gavin	Sicily; Naples-Foggia; Normandy; Rhineland; Ardennes-Alsace; Central Europe
	101st Airborne Division	10 September 1921 15 August 1942	6 June 1944	214	Maj. Gen. Maxwell D. Taylor; Brig. Gen. Anthony C. McAuliffe; Maj. Gen. Maxwell D. Taylor	Normandy; Rhineland; Ardennes-Alsace; Central Europe

=== Armored Divisions ===
The 19th Armored Division was constituted, but never activated. It was dropped from the mobilization program in 1943.

Armored Divisions
Shoulder Sleeve Insignia	Name	Activated	Entered Combat	Days in Combat	Commanding General	Campaigns
	1st Armored Division	15 July 1940	8 November 1942	360	Maj. Gen. Orlando Ward; Maj. Gen. Ernest N. Harmon; Maj. Gen. Vernon E. Prichard	Algeria-French Morocco; Tunisia; Naples-Foggia; Anzio; Rome-Arno; North Apennines; Po Valley
	2nd Armored Division	15 July 1940	8 November 1942	443	Maj. Gen. Hugh J. Gaffey; Maj. Gen. Edward H. Brooks; Maj. Gen. Ernest N. Harmon; Maj. Gen. Isaac D. White	Algeria-French Morocco; Sicily; Normandy; Northern France; Rhineland; Ardennes-Alsace; Central Europe
	3rd Armored Division	15 April 1941	9 July 1944	231	Maj. Gen. Leroy H. Watson; Maj. Gen. Maurice Rose^{(KIA)} Brig. Gen. Doyle O. Hickey	Normandy; Northern France; Rhineland; Ardennes-Alsace; Central Europe
	4th Armored Division	15 April 1941	28 July 1944	230	Maj. Gen. John S. Wood; Maj. Gen. Hugh J. Gaffey; Col. Walter A. Bigby; Brig. Gen. Holmes E. Dager; Maj. Gen. Hugh J. Gaffey; Maj. Gen. William M. Hoge	Normandy; Northern France; Rhineland; Ardennes-Alsace; Central Europe
	5th Armored Division	10 October 1941	2 August 1944	161	Maj. Gen. Lunsford E. Oliver	Normandy; Northern France; Rhineland; Ardennes-Alsace; Central Europe
	6th Armored Division	15 February 1942	28 July 1944	272	Maj. Gen. Robert W. Grow; Brig. Gen. George W. Read Jr.	Normandy; Northern France; Rhineland; Ardennes-Alsace; Central Europe
	7th Armored Division	1 March 1942	14 August 1944	172	Maj. Gen. Lindsay M. Silvester; Maj. Gen. Robert W. Hasbrouck	Northern France; Rhineland; Ardennes-Alsace; Central Europe
	8th Armored Division	1 April 1942	23 February 1945	63	Maj. Gen. John M. Devine	Ardennes-Alsace; Rhineland; Central Europe
	9th Armored Division	15 July 1942	16 December 1944	91	Maj. Gen. John W. Leonard	Ardennes-Alsace; Rhineland; Central Europe
	10th Armored Division	15 July 1942	1 November 1944	124	Maj. Gen. William H. H. Morris Jr.	Rhineland; Ardennes-Alsace; Central Europe
	11th Armored Division	15 August 1942	23 December 1944	96	Brig. Gen. Charles S. Kilburn; Maj. Gen. Holmes E. Dager	Ardennes-Alsace; Rhineland; Central Europe
	12th Armored Division	15 September 1942	7 December 1944	102	Maj. Gen. Roderick R. Allen	Rhineland; Central Europe
	13th Armored Division	15 October 1942	10 April 1945	16	Maj. Gen. John B. Wogan; Maj. Gen. John Millikin	Rhineland; Central Europe
	14th Armored Division	15 November 1942	20 November 1944	167	Maj. Gen. Albert C. Smith	Rhineland; Central Europe
	16th Armored Division	15 July 1943	5 May 1945	3	Brig. Gen. John L. Pierce	Central Europe
	20th Armored Division	15 March 1943	24 April 1945	8	Maj. Gen. Orlando Ward	Central Europe

=== Cavalry Divisions ===
Cavalry Divisions
Shoulder Sleeve Insignia	Name	Activated	Entered Combat	Days in Combat	Commanding General	Campaigns
	1st Cavalry Division	31 August 1921	29 February 1944	521	Maj. Gen. Verne D. Mudge; Brig. Gen. Hugh F. T. Hoffman; Maj. Gen. William C. Chase	New Guinea; Bismarck Archipelago; Leyte; Luzon
	2nd Cavalry Division	1 April 1941 25 February 1943 as segregated division	No combat	-	Brig. Gen. Terry de la Mesa Allen Sr. Brig. Gen. John Millikin; Brig. Gen. John B. Coulter Maj. Gen. Harry H. Johnson	1st inactivation: 15 July 1942 2nd inactivation: 10 May 1944

=== Infantry Divisions ===
==== 1st to 25th ====
Infantry divisions were initially titled with their numerical designation and "division" (e.g., "1st Division"). In August 1941, the War Department issued a statement that divisions' names were to represent their major arm of service (i.e., armored, cavalry, or infantry) to avoid confusion as several divisions of different arms now shared the same number. Some divisions issued general orders introducing "infantry" as an official part of their names, but this change was not added to the table of organization of the infantry division, which technically controlled its naming conventions, until 1 August 1942.

The 1st through 25th Infantry Divisions, excepting the 10th Mountain Division, were raised in the Regular Army or the Army of the United States prior to American involvement in World War II. Because of funding cuts, in September 1921, the 4th through 9th Infantry Divisions were mostly inactivated. Within a few years, the headquarters of the 1st and 3rd Infantry Divisions "almost ceased to exist. Only the division commander and a few staff officers remained to carry out minimal division administrative functions, and neither division exercised true command functions over their units." The 2nd Infantry Division remained the most functional stateside division, as it was concentrated entirely at Fort Sam Houston, Texas. By the mid-1920s, most of the divisions' inactive units were staffed with Organized Reserve officers as "Regular Army Inactive" units.

The Hawaiian Division, "which was the closest thing to a full-strength division in the interwar American Army." was split on 1 October 1941 to create the 24th and 25th Infantry Divisions. The 24th Infantry Division headquarters inherited the lineage of the Hawaiian Division's headquarters, while the 25th Infantry Division was raised in the Army of the United States.

The 10th Mountain Division was raised in the Army of the United States in 1943.

Infantry Divisions
Shoulder Sleeve Insignia	Name	Activated	Entered Combat	Days in Combat	Commanding General	Campaigns
	1st Infantry Division	17 May 1917	8 November 1942	443	Maj. Gen. Terry de la Mesa Allen Sr. Maj. Gen. Clarence R. Huebner; Maj. Gen. Clift Andrus	Algeria-French Morocco; Tunisia; Sicily; Normandy; Northern France; Rhineland; Ardennes-Alsace; Central Europe
	2nd Infantry Division	26 October 1917	12 June 1944	303	Maj. Gen. Walter M. Robertson	Normandy; Northern France; Rhineland; Ardennes-Alsace; Central Europe
	3rd Infantry Division	12 November 1917	8 November 1942	536	Maj. Gen. Jonathan W. Anderson; Maj. Gen. Lucian K. Truscott Jr. Maj. Gen. John W. O'Daniel	Algeria-French Morocco; Sicily; Naples-Foggia; Anzio; Rome-Arno; Southern France; Rhineland; Ardennes-Alsace; Central Europe
	4th Infantry Division	10 December 1917 3 June 1940	6 June 1944	299	Maj. Gen. Raymond O. Barton; Maj. Gen. Harold R. Bull; Brig. Gen. James A. Van Fleet; Maj. Gen. Harold W. Blakeley	Normandy; Northern France; Rhineland; Ardennes-Alsace; Central Europe
	5th Infantry Division	11 December 1917 2 October 1939	16 July 1944	270	Maj. Gen. Stafford LeRoy Irwin; Maj. Gen. Albert E. Brown	Normandy; Northern France; Rhineland; Ardennes-Alsace; Central Europe
	6th Infantry Division	November 1917 12 October 1939	14 June 1944	306	Maj. Gen. Franklin C. Sibert; Maj. Gen. Edwin D. Patrick^{(KIA)} Maj. Gen. Charles E. Hurdis	New Guinea; Luzon
	7th Infantry Division	6 December 1917 1 July 1940	11 May 1943	208	Maj. Gen. Eugene M. Landrum; Maj. Gen. Archibald V. Arnold; Maj. Gen. Charles H. Corlett	Aleutian Islands; Eastern Mandates; Leyte; Ryukyus
	8th Infantry Division	January 1918 1 July 1940	8 July 1944	266	Maj. Gen. William C. McMahon; Maj. Gen. Donald A. Stroh; Maj. Gen. William G. Weaver; Maj. Gen. Bryant E. Moore	Normandy; Northern France; Rhineland; Central Europe
	9th Infantry Division	18 July 1918 1 August 1940	8 November 1942	304	Maj. Gen. Manton S. Eddy; Maj. Gen. Louis A. Craig	Algeria-French Morocco; Tunisia; Sicily; Normandy; Northern France; Rhineland; Ardennes-Alsace; Central Europe
	10th Mountain Division	15 July 1943	8 January 1945	114	Maj. Gen. George P. Hays	North Apennines; Po Valley
	11th Infantry Division	1918; 1941 (phantom in WWII)	Did not see combat	–	–	–
	24th Infantry Division	25 February 1921 (as Hawaiian Division) 1 October 1941 (as 24th Infantry Division)	7 December 1941 (22 April 1944 was the first offensive action of the division)	210	Maj. Gen. Frederick A. Irving; Maj. Gen. Roscoe B. Woodruff	Central Pacific; New Guinea; Leyte; Luzon; Southern Philippines
	25th Infantry Division	1 October 1941	7 December 1941 (10 January 1943 was the first offensive action of the Division)	165 (consecutive days; exact unknown)	Maj. Gen. J. Lawton Collins; Maj. Gen. Charles L. Mullins Jr.	Central Pacific; Guadalcanal; Northern Solomons; Luzon

==== 26th to 45th ====
The 26th through 45th Divisions, with the exception of the 39th and 42nd Divisions, were raised in the National Guard during and after World War I. In postwar mobilization plans, the 26th through 45th Divisions, less two, were allotted to the National Guard. The 30th, 31st, and 39th Divisions had been organized in what would become the states of the Fourth Corps Area; the designations of the 30th and 39th Divisions were originally selected, with the 31st Division being deleted. In 1923, the adjutants general of the states concerned successfully requested that the War Department change the designation of the 39th Division to the 31st Division and adjust allotments of units accordingly. The 42nd Division was the second division deleted from the mobilization program as it had contained units from twenty-six states and the District of Columbia, although it would be reconstituted during the war as a division in the Army of the United States.

Infantry Divisions
Shoulder Sleeve Insignia	Name (National Guard units from)	Headquarters organized Ordered into federal service	Entered Combat	Days in Combat	Commanding General	Campaigns
	26th Infantry Division (Massachusetts)	21 March 1923 16 January 1941	12 October 1944	210	Maj. Gen. Willard S. Paul	Northern France; Rhineland; Ardennes-Alsace; Central Europe
	27th Infantry Division (New York)	23 December 1921 15 October 1940	21 November 1943	110	Maj. Gen. Ralph C. Smith; Maj. Gen. George W. Griner Jr.	Central Pacific; Eastern Mandates; Western Pacific; Ryukyus
	28th Infantry Division (Pennsylvania)	22 December 1921 17 February 1941	27 July 1944	196	Maj. Gen. Lloyd D. Brown; Brig. Gen. James E. Wharton^{(KIA)} Maj. Gen. Norman D. Cota	Normandy; Northern France; Rhineland; Ardennes-Alsace; Central Europe
	29th Infantry Division (District of Columbia, Maryland, Pennsylvania, and Virginia)	31 July 1923 3 February 1941	6 June 1944	242	Maj. Gen. Charles H. Gerhardt	Normandy; Northern France; Rhineland; Central Europe
	30th Infantry Division (Georgia, North Carolina, South Carolina, and Tennessee)	24 August 1926 16 September 1940	15 July 1944	282	Maj. Gen. Leland S. Hobbs	Normandy; Northern France; Rhineland; Ardennes-Alsace; Central Europe
	31st Infantry Division (Alabama, Florida, Louisiana, and Mississippi)	15 October 1924 25 November 1940	3 July 1944	245	Maj. Gen. John C. Persons; Maj. Gen. Clarence A. Martin	New Guinea; Southern Philippines
	32nd Infantry Division (Michigan and Wisconsin)	24 July 1924 15 October 1940	2 October 1942	654	Maj. Gen. Edwin F. Harding; Maj. Gen. William H. Gill	Papua; New Guinea; Leyte; Luzon
	33rd Infantry Division (Illinois)	13 December 1923 5 March 1941	1 September 1944	139	Maj. Gen. Percy W. Clarkson	New Guinea; Luzon
	34th Infantry Division (Iowa, Minnesota, North Dakota, and South Dakota)	14 July 1924 10 February 1941	8 November 1942	517 (Some elements credited with over 600)	Maj. Gen. Charles W. Ryder; Maj. Gen. Charles L. Bolte	Algeria-French Morocco; Tunisia; Naples-Foggia; Anzio; Rome-Arno; North Apennines; Po Valley
	35th Infantry Division (Kansas, Missouri, and Nebraska)	13 September 1935 23 December 1940	11 July 1944	264	Maj. Gen. Paul W. Baade	Normandy; Northern France; Rhineland; Ardennes-Alsace; Central Europe
	36th Infantry Division (Texas)	2 May 1923 25 November 1940	9 September 1943	400	Maj. Gen. Fred L. Walker; Maj. Gen. John E. Dahlquist	Naples-Foggia; Anzio; Rome-Arno; Southern France; Rhineland; Central Europe
	37th Infantry Division (Ohio)	31 May 1923 15 October 1940	5 July 1943	592	Maj. Gen. Robert S. Beightler	Northern Solomons; Luzon
	38th Infantry Division (Indiana, Kentucky, and West Virginia)	16 March 1923 17 January 1941	11 July 1944	210	Maj. Gen. Henry L. C. Jones; Maj. Gen. William C. Chase; Maj. Gen. Frederick A. Irving	New Guinea; Leyte; Luzon
	40th Infantry Division (California, Nevada, and Utah)	18 June 1926 3 March 1941	24 April 1944	265	Maj. Gen. Rapp Brush; Maj. Gen. Donald J. Myers	Bismarck Archipelago; Luzon; Southern Philippines
	41st Infantry Division (Idaho, Montana, Oregon, Washington, and Wyoming)	3 January 1930 16 September 1940	2 January 1943	380	Maj. Gen. Horace H. Fuller; Maj. Gen. Jens A. Doe	Papua; New Guinea; Southern Philippines
	42nd Infantry Division (The 42nd Infantry Division was a reconstitution of the National Guard's 42nd Division that had fought in World War I, but was raised in the Army of the United States rather than in the National Guard)	14 July 1943	24 January 1944	106	Maj. Gen. Harry J. Collins	Rhineland; Central Europe
	43rd Infantry Division (Connecticut, Maine, Rhode Island, and Vermont)	21 March 1925 24 February 1941	17 February 1943	370	Maj. Gen. John H. Hester; Maj. Gen. Leonard F. Wing	Northern Solomons; New Guinea; Luzon
	44th Infantry Division (Delaware, New Jersey, and New York)	26 March 1924 16 September 1940	24 October 1944	190	Maj. Gen. Robert L. Spragins; Maj. Gen. William F. Dean	Northern France; Rhineland; Central Europe
	45th Infantry Division (Arizona, Colorado, New Mexico, and Oklahoma)	3 August 1923 16 September 1940	10 July 1943	511	Maj. Gen. William W. Eagles; Maj. Gen. Robert T. Frederick	Sicily; Naples-Foggia; Anzio; Rome-Arno; Southern France; Rhineland; Central Europe
	Americal Division (Composite task force later reorganized as a division)	27 May 1942	13 October 1942	600	Maj. Gen. Alexander M. Patch; Maj. Gen. John R. Hodge; Maj. Gen. Robert B. McClure; Maj. Gen. William H. Arnold	Guadalcanal; Northern Solomons; Leyte; Southern Philippines

==== 63rd to 89th ====
After World War I, 33 infantry divisions (the 76th through 104th) were organized as part of the Organized Reserve. They were nominally regional organizations, drawing their officer cadre and a small, nearly insignificant, number of enlisted men from an allotted portion of a state, entire state, or multiple states, similar to National Guard units. Prior to American involvement in World War II, Organized Reserve officers were called to active duty individually and assigned to existing Regular Army and National Guard units. When the Organized Reserve units themselves were called to active duty beginning in 1942, "few of the Reserve officers originally assigned to...units were available for duty with them. Consequently, the units as activated bore small resemblance to those of peacetime."

The 61st, 62nd, 67th, 68th, and 72nd-74th Infantry Divisions were constituted, but never activated. They were dropped from the mobilization program in 1943.

Infantry Divisions
Shoulder Sleeve Insignia	Name	Headquarters organized Ordered into active military service or activated	Entered Combat	Days in Combat	Commanding General	Campaigns
	63rd Infantry Division	15 June 1943	22 December 1944	119	Maj. Gen. Louis E. Hibbs	Rhineland; Central Europe
	65th Infantry Division	16 August 1943	9 March 1945	55	Maj. Gen. Stanley E. Reinhart	Rhineland; Central Europe
	66th Infantry Division	15 April 1943	1 January 1945	91	Maj. Gen. Herman F. Kramer	Northern France
	69th Infantry Division	15 May 1943	11 February 1945	86	Maj. Gen. Emil F. Reinhardt	Rhineland; Central Europe
	70th Infantry Division	15 June 1943	3 February 1945	83	Maj. Gen. Allison J. Barnett	Rhineland; Central Europe
	71st Infantry Division	15 July 1943	12 March 1945	62	Maj. Gen. Willard G. Wyman	Rhineland; Central Europe
	75th Infantry Division	15 April 1943	25 December 1944	94	Maj. Gen. Fay B. Prickett; Maj. Gen. Ray E. Porter	Ardennes-Alsace; Rhineland; Central Europe
	76th Infantry Division	1 September 1921 15 June 1942	19 January 1945	107	Maj. Gen. William R. Schmidt	Rhineland; Ardennes-Alsace; Central Europe
	77th Infantry Division	1 July 1921 25 March 1942	21 July 1944	208	Maj. Gen. Andrew D. Bruce	Western Pacific; Leyte; Ryukyus
	78th Infantry Division	1 July 1921 15 August 1942	13 December 1944	125	Maj. Gen. Edwin P. Parker Jr.	Rhineland; Ardennes-Alsace; Central Europe
	79th Infantry Division	29 September 1921 15 June 1942	19 June 1944	248	Maj. Gen. Ira T. Wyche	Normandy; Northern France; Rhineland; Central Europe
	80th Infantry Division	1 September 1921 15 July 1942	8 August 1944	289	Maj. Gen. Horace L. McBride	Northern France; Rhineland; Ardennes-Alsace; Central Europe
	81st Infantry Division	23 September 1921 15 June 1942	17 September 1944	166	Maj. Gen. Paul J. Mueller	Western Pacific; South Philippines
	83rd Infantry Division	27 September 1921 15 August 1942	27 June 1944	244	Maj. Gen. Robert C. Macon	Normandy; Northern France; Rhineland; Ardennes-Alsace; Central Europe
	84th Infantry Division	6 September 1921 15 October 1942	18 November 1944	170	Maj. Gen. Alexander R. Bolling	Rhineland; Ardennes-Alsace; Central Europe
	85th Infantry Division	10 September 1921 15 May 1942	10 April 1944	260	Maj. Gen. John B. Coulter	Rome-Arno; North Apennines; Po Valley
	86th Infantry Division	10 September 1921 15 December 1942	29 March 1945	34	Maj. Gen. Harris M. Melasky	Central Europe
	87th Infantry Division	23 September 1921 15 December 1942	13 December 1944	134	Maj. Gen. Frank L. Culin Jr.	Rhineland; Ardennes-Alsace; Central Europe
	88th Infantry Division	2 September 1921 15 July 1942	3 January 1944	307	Maj. Gen. John E. Sloan; Maj. Gen. Paul W. Kendall	Rome-Arno; North Apennines; Po Valley
	89th Infantry Division	2 September 1921 15 July 1942	12 March 1945	57	Maj. Gen. Thomas D. Finley	Rhineland; Central Europe

==== 90th to 106th ====
The 105th and 107th Infantry Divisions were constituted, but never activated. They were intended as additional segregated African American divisions. They were dropped from the mobilization program in 1943.

Infantry Divisions
Shoulder Sleeve Insignia	Name	Activated	Entered Combat	Days in Combat	Commanding General	Campaigns
	90th Infantry Division	8 August 1921 25 March 1942	6 June 1944	307	Brig. Gen. Jay W. MacKelvie; Maj. Gen. Eugene M. Landrum; Maj. Gen. Raymond S. McLain; Maj. Gen. James A. Van Fleet; Maj. Gen. Lowell Ward Rooks; Maj. Gen. Herbert L. Earnest	Normandy; Northern France; Rhineland; Ardennes-Alsace; Central Europe
	91st Infantry Division	November 1921 15 August 1942	12 July 1944	271	Maj. Gen. William G. Livesay	Rome-Arno; North Apennines; Po Valley
	92nd Infantry Division (Segregated division)	15 October 1942	24 August 1944	200	Maj. Gen. Edward M. Almond	North Apennines; Po Valley
	93rd Infantry Division (Segregated division)	15 May 1942	30 March 1944	133	Maj. Gen. Raymond G. Lehman; Maj. Gen. Harry H. Johnson	New Guinea; Northern Solomons; Bismarck Archipelago
	94th Infantry Division	November 1921 15 September 1942	17 September 1944	209	Maj. Gen. Harry J. Malony	Northern France; Rhineland; Ardennes-Alsace; Central Europe
	95th Infantry Division	31 August 1921 15 July 1942	20 October 1944	151	Maj. Gen. Harry L. Twaddle	Northern France; Rhineland; Central Europe
	96th Infantry Division	7 October 1921 15 August 1942	20 October 1944	200	Maj. Gen. James L. Bradley	Leyte; Ryukyus
	97th Infantry Division	December 1921 25 February 1943	1 April 1945	41	Maj. Gen. Milton B. Halsey	Central Europe
	98th Infantry Division	18 August 1921 15 September 1942	No combat	-	Maj. Gen. George W. Griner Jr. Maj. Gen. Ralph C. Smith	-
	99th Infantry Division	November 1921 15 November 1942	9 November 1944	151	Maj. Gen. Walter E. Lauer	Rhineland; Ardennes-Alsace; Central Europe
	100th Infantry Division	27 September 1921 15 November 1942	9 November 1944	163	Maj. Gen. Withers A. Burress	Rhineland; Central Europe
	102nd Infantry Division	2 September 1921 15 September 1942	26 November 1944	173	Maj. Gen. Frank A. Keating	Rhineland; Central Europe
	103rd Infantry Division	31 August 1921 15 November 1942	11 November 1944	147	Maj. Gen. Charles C. Hoffner Jr. Maj. Gen. Anthony C. McAuliffe	Rhineland; Central Europe
	104th Infantry Division	7 October 1921 15 September 1942	24 October 1944	200	Maj. Gen. Terry de la Mesa Allen Sr.	Northern France; Rhineland; Central Europe
	106th Infantry Division	15 March 1943	10 December 1944	63	Maj. Gen. Alan W. Jones; Brig. Gen. Herbert T. Perrin; Maj. Gen. Donald A. Stroh	Ardennes–Alsace; Rhineland; Central Europe
	Philippine Division	8 June 1921	8 December 1941	124	Maj. Gen. Jonathan M. Wainwright; Brig. Gen. Maxon S. Lough	Philippine Islands (surrendered 10 April 1942)

== United States Marine Corps Divisions ==
Marine Divisions
Shoulder Sleeve Insignia	Name	Activated	Entered Combat	Days in Combat	Commanding General	Campaigns
	1st Marine Division	1 February 1941	7 August 1942	265	Maj. Gen. Alexander Vandegrift; Maj. Gen. William H. Rupertus; Maj. Gen. Pedro del Valle; Maj. Gen. DeWitt Peck	Guadalcanal-Tulagi landings; Capture and defense of Guadalcanal; Cape Gloucester, New Britain; Capture and occupation of southern Palau Islands; Assault and occupation of Okinawa Gunto
	2nd Marine Division	1 February 1941	4 January 1943	89	Maj. Gen. Charles F. B. Price; Maj. Gen. John Marston; Maj. Gen. Julian C. Smith; Maj. Gen. Thomas E. Watson; Maj. Gen. LeRoy P. Hunt	Capture and defense of Guadalcanal; Gilbert Islands (Tarawa) operation; Capture and occupation of Saipan; Capture and occupation of Tinian; Assault and occupation of Okinawa Gunto
	3rd Marine Division	16 September 1942	1 November 1943	104	Maj. Gen. Charles D. Barrett; Maj. Gen. Allen H. Turnage; Maj. Gen. Graves B. Erskine	Occupation and defense of Cape Torokina; Consolidation of Northern Solomons; Capture and occupation of Guam; Assault and occupation of Iwo Jima
	4th Marine Division	16 August 1943	31 January 1944	71	Brig. Gen. James L. Underhill; Maj. Gen. Harry Schmidt; Maj. Gen. Clifton B. Cates	Occupation of Kwajalein and Majuro Atolls; Capture and occupation of Saipan; Capture and occupation of Tinian; Assault and occupation of Iwo Jima
	5th Marine Division	21 January 1944	19 February 1945	36	Maj. Gen. Keller E. Rockey; Maj. Gen. Thomas E. Bourke	Assault and occupation of Iwo Jima
	6th Marine Division	7 September 1944	1 April 1945	82	Maj. Gen. Lemuel C. Shepherd Jr.	Assault and occupation of Okinawa Gunto

== See also ==
Allies:

- List of Australian divisions in World War II
- List of British divisions in World War II
- List of Canadian divisions in World War II
- List of French divisions in World War II
- List of Indian divisions in World War II
- List of Polish divisions in World War II
- List of Soviet divisions 1917–45

Axis:

- List of Finnish divisions in the Continuation War
- List of German military units of World War II
- List of Italian divisions in World War II
- List of Japanese Infantry divisions
