= Roddie Edmonds =

American infantryman and WWII POW honored as Righteous Among the Nations

Righteous Among the Nations Roddie Edmonds
- Born: Roderick Waring Edmonds; August 20, 1919; South Knoxville, Tennessee, U.S.
- Died: August 8, 1985 (aged 65); Knoxville, Tennessee, U.S.
- Burial place: Berry Highland Memorial Cemetery, Knoxville, Tennessee
- Military career
- Allegiance: United States
- Branch: United States Army
- Rank: Master sergeant
- Units: 106th Infantry Division, 422nd Infantry Regiment
- Conflicts: World War II; Battle of the Bulge (POW); Korean War
- Awards: Medal of Honor; Bronze Star Medal; Prisoner of War Medal

Roderick 'Roddie' Waring Edmonds (August 20, 1919 – August 8, 1985), was a U.S. Army infantryman renowned for his courageous stand during World War II. As the highest-ranking American non-commissioned officer captured by German forces in December 1944, Edmonds was interned at Stalag IX-A, (Note: Not to be confused with Stalag XI-A.) a prisoner-of-war camp in Ziegenhain, Germany. On January 27, 1945, Edmonds refused an order by German officers to identify American Jewish soldiers, possibly for separate execution, instead defiantly declaring that "We are all Jews here." The captors relented, sparing the lives of up to 300 Jewish prisoners of war.

In risking his own life to save his Jewish comrades, Edmonds' actions exemplified profound moral courage and leadership. He was posthumously recognized by Yad Vashem as "Righteous Among the Nations," the only American serviceman to receive this honor. (Note: The "Righteous Among the Nations" honor is an award presented to non-Jewish people by Israel for people like Edmonds that risked their lives to protect Jewish people during the Holocaust.) (Note: Edmonds is the most recent American to receive the honor, and the only one to serve as an active serviceman during World War II.) Edmonds' actions are widely recognized as sincere, highlighting the enduring power of individual conscience in the face of structural evil. President Obama praised Edmonds during a speech in 2016 at the Israeli Embassy in Washington. In 2026, he was posthumously awarded the Medal of Honor by President of the United States Donald Trump.

== Early life and education ==
Roderick W. "Roddie" Edmonds was born in 1919 in South Knoxville, Tennessee, and graduated from Knoxville High in 1938. Some sources, including the 1930 Federal census and the posthumous act awarding him the Congressional Gold Medal, spell his given name "Rodrick". He had three brothers: Thomas "Shake" Edmonds Jr., Leon Edmonds, and Robert Edmonds. He grew up attending a Methodist church in South Knoxville. He was married three times, the first two marriages ending in divorce: Marie Solomon (1942); Pauline Flora Surratt (1948); Mary Ann Watson (1953), to whom he was married at the time of his death. He had two sons: Kim Michael and Christopher W. Edmonds.

== Military career ==
=== World War II ===
At age 22, Edmonds enlisted in the Army on March 17, 1941, at Fort Oglethorpe in Georgia.

Edmonds, along with other inexperienced troops, arrived in the European Theater of Operations in December 1944, with the 106th Infantry Division, arriving only five days before Germany launched a massive counteroffensive, the Battle of the Bulge. During the battle, where much of the division was overrun, on December 19, 1944, Edmonds was captured and sent to Stalag IX-B, a German prisoner-of-war (POW) camp. Shortly thereafter, he was transferred, with other enlisted personnel, to another POW camp near Ziegenhain, Germany: Stalag IX-A. As the highest ranking soldier at the new camp, Master Sergeant Edmonds was in command, responsible for the camp's 1,275 American POWs.

On their first day in Stalag IX-A, January 27, 1945—as Germany's defeat was clearly approaching—Commandant Siegmann ordered Edmonds to tell only the American Jewish soldiers to present themselves at the next morning's assembly so they could be separated from the other prisoners.

Instead, Edmonds ordered all 1,275 POWs to assemble outside their barracks. The German commandant rushed up to Edmonds in a fury, placed his pistol against Edmonds's head and demanded that he identify the Jewish soldiers under his command. Instead, Edmonds responded, "We are all Jews here," and told the commandant that if he wanted to shoot the Jews he would have to shoot all of the prisoners. He then warned the commandant that if he harmed any of Edmonds' men, the commandant would be prosecuted for war crimes after the conflict ended—since the Geneva Conventions required prisoners to give only their name, rank, and serial number; religion was not required. The commandant backed down. Edmonds' actions are credited with saving up to 300 Jewish soldiers from possible death. After 100 days of captivity, Edmonds returned home after the war, but kept the event at the POW camp to himself.

== Post-war life and death ==
Edmonds never told his family of the event at the POW camp. He was again recruited to service during the Korean War where he served with the 1st Cavalry Division. After returning from Korea, he worked variously for The Knoxville Journal and in sales related to mobile homes and cable television.

He died in 1985, never having received any official recognition, citation or medal for his defense of the Jewish POWs.

== Recognition and legacy ==
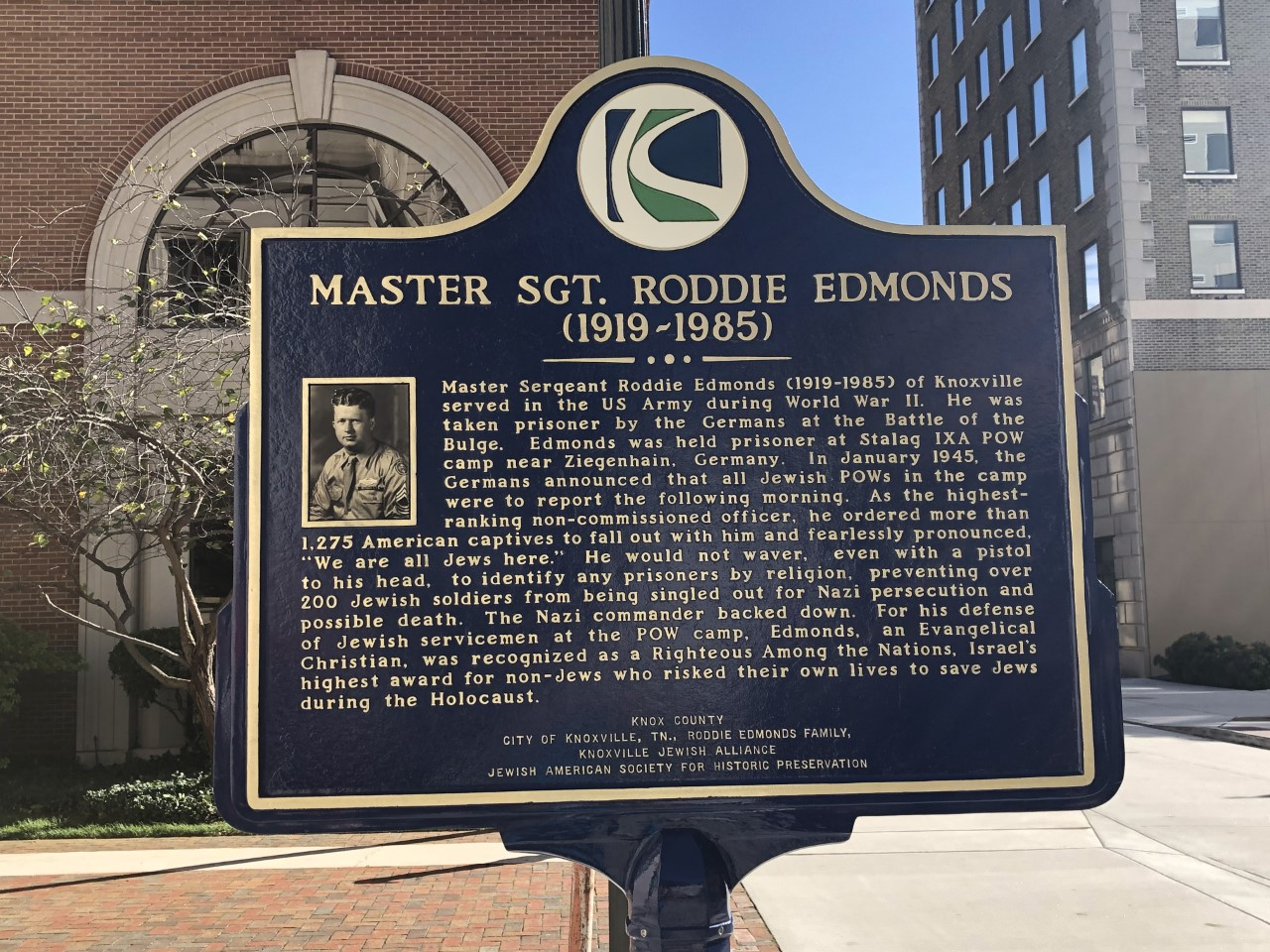
Historical Marker, Knoxville, for Roddie Edmonds

After his death in 1985, Edmonds' wife gave his son, Chris Edmonds, several of the diaries his father had kept while in the POW camp. Chris Edmonds, a Baptist minister, began researching his story, and stumbled upon a mention of the event at the POW camp. He located several of the Jewish soldiers his father saved, who provided witness statements to Yad Vashem. Among the Jewish POWs who were saved was Sonny Fox, an American television host and executive, who witnessed and later recounted Edmonds' actions.

On February 10, 2015, Yad Vashem recognized Edmonds as "Righteous Among the Nations," Israel's highest honor for non-Jews who risked their lives to save Jews during the Holocaust. The awards ceremony was held January 27, 2016, at the Israeli embassy in Washington, D.C., where the then-President Barack Obama praised Edmonds for action "above and beyond the call of duty," and echoed Edmonds' statement of solidarity with Jews. Chris Edmonds received the Righteous medal and certificate of honor from Israeli Ambassador Ron Dermer and Yad Vashem Council Chairman Rabbi Lau on his father's behalf at the ceremony.

"…Edmonds seemed like an ordinary American soldier, but he had an extraordinary sense of responsibility and dedication to his fellow human beings," Yad Vashem Chairman Avner Shalev.

Chris Edmonds has sought to have his father's bravery recognized with the Medal of Honor. However, the initial U.S. Army position has been that he was a captive, and therefore ineligible because his actions were not in combat.

To overcome this obstacle, on March 23, 2016, in the U. S. House of Representatives, Rep. John J. Duncan Jr. (R-TN-2) introduced H.R. 4863, the "Roddie Edmonds Congressional Gold Medal Act" bill. The bill's original purpose was to recognize Edmonds with a Congressional Gold Medal, one of the two highest civilian awards in the United States (along with the Presidential Medal of Freedom). It was referred to the House Armed Services Committee, from where it was referred, on April 5, 2016, to the Subcommittee on Military Personnel.

On February 13, 2017, in the U. S. Senate, members from Edmonds's home state of Tennessee—U.S. Senators Lamar Alexander (R-TN) and Bob Corker (R-TN), joined by Senators Tim Kaine (D-VA) and Ben Cardin (D-MD)—introduced a bill to have Sergeant Edmonds honored with the Congressional Gold Medal. The effort was renewed on April 21, 2021, with US Representative Tim Burchett (TN) introducing the "Master Sergeant Roddie Edmonds Congressional Gold Medal Act". A companion bill was also introduced in the US Senate.

A historical marker honoring Edmonds was placed in Knoxville, Tennessee, on November 15, 2020. It was donated by the Jewish American Society for Historic Preservation, with support from the Knoxville Jewish Alliance.

On March 2, 2026, President Donald Trump awarded Edmonds the Medal of Honor. His son Chris received it on his behalf.

== Awards and decorations ==

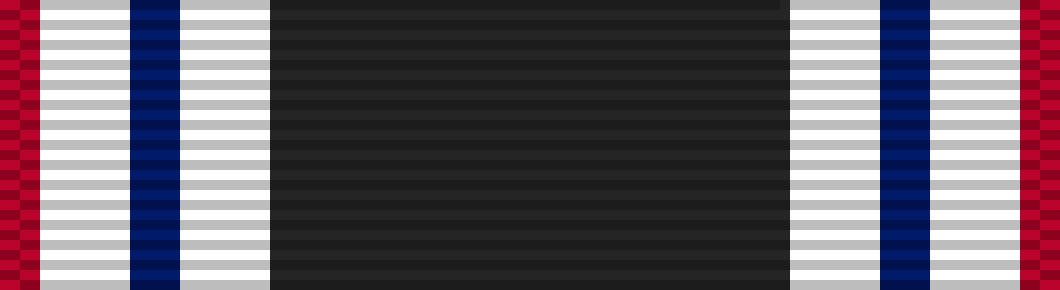

Badge	Combat Infantryman Badge with star denoting 2nd award		
1st row	Medal of Honor Retroactively Awarded, 2026	Bronze Star Medal Retroactively Awarded, 1947	Prisoner of War Medal Retroactively Awarded, 1985
2nd row	Army Good Conduct Medal	American Defense Service Medal	American Campaign Medal
3rd row	European–African–Middle Eastern Campaign Medal with 3 Campaign stars	World War II Victory Medal	National Defense Service Medal
4th row	Korean Service Medal with 5 Campaign stars	United Nations Service Medal Korea	Korean War Service Medal Retroactively Awarded, 2003
Unit awards	Presidential Unit Citation		Korean Presidential Unit Citation

=== Patches ===

106th Infantry Division Insignia	1st Cavalry Division Insignia

=== Medal of Honor citation ===
Edmonds' Medal of Honor citation reads:

Rank and organization: Master Sergeant, U.S. Army. Place and date: Ziegenhain, Germany, January 27, 1945, to March 30, 1945.

Citation:

Master Sergeant Roderick W. Edmonds distinguished himself by acts of gallantry and intrepidity above and beyond the call of duty from January 27, 1945, to March 30, 1945, as a prisoner of war in Germany, while assigned to Headquarters and Headquarters Company, 422d Infantry Regiment, 106th Infantry Division. Upon arrival at Stalag IXA in Ziegenhain, Germany, he was soon put to the test as Senior Non-Commissioned Officer. On the evening of January 26, 1945, the Germans announced that only Jewish-American prisoners would fall out for roll call the following morning, at the threat of execution. Master Sergeant Edmonds quickly understood that segregating more than 200 Jewish-American prisoners of war would likely result in their persecution and possible death, so he directed his senior leaders to have all 1,200 American prisoners present themselves for roll call. The following morning, the Nazi Commandant became incredulous after realizing that so many Americans were standing in formation. Master Sergeant Edmonds bravely resisted his fury, while also recounting the rights afforded to all prisoners under the Geneva Convention. Still enraged, the Commandant removed his pistol, pressed it hard against Master Sergeant Edmonds' forehead between his eyes and demanded that he order all Jewish-American prisoners to step forward, or he would be shot. With unwavering courage at the risk of his life, above and beyond the call of duty, Master Sergeant Edmonds fearlessly held his ground, refusing to concede and verbally warned the Commandant that if he executed him, he would be prosecuted for war crimes once the war was over. Finally, the Commandant, who was visibly reddened with anger, lowered his weapon and returned to his office without further attempts to segregate the Jewish-American prisoners. Master Sergeant Edmonds' actions inspired his fellow prisoners of war. Several weeks later, in March 1945, as Allied forces were rapidly advancing toward the area, the Germans ordered all prisoners to assemble outside the barracks for evacuation farther east to another camp. Fully intending to undermine his enemy captors, Master Sergeant Edmonds ordered all American prisoners to form in front of the barracks, and when the enemy transports arrived, they would break ranks and rush back to their barracks. Without regard for his own life Master Sergeant Edmonds gallantly led these prisoners in a relentless pursuit of opposition and resistance, forcing the Germans to abandon the camp leaving the 1,200 American prisoners behind. The full extent of his bravery, unbending will, and courageous leadership would be realized when soldiers from 3d U.S. Army liberated the camp on March 30, 1945. Master Sergeant Edmonds' conspicuous gallantry and intrepidity at the risk of his life, above and beyond the call of duty, are in keeping with the highest traditions of military service and reflect great credit upon himself, his unit, and the United States Army.

== See also ==
- List of Medal of Honor recipients for World War II
- 106th Infantry Division (United States)
