= William Stringfellow =

American lawyer

- Stringfellow at his Block Island home, among his books, artwork, and circus memorabilia
- Born: Frank William Stringfellow; April 28, 1928; Johnston, Rhode Island, US
- Died: March 2, 1985 (aged 56); Block Island, Rhode Island, US
- Occupations: Theologian; lawyer; activist
- Partner: Anthony Towne

Scholarly background
- Education: Bates College; Harvard University
- Influences: Karl Barth; Jacques Ellul

Scholarly work
- Discipline: Theology
- Sub-discipline: Moral theology
- School or tradition: Anglicanism; neo-orthodoxy
- Influenced: John Dear; Nathan Schneider; Jim Wallis; Walter Wink

Frank William Stringfellow (April 28, 1928 – March 2, 1985) was an American lay theologian, lawyer and social activist who was active mostly during the 1960s and 1970s.

== Life and career ==
=== Early life and education ===
Born in Johnston, Rhode Island, on April 26, 1928, he grew up in Northampton, Massachusetts, and graduated from Northampton High School in 1945. He managed to obtain several scholarships and entered Bates College in Lewiston, Maine, at the age of fifteen. He later earned a scholarship to the London School of Economics and served in the US 2nd Armored Division. Stringfellow then attended Harvard Law School. After his graduation, he moved to a slum tenement in Harlem, New York City, to work among poor African Americans and Hispanics.

=== Activism ===
His career of activism can be traced to his junior year at Bates, when he organized a sit-in at a local Maine restaurant that refused to serve people of color. It was his first foray into social activism, and he never looked back. Just a few years later, Stringfellow gained a reputation as a strident critic of the social, military and economic policies of the US and as a tireless advocate for racial and social justice. That justice, he declared, could be realized only if it were pursued according to a serious understanding of the Bible and the Christian faith. He was particularly active in the Civil Rights Movement and spoke extensively about civil disobedience through nonviolence and integration, particularly in an interview with Robert Penn Warren for the book Who Speaks for the Negro?.

As a Christian, he viewed his vocation as a commitment, bestowed upon him in baptism, to a lifelong struggle against the "powers and principalities", which he believed systemic evil is sometimes called in the New Testament, or "Power of Death". He proclaimed that being a faithful follower of Jesus means to declare oneself free from all spiritual forces of death and destruction and to submit oneself single-heartedly to the power of life. In contrast to most younger liberal Protestant theologians of his time, Stringfellow insisted on the primacy of the Bible for Christians as they undertook such precarious and inherently dangerous work. This placed him not within the camp of evangelicalism, but that of neo-orthodoxy, particularly the part of that school influenced by the Swiss Reformed theologian Karl Barth, who made a rare compliment to Stringfellow on his only visit to the US. Yet others might classify him as a harbinger of the later liberation theology during the 1970s and 1980s. Although, to be clear, Stringfellow himself was ultimately critical of any self-described political theology that would allow itself to function as a closed ideology. (Note: See, for example, the preface to Conscience & Obedience (1977): My esteem for the biblical witness and my approach to the Bible should be enough to disclose my skepticism about current efforts to construct political theology according to some ideological model. I refer, for one specific example, to attempts to articulate a pseudo-biblical rationale for classical Marxism, which have lately become prominent, oddly enough, simultaneously, in both some post-industrial societies of North America and Europe and in still pre-industrialized regions of Asia, Latin America, and Africa. ... [B]iblical politics never implies a particular, elaborated political theology, whether it be one echoing the status quo or one which aspires to overthrow and displace the status quo. The gospel is not ideology and, categorically, the gospel cannot be ideologized. Biblical politics always has a posture in tension and opposition to the prevalent system, and to any prospective or incipient status quo, and to the ideologies of either regime or revolution. Biblical politics are alienated from the politics of this age. In this sense, while Stringfellow may well side on the side of those resisting whatever type or level of oppression, he would further resist this resistance being turned into any sort of closed ideological system separable from the gospel message itself.) During his lifetime, similar ideas to Stringfellow's could be found in the writings of the French critic Jacques Ellul, with whom he had an ongoing correspondence.

He made pointed criticisms of theological seminaries: those of the liberal Protestant mainline were theologically shallow, their curriculum and ethos a mixture of "poetic recitations ... social analysis, gimmicks, solicitations, sentimentalities, and corn." On the other hand, he considered fundamentalist/orthodox institutions to isolate themselves from modern society; he commented, "... if they actually took the Bible seriously they would inevitably love the world more readily ... because the Word of God is free and active in the world." These conditions were, he felt, symptomatic of the twin errors of acculturated religious liberalism and authoritarian dogmatism, two options American Christians usually chose from in order to achieve the same goal: domesticating the Gospel and thus blunting its transformative impact on both individuals and the state. Instead of concerning himself with the US academic theological scene, Stringfellow sought an audience of law and business students, especially those who opted to embrace Christian beliefs and all the while fully involved themselves in the world.

A lawyer by profession, Stringfellow's chief legal interests pertained to constitutional law and due process. He dealt with both every day in Harlem as he represented victimized tenants, accused persons who would otherwise have inadequate counsel in the courts, and impoverished African Americans who were largely excluded from public services like hospitals and government offices.

Throughout his student days Stringfellow had involved himself in the World Student Christian Federation. He later became deeply immersed in the World Council of Churches, as well as his native denomination, the Episcopal Church (Anglican), where he supported the ordination of women. Stringfellow was also involved with the Sojourners Community in Washington, DC. He also harbored at his Block Island home the Jesuit priest Daniel Berrigan, who went underground after fleeing from federal authorities for acts of civil disobedience.

=== Influence ===
Stringfellow's foremost contribution to theological thought is to see in "images, ideologies, and institutions" the primary contemporary manifestations of the demonic powers and principalities often mentioned in the Bible. This outlook made him categorically suspicious of activities of governments, corporations, and other organizations, including the institutional churches, a viewpoint that placed him at odds with the nearly-ubiquitous "progressive" sentiments of the mid-20th century. In the mid-1960s, he defended Bishop James Pike against charges of heresy lodged against him by his fellow Episcopal bishops, believing them moved more by politics (i.e., appeasement of the denomination's conservatives such as Southerners and the wealthy) than serious faith.

Recent treatments of his body of work include those by theologian Walter Wink, Bill Wylie-Kellermann and Sharon Delgado, all ordained United Methodist ministers. He has also influenced later Roman Catholics, including John Dear and journalist Nathan Schneider, as well as evangelical social activists, Jim Wallis and Shane Claiborne, and biblical scholar, Wes Howard Brook.

=== Personal life ===
He had a longtime relationship with the Methodist poet Anthony Towne from the 1960s until Anthony died in 1980. He wrote A Simplicity of Faith: My Experience in Mourning (1982) afterwards, wherein he identified Anthony as "my sweet companion for seventeen years." He never publicly identified himself as a homosexual, but wrote and spoke on the topic, always denouncing the idolatry of both homophobia (as it is now called) in churches and the "ostentation" of gay culture, which he believed too often encouraged assuaging loneliness with lust and promiscuity. He died from diabetes on March 2, 1985. That ailment was a consequence of life-threatening surgery in 1968 which removed his pancreas, an episode recounted in detail in his book A Second Birthday.

== William Stringfellow Award ==
Since the 2000–2001 academic year, Bates College annually recognizes a student and a citizen in Maine for their work pursuing peace and justice. The Office of the Chaplain at Bates Colleges gives these awards to individuals who they find have "courageous and sustained commitment to redressing the systemic, root causes of violence and social injustice."

== Books ==
- The Life of Worship and the Legal Profession, New York; New York National Council, 1955 (available in reprint). ISBN 9780598471550
- A Public and Private Faith, Grand Rapids, MI: Eerdmans Publishing Co., 1962; Eugene, Ore. : Wipf and Stock Pub., 1999, ISBN 9781579102159
- Instead of Death, New York, NY: Seabury Press, 1963. Eugene, OR : Wipf & Stock, 2004. ISBN 9781592448739
- My People Is the Enemy, New York, NY: Holt, Rinehart and Winston, 1964; Eugene, OR : Wipf & Stock, 2005. ISBN 9781597523226
- Free in Obedience, New York, NY: Seabury Press, 1964; Eugene, Or. : Wipf & Stock Publishers, 2006. ISBN 9781597529525
- Dissenter in a Great Society, New York, NY: Holt, Rinehart and Winston, 1966. ISBN 9781597524193
- (with Anthony Towne) The Bishop Pike Affair, New York, NY: Harper & Row, 1967. ISBN 9781556353260
- Count It All Joy, Grand Rapids, MI: Eerdmans Publishing Co., 1967; Eugene, OR : Wipf and Stock, 1999. ISBN 9781579102913
- Imposters of God: Inquiries into Favorite Idols, Washington, DC: Witness Books, 1969.
- A Second Birthday, Garden City, NY: Doubleday, 1970.
- (with Anthony Towne) Suspect Tenderness: The Ethics of the Berrigan Witness, New York, NY: Holt, Rinehart and Winston, 1971.
- An Ethic for Christians and Other Aliens in a Strange Land, Waco, TX: Word, 1973. Eugene, Or. : Wipf & Stock, 2004. ISBN 9781592448746
- (with Anthony Towne) The Death and Life of Bishop Pike, Garden City, NY: Doubleday, 1976.
- Instead of Death, 2nd Edition, New York, NY: Seabury Press, 1976.
- Conscience and Obedience, Waco, TX: Word, 1977.
- A Simplicity of Faith: My Experience in Mourning, Nashville, TN: Abingdon, 1982.
- The Politics of Spirituality, Philadelphia, PA: Westminster Press, 1984.
- Foreword to Melvin E. Schoonover, Making All Things Human: A Church in East Harlem, New York; Holt, Rinehart & Winston, 1969.
