= Villers-aux-Tours =

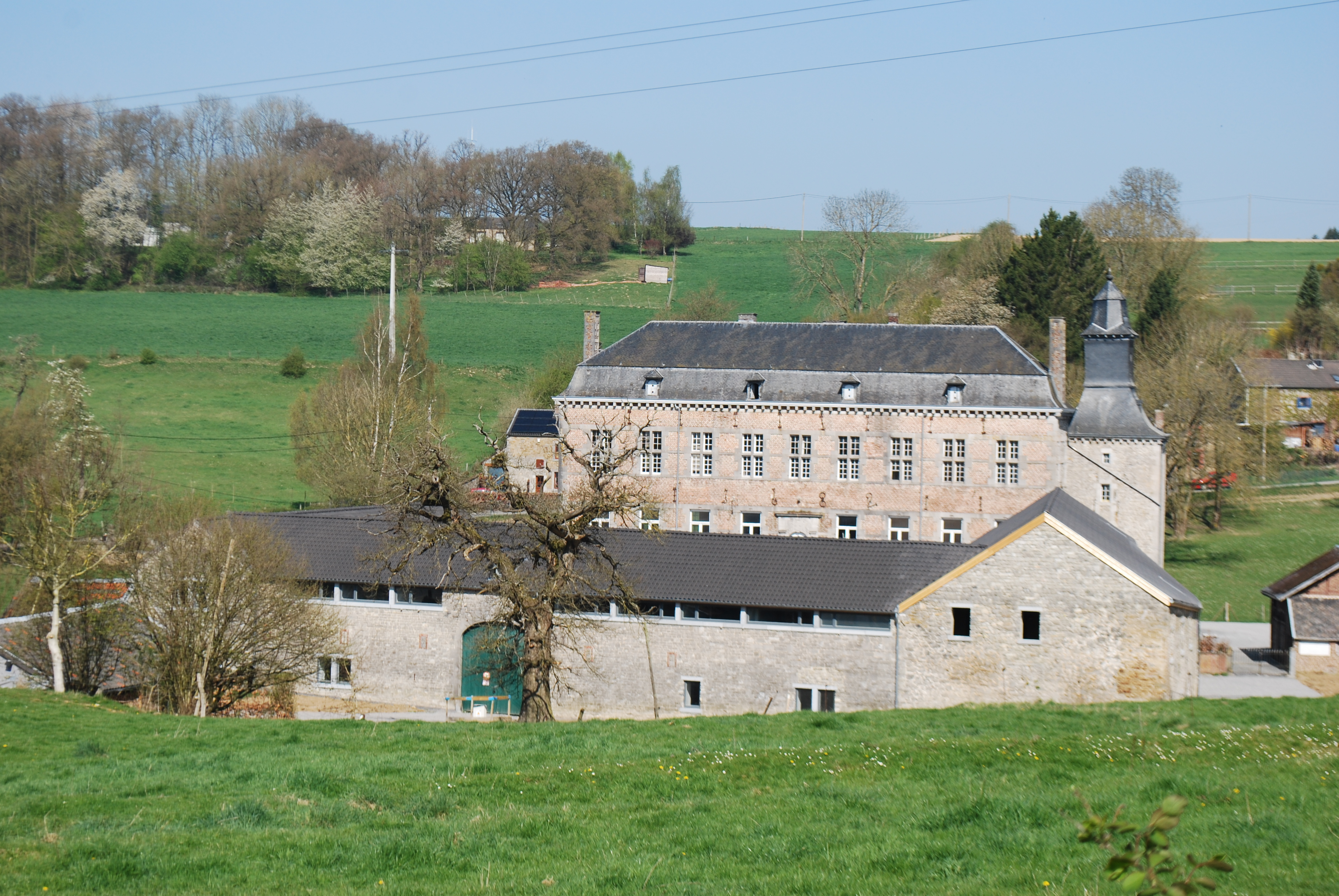
- Château de Villers-aux-Tours

- Location within Belgium Location within Europe
- Coordinates: 50°29′49″N 05°30′42″E
- Country: Belgium
- Region: Wallonia
- Province: Liège
- Municipality: Anthisnes

Villers-aux-Tours is a village in Wallonia and a district of the municipality of Anthisnes, located in the province of Liège, Belgium.

The village is mentioned in written sources for the first time at the end of the 13th century. The Château de Villers-aux-Tours was constructed at the end of the 17th century for the Rahier-Argenteau family, an inscription above the entrance gate bears the date 1688.
