= Hody, Wallonia =

Hody
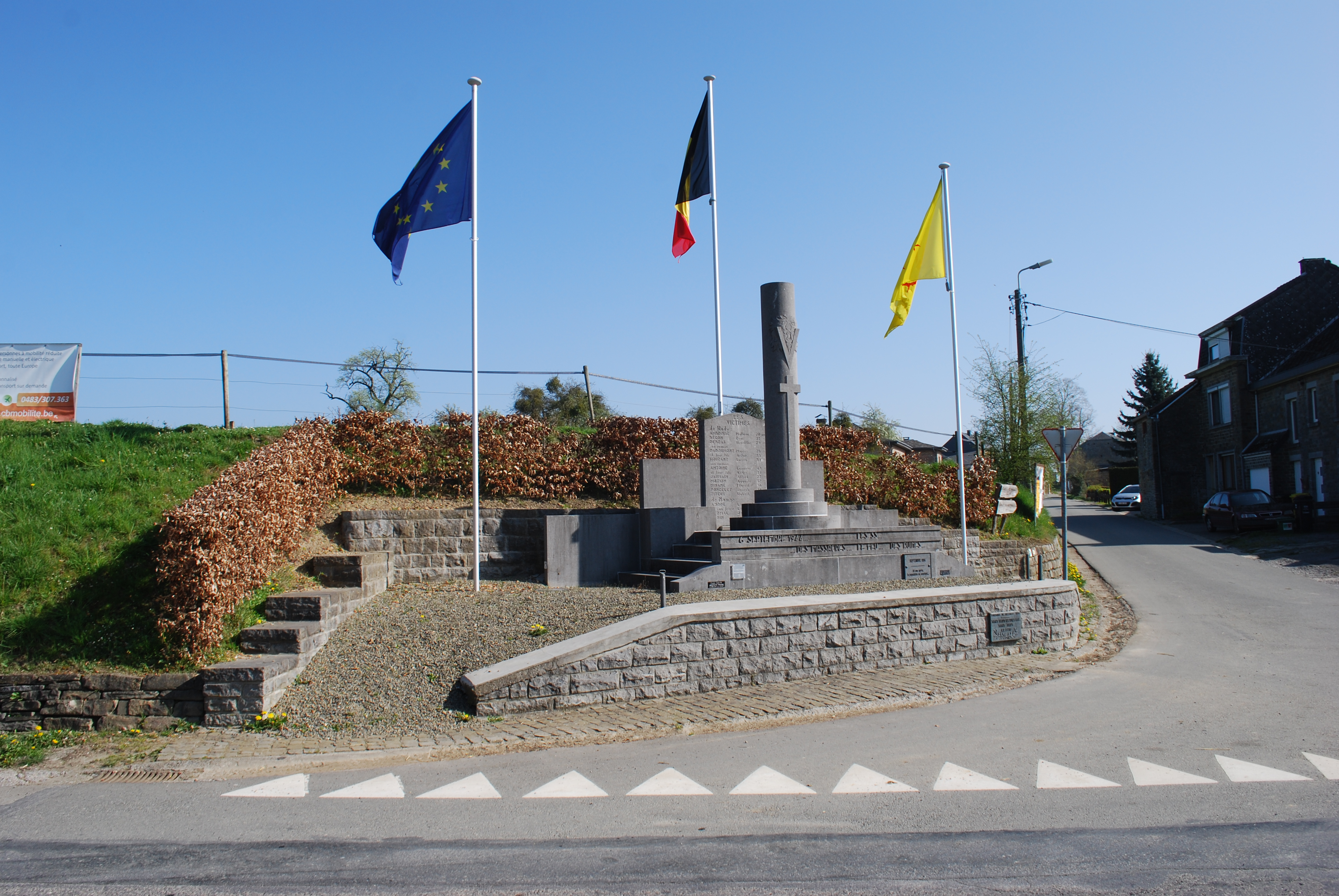
- Hody, war memorial in the centre

- Location within Belgium Location within Europe
- Coordinates: 50°29′15″N 05°30′05″E
- Country: Belgium
- Region: Wallonia
- Province: Liège
- Municipality: Anthisnes

Hody (French pronunciation: [ɔdi]) is a village in Wallonia and a district of the municipality of Anthisnes, located in the province of Liège, Belgium.

Archaeological findings indicate that there may have been a Roman villa at the site. The current village is mentioned in written sources for the first time in 1209. The village church is a listed historical monument and contains some of the most accomplished stucco decorations in Baroque style in Wallonia. It was restored in 1985. There is also a château in the village, mostly dating from 1910 but built around an older core, a building from the 17th century.
