= Tavier =

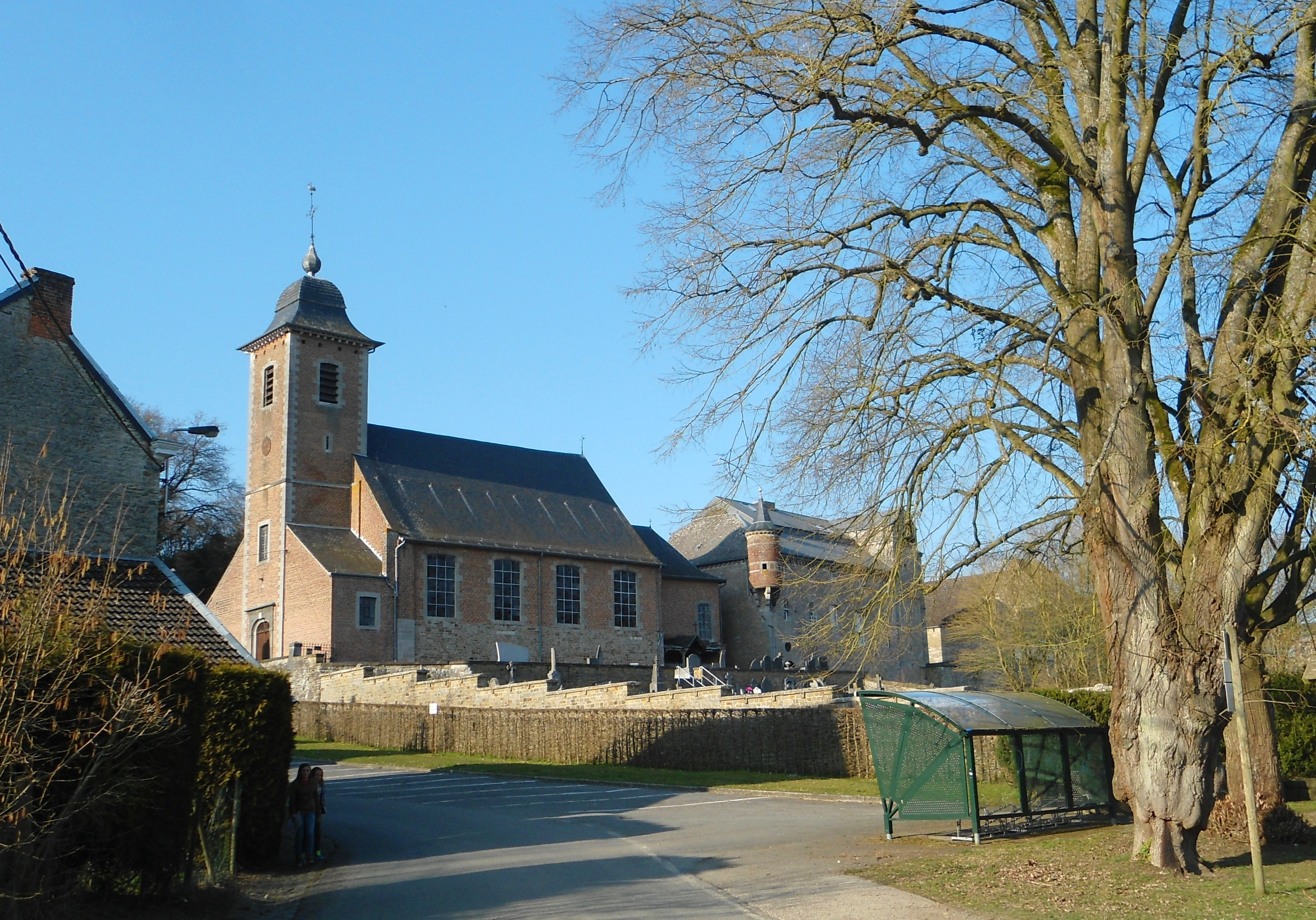
- Tavier, church (left) and fortified farmstead (right)

- Location within Belgium Location within Europe
- Coordinates: 50°29′49″N 05°28′15″E
- Country: Belgium
- Region: Wallonia
- Province: Liège
- Municipality: Anthisnes

Tavier (French pronunciation: [tavje]; Walloon: Taviere) is a village in Wallonia and a district of the municipality of Anthisnes, located in the province of Liège, Belgium.

The village name is given as Tauernas in the 12th century, deriving from the Latin word taberna, tavern. A lord of Tavier is mentioned for the first time in 1406. The village is centred around the village church and the fortified farmstead, dating from the 15th century. There are in addition several other historical farm buildings in the village, which in its entirety is a registered heritage site. The church is dedicated to Saint Martin of Tours and dates from 1765, when it was built to plans by Barthélemy Digneffe. It was enlarged in 1852.
