= Donald A. Stroh =

U.S. Army major general

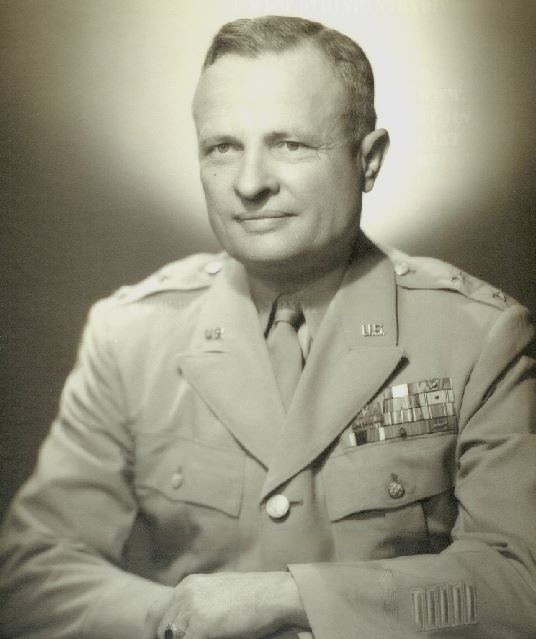
- Stroh as a major general, c. 1946
- Born: November 3, 1892; Harrisburg, Pennsylvania, U.S.
- Died: December 20, 1953 (aged 61); Washington, D.C., U.S.
- Burial place: Arlington National Cemetery
- Education: Michigan State University; United States Army Command and General Staff College; United States Army War College
- Spouse: Imogene Finger (m. 1917–1953)
- Children: 2
- Military career
- Service: United States Army
- Service years: 1917–1949
- Rank: Major General
- Service number: 05845
- Units: U.S. Cavalry Branch; U.S. Army Infantry Branch
- Commands: Troop H, 17th Cavalry Regiment; Howitzer Company, 35th Infantry Regiment; 2nd Battalion, 26th Infantry Regiment; 339th Infantry Regiment; 39th Infantry Regiment; 8th Infantry Division; 106th Infantry Division; Replacement Depot, Camp Pickett, Virginia; Army Personnel Records Board
- Wars: World War I World War II; Allied-occupied Germany
- Awards: Army Distinguished Service Medal; Legion of Merit (2); Bronze Star Medal

Donald A. Stroh (November 3, 1892 – December 20, 1953) was a career officer in the United States Army. A veteran of World War I and World War II, he served from 1917 to 1949 and attained the rank of major general. Stroh's commands included the: 339th Infantry Regiment; 8th Infantry Division; 106th Infantry Division; Replacement Depot, Camp Pickett, Virginia; and Army Personnel Records Board. Stroh's awards included the Army Distinguished Service Medal, two awards of the Legion of Merit, and the Bronze Star Medal.

A native of Harrisburg, Pennsylvania, Stroh was raised and educated in Washington, D.C. and graduated from Michigan State University in 1915. He began a civilian career in New York City and attended several citizens' training camps (Plattsburgh camps) conducted by the army in anticipation U.S. entry into World War I. In June 1917, his application for a commission was approved and he was appointed a second lieutenant in the United States Marine Corps. Stroh completed his initial training in August, when he effected a transfer to the army and was appointed a second lieutenant of Cavalry. After completing his initial training as a Cavalry officer, he was assigned to the 17th Cavalry Regiment at Camp Harry J. Jones, Arizona, which performed wartime security duty on the U.S.–Mexico border. After the war, Stroh served with the 17th Cavalry at Schofield Barracks, Hawaii. In 1920, he transferred to the Infantry Branch, and was assigned to the 35th Infantry Regiment.

After completing the course for Infantry officers in 1922, Stroh advanced through the ranks in command and staff positions, including postings to the Philippines. He completed the course at the United States Army Command and General Staff College in 1933 and the program of instruction at the United States Army War College in 1937. During World War II, he successively commanded the 339th Infantry Regiment, served as assistant division commander of the 9th Infantry Division, commanded the 8th Infantry Division, and commanded of the 106th Infantry Division. After the war, he commanded the Replacement Depot at Camp Pickett, Virginia, followed by the presidency of the Army Personnel Records Board. He retired in 1949.

In retirement, Stroh was a resident of Washington, D.C. and maintained a cottage on the Eastern Shore of Maryland. He died in Washington on December 20, 1953. He was buried at Arlington National Cemetery.

== Early life ==
Donald Armpriester Stroh was born in Harrisburg, Pennsylvania on November 3, 1892, the son of Harry Lincoln Stroh and Annie Armpriester Stroh. The family moved to Washington, D.C., in 1896, where Harry Stroh worked as a pressman at the Bureau of Engraving and Printing. Stroh attended the District of Columbia public schools and graduated from Central High School (now the Cardozo Education Campus) in 1911. While in high school, he participated in the school district's corps of cadets program, in which teams organized as military units competed in skills including drill and ceremony and marksmanship.

After his high school graduation, Stroh attended the Michigan Agricultural College (now Michigan State University), where he was a member of the corps of cadets for all four years. He graduated with a Bachelor of Science degree in agriculture in 1915 and began a civilian career in sales with the Sunkist Fruit Company in New York City. While working for Sunkist, Stroh continued his interest in military activities by taking part in several citizens' training camps (Plattsburgh camps), a program under the pre-World War I Preparedness Movement that offered participants the opportunity to apply for military commissions.

== Start of career ==
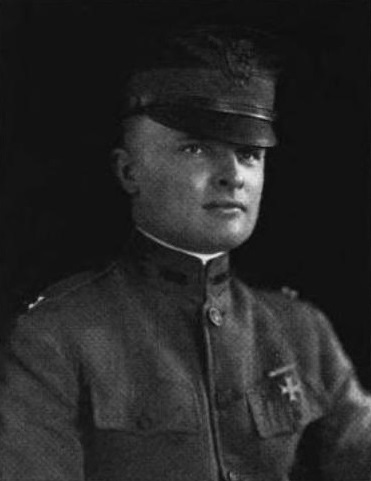
Stroh as a captain in 1926

With the United States entry into World War I, in 1917, Stroh competed successfully for a commission in the United States Marine Corps. He received his initial training at Marine Corps Recruit Depot Parris Island, South Carolina and Marine Corps Base Quantico, Virginia from June until August when he was able to effect a transfer to the Army. Assigned to the 3rd Provisional Battalion, Stroh completed the Army Service School at Fort Leavenworth, Kansas in October, then joined the 17th Cavalry Regiment at Camp Harry J. Jones in Douglas, Arizona as commander of the regiment's Troop H. The 17th Cavalry maintained border defense between the United States and Mexico for the duration of the war.

After the war, Stroh served with the 17th Cavalry at Schofield Barracks, Hawaii. In 1920, he transferred to the Infantry Branch and graduated from the Hawaiian Department's School of Arms, after which he remained at the school as an instructor, as well as the school's adjutant and quartermaster officer. He then joined the 35th Infantry Regiment at Schofield Barracks, where he was assigned to command the regiment's Howitzer Company. In September 1923, Stroh completed the course for officers at the Fort Benning, Georgia Infantry School. After graduation, he was assigned to the staff of 85th Infantry Division, an Organized Reserve Corps unit based in Michigan. He served with the 85th Division from June 1923 to May 1928, including postings as executive officer of the 339th Infantry Regiment, then as the division's adjutant and assistant chief of staff for personnel (G-1).

== Continued career ==
After graduating from the advanced course for Infantry officers Fort Benning in 1929, Stroh was assigned to the 16th Infantry Brigade at Fort Hunt, Virginia and posted as the brigade adjutant and operations and training officer (S-3). From 1931 to 1933, he attended the United States Army Command and General Staff College at Fort Leavenworth. He was then assigned to the 45th Infantry Regiment in the Philippines, where he commanded a company and served as a battalion executive officer. Stroh was promoted to major in November 1934 and assigned as executive officer of the 23rd Infantry Brigade.

In January 1936, Stroh was assigned to command 2nd Battalion, 26th Infantry Regiment at Plattsburgh Barracks. In June 1936 he began attendance at the United States Army War College. After graduating in June 1937, he was posted to the Fort Benning Infantry School as an instructor. In June 1940, was assigned to the Presidio of San Francisco, where he was appointed aide-de-camp to the commanding general of the Fourth United States Army and assistant chief of staff for Intelligence (G-2).

With U.S. entry into World War II imminent, in April 1941, Stroh was one of four officers selected to visit the United Kingdom to study the British military intelligence system. In the spring of 1942, Stroh returned to the 85th Division, which was being mobilized for wartime activation. Assigned to command the 339th Infantry Regiment at Camp Shelby, Mississippi, he led this unit during its initial organization and training and he remained in this position until July 1942. Stroh left regimental command upon promotion to brigadier general and assignment as assistant division commander of the 9th Infantry Division during its organization and training at Fort Bragg, North Carolina.

== Later career ==
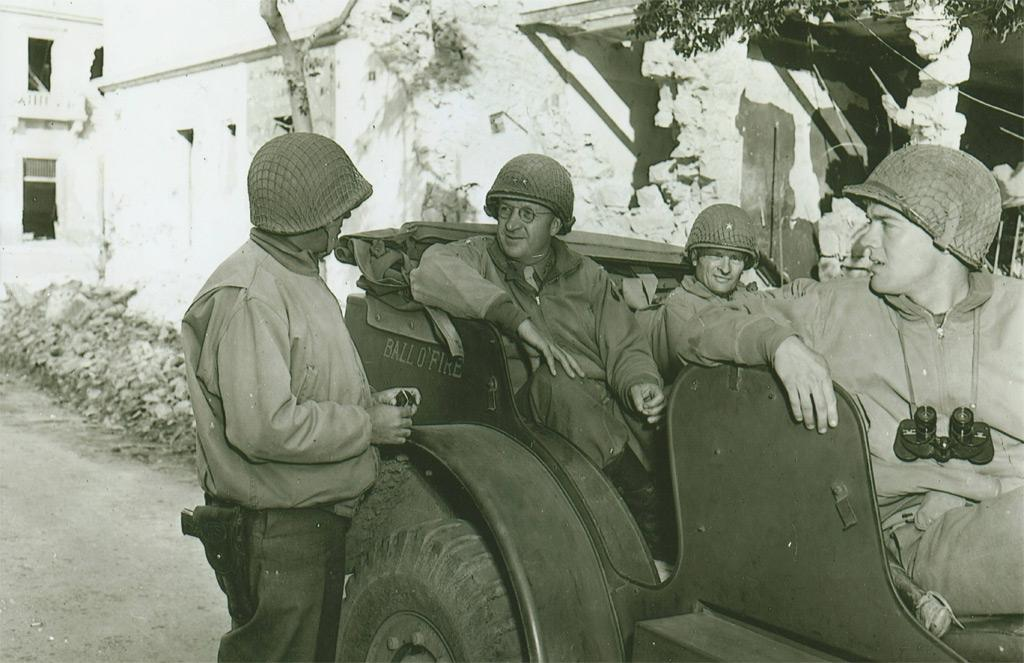
1943 photo of Stroh as assistant division commander of the 8th Infantry Division, seated behind driver. Seated next to Stroh is Major General Manton S. Eddy, the division commander.

The 9th Division took part in the invasion of North Africa in October 1942. In the Battle for Bizerte, Tunisia, Stroh took temporary command of the disorganized 39th Infantry Regiment and led its reorganization until a replacement commander was appointed. In July 1943, the 9th Division was part of the Allied invasion of Sicily, where Stroh was commended for his organizational and leadership skills in combat. In November 1943, the 9th Division sailed to England to prepare for the planned invasion of Northern France. The 9th Infantry Division landed at Utah Beach on June 10, 1944, and immediately went into battle. The division was credited with cutting the Cotentin Peninsula and played a key role in the battle for the port of Cherbourg.

On July 4, the 8th Infantry Division landed in France and joined the battle. After a week of fighting, it had made little headway and had taken heavy casualties, including several senior leaders. Stroh assumed command on July 13, oversaw the division's reorganization, then led it during action across Northern France. In August and September, the 8th Division was instrumental in the capture of the port of Brest and the clearing of the Crozon Peninsula. The division moved to Luxembourg in September and held a relatively quiet defensive sector until November. It then moved into the Hürtgen Forest where it relieved two divisions that had sustained heavy casualties, and captured the town of Hürtgen on November 28.

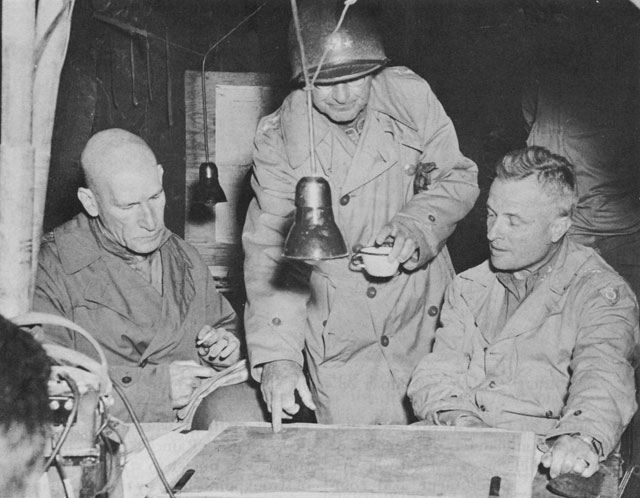
L to R: Ninth U.S. Army commander William Hood Simpson, VIII Corps commander Troy H. Middleton, and 8th Infantry Division commander Stroh confer in 1944

In the Battle of the Bulge in December 1944, the 106th Infantry Division had been overrun by the initial German onslaught and two of its three infantry regiments had been destroyed. Stroh assumed command on February 7, 1945, and assumed responsibility for rebuilding the unit and preparing it for combat. Throughout February and early March, the 106th Division fought on the right flank of First U.S. Army, which culminated when it breached the Siegfried Line. After refitting in France in April, the division returned to Germany, where it guarded prisoners and took part in occupation duties until it was inactivated in September 1945. During the post-war occupation, the 106th Infantry Division operated 16 prisoner of war camps and was responsible for over 900,000 prisoners.

Upon returning to the United States, Stroh was assigned to command of the Replacement Depot at Camp Pickett, Virginia. In April 1947, he was assigned to the Army Personnel Records Board. At the end of 1947, Stroh was medically retired but was immediately recalled to active duty as the board's president. In July 1949, the records board completed its work and Stroh permanently retired.

== Retirement and death ==
In retirement, Stroh resided in Washington, D.C. and also maintained a cottage on the Eastern Shore of Maryland which his wife and he called "Crozon" after the French location of an 8th Infantry Division attack during the Second World War. He was active in the American Legion and the Masonic order, and belonged to the Army and Navy Club. He was also a vice president of the Central High School Alumni Association.

Stroh died in Washington, D.C. on December 20, 1953. He was buried at Arlington National Cemetery.

== Awards ==
Stroh's U.S. awards included the Army Distinguished Service Medal, Legion of Merit with two oak leaf clusters, and Bronze Star Medal. His foreign awards included the French Legion of Honor (Officer) and Croix de Guerre with palm.

=== Army Distinguished Service Medal citation ===
For service as commanding general of the 8th Infantry Division from July to September, 1944. With tireless energy and keen foresight, he directed the operations of his division in the Normandy breakthrough and the campaign in Brittany culminating in the capitulation of the fortress of Brent.

Orders: War Department, General Orders No. 15 (1945)

== Effective dates of promotion ==
Stroh's effective dates of promotion were:

- Second Lieutenant, United States Marine Corps, 2 June 1917
- Second Lieutenant United States Army, 16 June 1917
- First Lieutenant, United States Army, 16 June 1917
- Captain, United States Army, 3 November 1917
- Major, United States Army, 1 November 1934
- Lieutenant Colonel, United States Army, 1 July 1940
- Colonel, Army of the United States, 24 December 1941
- Brigadier General, Army of the United States, 30 July 1942
- Major General, Army of the United States, 24 August 1944
- Colonel, United States Army, 25 April 1947
- Major General (retired), 30 November 1947
- Major General, Army of the United States, 1 December 1947
- Major General (retired), 30 June 1949

== Works by ==
(Partial list)

- "Operation on the Crozon Peninsula". Military Review. Fort Leavenworth, KS: United States Army Command and General Staff College. January 1946 – via Google Books.
- "Guarding Prisoners of War In Germany". Military Review. Fort Leavenworth, KS: United States Army Command and General Staff College. September 1946 – via Google Books.
- "Technique and Procedure Adopted by the 106th Division in Guarding Prisoners of War". Military Review. Fort Leavenworth, KS: United States Army Command and General Staff College. October 1946 – via Google Books.

== Family ==
In 1917, Stroh married Imogene Finger of Hickory, North Carolina. They were the parents of two children, daughter Imogene (1919–2014) and son Harry (1920–1944). Harry Stroh was an army captain when he was killed in action in 1944 while providing close air support for the 8th Division.

== Legacy ==
In 1950, Michigan State University awarded Stroh the honorary degree of LL.D. In 2021, Stroh's grandson Robert E. Stumpf authored a book, Letters to Imogene, which chronicles the World War II experiences of Stroh, Stroh's son Major Harry R. Stroh (Stumpf's uncle), and Stroh's son in law Colonel Robert H. Stumpf (Stumpf's father).

Military offices
Preceded by William C. McMahon	Commanding General 8th Infantry Division; July–December 1944	Succeeded by William G. Weaver
Preceded by Herbert T. Perrin	Commanding General 106th Infantry Division; 1944–1945	Succeeded by Post deactivated
