= List of protected heritage sites in Anthisnes =

This table shows an overview of the protected heritage sites in the Walloon town Anthisnes. This list is part of Belgium's national heritage.

| Object | Year/architect | Town/section | Address | Coordinates | Number^{?} | Image |
|---|---|---|---|---|---|---|
| Saint-Laurant abbey farm ^{(nl)} ^{(fr)} | | Anthisnes | avenue de l'Abbaye n°4 | 50.479970°N 5.525236°E | 61079-CLT-0001-01 Info | Abdij-boerderij Saint-Laurant |
| castle Avouerie ^{(nl)} ^{(fr)} | | Anthisnes | avenue de l'Abbaye 19 | 50.479754°N 5.523254°E | 61079-CLT-0003-01 Info | Kasteel van Avouerie More images |
| Old Brasserie near Castle Avouerie ^{(nl)} ^{(fr)} | | Anthisnes | | 50.479806°N 5.523585°E | 61079-CLT-0004-01 Info | |
| Elm tree ^{(nl)} ^{(fr)} | | Anthisnes | | 50.469493°N 5.495473°E | 61079-CLT-0005-01 Info | Linde: "tilleul des Floxhes" More images |
| Site of church St. Pierre and graveyard ^{(nl)} ^{(fr)} | | Anthisnes | | 50.487333°N 5.501225°E | 61079-CLT-0006-01 Info | |
| Church of St. Pierre ^{(nl)} ^{(fr)} | | Anthisnes | | 50.487296°N 5.501531°E | 61079-CLT-0007-01 Info | Kerk Saint-Pierre |
| Castle Vien ^{(nl)} ^{(fr)} | | Anthisnes | rue de l'Église, n°s 20-22 | 50.475413°N 5.495983°E | 61079-CLT-0008-01 Info | |
| Castle Vien park grounds ^{(nl)} ^{(fr)} | | Anthisnes | rue de l'Église, n°s 20-22 | 50.475878°N 5.490232°E | 61079-CLT-0009-01 Info | |
| Organs of St. Martin's church ^{(nl)} ^{(fr)} | | Anthisnes | | 50.496300°N 5.471090°E | 61079-CLT-0010-01 Info | |
| Valley of Tavier ^{(nl)} ^{(fr)} | | Anthisnes | | 50.489440°N 5.460929°E | 61079-CLT-0011-01 Info | |
| "d'Omalius" farmhouse ^{(nl)} ^{(fr)} | | Anthisnes | avenue de l'Abbaye 2 | 50.479392°N 5.525420°E | 61079-CLT-0012-01 Info | |
| Castle Villers-aux-Tours ^{(nl)} ^{(fr)} | | Anthisnes | Anthisnes | 50.501077°N 5.518150°E | 61079-CLT-0013-01 Info | |
| Saint-Maximin church frescoes ^{(nl)} ^{(fr)} | | Anthisnes | | 50.479755°N 5.525204°E | 61079-PEX-0001-01 Info | |
| 16th and 18th century frescoes in the church of St. Pierre ^{(nl)} ^{(fr)} | | Anthisnes | Hody | 50.487296°N 5.501531°E | 61079-PEX-0002-01 Info | |

== See also ==
- List of protected heritage sites in Liège (province)
- Anthisnes
