= 106th Infantry Division (United States) =

- Shoulder Sleeve Insignia
- Active: 15 May 1942 – 2 October 1945; 25 March 1948 – 12 October 1950
- Country: United States
- Allegiance: Army of the United States
- Branch: United States Army
- Type: Infantry
- Size: Division
- Garrison/HQ: Puerto Rico (1946–50)
- Nickname: Golden Lion
- Engagements: World War II; Rhineland; Ardennes-Alsace; Central Europe
- Battle honours: Distinguished Unit Citation: Ardennes-Alsace Campaign

Commanders
- Notable commanders: MG Alan W. Jones (March 1943); BG Herbert T. Perrin (December 1944); MG Donald A. Stroh (February 1945)

Insignia
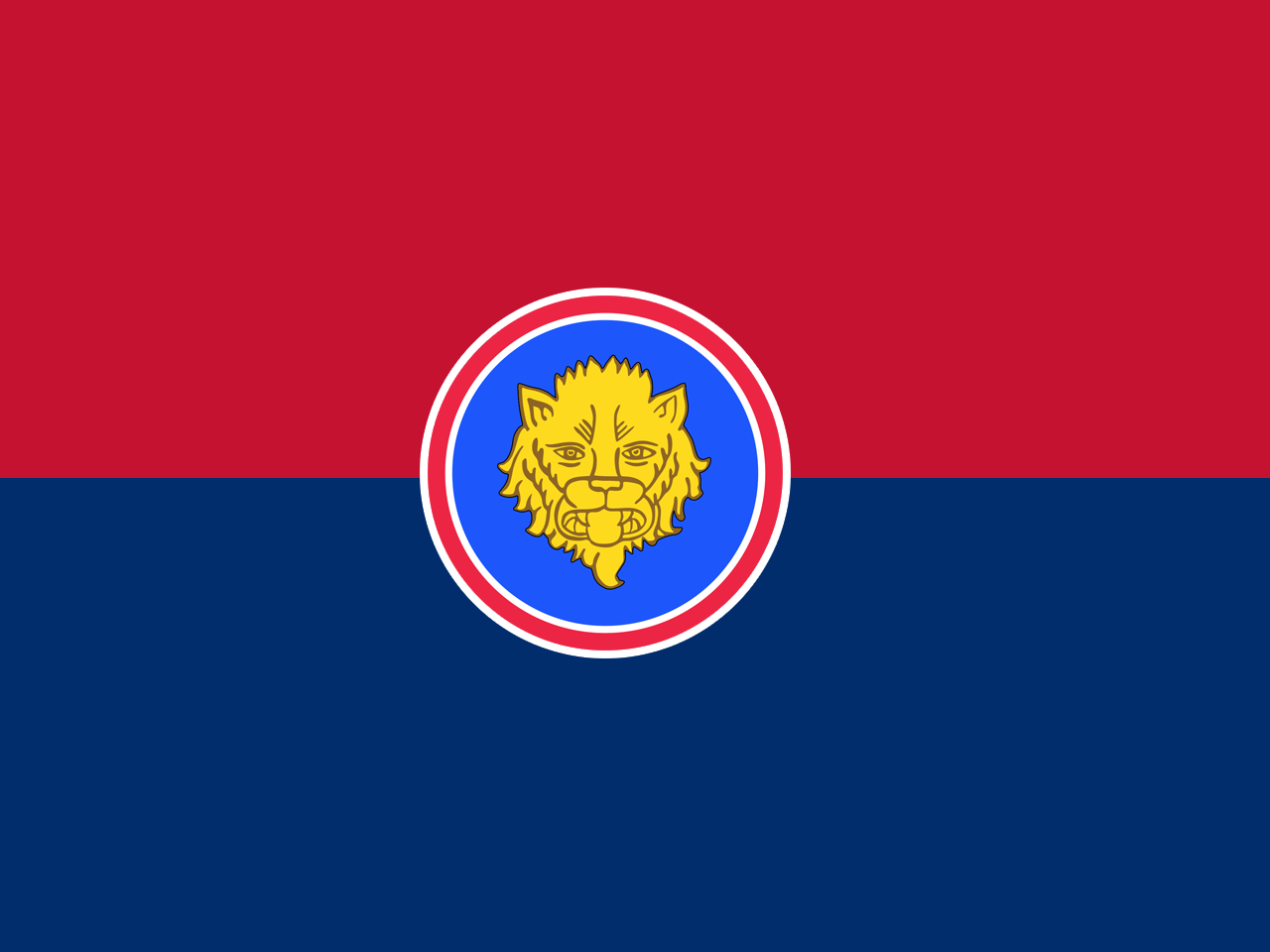
- Flag of the United States Army 106th Infantry Division

The 106th Infantry Division was a division of the United States Army formed for service during World War II. Two of its three regiments were overrun and surrounded in the initial days of the Battle of the Bulge, and they were forced to surrender to German forces on 19 December 1944. The division was never officially added to the troop list following the war, despite having been almost completely reorganized in Puerto Rico by 1948; subsequently, the War Department determined the division was not needed and inactivated the division headquarters in 1950.

== History ==
=== World War II ===
==== Division organization ====
The 106th Infantry Division's Headquarters and Headquarters Company was constituted in the Army of the United States on 5 May 1942, five months after the United States entered World War II. The division's numbering followed in sequence with the 105th Infantry Division, a planned African American infantry division that would be constituted on the Army's troop list, but never ended up being activated. The 106th Infantry Division was activated on 15 March 1943 at Fort Jackson in South Carolina, with a cadre from the 80th Infantry Division. The newly activated division consisted of the following units.

106th Infantry Division organization (click to enlarge)

- 106th Infantry Division
  - 106th Infantry Division Headquarters
  - 106th Cavalry Reconnaissance Troop (Mechanized) (M3 scout cars and then M8 Greyhound armored cars)
  - 422nd Infantry Regiment (destroyed on 19 December 1944; rebuilt in France and rejoined the division on 16 May 1945).
    - Headquarters and Headquarters Company
    - 3× Infantry battalions
      - each battalion consists of: 1× Headquarters and Headquarters Company, 3× Rifle companies, 1× Heavy Weapons Company
    - Cannon Company (T12 Gun Motor Carriages and T19 Howitzer Motor Carriages, later replaced by either M3 105mm towed howitzers or M7 Priest self propelled howitzers)
    - Anti-Tank Company (M3 37mm anti-tank guns, which were replaced by 1944 with M1 57mm anti-tank guns)
    - Service Company
  - 423rd Infantry Regiment (destroyed on 19 December 1944; rebuilt in France and rejoined the division on 16 May 1945).
    - same organization as 422nd Infantry Regiment
  - 424th Infantry Regiment
    - same organization as 422nd Infantry Regiment
  - 106th Infantry Division Artillery
    - Headquarters and Headquarters Battery
    - 589th Field Artillery Battalion
      - Headquarters and Headquarters Battery
      - 3× Batteries (M2 105mm towed howitzers)
      - Service Battery
    - 590th Field Artillery Battalion
      - same organization as 589th Field Artillery Battalion
    - 591st Field Artillery Battalion
      - same organization as 589th Field Artillery Battalion
    - 592nd Field Artillery Battalion
      - Headquarters and Headquarters Battery
      - 3× Batteries (M1 155mm towed howitzers)
      - Service Battery
  - Headquarters Special Troops
    - Headquarters Company, 106th Infantry Division
    - 106th Signal Company
    - 106th Quartermaster Company
    - 806th Ordnance Light Maintenance Company
    - Military Police Platoon
    - 106th Infantry Division Band (attached)
  - 81st Engineer Combat Battalion
    - Headquarters and Headquarters and Service Company
    - 3× Engineer combat companies
  - 331st Medical Battalion
    - Headquarters and Headquarters Detachment
    - 3× Collecting companies
    - Clearing Company

Following basic and advanced infantry training, the Division moved on 28 March 1944 to Tennessee to participate in the Second Army No. 5 Maneuvers. The 106th Infantry Division was one of twenty-two lower-priority divisions that saw extensive withdrawals of personnel during 1944 to comply with War Department rulings that all units not scheduled for early shipment could be used as sources of replacements (with the greatest possible proportion of men taken having six months or more of training), and that no eighteen-year-olds or men with children conceived prior to the Attack on Pearl Harbor, who had less than six months of training, be taken as replacements unless men were available from other sources. From April to September 1944, 5,050 infantry, field artillery, and cavalry privates and noncommissioned officers were withdrawn from the division. They were replaced chiefly by former Army Specialized Training Program students, aviation cadets-in-waiting transferred to the ground forces, men from disbanded anti-aircraft and tank destroyer units, and men who had volunteered for transfer to the infantry from other branches of the Army.

==== Combat chronicle ====
The 106th Infantry Division relieved the 2nd Infantry Division in the Schnee Eifel on 11 December 1944, with its 424th Infantry Regiment being sent to Winterspelt. Prior to the battle, according to the U.S. Army Service Manual, one division should be responsible for no more than 5 miles (8.0 km) of front. On the eve of the battle, the 106th, along with the attached 14th Cavalry Group, was covering a front of at least 21 miles (34 km).

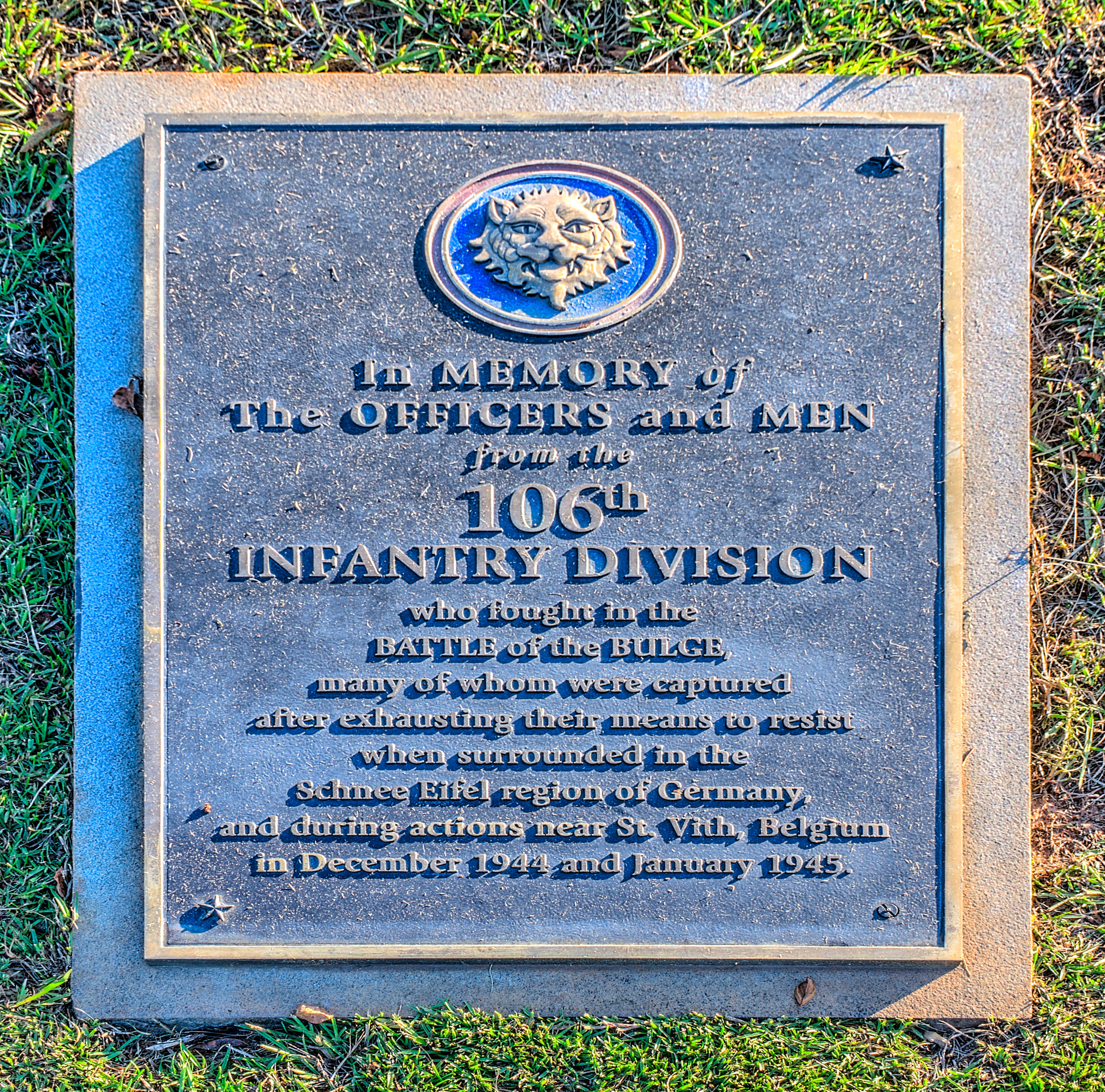
Memorial at Andersonville NHS

In the Ardennes Offensive, the Germans attacked the 106th on 16 December 1944. The division's 422nd and 423rd Infantry Regiments were encircled and cut off by a junction at Schönberg in the Belgian town of St. Vith. They regrouped for a counterattack, but were blocked by the enemy. The two regiments surrendered on 19 December. The Germans gained 6,000 prisoners in one of the largest mass surrenders in American military history.

The remainder of the division that evaded the German pincer movement was reinforced by the 112th Infantry Regiment of the 28th Infantry Division and withdrew over the Our River and joined other units at St. Vith. Along with the city of Bastogne to the south, St. Vith was a road and rail junction city considered vital to the German goal of breaking through Allied lines to split American and British forces and reach the Belgian port city of Antwerp. A scratch force of 106th Division personnel, in particular the division's 81st Engineer Combat Battalion, was organized and led by the 81st's 28-year-old commanding officer, Lt. Col. Thomas Riggs, in a five-day holding action (17–21 December) on a thin ridge line a mile outside St. Vith, against German forces vastly superior in numbers and armament. For this action, the 81st Engineer Combat Battalion was later awarded the Distinguished Unit Citation for gallantry.

The 81st and other units, including the 168th Engineer Combat Battalion, pulled back from St. Vith on 21 December, under constant enemy fire, and withdrew over the Salm River at Vielsalm on 23 December. The following day, the 424th Regiment, attached to the 7th Armored Division, fought a delaying action at Manhay until ordered to an assembly area. From 25 December to 9 January 1945, the division received reinforcements and supplies at Anthisnes, Belgium, and returned to the struggle, securing objectives along the Ennal-Logbierme line on 15 January after heavy fighting. After being pinched out by advancing divisions, the 106th assembled at Stavelot on 18 January for rehabilitation and training. It moved to the vicinity of Hunningen on 7 February for defensive patrols and training.

In March, the 424th advanced along the high ground between Berk and the Simmel River and was relieved on 7 March. A period of training and security patrols along the Rhine River followed, until 15 March, when the division moved to St. Quentin for rehabilitation and the reconstruction of lost units.

The division was reconstituted on 16 March when the 3rd Infantry Regiment (the Old Guard) and the 159th Infantry Regiment were attached to replace the two lost regiments. The division then moved back to Germany on 25 April, where, for the remainder of its stay in Europe, the 106th handled POW enclosures and engaged in occupational duties.

In the meantime, the 422nd Infantry Regiment and the 423rd Infantry Regiment were reconstituted from replacements in France on 15 April, were attached to the 66th Infantry Division in training status, and were still in this status when the Germans surrendered on 8 May 1945.

==== Attached units ====
During the division's time in Europe the following units were temporarily attached to the division:

- 3rd Infantry Regiment: 18 March 1945 – 16 May 1945
- 159th Infantry Regiment: 18 March 1945 – 16 May 1945
- 444th Anti Aircraft Artillery Battalion (Auto Weapons): 17-25 December 1944
- 563rd Anti Aircraft Artillery Battalion (Auto Weapons): 9-18 December 1944
- 634th Anti Aircraft Artillery Battalion (Auto Weapons): 8-18 December 1944
- 792th Anti Aircraft Artillery Battalion (Auto Weapons): 16 December 1944 - 25 January 1945
- 820th Tank Destroyer Battalion (Towed): 8 December 1944 – 4 January 1945

==== Casualties ====
- Total battle casualties: 8,627
- Killed in action: 417
- Wounded in action: 1,278
- Missing in action: 235
- Prisoner of war: 6,697

==== Campaign participation credit ====
- World War II:
  - Rhineland Campaign
  - Ardennes-Alsace Campaign
  - Central Europe Campaign

==== Decorations ====
Unit decorations:

- Distinguished Unit Citations
- Belgian Croix De Guerre (424th Infantry Cited per DA GO 44, 1949)
- Belgian Fourragère 1940 (424th Infantry cited per DA GO 45, 1950)
- Cited in the Order of the Day of the Belgian Army for action in the Ardennes (424th Infantry cited per DA GO 43, 1950).
- Cited in the Order of the Day of the Belgian Army for action at St Vith (424th Infantry cited per DA GO 43, 1950).

Individual decorations:

- 1 Medal of Honor
  - M/Sgt Roderick W. "Roddie" Edmonds (POW) (Posthumous) (See: Roddie Edmonds)
- 8 Distinguished Service Crosses
  - S/Sgt Walter L. Elrod
  - T/3 Marlyn J. Hall (POW)
  - BG Herbert T. Perrin (See: Herbert T. Perrin)
  - S/Sgt Richard A. Thomas (POW)
  - 1st Lt Robert H. Thompson
  - 2nd Lt Lewis W. Walker
  - T/5 Edward S. Withee (POW)
  - 1st Lt Eric F. Wood, Jr. (Posthumous)
- 1 Distinguished Service Medal
- 77 Silver Stars
- 9 Legions of Merit
- 26 Soldier's Medals
- 352 Bronze Stars
- 10 Air Medals

All infantry members who received the Combat Infantryman Badge were also later awarded the Bronze Star.

== Lineage ==
- Constituted on paper on 5 May 1942 in the Army of the United States.
- Activated on 15 March 1943 with a cadre from the 80th Infantry Division at Fort Jackson, South Carolina.
- Moved to Camp Atterbury, Indiana, on 28 March 1944.
- Staged at Camp Miles Standish, Massachusetts on 10 October 1944.
- Was sent back to New York Port of Embarkation and sailed to England
- Arrived in England, 17 November 1944, and trained for 19 days.
- Assigned 29 November 1944 to VIII Corps, First United States Army, 12th Army Group.
- 106th Infantry Division crossed into Belgium on 10 December 1944.
- Relieved from assignment to VIII Corps, and assigned on 20 December to XVIII Airborne Corps, First Army, 12th Army Group, with attachment to the 21st Army Group.
- Relieved from attachment to 21st Army Group on 18 January 1945, and returned to XVIII Airborne Corps, First Army, 12th Army Group.
- On 6 February, the 106th Infantry Division relieved from assignment to XVIII Airborne Corps, and assigned to V Corps.
- On 10 March, 106th Division relieved from assignment to V Corps, and assigned to Fifteenth United States Army, 12th Army Group.
- 106th Infantry Division returned to France on 16 March.
- On 15 April, 106th Infantry Division was attached to the Advanced Section, Communications Zone. Fifteenth Army directed the establishment of the Frontier Command segment of the Occupation of Germany.
- On 23 April, the Frontier Command segment of the German Occupation started.
- 106th Infantry Division entered Germany on 25 April.
- On 8 May 1945, Germany signed its surrender.
- 106th Infantry Division became responsible for guarding around 1,5 million German prisoners in so-called Rheinwiesenlager in very bad conditions. For this task, the 106th was reinforced to a strength of 40,000 men.
- 106th Infantry Division was located at Bad Ems, Germany on 14 August.
- 106th Infantry Division returned to New York Port of Embarkation on 1 October.
- Deactivated 2 October 1945 at Camp Shanks, New York.
- Headquarters Company allotted 25 March 1948 to the Organized Reserve Corps.
- Deactivated 1 May 1948 at San Juan, Puerto Rico.
- Deactivated 12 October 1950 at San Juan, Puerto Rico.

== Shoulder sleeve insignia ==
- Description. On a blue disc within a white edge, a gold lion's face all within a red border.
- Symbolism:

The blue is for infantry, while the red represents artillery support.

The lion's face represents strength and power.

== Notable members ==
Kurt Vonnegut served in this division and used his experiences during the Battle of the Bulge (and captivity as a prisoner of war) in his novel Slaughterhouse-Five.

Master Sergeant Roddie Edmonds (died 1985), who was captured on 19 December 1944 as a member of the 422nd Infantry Regiment, was recognized in 2015 by Israel's Yad Vashem Holocaust memorial and museum as the first American serviceman from World War II to be honored with the title Righteous Among The Nations for risking his life to save Jewish-American POWs under his command from being taken from the POW camp in Germany to concentration camps, where they likely would have been murdered or worked to death.

Donald Prell, futurologist and founder of Datamation, the first computer magazine, served as the leader of the second anti-tank platoon in the 422nd Infantry Regiment, and several years following the war researched the biological basis of personality with the British psychologist Hans Eysenck. Prell had been captured in the Battle of the Bulge, survived Allied aerial bombardment while locked in a boxcar with 59 other POWs, and then suffered freezing and starvation while in a German POW camp.

Richard B. Parker, a Foreign Service Officer, served as the leader of the first platoon of the Anti-Tank Company of the 422nd Infantry Regiment and was captured and served as a POW. Parker was an expert in Middle Eastern affairs and served as a U.S. Ambassador to Algeria, Lebanon and Morocco during the 1970s.

Ronald C. Brock commanded the 106th Division Artillery before moving to the 65th Infantry Division Artillery. He later served as Adjutant General of New York.

== Bibliography ==
- Wilson, John B. (1999). CMH Publication 60-7: Armies, corps, divisions, and separate brigades. Washington, D.C.: United States Army Center of Military History/US Government Printing Office. p. 742. ISBN 0-16-049994-1.
- MacDonald, Charles B. (1973). The last Offensive. United States Army in World War II Series. Washington, D.C.: United States Army Center of Military History/United States Government Printing Office.
- Cole, Hugh M. (1965). The Ardennes: Battle of the Bulge. United States Army in World War II Series. Washington, D.C.: United States Army Center of Military History/US Government Printing Office.
- Stanton, Shelby L. (1984). Order of Battle, US Army, World War II. Novato, California: Presidio Press. p. 596. ISBN 0-89141-195-X.
- Dupuy, R. Ernest (1949). St. Vith, Lion in the Way: The 106th Infantry Division in World War II. Washington, D.C.: Infantry Journal Press.
- Frank, Stanley B. (9 November 1946). The Glorious Collapse of the 106th. pp. 32–33.
- Kahn, E.J. Jr. & McLemore, H. (1945). Fighting Divisions. Washington, D.C.: Infantry journal.
- Kahn, E.J. Jr. & McLemore, H. (1980). Fighting Divisions (Reprint). Washington, D.C.: Zenger Publishing Company.
- Kline, John (1992). The Cub of the Golden Lion Passes in Review. Saint Paul, Minnesota: West Publishing Company.
- Perloff (1944). Harvey, S (ed.). 106th Infantry Division. Atlanta, Georgia: Albert Love Enterprises.
- Whiting, Charles (1980). Death of a Division. New York, New York: Stein and Day. ISBN 9780812827606.
- Whiting, Charles (1969). Decision at St. Vith. New York, New York: Ballantine Books.
