= Bill Wylie-Kellermann =

American Methodist pastor

Bill Wylie-Kellermann is an American Methodist pastor, nonviolent community activist, and author. He was most recently a pastor of St. Peter’s Episcopal Church in Detroit. As member of the Homrich 9, he and the others chose to get arrested by blocking trucks coming to shut off water to residents of Detroit living in poverty. While a crowd gathered, he and the others prayed and sang with interlinked arms in front of Homrich, a company that was performing the shutoffs. Normally the company performed hundreds of shutoffs a day, but that day they only turned off a few. When the case went to trial in 2016, all charges were dismissed by Ronald Giles, chief judge of Michigan's 36th district court. Wylie-Kellermann has also been the direct action point person during the Michigan Poor People's Campaign.

Wylie-Kellermann was a student of William Stringfellow, and has become an essential editor and interpreter of his work. He also knew Daniel Berrigan SJ well, and published an important book about him. A Detroit native, he long described himself as having a "place-based vocation," but post-retirement he divides his time between Michigan and Pennsylvania, where his daughter Lydia Wylie-Kellermann heads the historic Kirkridge Retreat and Study Center, long a hub of radical peace activism, and frequented by Dorothy Day, Elizabeth McAlister and Philip Berrigan, Daniel Berrigan, Molly Rush, Ardeth Platte, Carol Gilbert, and many others. He published a book about his late wife, Jeanie Wylie-Kellermann, who died in 2006. He married the Rev. Denise Griebler, a pastor in the UCC church, in 2013.

== Books ==
- Celebrant’s Flame: Daniel Berrigan in Memory and Reflection (Cascade Books, 2021)
- Principalities in Particular: A Practical Theology of the Powers That Be (Fortress, 2017)
- Seasons of Faith and Conscience: Kairos, Confession, Liturgy (Orbis Books, 1991)
- Where the Water Goes Around: Beloved Detroit (Cascade Books, 2017)
- William Stringfellow: Essential Writings (Orbis, 2014)
