= United States theaters of operations in World War II =

During World War II, the United States Army divided its operations around the world into four theaters. Forces from many Allied nations fought in these theaters. Other Allied countries have different conceptions of the theaters and/or different names for them.

== European Theater of Operations campaigns ==
=== US Army ===
The 16 officially recognized US Army campaigns in the European Theater of Operations are:

- North Africa campaigns:
  - Egypt-Libya: 11 June 1942 – 12 February 1943, American participation in the Western Desert campaign
  - Algeria-French Morocco: 8–11 November 1942, the allied landings in North Africa
  - Tunisia: 17 November 1942 – 13 May 1943, the Tunisian campaign
- Italy campaigns:
  - Sicily: 9 July – 17 August 1943, the allied invasion and liberation of Sicily
  - Naples-Foggia:
    - Air: 18 August 1943 – 21 January 1944
    - Ground: 9 September 1943 – 21 January 1944, from the Allied invasion of Italy to the Winter Line battles
  - Anzio: 22 January – 24 May 1944, the landing and battle at Anzio
  - Rome–Arno: 22 January – 9 September 1944, from the landing at Anzio to the arrival at the Gothic Line
  - Northern Apennines: 10 September 1944 – 4 April 1945, the Gothic Line battles
  - Po Valley: 5 April – 8 May 1945, the allied spring offensive 1945
- Western Europe campaigns:
  - Air Offensive Europe: 4 July 1942 – 5 June 1944, from the first American bombing mission over enemy-occupied territory in Europe to the night before D-Day
  - Normandy: 6 June – 24 July 1944, the allied landings in Normandy
  - Northern France: 25 July – 14 September 1944, from Operation Cobra to the beginning of Operation Market Garden
  - Southern France: 15 August – 14 September 1944, the allied landings in Southern France
  - Rhineland: 15 September 1944 – 21 March 1945, from Operation Market Garden to the start of the allied invasion of Germany
  - Ardennes-Alsace: 16 December 1944 – 25 January 1945, the Battle of the Bulge
  - Central Europe: 22 March – 11 May 1945, the allied invasion of Germany

=== US Navy ===
The nine officially recognized US Navy campaigns in the European Theater of Operations are:

- North African occupation: allied landings in North Africa
- Sicilian occupation: allied landings in Sicily
- Salerno landings: allied landings in Southern Italy
- West Coast of Italy operations (1944): allied landing at Anzio and subsequent supply of the Anzio beachhead
- Invasion of Normandy: allied landings in Normandy
- Northeast Greenland operation
- Invasion of Southern France: allied landings in Southern France
- Reinforcement of Malta: allied convoys to supply besieged Malta
- Escort, antisubmarine, armed guard and special operations

== Pacific Theater of Operations ==
Operational commands were the Pacific Ocean and South West Pacific.

=== US Army ===
The 16 officially recognized US Army campaigns in the Asiatic-Pacific Theater are:

- Pacific Ocean Areas:
  - Central Pacific: 7 December 1941 – 6 December 1943, allied landings on Tarawa and Makin during the Gilbert and Marshall Islands campaign
  - Air Offensive Japan: 17 April 1942 – 2 September 1945
  - Aleutian Islands: 3 June 1942 – 24 August 1943, the Aleutian Islands campaign
  - Northern Solomons: 22 February 1943 – 21 November 1944, part of the Solomon Islands campaign
  - Eastern Mandates: 31 January – 14 June 1944, allied landings on Kwajalein and Eniwetok during the Gilbert and Marshall Islands campaign
  - Western Pacific: 15 June 1944 – 2 September 1945, the Mariana and Palau Islands campaign
  - Ryukyus: 26 March – 2 July 1945, the allied landings on Okinawa
- South West Pacific Area:
  - Philippine Islands: 7 December 1941 – 10 May 1942, the Japanese conquest Philippines
  - East Indies: 1 January – 22 July 1942, Japanese conquest of the Dutch East Indies
  - Papua: 23 July 1942 – 23 January 1943, part of the New Guinea campaign
  - Guadalcanal: 7 August 1942 – 21 February 1943, the Guadalcanal campaign
  - New Guinea: 24 January 1943 – 31 December 1944, the New Guinea campaign
  - Bismarck Archipelago: 15 December 1943 – 27 November 1944
  - Leyte: 17 October 1944 – 1 July 1945, allied landings and liberation of Leyte
  - Luzon: 15 December 1944 – 4 July 1945, allied landings and liberation of Luzon
  - Southern Philippines: 27 February – 4 July 1945, allied liberation of the Southern Philippines during the Philippines campaign

=== US Navy campaigns ===
The 43 officially recognized US Navy Asiatic-Pacific campaigns are:

- Pearl Harbor: Pearl Harbor-Midway: 7 December 1941
- Wake Island: 8–23 December 1941
- Philippine Islands operation: 8 December 1941 – 6 May 1942
- Netherlands East Indies engagements: 23 January – 27 February 1942
- Pacific raids (1942): 1 February – 10 March 1942
- Coral Sea: 4–8 May 1942
- Midway: 3–6 June 1942
- Guadalcanal-Tulagi landings: 7–9 August 1942 (First Savo)
- Capture and defense of Guadalcanal: 10 August 1942 – 8 February 1943
- Makin Raid: 17–18 August 1942
- Eastern Solomons 23–25 August 1942
- Buin-Faisi-Tonolai raid: 5 October 1942
- Cape Esperance: 11–12 October 1942 (Second Savo)
- Santa Cruz Islands: 26 October 1942
- Guadalcanal: 12–15 November 1942 (Third Savo)
- Tassafaronga: 30 November – 1 December 1942 (Fourth Savo)
- Eastern New Guinea operation: 17 December 1942 – 24 July 1944
- Rennel Island: 29–30 January 1943
- Consolidation of Solomon Islands: 8 February 1943 – 15 March 1945
- Aleutians operation: 26 March – 2 June 1943
- New Georgia Group operation: 20 June – 16 October 1943
- Bismarck Archipelago operation: 25 June 1943 – 1 May 1944
- Pacific raids (1943): 31 August – 6 October 1943
- Treasury-Bougainville operation: 27 October – 15 December 1943
- Gilbert Islands operation: 13 November – 8 December 1943
- Marshall Islands operation: 26 November 1943 – 2 March 1944
- Asiatic-Pacific raids (1944): 16 February – 9 October 1944
- Western New Guinea operations: 21 April 1944 – 9 January 1945
- Marianas operation: 10 June – 27 August 1944
- Western Caroline Islands operation: 31 August – 14 October 1944
- Leyte operation: 10 October – 29 November 1944
- Luzon operation: 12 December 1944 – 1 April 1945
- Iwo Jima operation 15 February – 16 March 1945
- Okinawa Gunto operation: 17 March – 30 June 1945
- Third Fleet operations against Japan: 10 July – 15 August 1945
- Kurile Islands operation: 1 February 1944 – 11 August 1945
- Borneo operations: 27 April – 20 July 1945
- Tinian capture and occupation: 24 July – 1 August 1944
- Consolidation of the Southern Philippines: 28 February – 20 July 1945
- Hollandia operation: 21 April – 1 June 1944
- Manila Bay-Bicol operations: 29 January – 16 April 1945
- Escort, antisubmarine, armed guard and special operations: 7 December 1941 – 2 September 1945
- Submarine War Patrols (Pacific): 7 December 1941 – 2 September 1945

== China Burma India Theater ==
The China Burma India Theater was a U.S. designation not shared by the British, who were before 1939 the major military power in the area. The British dominated operations in India and Burma, apart from strategic bombing operations by the USAAF which began slowly. South East Asia Command (SEAC) was headed by Admiral Lord Louis Mountbatten, though with significant US participation. The American General Joseph Stilwell commanded the Northern Combat Area Command in China and used his other positions to communicate directly with Joint Chiefs of Staff about operational matters.

The officially recognized US Army campaigns in the China Burma India Theater are:

- Burma campaigns:
  - Burma 1942: 7 December 1941 – 26 May 1942, allied defensive operations during the Japanese conquest of Burma
  - India-Burma: 2 April 1942 – 28 January 1945, allied operations in Burma 1942–43 and Burma and India 1944
  - Central Burma: 29 January – 15 July 1945, the allied Burma offensive in 1945
- China campaigns:
  - China Defensive: 4 July 1942 – 4 May 1945
  - China Offensive: 5 May – 2 September 1945
