= Herbert T. Perrin =

United States Army general

Herbert Towle Perrin
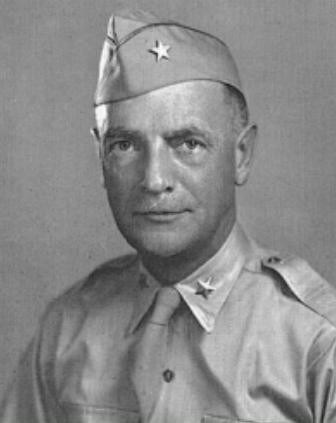
- Born: September 8, 1893; Platteville, Wisconsin, US
- Died: June 9, 1962 (aged 68); Mount Vernon, Ohio, US
- Burial place: Arlington National Cemetery
- Military career
- Allegiance: United States
- Branch: United States Army
- Service years: 1917–1946
- Rank: Brigadier General
- Unit: Infantry Branch
- Commands: 106th Infantry Division
- Conflicts: World War I World War II: Rhineland Campaign; Ardennes-Alsace Campaign; Central Europe Campaign
- Awards: Distinguished Service Cross; Legion of Merit

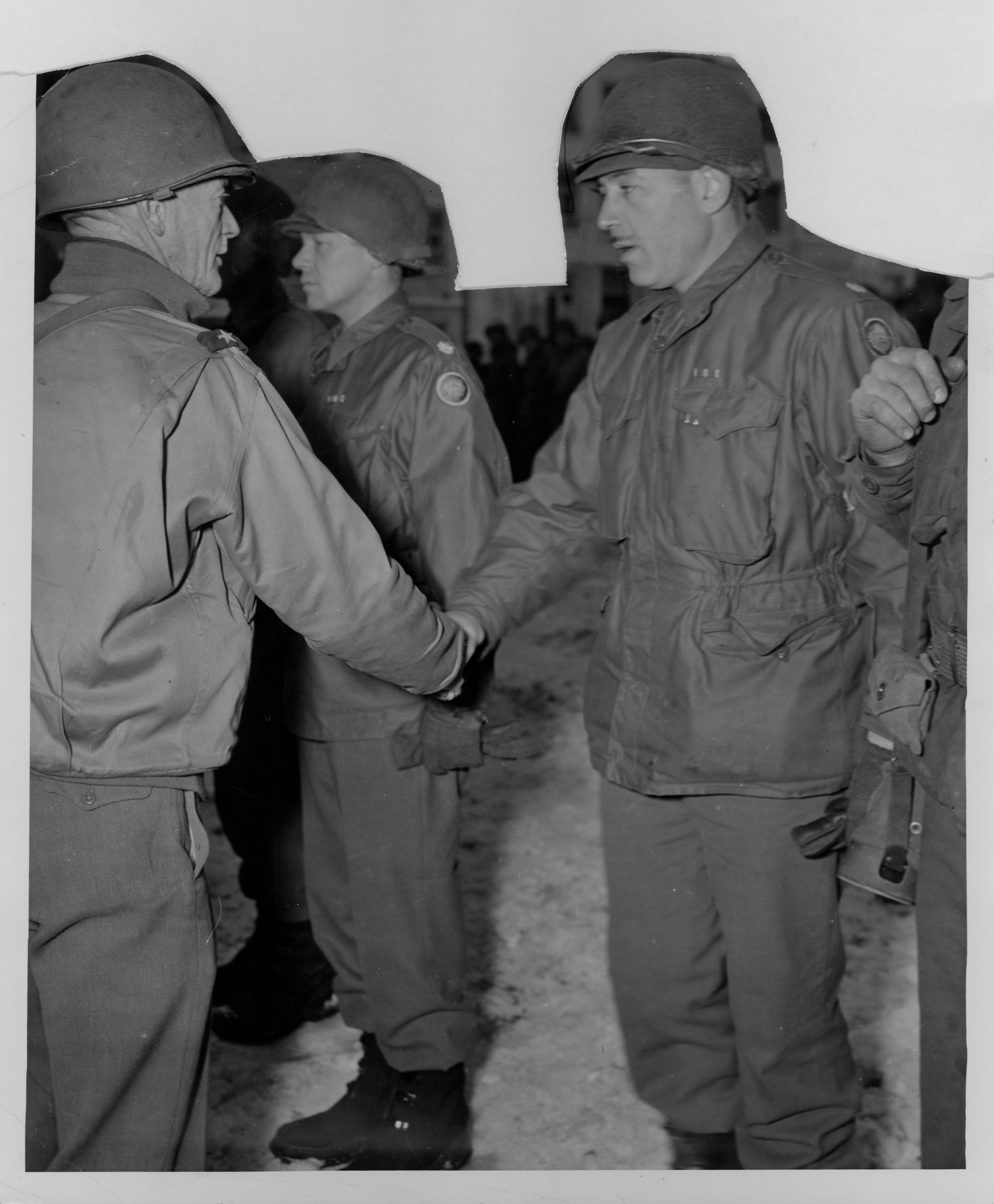
Perrin (left) congratulates a soldier following a presentation of the Bronze Star Medal

Brigadier General Herbert Towle Perrin (September 8, 1893 – June 9, 1962) was a United States Army officer, with the rank of brigadier general. He served during World War II and received the second highest military award, the Distinguished Service Cross, for his leadership as the acting commander of the 106th Infantry Division.

== Biography ==
Perrin was born on September 8, 1893, in the city of Platteville, Wisconsin. He graduated from Kenyon College in 1916 and was a member of Delta Kappa Epsilon. Subsequently, he graduated from Princeton University in 1917. Perrin joined the Army in 1917 and had risen to the rank of captain by 1920.

After service at various infantry posts, he attended the United States Army Command and General Staff College at Fort Leavenworth, Kansas in 1933. Subsequently, Perrin served in the Adjutant General's Office from 1934 to 1938. In this capacity he was promoted to the rank of major on May 1, 1937.

In 1942 and 1943, Perrin served as chief of staff in the 76th Infantry Division under command of Major General William R. Schmidt.

In 1943, Perrin was promoted to brigadier general and was assigned to the 106th Infantry Division as the assistant division commander. Perrin participated with the division in the Rhineland Campaign, Ardennes-Alsace Campaign and Central Europe Campaign. During the Battle of the Bulge, his division commander, Major General Alan W. Jones suffered a heart attack and Perrin assumed command of the division.

Perrin stayed in command until February 1945 and was awarded the Distinguished Service Cross for his leadership of the division. He was succeeded by Major General Donald A. Stroh, and he returned to his position of assistant division commander and served in this command until 1946, when he was retired.

Perrin died at Mercy Hospital in Mount Vernon, Ohio at the age of 68 years after suffering a stroke at his home in Gambier, and was buried at Arlington National Cemetery alongside his wife, Anne Wilby Perrin (1884–1960).

== Effective dates of promotion ==
Perrin's effective dates of promotion were:

- Second Lieutenant, October 26, 1917
- First Lieutenant, October 26, 1917
- Captain, June 22, 1917
- Major, May 1, 1937
- Lieutenant Colonel, October 26, 1940
- Colonel (temporary), February 1, 1942
- Brigadier General (temporary), March 18, 1943
- Brigadier General (retired), September 30, 1946

== Decorations ==
Distinguished Service Cross
Legion of Merit
World War I Victory Medal
American Defense Service Medal
American Campaign Medal
European-African-Middle Eastern Campaign Medal with 3 Service Stars
World War II Victory Medal
Army of Occupation Medal
Officer of the Legion of Honor (France)
Croix de Guerre 1939–1945 with Palm (France)
