= Anthisnes =

Municipality in Liège Province, Wallonia, Belgium

Anthisnes Antene (Walloon)
- Municipality
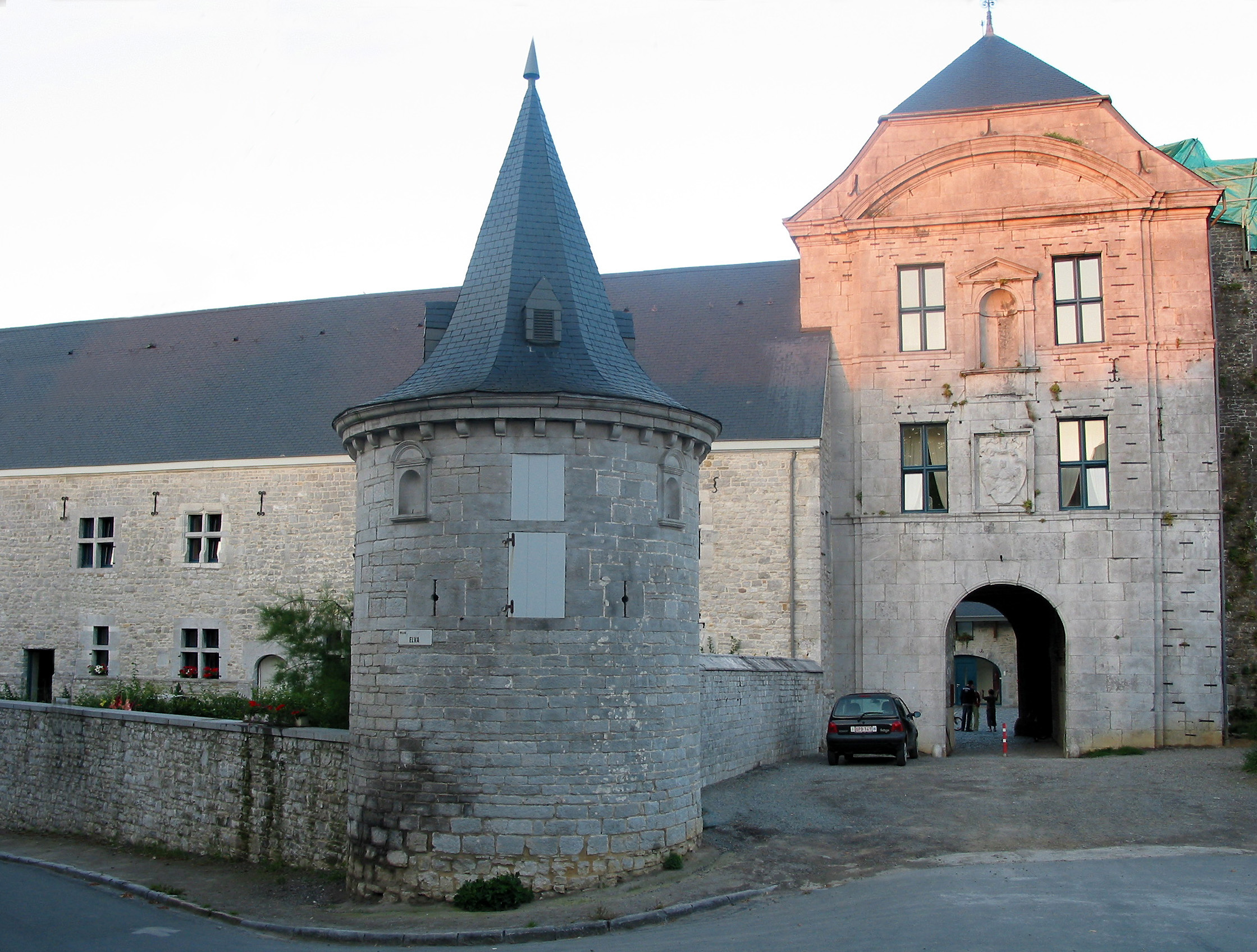

- Flag Coat of arms

- Location of Anthisnes in the province of Liège
- Interactive map of Anthisnes
- Location in Belgium
- Coordinates: 50°29′N 05°31′E
- Country: Belgium
- Community: French Community
- Region: Wallonia
- Province: Liège
- Arrondissement: Huy

Government
  - Mayor: Marc Tarabella (PS)
  - Governing party: PS-IC

Area
  - Total: 37.32 km^{2} (14.41 sq mi)

Population (2018-01-01)
  - Total: 4,204
  - Density: 112.6/km^{2} (291.8/sq mi)
- Postal codes: 4160-4163
- NIS code: 61079
- Area codes: 04
- Website: www.anthisnes.be

Anthisnes (French pronunciation: [ɑ̃tin]; Walloon: Antene) is a municipality of Wallonia located in the province of Liège, Belgium.

On 1 January 2006 Anthisnes had a total population of 3,998. The total area is 37.08 km^{2} which gives a population density of 108 inhabitants per km^{2}.

The municipality consists of the following districts: Anthisnes, Hody, Tavier, and Villers-aux-Tours.

== Famous inhabitants ==
- Marc Tarabella, mayor, member of the European Parliament.

== See also ==
- List of protected heritage sites in Anthisnes
