= Alan W. Jones =

United States Army general (1894–1969)

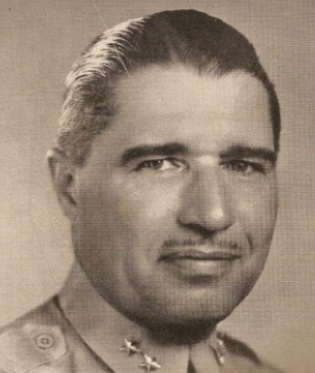
- Alan W. Jones, pictured here as a major general commanding the 106th Infantry Division in 1944. Center of Military History, United States Army.
- Born: 6 October 1894; Goldendale, Washington, United States
- Died: 22 January 1969 (aged 74); Washington D.C., United States
- Burial place: Arlington National Cemetery, Virginia, United States
- Spouse: Alys O. Pickering (m. 1917–1969, his death)
- Children: 2
- Military career
- Allegiance: United States
- Branch: United States Army
- Service years: 1917−1945
- Rank: Major General
- Unit: Infantry Branch
- Commands: 106th Infantry Division
- Conflicts: World War I World War II
- Awards: Purple Heart; Legion of Honour (France); Croix de Guerre (France)

Major General Alan Walter Jones (October 6, 1894 − January 22, 1969) was a career officer in the United States Army. He is best known for his command of the 106th Infantry Division during World War II.

== Early life ==
Alan Walter Jones Sr. was born in Goldendale, Washington on October 6, 1894, a son of Jessie M. Jones and Milton S Jones. He was raised in Walla Walla, Washington, and attended Whitman College and the University of Washington. Jones was working as a laborer for the Union Pacific Railroad in Seattle in 1917 when he applied for a commission in the United States Army.

Jones' application was approved in October 1917, six months after the American entry into World War I, and he was commissioned a second lieutenant of Infantry and assigned to the 43rd Infantry Regiment. After completing his in processing at Fort Leavenworth, Kansas, Jones joined his regiment at Fort Douglas, Utah. During World War I, Jones was promoted to first lieutenant and then temporary captain, and served at posts including Camp Pike, Arkansas and Pensacola, Florida. After the war, Jones reverted to his permanent rank of first lieutenant and continued his army career.

== Military education ==
Jones was a 1925 graduate of the Infantry Officer Course. In 1930 he completed the Infantry Officer Advanced Course. He was then selected for attendance at the Field Artillery Officer Advanced Course, from which he graduated in 1931. Jones graduated from the United States Army Command and General Staff College in 1936. Chosen for further professional education at the United States Army War College, Jones began attending in 1937 and graduated in 1938.

== Post-World War I ==
In 1920, Jones was promoted to permanent captain. He continued to serve in Infantry assignments, including an early 1920s posting to the Philippines with the 45th Infantry Regiment. In the late 1920s, Jones served on the staff of the Army Infantry School at Fort Benning, Georgia and in 1929 he was assigned to Camp Perry, Ohio as a faculty member for a newly organized program of marksmanship instruction which preceded an annual military shooting competition.

In the early 1930s, Jones served with the 12th Infantry Regiment at Fort Washington, Maryland, followed by an assignment to the staff of the Army's Chief of Infantry. He was promoted to major in 1934, and served with the 7th Infantry Regiment at Vancouver Barracks, Washington. In 1938, Jones was posted to the 19th Infantry Regiment at Schofield Barracks, Hawaii, and he was promoted to lieutenant colonel on July 1, 1940, while the United States was preparing for World War II.

== World War II ==
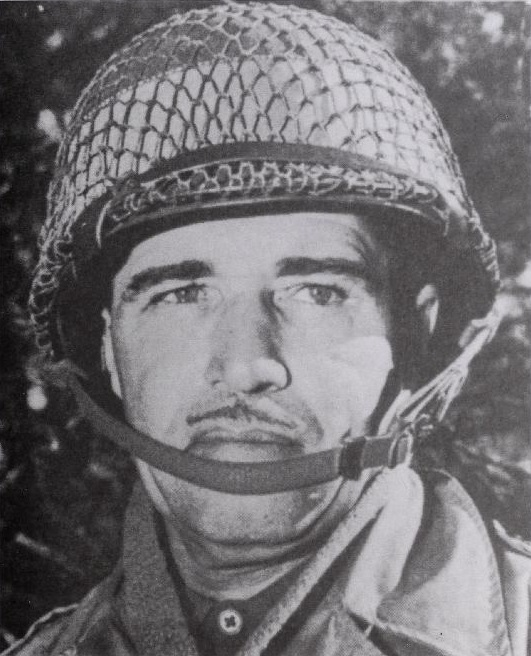
Alan W. Jones while serving as commander of the 106th Infantry Division. From Generals of the Ardennes: American Leadership in the Battle of the Bulge.

Jones was ordered to the Army staff at the War Department in 1941, and was assigned to the office of the deputy chief of staff for operations and training, G-3. On December 24, 1941, shortly after the Japanese attack on Pearl Harbor and the subsequent German declaration of war against the United States, he was promoted to the temporary rank of colonel. Jones was assigned to the staff of the Army Ground Forces headquarters in April 1942, and on June 24 he received promotion to the temporary rank of brigadier general. After becoming a general officer, Jones took over from Charles W. Ryder as assistant division commander (ADC) of the 90th Infantry Division, commanded by Major General Henry Terrell Jr. Jones served in this position until January 1943.

=== 106th Infantry Division ===
In January 1943, Jones was assigned to command the 106th Infantry Division during its organization and training at Fort Jackson, South Carolina. He was promoted to temporary major general on March 16. The 106th Division trained at Fort Jackson and participated in the Second Army's 1943 and 1944 Tennessee Maneuvers. In March 1944, the 106th Infantry Division moved to Camp Atterbury, Indiana, where many of its soldiers received new assignments as replacements for soldiers killed and wounded in combat and postings to units of the Army Service Forces. Newly assigned soldiers were not as experienced and trained as their predecessors. In October 1944, the division moved to Massachusetts, where it embarked for transport to Europe. The division arrived in Belgium in early December and was immediately transferred to the front lines near St. Vith and the Ardennes forest, where it relieved the 2nd Infantry Division on December 12.

Four days after the 106th Infantry Division took its place on the front lines, the German army began the offensive that became known as the Battle of the Bulge. Jones' inexperienced division initially performed well, but quickly became combat ineffective, with two of its three regiments, the 422nd and 423rd Infantry, encircled and cut off near Schönberg in Eupen-Malmedy, which ultimately resulted in their surrender to the Germans.

During the fighting, Jones was agitated and apprehensive over the impending loss of the two regiments, one of which included his son, who was a captain in the 423rd Infantry. At one point he sardonically observed that he had set a record for "losing a division quicker than any commander in the US Army." Major General Matthew Ridgway, Jones's superior officer as commander of XVIII Airborne Corps, grew frustrated with the situation and ordered Jones to be relieved of command, intending to give Brigadier General Bruce C. Clarke effective command in St. Vith. However Jones suffered a heart attack later that evening and was medically evacuated on December 22, which turned command over to his deputy, Brigadier General Herbert T. Perrin. As a face-saving measure, Jones was then assigned as deputy to Ridgway. In March 1945, Jones was taking part in offensive operations between Bonn and Cologne when a German bomb landed near him and he sustained head wounds that required him to be hospitalized. Jones remained on active duty as a major general until he retired for medical reasons in October 1945.

== Post-World War II ==
After retiring, Jones lived in Washington, DC. He was active in the 106th Infantry Division's veterans association and was a member of the Army and Navy Club and the Corinthian Yacht Club.

== Death and burial ==
Jones was diagnosed with cancer in 1968. His condition steadily worsened and in December he was moved to Walter Reed Hospital for treatment. He died there on January 22, 1969. His funeral took place at the Fort Myer, Virginia post chapel on January 27 and was attended by several 106th Infantry Division veterans, including his former division artillery commander. Jones was buried at Arlington National Cemetery.

== Awards ==
Jones was a recipient of the Purple Heart for his World War II service. In addition, he received the Legion of Honor and the Croix de Guerre from France.

== Family ==
In 1917, Jones married Alys O. Pickering (1899–1998) of Prescott, Washington. They were the parents of two children, Colonel Alan W. Jones Jr. (1921–2014), a career Army officer and Hallie (1924–2008), the wife of U.S. Marine Corps Colonel Ewald A. Vom Orde.

== Sources ==
=== Books ===
- Morelock, J. D. (1994). Generals of the Ardennes: American Leadership in the Battle of the Bulge. Washington, DC: National Defense University Press. ISBN 978-0-16-042069-6 – via Internet Archive.
- U.S. Army Adjutant General (1948). Official Army and Air Force Register. Vol. II. Washington, DC: US Government Printing Office – via HathiTrust.

=== Internet ===
- Center of Military History. "Order of Battle, 106th Infantry Division". Order of Battle of the US Army - WWII - ETO. Washington, DC: U.S. Army. Archived from the original on January 9, 2008.
- U.S. Department of War (June 5, 1917). "U.S. World War I Draft Registration Cards, 1917-1918, Entry for Alan Walter Jones". Ancestry.com. Lehi, UT: Ancestry.com LLC.
- Spokane County (WA) Auditor (June 9, 1917). "Washington state Marriage Records 1854-2013, Entry for Alan Walter Jones and Alys O. Pickering". Ancestry.com. Lehi, UT: Ancestry.com LLC.

=== Magazines ===
- Fritz, John R. (October 1, 1969). "Major General Alan W. Jones, Ret., Our Division Commander, Passes Away". The Cub. Elyria, OH: 106th Infantry Division Veterans Association.

=== Newspapers ===
- "4 Lieutenants are Assigned to 43rd". Salt Lake Telegram. Salt Lake City, UT. July 23, 1917 – via Newspapers.com.
- "Alan W. Jones is Promoted". The Spokesman-Review. Spokane, WA. August 28, 1918 – via Newspapers.com.
- "Jefferson Barracks: Capt. and Mrs. Alan W. Jones". St. Louis Post-Dispatch. St. Louis, MO. June 10, 1928 – via Newspapers.com.
- "Camp Perry Rifle Range Opens Aug. 26". Rutland Daily Herald. Rutland, VT. August 24, 1929 – via Newspapers.com.
- "106th 'Pours it on' Nazi Forces". The Republic. Columbus, IN. March 17, 1945 – via Newspapers.com.

Military offices
| Preceded by Newly activated organization | Commanding General 106th Infantry Division; 1943–1944 | Succeeded by Herbert T. Perrin |
