= Army of the United States =

Inactive conscripted force of the US Army

The Army of the United States was one of the four major service components of the United States Army, along with the still existing Regular Army, federalized Army National Guard units, and the United States Army Reserve. However, the Army of the United States has been inactive since the suspension of the draft in 1973 and the U.S. military's transition to an all-volunteer force. Personnel serving in the United States Army during a major national emergency or armed conflict (either voluntarily or involuntarily) were enlisted or inducted into the Army of the United States without specifying service in a component. It also includes the "Retired Reserve". Those are retired soldiers who have reached the required years of creditable service, or creditable service and age; regardless of the component, or components they formerly served in.

The term "Army of the United States" or "Armies of the United States" is also the legal name of the collective land forces of the United States as prescribed by the United States Constitution. In this concept, the term "Army of the United States" has been in use since at least 1841 as in the title General Regulations for the Army of the United States. Also included by Act of the 39th Congress (1866) were the U.S. Volunteers, persons holding a brevetted rank, and the U.S. Veteran Reserve Corps.

== History ==
=== Spanish–American War ===
The Act To provide for temporarily increasing the military establishment of the United States in time of war, and for other purposes of April 22, 1898, provided for a presidential call for two-year volunteers. Shortly after the declaration of war, the President called for and promptly received 125,000 volunteers. Another call for 75,000 volunteers was soon filled. The organization of the Volunteer Army took place through mobilization of existing units of the organized state militias.

The states raised two regiments, two squadrons and nine troops of volunteer cavalry; one regiment, 17 batteries of volunteer artillery, and 119 regiments and 13 battalions of volunteer infantry. The federal government raised three regiments of United States volunteer engineers, three regiments of United States volunteer cavalry (among them the Rough Riders), and 10 regiments of United States volunteer infantry of men immune to tropical diseases.

The aforementioned act provided that the organized and active land forces of the United States would consist of the Army of the United States and of the militia of the several states when called into the service of the United States. In time of war, this army contained two branches designated as the Regular Army and the Volunteer Army of the United States. In August 1898, the strength of the Regular Army was 56,362 men; and of the Volunteer Army, 216,256 men.

=== World War I ===
The original concept of a non-Regular Army component, existing to augment the standing military, can trace its origins to the United States Volunteers. State volunteer forces were used extensively to augment the Regular Army throughout the 19th and early 20th century. During World War I and dictated by the provisions of the National Defense Act of 1916, states contributed men to the "Volunteer Army" (more commonly known as the National Army). During World War I, a standard practice developed for Regular Army officers to serve in higher positions within the National Army, and thus hold two ranks - a permanent rank and a temporary rank. This concept was related to the idea of the brevet rank, which had generally fallen into disuse by the time of the First World War. The National Army was suspended after World War I.

=== World War II ===
In September 1940, the United States reintroduced conscription in response to the increasing likelihood of entry into World War II. Personnel voluntarily enlisting into the United States Army could choose to voluntarily enlist into the Regular Army, National Guard of the United States, or Organized Reserve. On 14 May 1940, legislation provided that all voluntary enlistments in the United States Army during a time of national emergency or war were to be in the Army of the United States "without specification of any particular component or unit thereof." The "Army of the United States" as a service component was formally activated in February 1941. It was legally considered the successor to the National Army.

The Army of the United States saw a major expansion following the 7 December 1941 attack on Pearl Harbor. Enlistments in the Regular Army were suspended for the duration of the war, and on 13 December 1941, legislation provided that personnel inducted into the United States Army under the terms of the Selective Training and Service Act of 1940 were, both retroactively and from that date on, considered to be serving in the Army of the United States.

The first commissioned officers serving in the Army of the United States were appointed from the Regular Army. The standard practice was that these officers held a "permanent rank" within the Regular Army as well as a higher "temporary rank" while serving in the Army of the United States. A typical situation might be a colonel in the AUS holding the permanent rank of captain in the Regular Army. Another term for rank held in the Army of the United States was "theater rank" since the officer was likely to revert to permanent rank if transferred home from the theater of operations.

Promotions within the Army of the United States were sometimes very rapid, and some officers were promoted as many as four to five times in the space of just three to four years. Dwight D. Eisenhower, who served as General of the Army, rose from a colonel to five-star general in three years, holding one-star and two-star ranks for only four months each. However, rank in the AUS could be revoked just as easily, with senior commanders who were relieved reverting to their permanent Regular Army rank. This was known as "loss of theater rank", with some instances of generals returning to the United States in disgrace or at least under a cloud, as only colonels or majors.

==== Divisions of the Army of the United States ====
Division	Date Activated	Campaign Participation Credit
11th Airborne Division	25 February 1943	New Guinea, Southern Philippines, Luzon
13th Airborne Division	15 August 1943	No combat
17th Airborne Division	15 April 1943	Ardennes-Alsace, Rhineland, Central Europe
101st Airborne Division	15 August 1942	Normandy, Rhineland, Ardennes-Alsace, Central Europe
5th Armored Division	10 October 1941	Normandy, Northern France, Rhineland, Central Europe
6th Armored Division	15 February 1942	Normandy, Northern France, Rhineland, Ardennes-Alsace, Central Europe
7th Armored Division	15 February 1942	Northern France, Rhineland, Ardennes-Alsace, Central Europe
8th Armored Division	1 April 1942	Rhineland, Ardennes-Alsace, Central Europe
9th Armored Division	15 July 1942	Rhineland, Ardennes-Alsace, Central Europe
10th Armored Division	15 July 1942	Rhineland, Ardennes-Alsace, Central Europe
11th Armored Division	15 August 1942	Rhineland, Ardennes-Alsace, Central Europe
12th Armored Division	15 September 1942	Rhineland, Ardennes-Alsace, Central Europe
13th Armored Division	15 October 1942	Rhineland, Central Europe
14th Armored Division	15 November 1942	Rhineland, Central Europe
16th Armored Division	15 July 1943	Central Europe
20th Armored Division	15 March 1943	Central Europe
25th Infantry Division	1 October 1941	Central Pacific, Guadalcanal, Northern Solomons, Luzon
42nd Infantry Division	14 July 1943	Ardennes-Alsace, Rhineland, Central Europe
63rd Infantry Division	15 June 1943	Ardennes-Alsace, Rhineland, Central Europe
65th Infantry Division	16 August 1943	Rhineland, Central Europe
66th Infantry Division	15 April 1943	Northern France
69th Infantry Division	15 May 1943	Rhineland, Central Europe
70th Infantry Division	15 June 1943	Rhineland, Central Europe
71st Infantry Division	15 July 1943	Rhineland, Central Europe
75th Infantry Division	15 April 1943	Rhineland, Ardennes-Alsace, Central Europe
92nd Infantry Division	15 October 1942	North Apennines, Po Valley
93rd Infantry Division	15 May 1942	New Guinea, Northern Solomons, Bismarck Archipelago
106th Infantry Division	15 March 1943	Rhineland, Ardennes-Alsace, Central Europe
10th Mountain Division	15 July 1943	North Apennines, Po Valley

In 1946, with postwar demobilization, the Army of the United States was suspended, along with the draft. Officers from that point reverted to Regular Army rank and all enlisted personnel either were discharged from the Army of the United States and returned to civilian life, or accepted the offer to reenlist in the Regular Army. Units raised in the Army of the United States were deactivated; if the Army chose to activate them again permanently, they were allotted to the Regular Army.

=== Korean War and Vietnam War ===
The Army of the United States was demobilized in 1946, but still maintained as a component of the Army. Upon the outbreak of the Korean War, the Army of the United States consisted of conscripts in the Regular Army, with the National Guard and Army of the United States existing simultaneously in the same theater. The system of prefixes before service numbers was as follows:

- ER: Enlisted Reserve
- OR: Officer Reserve
- NG: National Guard
- RA: Regular Army
- US: Army of the United States

The last use of the Army of the United States (AUS) was during the Vietnam War. It was disbanded in 1974.

== Service equivalents ==
There is no equivalent to the Army of the United States in the U.S. Navy, Marine Corps, or Coast Guard. During World War II, officers who joined one of these branches were typically commissioned into the "Naval Reserve," "Marine Corps Reserve," or "Coast Guard Reserve" respectively (the last of these being newly created in the run up to the war), with the understanding that their active service would be only for the duration of the hostilities. In 1948, a component known as the "Air Forces of the United States" (AFUS) was formed to augment Army Air Forces personnel, who held AUS ranks, into the newly created United States Air Force.
