= Structural evil =

A re-enactment of the Milgram experiment in which unsuspecting subjects would inflict pain upon others when instructed to do so in a respectable setting.

Structural evil or systemic evil is evil which arises from structures within human society, rather than from individual wickedness or religious conceptions such as original sin. One example of structural evil within a society would be slavery.

Structural evil arises within human societies because of the way humans act. Multiple individuals have commented and theorized on the subject of structural evil. Among these early thinkers are Rousseau and Robespierre. However, more modern thinkers on this subject are Thomas Nagel, Claudia Card, Cynthia D. Moe-Lobeda, and John Langan.

== Early Thinkers ==
=== Jean-Jacques Rousseau ===
Rousseau proposed that the structures of human society were the main source of evil in his works such as the Discourse on Inequality (Discours sur l'origine et les fondements de l'inégalité parmi les hommes). He believed that humans are good by nature, but are rendered corrupt by society. Rousseau's reasoning is as follows: if society is supposedly composed of entirely naturally good human beings, then how can evil come about? It must come about because of the structures that are present in human society. These ideas were influential upon French revolutionaries such as Robespierre.

== Modern Thinkers ==
=== Thomas Nagel ===
Thomas Nagel is a modern philosopher who has argued that the great evils of the 20th century, such as genocide, required extensive structural support from the societies in which they occurred. He believes that while a few individuals have the capacity to hurt other individuals, the capacity needed to deliver the amount of destructiveness found in the great evils of the 20th century requires extensive organizational structure. Individuals, such as Adolf Hitler, Josef Stalin, and Pol Pot, he noted may have been able to influence a whole society; however, they achieved this through manipulation of a wider social structure.

=== Claudia Card ===
Claudia Card is another modern theorist who has defined structural evil as being intolerable harm which results from the normal operation of social structures.^{[4]} Her list of such institutions is controversial as it includes marriage and motherhood.

=== John Langan ===
John Langan, an American author, criticized and summarized Pope John Paul II ideas of how structural evil arises. Langan states, "Institutions, structures, and societies are not the subject of moral acts, ... 'social sins are the result of the accumulation and concentration of many personal sins.'" After stating this, he points out a few criticisms in Pope John Paul II's theory.

=== Cynthia D. Moe-Lobeda ===
Cynthia D. Moe-Lobeda proposed that structural evil is seen in everyday life and disguised through good, inevitability, divine mandate, and social necessity. In her book Resisting Structural Evil Moe-Lobeda states that structural evil consists of "chains that bind us into systemic exploitation of others and of the Earth" which are intricate and cleverly hidden. These "chains" come from the outside forces that include: power arrangements, ideologies, values, practices, and policies. According to Moe-Lobeda, structural evil may go beyond the physical power of individuals to counter, but it is composed of power arrangements and other forces that are humanly constructed.

== Structural Evil in global Societies ==
According to Andrew Basden, a professor of Human Factors and Philosophy in Information Systems at Salford Business School at the University of Salford: Manchester, structural evil builds up and prevails because individuals contribute to its creation, accept it without protest to it and done so over a long period of time. He also puts for that there is not just one kind of structural evil, but rather that there are many.

== See also ==
- Collective guilt
- Don't be evil
