= Woodruff (surname) =

Woodruff is a surname. Notable people with the surname include:

- Abraham O. Woodruff (1872–1904), member of the Quorum of the Twelve Apostles of The Church of Jesus Christ of Latter-day Saints, and son of Wilford Woodruff
- Blake Woodruff (born 1995), actor
- Bille Woodruff, video and film director
- Bob Woodruff, an American journalist
- Bob Woodruff (American football) former University of Florida and Baylor University head football coach
- Bob Woodruff (singer), American country musician
- Bobby Woodruff (born 1940), former professional footballer
- Brandon Woodruff, American baseball pitcher
- Carle Augustus Woodruff (1841–1913), U.S. Army brigadier general and Medal of Honor recipient
- C. E. Woodruff, American reverend, educator, and college football coach
- Chris Woodruff (born 1973), American tennis player
- Christian B. Woodruff (1828–1871), New york politician
- D. P. Woodruff, British physicist
- Dwayne Woodruff (born 1957), American football player
- Elvira Woodruff (born 1951), American children's writer
- Ernest Woodruff (1863–1944), Atlanta businessman who took over Coca-Cola
- Freddie Woodruff, American officer
- George Cecil Woodruff, an American businessman and football coach
- George Washington Woodruff, an American football coach as well as a teacher, lawyer and politician
- Gianna Woodruff (born 1993), Panamanian hurdler
- Hale Woodruff (1900–1980), American painter
- Helen Woodruff, multiple people
- Hubert W. Woodruff (1923–2019), American politician
- James E. P. Woodruff (1937--2002), American civil rights activist and Episcopalian priest
- John Woodruff (disambiguation), several people
- JT Woodruff, guitarist and lead vocalist of Hawthorne Heights
- Judy Woodruff, a TV journalist
- Lewis Bartholomew Woodruff (1809–1875), New York judge
- Maurice Woodruff (1916–1973), a British clairvoyant and astrologer
- Michael Woodruff, a pioneer in transplantation biology and surgery
- Paul Woodruff, philosophy and classics professor, University of Texas at Austin
- Richard Woodruff (Upper Canada politician) (1784–1872)
- Robert Woodruff (disambiguation), several people
- Rosalie Woodruff, Australian politician
- Roscoe B. Woodruff (1891–1975), American general
- Roy O. Woodruff (1876–1953), U.S. Representative from Michigan
- Sarah Woodruff, the main character of The French Lieutenant's Woman
- Teresa Woodruff, American reproductive scientist
- Thomas Woodruff (born 1957), American artist
- Thomas M. Woodruff (1804–1855), U.S. Congressman from New York
- Theodore Tuttle Woodruff (1811–1892), American inventor of the sleeping car for railroads. Founder of Woodruff Sleeping & Palace Car Company, Central Transportation Company, Woodruff Sleeping & Parlor Coach Company and Union Palace Car Company
- Timothy L. Woodruff (1858–1913), Lieutenant Governor of New York
- William Woodruff (disambiguation), multiple people
- Wilford Woodruff, fourth President of The Church of Jesus Christ of Latter-day Saints
