= John Woodruff =

John Woodruff may refer to:

- John Woodruff (runner) (1915–2007), American middle-distance runner
- John Woodruff (Connecticut politician) (1826–1868), American politician from Connecticut
- John Woodruff (director) (fl. 2000s–2010s), American actor and director
- John Woodruff (talent manager) (fl.1980s–2010s), Australian talent manager, record label owner
- John I. Woodruff (1864–1962), American football coach and politician from Pennsylvania

== See also ==
- John Woodroffe (1865–1936), British Orientalist
