= Willis D. Crittenberger =

United States Army general (1890–1980)

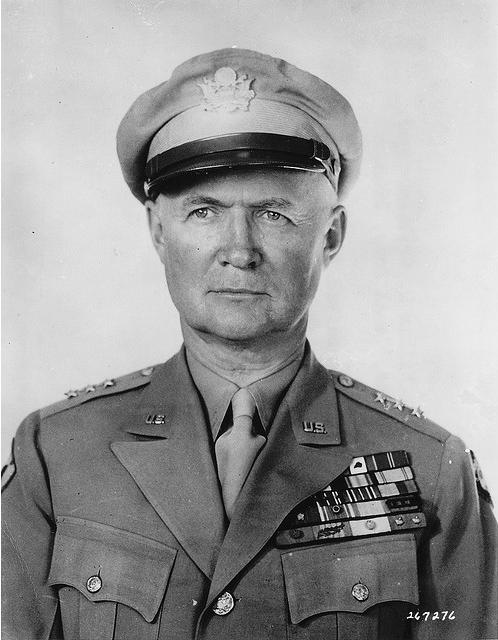
- Born: December 2, 1890; Baltimore, Maryland, United States
- Died: August 4, 1980 (aged 89); Chevy Chase, Maryland, United States
- Burial place: Arlington National Cemetery, Arlington, United States
- Military career
- Allegiance: United States
- Branch: United States Army
- Service years: 1913–1952
- Rank: Lieutenant General
- Nickname: "Crit"
- Service number: 0-3548
- Unit: Cavalry Branch
- Commands: First Army; Caribbean Command; Caribbean Defense Command; IV Corps; XIX Corps; III Armored Corps; 2nd Armored Division; 2nd Armored Brigade
- Conflicts: World War I World War II
- Awards: Army Distinguished Service Medal (2); Bronze Star Medal (3); Officer of the Legion of Honor (France); Croix de Guerre (France); Order of Abdon Calderón (Ecuador); Orden de Merito Militar (Peru)

Lieutenant General Willis Dale Crittenberger (December 2, 1890 – August 4, 1980) was a senior officer of the United States Army. He was a career soldier who served with distinction during the Italian campaign of World War II

== Early life and military career ==
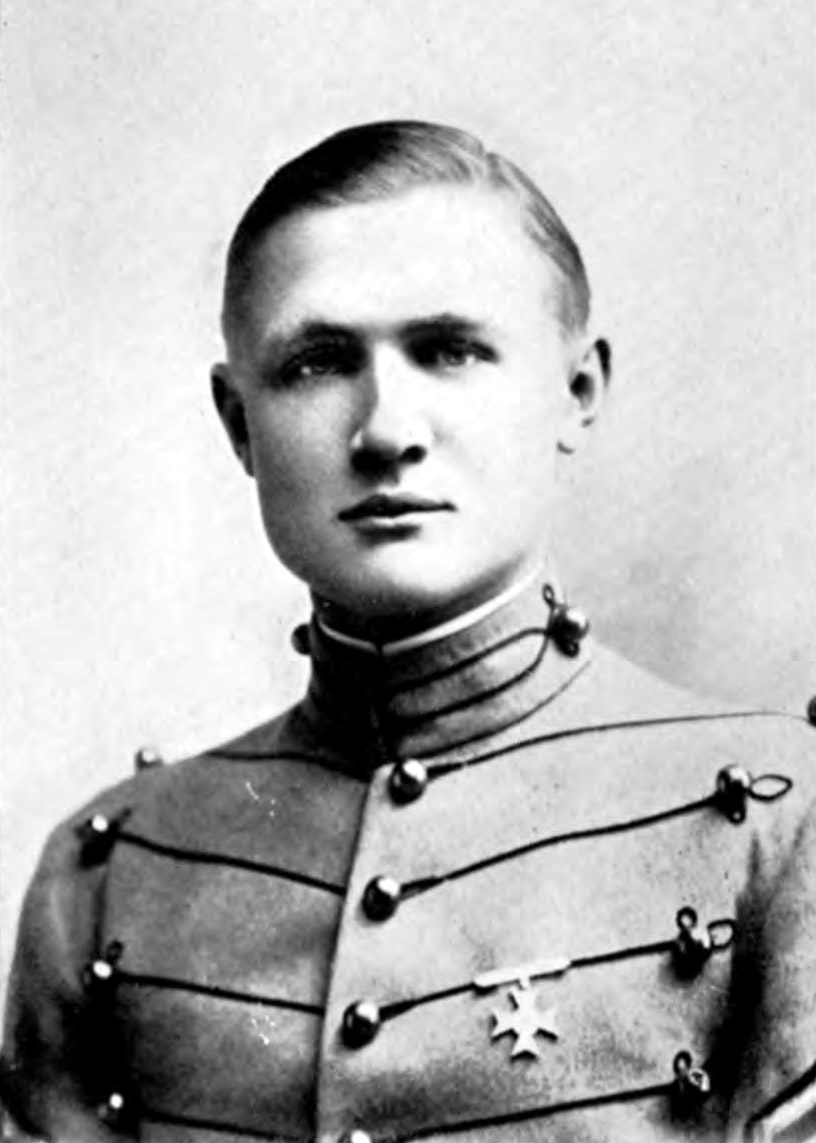
At West Point in 1913

Crittenberger was born in Baltimore, Maryland on December 2, 1890. After growing up in Anderson, Indiana, he was appointed to the United States Military Academy (USMA) at West Point, New York, in 1909, graduating 24th in his class four years later on June 12, 1913, with the West Point class of 1913, two years ahead of fellow cadet, friend and infantry officer, Dwight D. Eisenhower. Crittenberger was then commissioned as a second lieutenant in the Cavalry Branch of the United States Army and his first posting was with the 3rd Cavalry Regiment, then stationed at Fort Hood, Texas.

== Between the wars ==
Unable to see service overseas in World War I, where he remained in the United States training recruits, Crittenberger's advanced military education included the United States Army Cavalry School at Fort Riley, Kansas, in 1924, the United States Army Command and General Staff College at Fort Leavenworth, Kansas in 1925 and the United States Army War College at Washington Barracks in Washington, D.C., in 1930. After assignments to Fort Knox, Kentucky, the 1st Cavalry Regiment (Mechanized)'s new home in 1934, he served on staff positions to the Chief of Cavalry in Washington and, towards the end of the interwar period, realizing that the cavalry's role in any future conflict would be limited (as World War I and trench warfare had proved), becoming increasingly interested in armored warfare, and became chief of staff for the 1st Armored Division. On August 1, 1935, he was promoted to lieutenant colonel and, on June 17, 1941, to the temporary rank of colonel.

== World War II ==
With the onset of the United States entry into World War II, Crittenberger, with the rank of brigadier general (having been promoted on July 10, 1941), was commanding the 2nd Armored Brigade of the 2nd Armored Division, under Major General George S. Patton. In February 1942, two months after the Japanese attack on Pearl Harbor on December 7, 1941, and the German declaration of war on the United States four days later, Crittenberger was promoted to the temporary rank of major general on February 16 and assumed command of the division while Patton was sent to command the I Armored Corps. His permanent rank was upgraded from lieutenant colonel to colonel on July 1, and, in August, after relinquishing command of the 2nd Armored Division to Major General Ernest N. Harmon, Crittenberger organized, trained and commanded the III Armored Corps, then composed of the 7th and 11th Armored Divisions, at Camp Polk, Louisiana. Redesignated as XIX Corps in October 1943, Crittenberger brought XIX Corps to England in January 1944.

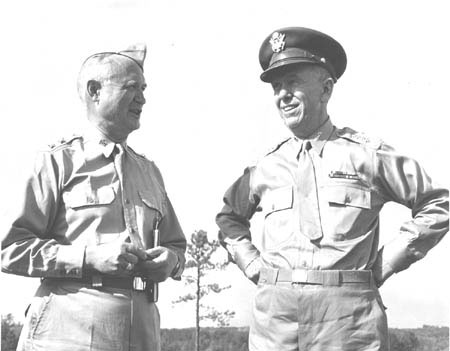
On the left, Major General Willis D. Crittenberger and, on the right, General George C. Marshall, the U.S. Army Chief of Staff, at Fort Benning, Georgia, June 1942

In early 1944, General Dwight D. Eisenhower, the Supreme Allied Commander for the impending Allied invasion of Normandy, initially selected Crittenberger as one of three corps commanders for the invasion. The others were Major General Leonard T. Gerow, commanding V Corps, and Major General Roscoe B. Woodruff, commanding VII Corps. All three were well-known and trusted by General Eisenhower. However, Lieutenant General Omar Bradley, whom Eisenhower selected as the First Army commander for the D-Day invasion, replaced Eisenhower's picks, seeking differing temperaments and commanders that had more combat experience. At the same time, Lieutenant General Jacob L. Devers, Commanding General (CG) of the North African Theater of Operations, United States Army (NATOUSA), was seeking a corps commander for the U.S. Fifth Army's IV Corps for the Italian campaign and Crittenberger was chosen. Devers had in fact requested Crittenberger's services and thought highly of him, writing, "I consider Crittenberger to be one of my best commanders."

Crittenberger relinquished command of XIX Corps, briefly, to Major General Woodruff, who soon handed over to Major General Charles H. Corlett, a classmate from the West Point class of 1913, and departed England for the Mediterranean Theater of Operations (MTO), assuming command of IV Corps from Major General Alexander Patch, another West Point classmate, in Italy on March 20, 1944. Held in reserve during the early stages of the Italian campaign, IV Corps replaced the VI Corps, under Major General Lucian Truscott, in the front line after the liberation of the Italian capital of Rome in early June. Crittenberger's corps, coming under command of Lieutenant General Mark W. Clark's American Fifth Army (which, together with the British Eighth Army, formed part of the Allied Armies in Italy/AAI, later redesignated as the 15th Army Group, commanded by British General Sir Harold Alexander) later fought on through the Gothic Line, in some of the toughest and most difficult fighting of the Italian campaign.

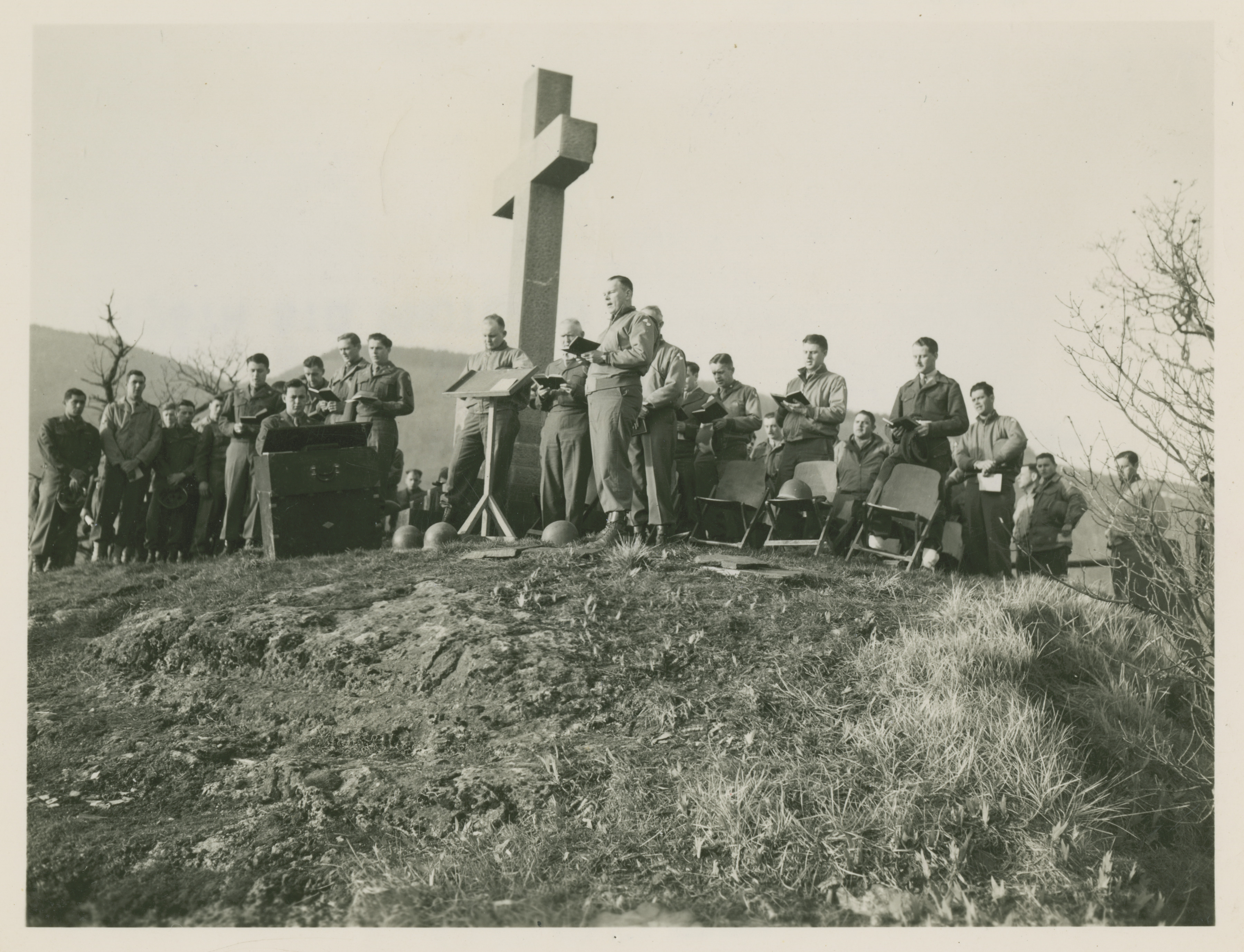
Chaplain Paul J. Maddox conducting Easter sunrise services for men of IV Corps, Castelluccia, Italy, April 1, 1945. In front is the commander of IV Corps, Major General Willis D. Crittenberger.

Having the 1st Brazilian Infantry and the 6th South African Armoured Divisions in its ranks, in addition to the United States 1st Armored, the 92nd Infantry and the 10th Mountain Divisions, Crittenberger's IV Corps were in combat for over 390 days, 326 of them engaged in continuous combat. Crittenberger commanded IV Corps, still part of the Fifth Army, now commanded by Lieutenant General Lucian Truscott (like Crittenberger, a cavalryman whom Crittenberger had taught while he was an instructor at the U.S. Army Cavalry School), after Lieutenant General Clark was promoted to the command of 15th Army Group, as the western arm of the Allied thrust through northern Italy (codenamed Operation Grapeshot) to the Po River, capturing large numbers of German troops, and which ultimately ended with the surrender of the remaining German forces in Italy on May 2, 1945. The end of World War II in Europe came soon after, as did a promotion for Crittenberger to the temporary rank of lieutenant general on June 3, This was followed by the surrender of Japan on September 2, 1945, almost exactly six years since the war had begun.

During the campaign in Italy Crittenberger, who Eisenhower initially had doubts over, gained the respect of his superiors, such as Clark, Devers, and Truscott, the latter of whom wrote, "He [Crittenberger] has been outstanding during my entire time with the Fifth Army. He is in my opinion a better corps commander and a better battlefield leader than Geoff (Geoffrey Keyes), a West Point classmate and the commander of II Corps throughout the campaign."

== Postwar career ==
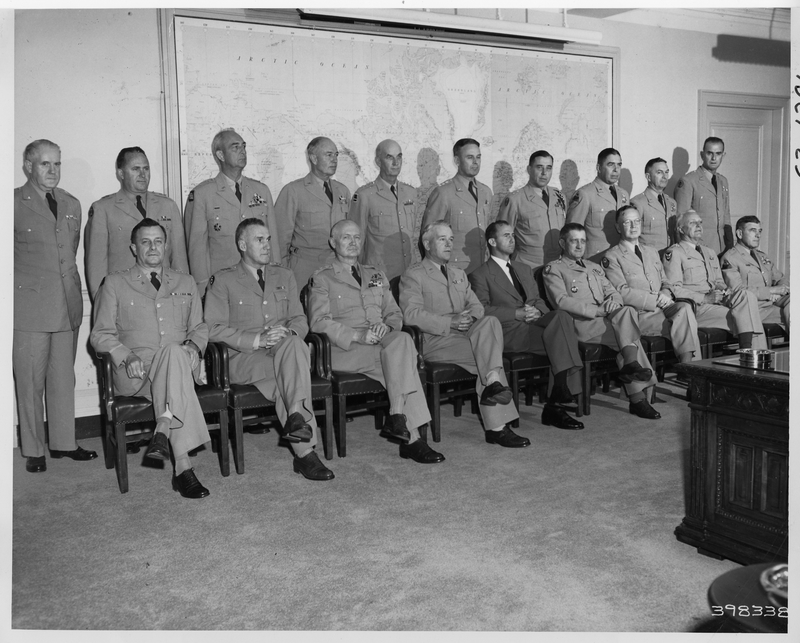
Army commanders in the United States and certain overseas commanders meet with Secretary of the Army Frank Pace and General J. Lawton Collins, Army Chief of Staff, in the Pentagon in routine sessions, June 5, 1952. Lieutenant General Willis D. Crittenberger is sat third from the left, between Lieutenant General Edward H. Brooks (left) and General Collins.

In the postwar years Crittenberger, whose permanent rank was advanced from colonel to brigadier general on June 23, 1946, commanded the Caribbean Defense Command, including the Panama Canal Zone, then in 1947, became first commander-in-chief of United States Caribbean Command, a regional unified theater command and predecessor to today's United States Southern Command. January 24, 1948, saw his permanent rank promoted to major general. After a two-year stint as Commanding General of the First Army, at Fort Jay, Governors Island, New York, Crittenberger concluded his active duty military career in December 1952, leaving New York City with a ticker tape parade up Broadway.

== Civilian career ==
In retirement, Crittenberger advised President Dwight D. Eisenhower on national security matters. Crittenberger served as president of the United States Military Academy Association of Graduates from 1955 to 1958 and president of the Greater New York Fund.

Crittenberger was Chairman of the Free Europe Committee for three years, from 1956 to 1959.

== Family ==
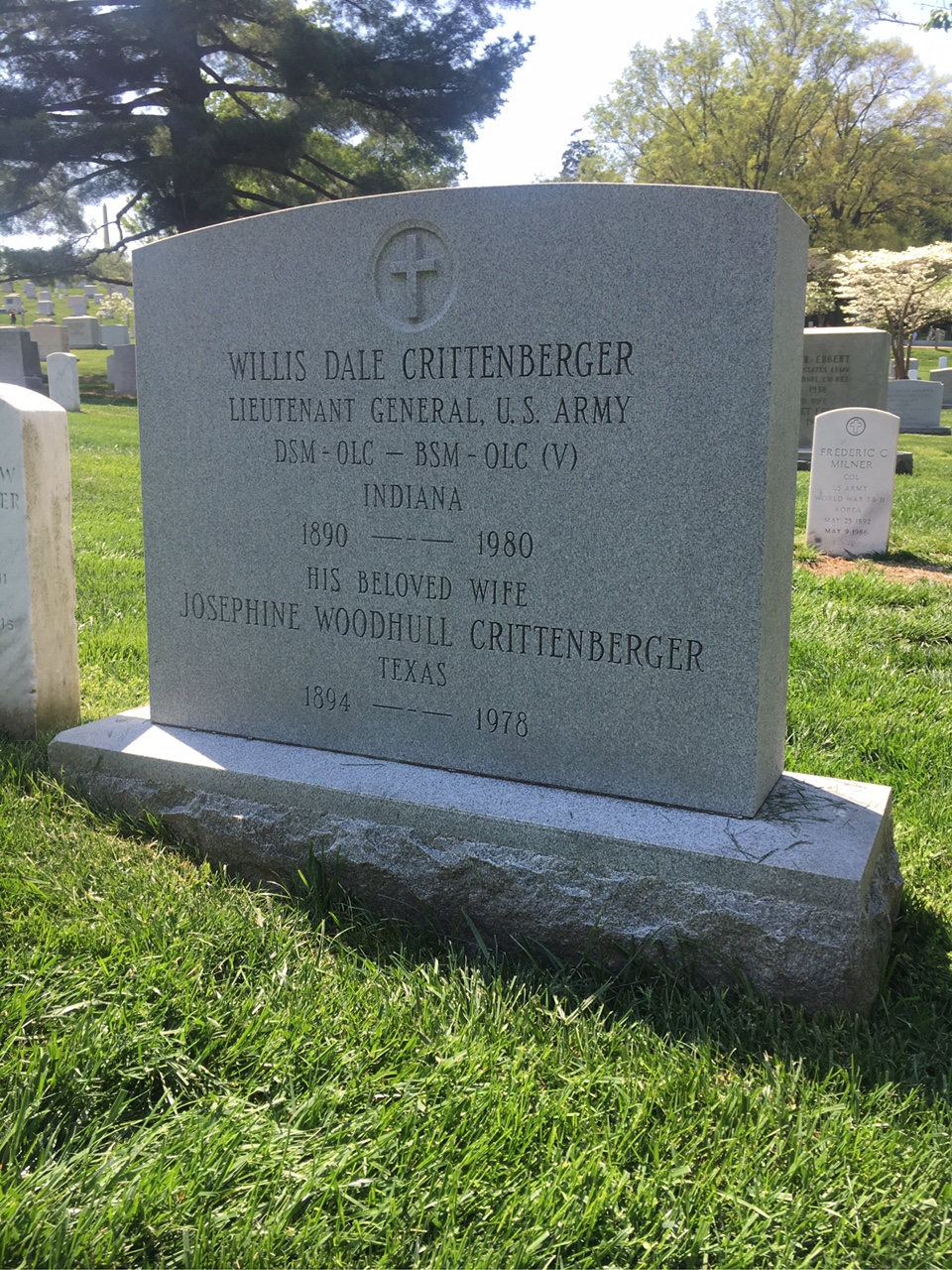
The grave of Lieutenant General Willis Dale Crittenberger at Arlington National Cemetery

Crittenberger married Josephine Frost Woodhull (1894–1978) on June 23, 1918. Two of his three sons served in the United States Armed Forces and died in combat. Corporal Townsend Woodhull Crittenberger (born May 13, 1925) was killed in action during the Rhine River crossing on March 25, 1945, during the final days of World War II, aged just 19. Colonel Dale Jackson Crittenberger (USMA 1950) (born May 27, 1927) commanding the 3rd Brigade of the 9th Infantry Division during the Vietnam War was killed in a mid-air collision on September 17, 1969, while directing combat operations, aged 42. Dale served as a White House military aide to President Eisenhower in 1959 and as a newly promoted major received his new badge of rank from his father's old friend, the President.

A third son, Willis D. Crittenberger Jr. (USMA 1942) also served in the United States Army in World War II with the 10th Armored Division, rising from lieutenant to lieutenant colonel during the war, retiring as a major general. He later was a spokesman for the Daughters of the American Revolution.

Lieutenant General Willis Dale Crittenberger died in Chevy Chase, Maryland, on August 4, 1980, at the age of 89. He was buried at Arlington National Cemetery, Virginia with his wife and sons, Townsend and Dale.

== Decorations ==
Army Distinguished Service Medal with Oak Leaf Cluster
Bronze Star Medal with two Oak Leaf Clusters
Mexican Border Service Medal
World War I Victory Medal
American Defense Service Medal
American Campaign Medal
European–African–Middle Eastern Campaign Medal with four Service Stars
World War II Victory Medal
National Defense Service Medal
Officer of the Legion of Honor (France)
Croix de Guerre (France)
Order of Abdon Calderón (Ecuador)
Orden de Merito Militar (Peru)

== Books ==
- The final campaign across Italy; 1952 – His memoirs as commander of US Army IV Corps ISBN 85-7011-219-X
- Some thoughts on civil defense; 1954 4pgs Essay
- Debrief report; 1967 Dept. of the Army – Headquarters, II Field Force Vietnam Artillery 21pgs report

Military offices
Preceded by George S. Patton	Commanding General 2nd Armored Division; February–July 1942	Succeeded by Ernest N. Harmon
Preceded by Newly activated organization	Commanding General III Armored Corps; 1942–1943	Post redesignated XIX Corps
Preceded by Newly activated organization	Commanding General XIX Corps; 1943–1944	Succeeded by Roscoe B. Woodruff
Preceded by Alexander Patch	Commanding General IV Corps; 1944–1945	Post deactivated
Preceded by Roscoe B. Woodruff	Commanding General First Army; 1950–1952	Succeeded by Withers A. Burress
