= Order of Abdon Calderón =

Order of Abdón Calderón

Awarded by Ecuador
- Type: Order
- Awarded for: Extraordinary military service
- Status: Currently constituted
- Grades: First Class; Second Class; Third Class

Statistics
- First induction: 1904

Precedence
- Next (higher): National Order of Merit
- Next (lower): National Order of Honorato Vásquez
- Ribbon bars of the order (from top to bottom): First Class, Second Class and Third Class

The Order of Abdón Calderón is an Ecuadorian decoration instituted in 1904 and awarded for extraordinary military service. It is named after Abdón Calderón, the revolutionary hero who died from injuries sustained on May 24, 1822 during the Battle of Pichincha.

== Grades and distinctions ==
Recipients are awarded the decoration for extraordinary military service.

The order has three grades:

- First Class
- Second Class
- Third Class

The ribbon of the order is half yellow, half blue and red. The class of the order is denoted by a star. The First Class star is gold, Second Class is silver, and Third Class is bronze.

== Notable recipients ==
- Edward M. Almond
- Frank Maxwell Andrews
- Edwin Burr Babbitt
- Bernhard of Lippe-Biesterfeld
- Alfred Winsor Brown
- Charles H. Corlett
- Malin Craig
- Willis D. Crittenberger
- Pedro del Valle
- Jimmy Doolittle
- Robert L. Eichelberger
- Dwight D. Eisenhower
- Edward Ellsberg
- William Halsey, Jr.
- Thomas T. Handy
- Harold D. Hansen
- Harold R. Harris
- Samuel M. Hogan
- Ernest King
- Henry Balding Lewis
- Douglas MacArthur
- George Marshall
- Paco Moncayo
- John C. Munn
- Chester W. Nimitz
- James Garesche Ord
- Harvey Overesch
- Alexander Patch
- Augusto Pinochet
- Cosimo Rennella
- William R. Schmidt
- John F. Shafroth Jr.
- Lemuel C. Shepherd, Jr.
- Alexander Vandegrift
- Francis Bowditch Wilby
- Charles A. Willoughby
