= IV Corps (United States) =

- Shoulder sleeve insignia
- Active: 20 June 1918–11 May 1919; 29 July 1921–13 October 1945; 15 October 1958–1 April 1968
- Country: United States of America
- Branch: United States Army
- Role: Headquarters
- Size: Corps
- Engagements: World War I; St. Mihiel; Lorraine 1918; World War II; Rome-Arno; North Apennines; Po Valley

Commanders
- Notable commanders: Charles Henry Muir; Douglas MacArthur; Stanley Dunbar Embick; Alexander Patch; Willis D. Crittenberger

Insignia
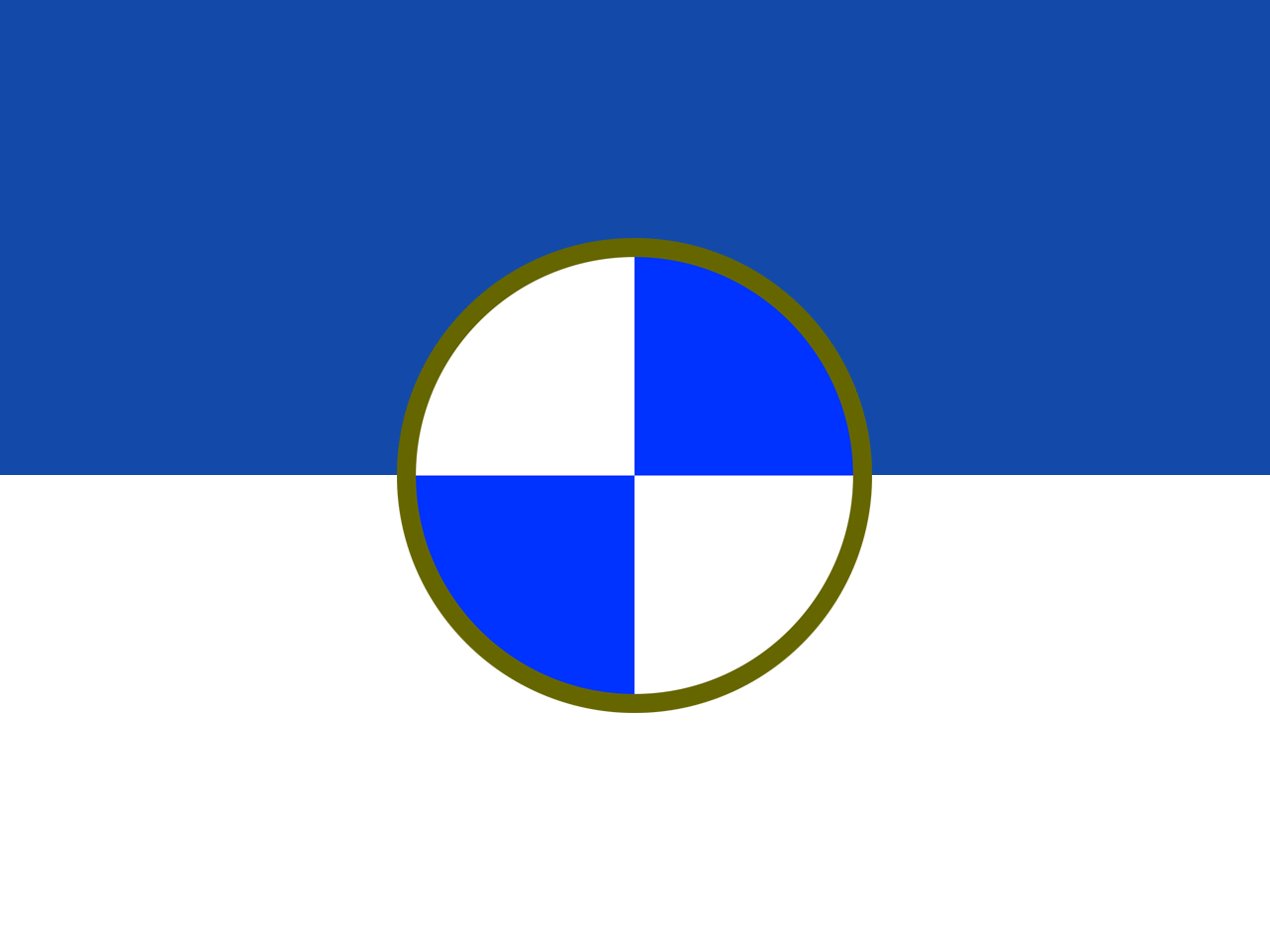
- IV Corps Flag

IV Corps was a corps-sized formation of the United States Army that saw service in both World War I and World War II.

== World War I ==
The corps was first organized on 20 June 1918, during World War I as part of the American Expeditionary Forces. Under Major General Charles H. Muir serving on the Western Front, as Headquarters IV Army Corps. It participated in the offensives of St. Mihiel and Lorraine, being demobilized in Germany on 11 May 1919.

== Interwar period ==
The IV Corps was reconstituted in the Organized Reserve in 1921, allotted to the Fourth Corps Area, assigned to the Second United States Army, and activated with a headquarters composed of Regular Army and Organized Reserve personnel at Atlanta, Georgia, on 1 March 1922. The Headquarters Company was initiated on 29 March 1922 in Atlanta. on 15 June 1925, the headquarters was relieved from active duty, with all Regular Army personnel passing to the control of the Headquarters, Non-Divisional Group, Fourth Corps Area, which assumed the responsibilities of the IV Corps headquarters; both the Headquarters and Headquarters Company remained active in the Organized Reserve. The Headquarters, IV Corps, was withdrawn from the Organized Reserve on 15 August 1927 and allotted to the Regular Army, as was the Headquarters Company on 1 October 1933. The corps headquarters was partially activated at Atlanta with Regular Army personnel from the corps area headquarters and Reserve personnel from the corps area at large. On 1 October 1933, the IV Corps was relieved from the Second Army and assigned to the Third Army. For major maneuvers and command post exercises in the 1930s, the corps headquarters was occasionally organized provisionally using its assigned Reserve officers and staff officers from the Fourth Corps Area. The corps headquarters was fully activated on 20 October 1939, less Reserve personnel, at Fort Benning, Georgia.

== World War II ==
Continuing the lineage of the World War I IV Corps, a second IV Corps was constituted in the Regular Army and activated on 27 June 1944 in Italy, being consolidated with the second, active, IV Corps that had been formed in 1922. IV Corps replaced the VI Corps in the U.S. Fifth Army's order of battle in the Italian campaign, after Allied forces liberated Rome in the summer of 1944 and VI Corps was subsequently withdrawn from Italy to take part in Operation Dragoon, the Allied invasion of southern France. Initially the corps had two divisions—the U.S. 1st and South African 6th Armoured Divisions—but was reinforced with the U.S. 92nd Infantry Division from August, the 1st Brazilian Infantry Division from September, and the U.S. 10th Mountain Division in February 1945, as well as the U.S. 85th Infantry Division in April.

Under command of Major General Willis D. Crittenberger, the IV Corps took part in the fighting through the summer of 1944 as the Fifth Army, under the command of Lieutenant General Mark W. Clark, and the British Eighth Army, commanded by Lieutenant General Sir Oliver W. H. Leese, advanced north to the River Arno. In the autumn and winter of 1944, the IV Corps formed the central wing of the Fifth Army's sector, taking the major role in the Fifth Army's assault on the Gothic Line in the central Apennine Mountains, fighting to break through to the Lombardy plains beyond.

== Inactivation ==
In the spring of 1945 the corps, still in the Fifth Army's central sector, took part in the successful Italian spring offensive, breaking out of the Apennines to outflank the units of the German Tenth and Fourteenth Armies defending Bologna and forming a pincer with the British Eighth Army on the right to surround them, and then driving on to the River Po and finally Verona and Brescia.

The corps was inactivated on 13 October 1945, at Camp Kilmer, New Jersey, it was reactivated again at Birmingham, Alabama, in 1958 and inactivated at Birmingham in 1968.

== Bibliography ==
- Clark, Mark Wayne. Calculated Risk. New York: Enigma Books, 1950, republished 2007. ISBN 978-1-929631-59-9
- Moraes, Mascarenhas de, The Brazilian Expeditionary Force, By Its Commander US Government Printing Office, 1966. ASIN B000PIBXCG
- Crittenberger, Willis D., "The final campaign across Italy"; (1st Print 1952) ISBN 85-7011-219-X (of 1997 printing (in Portuguese) )
- Wilson, John B. "Armies, Corps, Divisions, and Separate Brigades | Army Lineage Series" U.S. Government Printing Office, 1999. CMH Pub 60-7-1. ISBN 0160499925
