= Frederick Augustus Irving =

United States Army general (1894–1995)

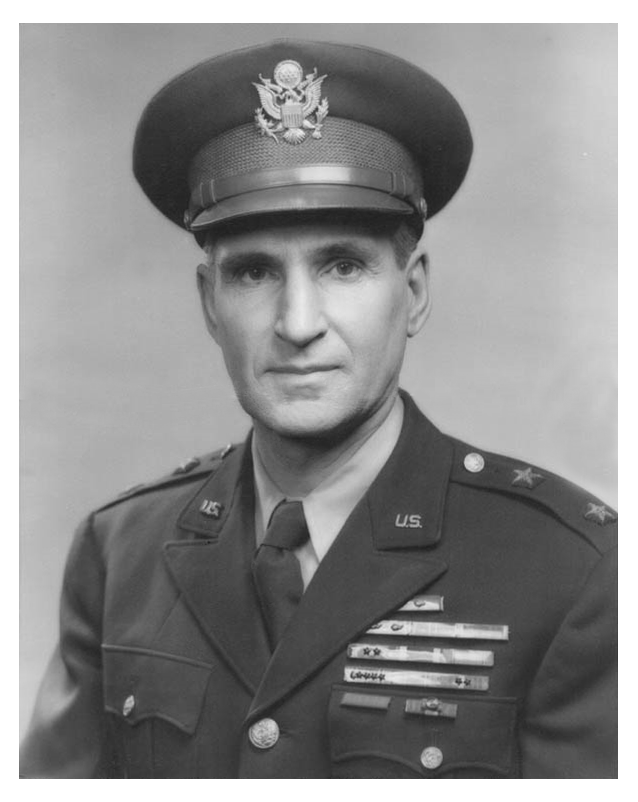
- Born: September 3, 1894; Taunton, Massachusetts, U.S.
- Died: September 12, 1995 (aged 101); Alexandria, Virginia, U.S.
- Military career
- Allegiance: United States
- Branch: United States Army
- Service years: 1917–1954
- Rank: Major General
- Unit: Infantry Branch
- Commands: 24th Infantry Division; United States Military Academy
- Conflicts: World War I World War II
- Awards: Silver Star (3); Legion of Merit (2); Bronze Star; Purple Heart

Major General Frederick Augustus Irving (September 3, 1894 – September 12, 1995) was a United States Army officer who served in both World War I and World War II and was superintendent of the United States Military Academy from 1951 to 1954 and eventually lived to the age of 101.

== Military career ==
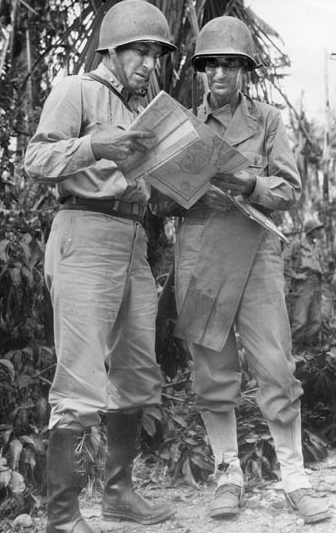
Major General Franklin C. Sibert (left), commanding X Corps, confers with Major General Frederick A. Irving, commanding the 24th Infantry Division, at a forward command post during the invasion of Leyte, Philippines, 1943.

Frederick Augustus Irving was born in Massachusetts on September 3, 1894. He entered the United States Military Academy (USMA) at West Point, New York in June 1913, from where he graduated 53rd in a class of 139 on April 20, 1917, exactly two weeks after the American entry into World War I, as a second lieutenant of Infantry.

His first assignment upon receiving his commission was with the 35th Infantry Regiment, then serving in Nogales, Arizona. While serving with his regiment, he received two promotions, to first lieutenant on May 15, 1917, and to temporary captain on August 5.

In September he transferred over to the 11th Infantry Regiment, at the time stationed at Chickamauga, Georgia, where he became a company commander until January 1918, by which time the regiment had been assigned to the newly activated 5th Division. That month saw Irving move on again, now to the 15th Machine Gun Battalion, also part of the 5th Division, with which he would remain for the rest of the war, again taking command of a company.

Along with the rest of the 5th Division, Irving departed for service on the Western Front to join the American Expeditionary Forces (AEF) in the spring of 1918. After arriving in France, Irving, after holding the line with his battalion for several weeks, went on to see action in the St. Mihiel offensive in September. He was wounded during the battle and subsequently received the Silver Star for "leading his company through heavy artillery and machine gun fire." He saw no further action during the war, which ended with the Armistice with Germany on November 11, which saw Irving still in hospital.

Irving was also active during the interwar period, during which he attended the United States Army Command and General Staff College, and in World War II, leading the 24th Infantry Division during the invasions of Hollandia, New Guinea and Leyte in the Philippines, before being suddenly, and without much explanation, removed from his command in late 1944 by Lieutenant General Walter Krueger, commander of the Sixth Army. He was replaced by Major General Roscoe B. Woodruff who, after serving as a division and corps commander earlier in the war, and was then serving in the Pacific, apparently had little to do. Before that he was commandant of cadets at West Point from 1941 to 1942 and had served from March to August 1942 as the 24th Division's Assistant Division Commander (ADC) before being promoted to command the division.

Irving's service in the American military extended thirty-seven years, and he retired from service in 1954. He died in 1995 of congestive heart failure at Mount Vernon Hospital in Alexandria, Virginia, shortly after turning 101.

Military offices
Preceded by Durward S. Wilson	Commanding General 24th Infantry Division; 1942–1944	Succeeded by Roscoe B. Woodruff
Preceded by Bryant Moore	Superintendent of the United States Military Academy; 1951–1954	Succeeded by Blackshear M. Bryan
