= Alexander Patch =

United States Army general (1889–1945)

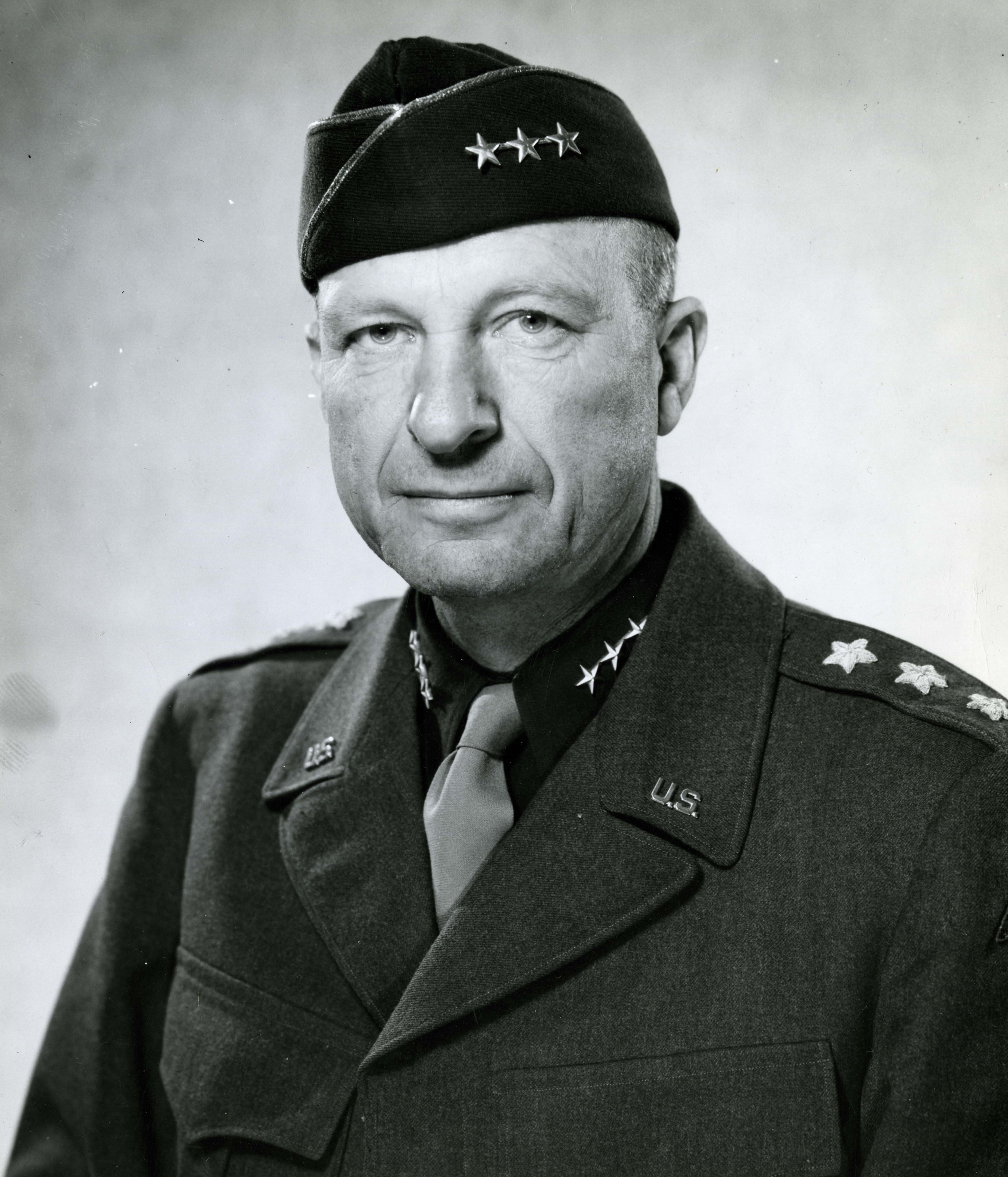
- LTG Patch, new commander of Fourth Army, August 1945
- Born: Alexander McCarrell Patch; 23 November 1889; Fort Huachuca, Arizona Territory, U.S.
- Died: 21 November 1945 (aged 55); Fort Sam Houston, Texas, U.S.
- Burial place: West Point Cemetery, West Point, New York, U.S.
- Relatives: Joseph D. Patch (brother)
- Military career
- Allegiance: United States
- Branch: United States Army
- Service years: 1913–1945
- Rank: General
- Nickname: "Sandy"
- Service number: 0-3589
- Unit: Infantry Branch
- Commands: 3rd Machine Gun Battalion, 1st Division; 1st Battalion, 18th Infantry Regiment; 47th Infantry Regiment; Task Force 6814; Americal Division; XIV Corps; IV Corps; Seventh Army; Fourth Army
- Conflicts: Pancho Villa Expedition; World War I World War II
- Awards: Army Distinguished Service Medal (3); Navy Distinguished Service Medal; Bronze Star

Alexander McCarrell Patch (23 November 1889 – 21 November 1945) was a senior United States Army officer who fought in both world wars, rising to rank of general. During World War II, he commanded U.S. Army and Marine Corps forces during the Guadalcanal campaign in the Pacific, and the Seventh Army on the Western Front in Europe.

With an invasion of Japan still an apparent likelihood, Patch returned to the U.S. in August 1945 to take charge of the Fourth Army headquartered at Fort Sam Houston, Texas. He died three months later in November 1945 at age 55, his health having been ravaged during his time in the Pacific early in the war. "Sandy" Patch and Lucian Truscott were the only two U.S. Army officers on active service during World War II to command a division, corps, and field army.

In July 1954, he was posthumously promoted from his rank of lieutenant general to four-star general.

== Early life and military career ==
Patch was born at Fort Huachuca, Arizona Territory and raised in Pennsylvania. His father, Captain Alexander M. Patch, was a former cavalryman in the United States Army and a graduate (1877) of the United States Military Academy (USMA) at West Point, and his mother was Annie Moore Patch, the daughter of Congressman William S. Moore of Pennsylvania.

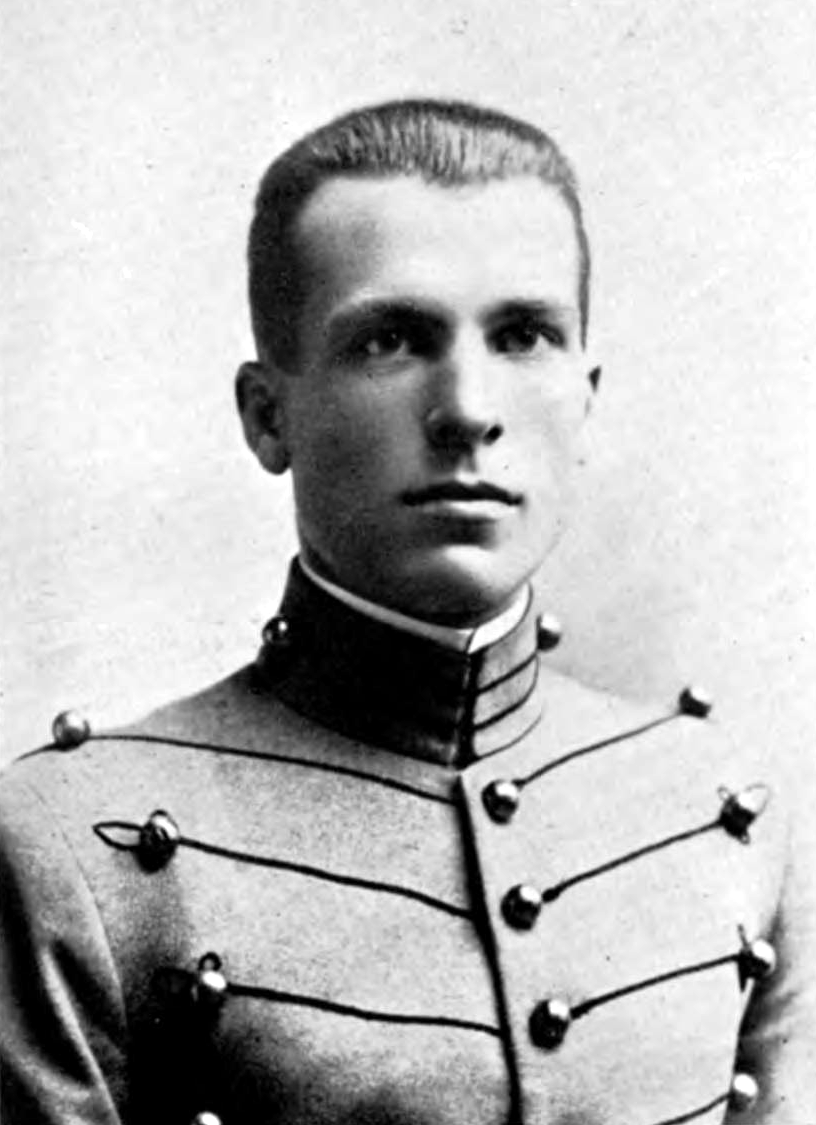
At West Point in 1913

Of German, Scottish, and Irish descent, Patch attended Lehigh University for a year, then received an appointment to West Point in 1909. His eldest brother Joseph Dorst Patch, commonly known as "Dorst", also enlisted in the army the same year. Originally interested in joining the cavalry, but realizing that it was becoming obsolete, Alexander Patch chose the Infantry Branch of the United States Army and was commissioned in 1913 on 12 June that year, ranked 75th in a graduating class of 93.

Upon being commissioned, Patch's first assignment was with the 18th Infantry Regiment, then based in Texas City, Texas. He later saw action in the Pancho Villa Expedition into Mexico in 1916, and was later promoted to first lieutenant. In November that year he married Julia A. Littell, the daughter of an army general, whom Patch had met while he was a cadet at West Point.

In June 1917, two months after the American entry into World War I, Patch was promoted to the rank of captain and was, along with his brother Dorst, sent overseas with his regiment, which became part of the 1st Division, to join the American Expeditionary Forces (AEF) on the Western Front where he remained until November. (Note: Joseph Dorst Patch attained the rank of major general as commander of the 80th Infantry Division during World War II.)

He then attended the British Army's Machine Gun School in England and commanded the 3rd Machine Gun Battalion of the 1st Division until April 1918, when he then went on to direct the U.S. Army's Machine Gun School until October. Towards the end of 1918, returning to the 18th Infantry, he fought in the Second Battle of the Marne, the Battle of Saint-Mihiel and the Meuse–Argonne offensive, the largest battle in the history of the United States Army.

His leadership came to the attention of Colonel George C. Marshall, then a member of General John J. Pershing's staff. The war came to an end on 11 November 1918, at 11:00 am, by which time Patch was a lieutenant colonel, having been promoted to the rank a month before, and major the previous January. In February 1919, he reverted to the rank of captain and was a staff officer at AEF Headquarters.

== Between the wars ==
After briefly serving on occupation duties, Patch returned to the United States in May 1919 and, as a professional soldier, chose to remain in the army during what would later be known as the interwar period. After four years at Fort Benning, Georgia, and Washington, D.C., he spent the next few years as professor of military science and tactics at Staunton Military Academy, Virginia. He returned to this post twice in the interwar years, from 1925–28 and 1932–36. In 1922 he attended the Field Officer's Course at the U.S. Army Infantry School at Fort Benning. In 1924, he attended the U.S. Army Command and General Staff School at Fort Leavenworth, Kansas and graduated there with distinction a year later.

This was followed by service with the 3rd Battalion, 12th Infantry Regiment from 1929–31 at Fort Washington, Maryland. He then entered the U.S. Army War College in 1931 and graduated the following year. Promoted again to lieutenant colonel, he was later a member of the Infantry Board at Fort Benning, Georgia, from 1936–39, where he helped to develop the army's transformation from the old square division, with four infantry regiments, into the triangular division, with three.

In November 1940 he was promoted to colonel and assumed command of the 47th Infantry Regiment, then part of the 9th Infantry Division commanded by Major General Jacob L. Devers. General George C. Marshall, now the U.S. Army Chief of Staff and someone who had been impressed with Patch's leadership in France in 1918, was appointed Army Chief of Staff in 1939, just before World War II. He promoted Patch to the one-star general officer rank of brigadier general in August 1941, and sent him to Fort Bragg, North Carolina, to supervise the training of new soldiers there.

== World War II ==
=== Pacific Theater ===
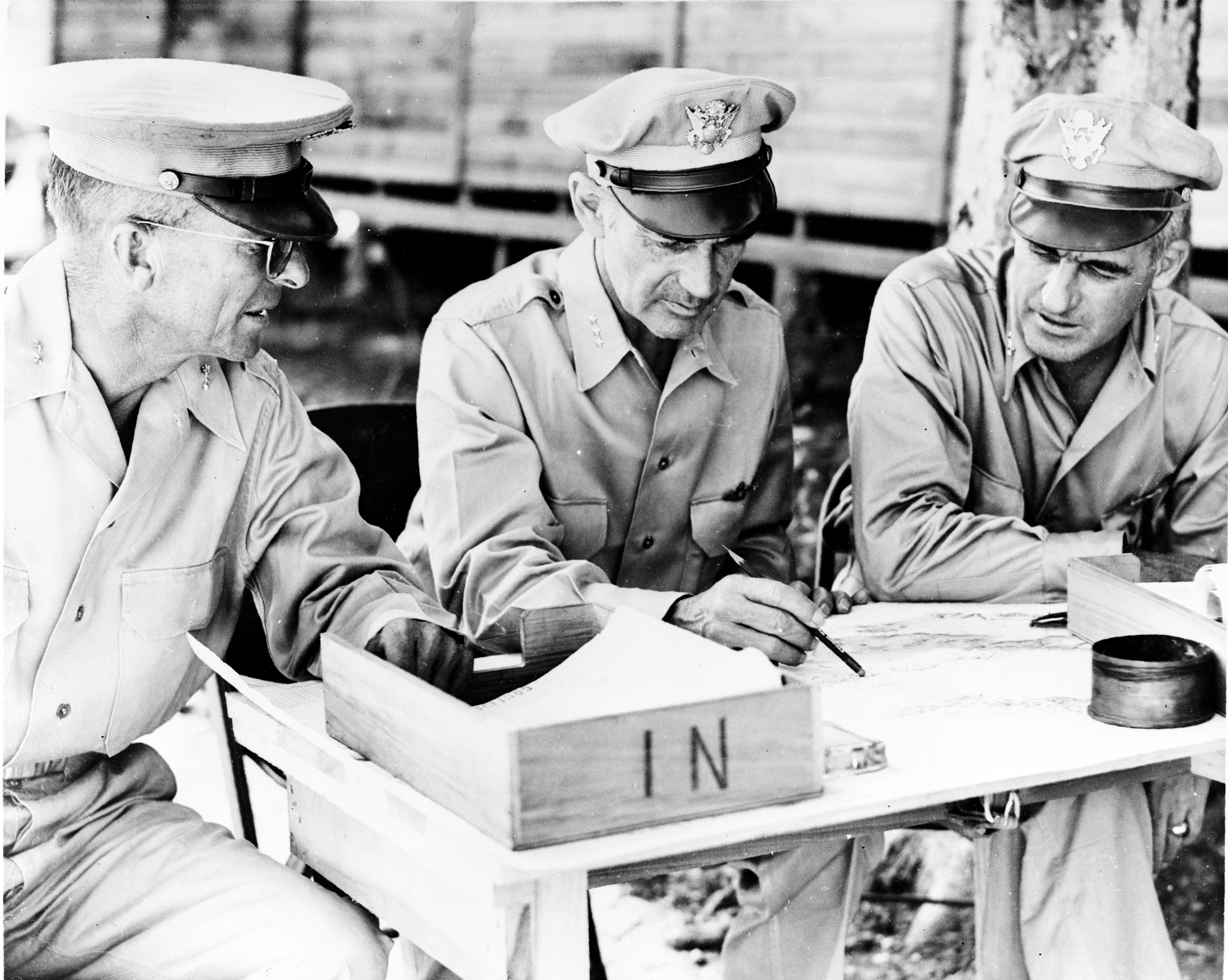
U.S. Army ground and air generals confer with their chief. From left to right: Major General Alexander Patch, Lieutenant General Millard Harmon, and Major General Nathan F. Twining, conferring over a map whilst serving in the South Pacific, February 1943

Patch was promoted to major general in November 1941 and was assigned to command Task Force 6814, a hastily assembled force of divisional size, composed of two Army National Guard infantry regiments. The following month the Japanese attacked Pearl Harbor, followed shortly after by the German declaration of war on the United States, officially bringing the United States into World War II. He was sent to the Pacific Theater of Operations in Noumea to organize the reinforcement and defense of New Caledonia, arriving there in March 1942. En route he was struck with pneumonia, recovering sufficiently to take command of a loose collection of units and form them into the Americal Division (a contraction of "American, New Caledonian Division").

The Americal Division first saw action in the Guadalcanal campaign in October 1942, when the 164th infantry arrived to aid in the defense of Guadalcanal and played a key role in the Battle of Henderson Field. The full division arrived by December 1942 to relieve the valiant but tired and malaria-ridden 1st Marine Division there. The Americal Division and the 1st Marine Division were both relieved by the 25th Infantry and 2nd Marine Divisions, respectively and, in early January 1943, Patch moved up to command of the XIV Corps, and was given charge of the entire offensive on Guadalcanal. Patch personally led troops under his command on a dangerous offensive in the Battle of Mount Austen, the Galloping Horse, and the Sea Horse to capture several fortified hills and ridges from the Japanese forces. Under Patch's leadership, by February 1943 the Japanese were driven from Guadalcanal.

=== The Oregon Maneuver ===
In the wake of Guadalcanal's conquest, the state of Patch's health, battered by his bout of pneumonia, tropical dysentery and malaria, forced George Marshall to recall him back to the U.S., after recovering from his illness, he took command in May 1943 of the IV Corps at Fort Lewis, Washington. That fall he commanded the 100,000 man strong Oregon Maneuver in central Oregon, the largest training exercise of World War II, designed to test American units prior to deployment in support of Allied combat operations in both the European and Pacific Theaters. In early 1944 he took the corps, then just a headquarters, overseas to Algiers, Algeria to the Mediterranean Theater of Operations (MTO). By mid-summer he would put his Oregon Maneuver experience to the test in Operation Dragoon, the amphibious assault of southern France that was pressed clear to the Alsace-Lorraine on Germany's southwest flank before year's end.

=== Mediterranean and European theaters ===
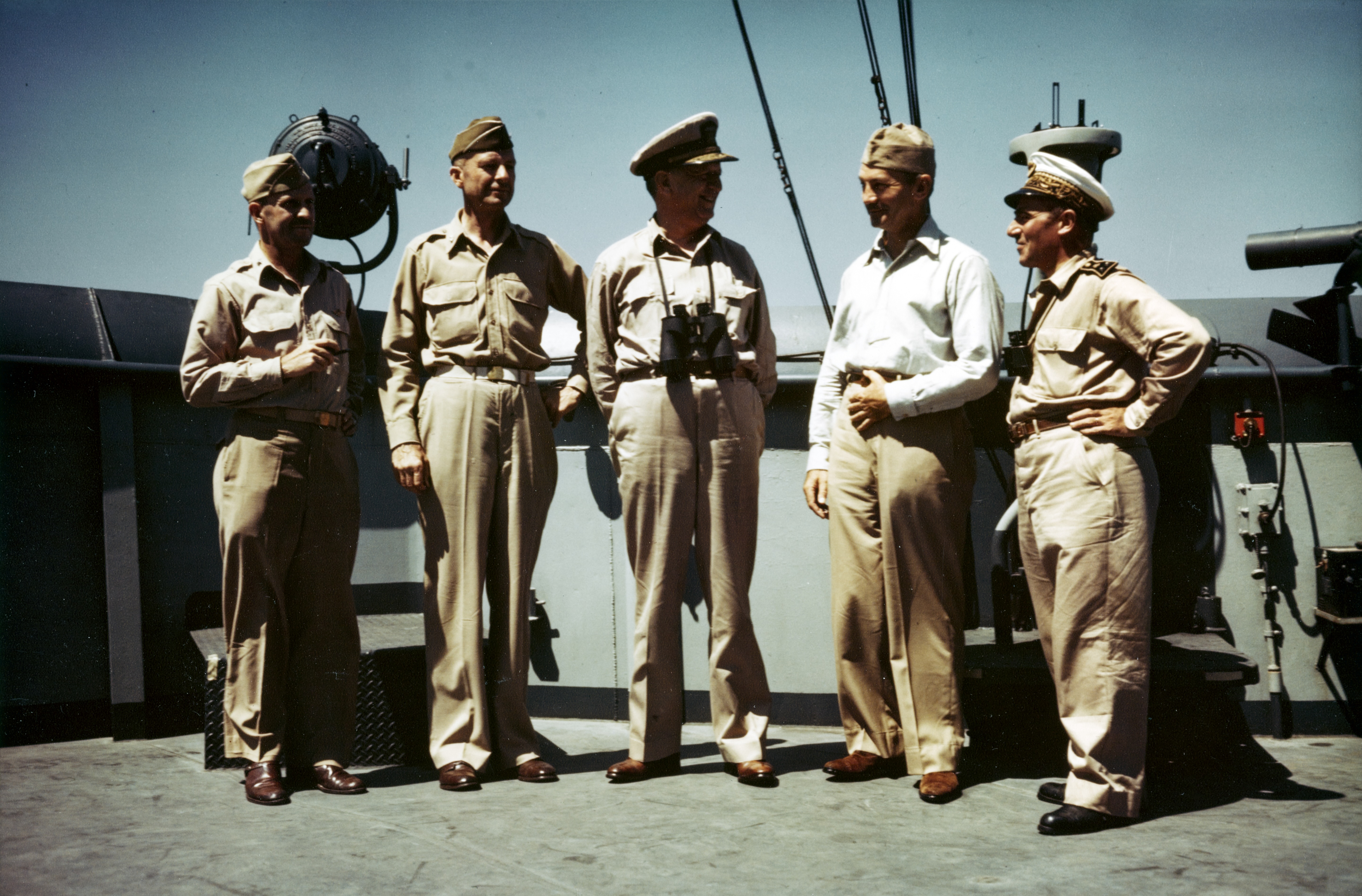
Senior officers aboard USS Catoctin (AGC-5), operation flagship, en route to the invasion area on 14 August 1944. Left to right: Brigadier General Gordon P. Saville, Air Commander; Lieutenant General Alexander Patch, Army Commander; Vice Admiral Kent Hewitt, Naval Commander; James Forrestal, Secretary of the Navy; Rear Admiral André Lemonnier, Chief of Staff of the French Navy

In March 1944, after handing over command of IV Corps to Major General Willis D. Crittenberger, a fellow 1913 West Point classmate, Patch took over command of the Seventh Army from Lieutenant General Mark W. Clark, who was then also commanding the Fifth Army during the fighting on the Italian Front. Under the leadership of George S. Patton, the Seventh Army had been the first American field army to be deployed in Europe during the war, landed as part of the Allied invasion of Sicily (codenamed Operation Husky) in July 1943 capturing Messina on 17 August and bringing the Sicilian campaign to an end. It was then reduced from a maximum strength of some six divisions and supporting units to a skeleton headquarters with relatively little to do, with Clark taking over from Patton in January 1944.

Under Patch's command, the Seventh Army was organized to participate in an upcoming amphibious operation in southern France, codenamed Operation Dragoon. For this operation the Seventh Army was composed of several veteran formations pulled out of the fighting in Italy. These were Major General Lucian Truscott's U.S. VI Corps and General Alphonse Juin's French Expeditionary Corps (CEF), along with numerous airborne units in support.

Under Patch, the Seventh Army invaded southern France in Operation Dragoon on 15 August 1944. Patch – promoted to the three-star rank of lieutenant general three days later – then led the Seventh Army in a fast offensive up the Rhône valley. On 9 September 1944, near Dijon, France, it met up with the U.S. Third Army, under Patton, which had driven east from Normandy. The Seventh Army came under the command of the 6th Army Group, commanded by Lieutenant General Jacob L. Devers. One of Patch's corps commanders, Major General Truscott, who commanded the VI Corps, which came under command of Patch's Seventh Army, wrote of him:

I came to regard him as a man of outstanding integrity, a courageous and competent leader, and an unselfish comrade-in-arms.

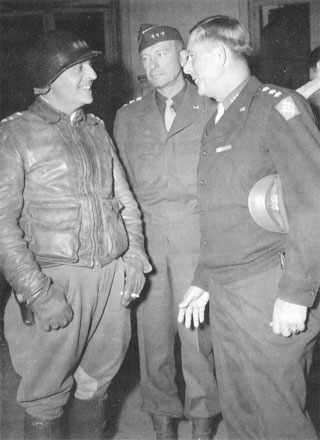
Three lieutenant generals in October 1944: Lucian Truscott, Alexander Patch, and Jacob L. Devers

Patch's Seventh Army distinguished itself in difficult winter conditions during the Vosges Mountains campaign, clearing strong and entrenched German forces from the west bank of the Rhine and stopping a German counteroffensive, Operation Nordwind, while reserve forces were being committed to the Battle of the Bulge. The campaign marked the only contested advance through the Vosges Mountains ever to succeed.Arthur R. Wilson became the Seventh Army's new chief of staff around this time.

In the spring of 1945, the Supreme Allied Commander on the Western Front, General Dwight D. Eisenhower, offered Patch a B-25 Mitchell and pilot for his personal use. Patch turned down the fleet twin-engined bomber because he wished to remain in touch with his subordinate commanders during fast-moving operations and preferred a smaller plane that could land on unimproved fields and pastures. Patch narrowly escaped injury or death on 18 April 1945, while flying from Kitzingen to Öhringen in Germany during the Battle of Nuremberg. His Stinson L-5 Sentinel liaison aircraft Sea Level was intercepted by a German Messerschmitt Bf 109 fighter, but the pilot, Technical Sergeant Robert Stretton, maneuvered the L-5 so skillfully that it escaped and landed safely at Öhringen. Stretton later received the Distinguished Flying Cross for the flight.

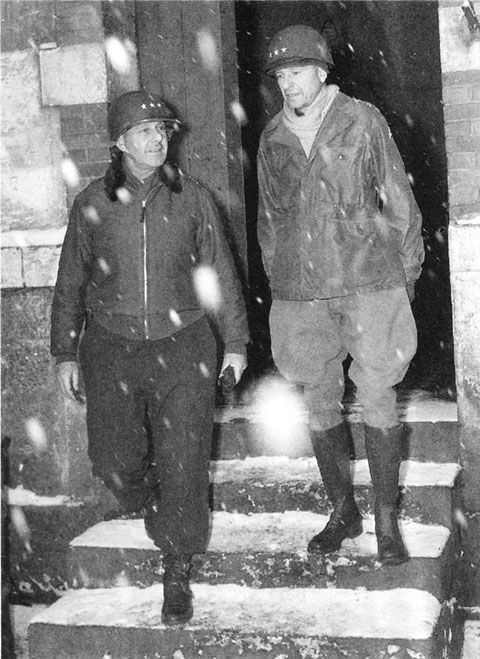
Lieutenant Generals Jacob L. Devers and Alexander Patch at Lunéville, France, January 1945

Patch stayed in command of the Seventh Army through the end of the war in Europe in May 1945, leading the Seventh Army in Operation Undertone through the Siegfried Line, over the Rhine, and then the Western Allied invasion of Germany into southern Germany. By war's end forward elements sprawled as far afield as Austria and northern Italy.

General Eisenhower discusses the war situation with some of his senior commanders at a forward command post, November 1944. From left to right: Lieutenant General Alexander Patch, Major General Edward H. Brooks, Lieutenant General Jacob L. Devers, General Eisenhower, and Lieutenant General Omar Bradley.

In August 1945, Patch returned to the United States to take command of the Fourth Army headquartered at Fort Sam Houston, Texas, but bound for the expected invasion of Japan.

Patch was hospitalized with pneumonia in November and died a week later.

== Personal life ==
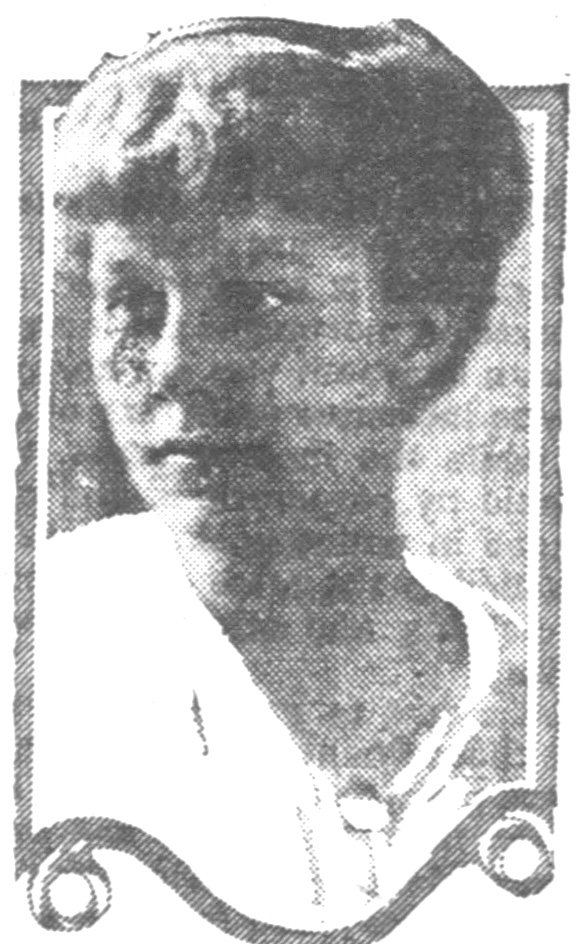
Wife Julia Littell in 1915

On 20 November 1915, he married Julia Adrianne Littell (1893–1988), daughter of Brigadier General Isaac William Littell. They had two children. Patch suffered a personal tragedy when their 24-year-old son, Captain Alexander M. Patch III, was killed in action on 22 October 1944 while leading C Company of the 315th Infantry Regiment of the 79th Infantry Division in the Meurthe-et-Moselle department in north-eastern France. Captain Patch was a posthumous recipient of the Distinguished Service Cross, the Silver Star and Purple Heart. He is interred in the Epinal American Cemetery and Memorial, Lorraine, France.

Patch died of pneumonia on 21 November 1945, two days short of his 56th birthday, at Brooke General Hospital at Fort Sam Houston, Texas. He is buried in New York state at West Point Cemetery on the grounds of the academy.

== Legacy ==
Kurmärker Kaserne, in Stuttgart-Vaihingen, West Germany, was renamed Patch Barracks in his honor on 4 July 1952. Patch Barracks is the home of Headquarters, United States European Command (HQ USEUCOM), the supreme American military command in Europe. Patch Barracks also has an elementary school named after him, as well as the former high school (1979–2015). The former kindergarten at Ft. Benning, Georgia was named Patch. The U.S. Navy transport USNS General Alexander M. Patch (T-AP-122) was also named for Patch. Boulevard Patch in southeastern France, from the main road to Pampelonne Plage in Ramatuelle in the Provence-Alpes-Côte d'Azur, is also named for him.

Patch was promoted posthumously to full general on 19 July 1954 under Pub. L. 83–508.

== Major Commands ==
- Task Force 6814 – November 1941 to 24 May 1942
- Americal Division – 24 May 1942 to 1 January 1943
- XIV Corps – January 1943 to April 1943
- IV Corps – May 1943 to 2 March 1944
- Seventh United States Army – 2 March 1944 to August 1945
- Fourth United States Army – August 1945 to 21 November 1945

== Awards and decorations ==
Ribbon bar with the list of General Alexander M. Patch's decorations:

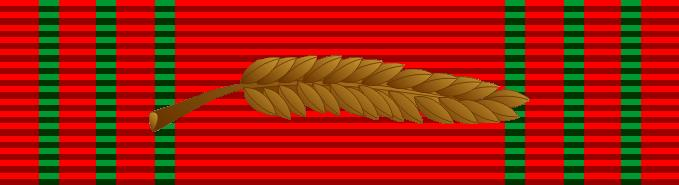

| 1st Row | Army Distinguished Service Medal with two Oak Leaf Clusters | Navy Distinguished Service Medal | Bronze Star Medal | Mexican Border Service Medal |
| 2nd Row | World War I Victory Medal with three battle stars | American Defense Service Medal | American Campaign Medal | Asiatic-Pacific Campaign Medal w/ two service stars |
| 3rd Row | European-African-Middle Eastern Campaign Medal w/ three service stars | World War II Victory Medal | Companion of the Order of the Bath (United Kingdom) | Commander of the Légion d'honneur (France) |
| 4th Row | Croix de Guerre with palm (France) | Order of Leopold II, Grand Cross (Belgium) | Croix de Guerre with palm (Belgium) | Order of Abdon Calderón (Ecuador) |

== Dates of rank ==
| Insignia | Rank | Component | Date |
|---|---|---|---|
| No insignia | Cadet | United States Military Academy | 1 March 1909 |
| No insignia in 1913 | Second lieutenant | Regular Army | 12 June 1913 |
| | First lieutenant | Regular Army | 1 July 1916 |
| | Captain | Regular Army | 15 May 1917 |
| | Major | National Army | 5 January 1918 |
| | Lieutenant colonel | National Army | 31 October 1918 |
| | Captain | Regular Army | 15 March 1920 |
| | Major | Regular Army | 1 July 1920 |
| | Lieutenant colonel | Regular Army | 1 August 1935 |
| | Colonel | Army of the United States | 26 June 1941 |
| | Brigadier general | Army of the United States | 4 August 1941 |
| | Major general | Army of the United States | 10 March 1942 |
| | Colonel | Regular Army | 1 July 1942 |
| | Lieutenant general | Army of the United States | 7 August 1944 |
| | General | Posthumous | 19 July 1954 |

== Bibliography ==
- English, John A. (2009). Patton's Peers: The Forgotten Allied Field Army Commanders of the Western Front, 1944−45. Stackpole Books. ISBN 978-0-8117-0501-1.
- English, John A. (2011). Surrender Invites Death: Fighting the Waffen SS in Normandy. Mechanicsburg, Penn.: Stackpole Books. ISBN 9780811707633. OCLC 782899143.
- Pfannes, Charles; Victor Salamone. The Great Commanders of World War II. Vol. III: The Americans.
- Weirather, Larry. "Saving General Patch". Aviation History, May 2012, pp. 18–19.
- Taaffe, Stephen R. (2013). Marshall and His Generals: U.S. Army Commanders in World War II. Lawrence, Kansas: University Press of Kansas. ISBN 978-0-7006-1942-9. OCLC 840162019.
- Wyant, William K. (1991). Sandy Patch: A Biography of Lt. Gen. Alexander M. Patch. Praeger. ISBN 0-275-93454-3.

Military offices
| Preceded by Newly activated organization | Commanding General Americal Division; May–December 1942 | Succeeded by Edmund Sebree |
| Preceded by Newly activated organization | Commanding General XIV Corps; 1942–1943 | Succeeded by Oscar Griswold |
| Preceded by Newly activated organization | Commanding General IV Corps; 1943–1944 | Succeeded by Willis D. Crittenberger |
| Preceded by Mark W. Clark | Commanding General Seventh Army; 1944–1945 | Succeeded by Wade H. Haislip |
| Preceded by John P. Lucas | Commanding General Fourth Army; August–November 1945 | Succeeded by Jonathan M. Wainwright |
