= Roscoe B. Woodruff =

United States Army general (1891–1975)

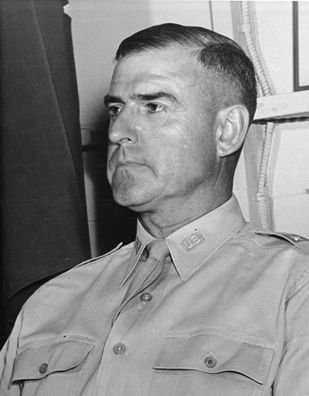
- Born: February 9, 1891; Oskaloosa, Iowa, United States
- Died: July 24, 1975 (aged 84); San Antonio, Texas, United States
- Military career
- Allegiance: United States
- Branch: United States Army
- Service years: 1915–1953
- Rank: Major General
- Nicknames: "Woody", "Spike"
- Service number: O-3819
- Unit: Infantry Branch
- Commands: XV Corps; First Army; I Corps; 24th Infantry Division; 84th Infantry Division; XIX Corps; VII Corps; 77th Infantry Division; 23rd Infantry Regiment; 2nd Battalion, 23rd Infantry Regiment
- Conflicts: Border War; World War I; Western Front; World War II; Philippine campaign; Battle of Leyte; Battle of Mindoro; Battle of Mindanao; Occupation of Japan
- Awards: Army Distinguished Service Medal (2); Silver Star (3); Bronze Star Medal; Purple Heart; Air Medal (2); Commendation Ribbon

Major General Roscoe Barnett Woodruff (February 9, 1891 – July 24, 1975) was a career United States Army officer who fought in both World War I and World War II and served for 38 years. During World War II he commanded divisions and corps in Europe and the Pacific.

A 1915 graduate of United States Military Academy (USMA) at West Point, New York, he was part of "the class the stars fell on"; Dwight D. Eisenhower and Omar Bradley were classmates. During World War I he served on the Mexican border and the Western Front with the 2nd Division. After the war he served in the Panama Canal Zone and attended the United States Army Command and General Staff College and the United States Army War College.

During World War II, he commanded the 77th Infantry Division in the United States and the VII Corps and XIX Corps in England. He then went to the Southwest Pacific Area, where he commanded the 24th Infantry Division in the Battle of Mindoro and the Battle of Mindanao. After the fighting ended, he commanded the I Corps in the Allied occupation of Japan and the First Army and XV Corps in the United States.

== Early life ==
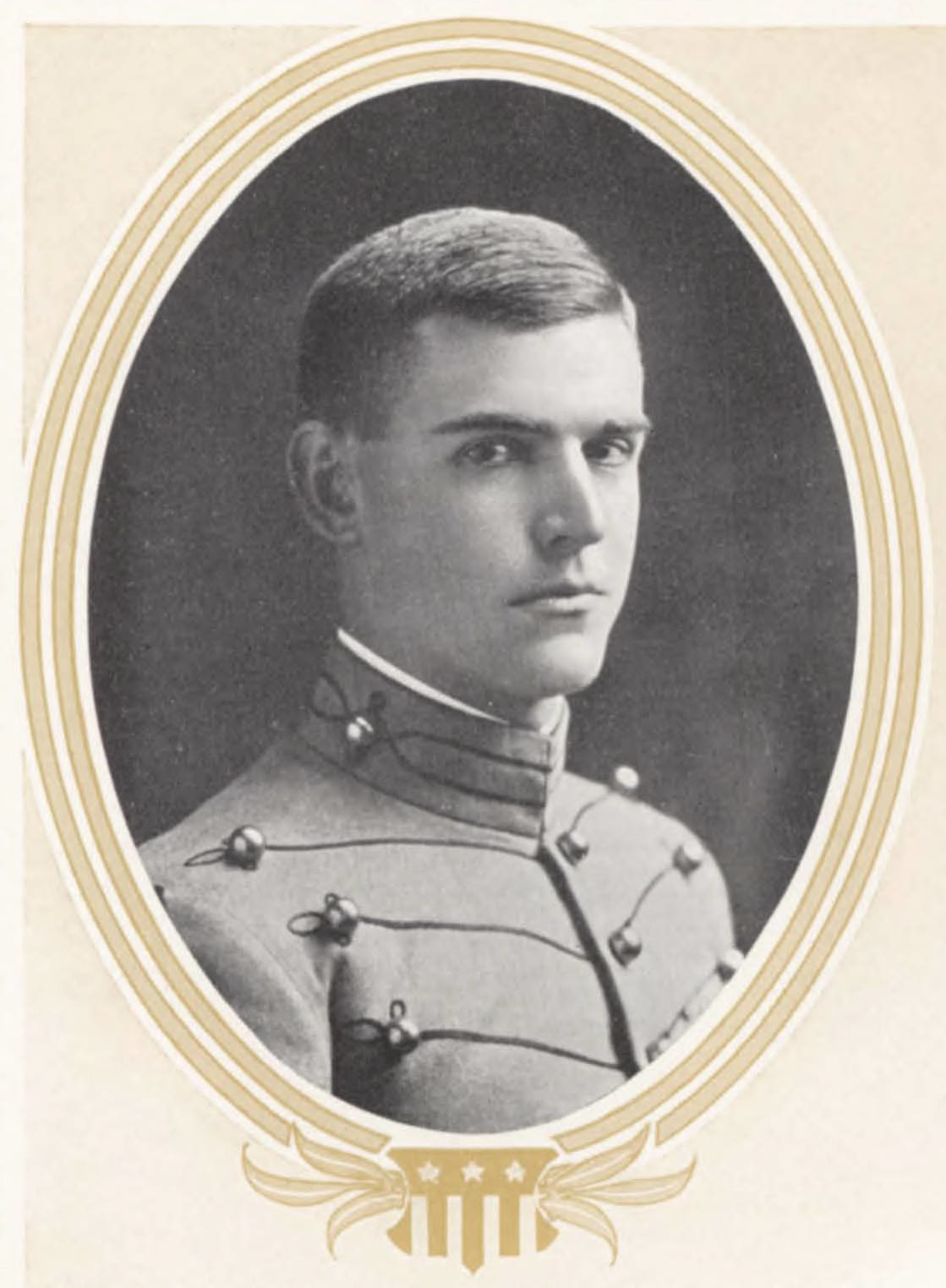
At West Point in 1915

Roscoe Barnett Woodruff was born on February 9, 1891, in Oskaloosa, Iowa, the son of Calvin Woodruff, an army officer. and his wife Rhoda née Barnett. After attending public schools and the Iowa State University, he entered the United States Military Academy (USMA) at West Point, New York, on June 14, 1911. He set a new record for the hammer throw, and, as part of the 1913 Army Cadets football team, he kicked the winning field goal in the Colgate-Army football game of 1913, earning an "A" in both football and the hammer throw. He was the First Captain of the Corps of Cadets.

Woodruff graduated from the USMA on June 12, 1915, as part of the West Point class of 1915, often referred to as "the class the stars fell on", ranked 56th in his class. Of the 164 graduates that year, 59 (36%) later attained the rank of brigadier general or higher, more than any other class in the history of the academy. The classmates he graduated with included Dwight D. Eisenhower, Omar Bradley, James Van Fleet and Joseph T. McNarney, along with John W. Leonard, Joseph M. Swing, Henry Aurand, Stafford LeRoy Irwin, Charles W. Ryder and Leland Hobbs. Woodruff was commissioned as a second lieutenant in the Infantry Branch of the United States Army.

== World War I ==
After graduation, Woodruff served at Laredo, Texas, on the Mexican border with the 9th Infantry. At the time troops were stationed on the border due to the threat from Pancho Villa. Woodruff was promoted to first lieutenant on July 1, 1916. While serving on the Mexican Border, Woodruff met Alice Wallace Gray, the daughter of Colonel Alonzo Gray, an 1887 West Point graduate and an officer with the 14th Cavalry. They were married at Fort McIntosh, Texas, on May 17, 1917. They had two children: Roscoe B. Woodruff Jr., who graduated from the USMA with the class of 1941, and Dorothy Woodruff Daniels.

After the American entry into World War I, he was promoted to captain on May 15, 1917. He was transferred to the newly-formed 48th Infantry on July 1 but returned to the 9th Infantry on August 1. He was became a company commander in command of Company H, 2nd Battalion, 9th Infantry Regiment, which was part of the 2nd Division. Woodruff was one of the first of his West Point classmates to see action in World War I, when the 2nd Division, embarked for the Western Front on September 17, 1917, as one of the first units of the American Expeditionary Forces (AEF).

Woodruff was a student officer at the Army General Staff College at Langres, France, from November 28, 1917, to February 14, 1918, and then was seconded to the British 8th Division in the Ypres sector. After briefly serving as an instructor with the 32nd Division, he returned to the United States in May 1918.

Woodruff was assigned to United States Army War College in Washington, D.C., with the temporary rank of major from June 17, 1918. On July 5, 1918, he was assigned to the Military Intelligence Division of the War Department General Staff.

== Between the wars ==
During the interwar period Woodruff remained in the army. On June 5, 1919, he became a military intelligence officer in the Southern Department, based at Fort Sam Houston, Texas. He was the Assistant to Chief of Staff, Military Intelligence, at the Southern Department from January 21 to May 8, 1920, and then the Executive Officer in the office of Assistant Chief of Staff for Military Intelligence in the Southern Department until February 17, 1921. He reverted to his substantive rank of captain on May 20, 1920, but was promoted to the substantive rank of major on July 1, 1921.

On February 17, 1921, Woodruff proceeded overseas again, this time to the Panama Canal Zone, where he was the executive Officer of the Panama General Area Depot until June 16, 1921. He commanding a battalion of the 33rd Infantry until August 29, 1921, when he became the Assistant Chief of Staff, G-2, of the Panama Canal Department. He reverted to the rank of captain on November 4, 1922. He was Assistant to Assistant Chief of Staff, G-3, Panama Canal Department, from March 29, 1923, until March 3, 1924, before returning to the United States on April 9, 1924.

Woodruff commanded a rifle company of the 28th Infantry at Fort Ontario, New York, with the rank of major again from August 1, 1924. He then became the regiment's Machine Gun and Howitzer Officer. He attended the United States Army Command and General Staff College from August 20, 1926, to June 17, 1927, graduating as an honor graduate. He then served as an instructor there until August 17, 1931, when he left to attend the United States Army War College. On July 6, 1932, he returned to the USMA as an instructor in tactics. Although normally nicknamed "Woody", the cadets nicknamed him "Spike", as one of his duties was censoring the Pointer, the post newspaper. He was promoted to lieutenant colonel on July 1, 1936. On August 16, 1936, he was detailed to the War Department General Staff again, this time in the operations and tactics section.

== World War II ==
In July 1940, Woodruff assumed command of the 2nd Battalion, 23rd Infantry, the same outfit he had served with in World War I. After being promoted to the temporary rank of colonel on June 26, 1941, he then commanded the regiment, then stationed at Fort Sam Houston, Texas. On January 15, 1942, over a month after the Japanese attack on Pearl Harbor and the subsequent German declaration of war against the United States, which brought the country into World War II, he was promoted to the temporary rank of brigadier general.

Woodruff then became the assistant division commander (ADC) of the 77th Infantry Division, a unit of the Organized Reserves, which was reactivated on March 25, 1942, and composed almost entirely of conscripts (or "draftees"). On June 22, 1942, he was promoted again, this time to the temporary rank of major general, shortly after he took over command of the division on June 5, during its pre-deployment training in Fort Jackson, South Carolina. He was awarded the Bronze Star Medal.

On May 22, 1943, Woodruff relinquished command of the 77th Division to Major General Andrew D. Bruce, who was later to lead it in action where it served with distinction, and took command of the VII Corps, then stationed in England. This brought him into contact with two of his former West Point classmates. Dwight D. Eisenhower, now a four-star general and the Supreme Allied Commander in Europe, was the first, and had been appointed to his new role in December 1943. The second classmate, Lieutenant General Omar Bradley, was designated in October 1943 to command the First Army for the upcoming Allied invasion of Normandy, with Woodruff as one of his three corps commanders, along with Major General Leonard T. Gerow, commanding the V Corps, and Major General Willis D. Crittenberger, commanding the XIX Corps.

All three men were well known to Eisenhower and Bradley, both of whom had seen service in the Mediterranean Theater of Operations (MTO), but they were concerned about having three such senior commanders who all lacked experience in amphibious operations or recent experience of battle in this war. Gerow, who was very close friends with Eisenhower and a protégé of General George C. Marshall, the Chief of Staff of the United States Army, managed to retain his position, but Crittenberger and Woodruff were relieved and replaced by two experienced division commanders, Major Generals Charles H. Corlett and J. Lawton Collins respectively.

Woodruff was shuffled off to command of XIX Corps, Crittenberger's former command, for several weeks, before returning to the United States, and he handed over command to Corlett. He was awarded the Army Distinguished Service Medal. Upon his return to the United States, Woodruff was deemed to be, in the opinion of Lieutenant General Lesley J. McNair, the commander of Army Ground Forces, "tainted goods and as such was ineligible for another corps". As a result, he assumed command of the 84th Infantry Division, then in training at Camp Claiborne, Louisiana, from March to June 1944. Like the 77th Division two years earlier the 84th was composed largely of draftees.

Woodruff's chance at large-scale combat command finally came when he was sent to the Southwest Pacific Area to command Army Garrison Force 248 on Leyte. In November, the commander of the Sixth Army, Lieutenant General Walter Krueger, abruptly gave him command of the 24th Infantry Division in the place of the fired Major General Frederick A. Irving. His welcoming reception in the theater was celebrated at the paratroop headquarters, fueled with five gallons of torpedo alcohol, furnished by United States Navy patrol boat sailors, as the key ingredient for liquid refreshments.

Ironically, Woodruff proved adept at amphibious operations, making a series of twenty-five landings on Mindoro in January and February 1945. He led his command in the five month Battle of Mindanao to liberate that island from Japanese occupation. During the campaign he broke several ribs when he fell into a Japanese spider hole. Although in great pain and unable to sleep for two weeks, he concealed the injury for fear of being declared unfit and sent home again. He was awarded an oak leaf cluster to his Army DSM, which he had earned earlier in the war, the Silver Star with two oak leaf clusters, the Purple Heart and the Air Medal with an oak leaf cluster.

== Postwar ==
In November 1945, after World War II had come to an end due to the surrender of both the Germans and the Japanese, Woodruff commanded the I Corps, part of the Eighth United States Army, during the Allied occupation of Japan from April 3, 1946, to February 1, 1948. For this service he was awarded the Commendation Ribbon.

From February 1948 to March 1951, Woodruff was deputy commanding general of the First Army at Fort Jay, Governors Island, New York. He assumed the role of commanding general from February 1 to March 28, 1949, upon the retirement of General Courtney Hodges, who had commanded the First Army during World War II, and again from October 1 to October 31, 1950, after General Walter Bedell Smith was appointed the Director of the Central Intelligence Agency (CIA).

In 1951, Woodruff took command of XV Corps at Camp Polk (now Fort Johnson), Louisiana. He retired from the army, as a major general, on January 31, 1953 after 41 years of active duty.

== Later life ==
Woodruff and his wife, Alice Gray Woodruff retired to San Antonio, Texas. He died on July 24, 1975, aged 84. He was buried in the Fort Sam Houston National Cemetery.

== Dates of rank ==
Insignia	Rank	Component	Date	Reference
No insignia at the time	Second Lieutenant	Infantry	June 12, 1915	
	First Lieutenant	Infantry	July 1, 1916	
	Captain	Infantry	May 15, 1917	
	Major (temporary)	Infantry	June 17, 1918	
	Captain (reverted)	Infantry	May 20, 1920	
	Major	Infantry	July 1, 1920	
	Captain (reverted)	Infantry	November 4, 1922	
	Major	Infantry	August 1, 1924	
	Lieutenant Colonel	Infantry	July 1, 1936	
	Colonel	Army of the United States	June 26, 1941	
	Brigadier General	Army of the United States	January 15, 1942	
	Major General	Army of the United States	June 22, 1942	
	Colonel	Infantry	November 1, 1943	
	Brigadier General	Regular Army	September 9, 1944	
	Major General	Regular Army	January 24, 1948	

== Notes ==
Military offices
Preceded by Robert L. Eichelberger	Commanding General 77th Infantry Division; 1942–1943	Succeeded by Andrew D. Bruce
Preceded by Robert C. Richardson Jr.	Commanding General VII Corps; 1943–1944	Succeeded by J. Lawton Collins
Preceded by Willis D. Crittenberger	Commanding General XIX Corps; January – March 1944	Succeeded by Charles H. Corlett
Preceded by Robert B. McClure	Commanding General 84th Infantry Division; March – June 1944	Succeeded by Alexander R. Bolling
Preceded by Frederick A. Irving	Commanding General 24th Infantry Division; 1944–1945	Succeeded by Kenneth F. Cramer
Preceded by Innis P. Swift	Commanding General I Corps; 1945–1948	Succeeded by Joseph M. Swing
Preceded by Courtney Hodges	Commanding General First Army; February – March 1949	Succeeded by Walter Bedell Smith
Preceded by Walter Bedell Smith	Commanding General First Army; September – November 1950	Succeeded by Willis D. Crittenberger
