= William Woodruff (disambiguation) =

William Woodruff (1916–2008) was a world historian and author.

William Woodruff may also refer to:

- William E. Woodruff (politician) (1795–1885), American politician and publisher
- William E. Woodruff (soldier) (fl. 1855–1863), American lawyer and colonel in the Union Army during the American Civil War
- William Woodruff (Upper Canada politician) (1793–1860), Canadian merchant and politician
