= Union of Black Episcopalians =

Religions
- Christianity (The Episcopal Church)

Website
- Official website
- Formed 1968; 58 years ago

The Union of Black Episcopalians, formerly the Union of Black Clergy and Laity, is an organization of The Episcopal Church. It has EIN 31–1625076 as a 501(c)(3) Public Charity; in 2024, it reported total revenue of $229,099 and total assets of $165,005.

== History ==
The union was formed on February 8, 1968, by a group of African-American clergy who met in St. Philip's Episcopal Church to identify the church with the growing Black Power movement in their communities. The desire to articulate the problems of minority populations had been expressed by the Episcopal Society for Cultural and Racial Unity. However, it was felt that its agenda was influenced largely by white Episcopalians, and did not necessarily express the aspirations of African-Americans.

From 1974 to 1979, James E. P. Woodruff served as executive director.

The organization meets annually, and includes clergy and laity, men and women, without distinction. Chapters are organized by dioceses and are joined in regional groups to express local concerns more effectively. The goals of the union are to help the church eradicate racism within its structure, to indicate the importance of an authentic African-American voice in decisions of diocesan and national governing bodies, to develop liturgical styles in worship, and to encourage and participate in the political and religious concerns of the African American community.

== Membership ==
In 2018 there were 38 chapters within seven geographical regions. The Union of Black Episcopalians convenes an annual business meeting for all members.
