= Charles H. Corlett =

United States Army general

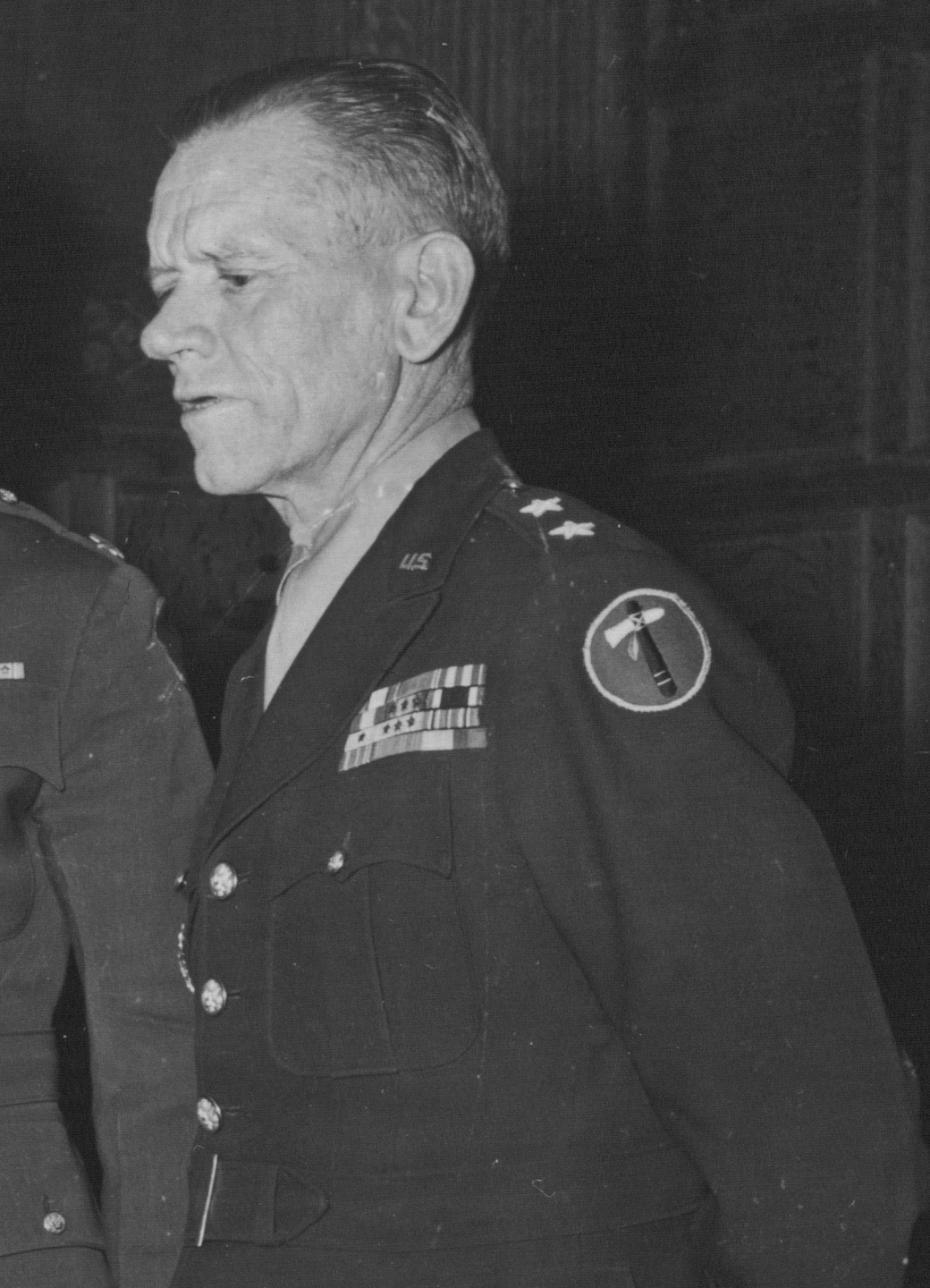
- Born: July 31, 1889; Burchard, Nebraska, United States
- Died: October 13, 1971 (aged 82); Española, New Mexico, United States
- Military career
- Allegiance: United States
- Branch: United States Army
- Service years: 1913–1946
- Rank: Major General
- Nickname: "Cowboy Pete"
- Service number: 0-3746
- Unit: Signal Corps
- Commands: XXXVI Corps; XIX Corps; 7th Infantry Division; 30th Infantry Regiment; 3rd Battalion, 9th Infantry Regiment
- Conflicts: World War I World War II
- Awards: Army Distinguished Service Medal (2); Navy Distinguished Service Medal; Silver Star; Legion of Merit

Major General Charles Harrison Corlett (July 31, 1889 – October 13, 1971), nicknamed "Cowboy Pete", was a senior United States Army officer who commanded troops in both the Pacific and European Theaters during World War II. He led the attack on Kiska in 1943 and commanded the 7th Infantry Division in the taking of Kwajalein in 1944. After D-Day he led the XIX Corps in pursuit of the retreating German Army through France, Belgium, Holland, and Germany.

== Early life and military career ==
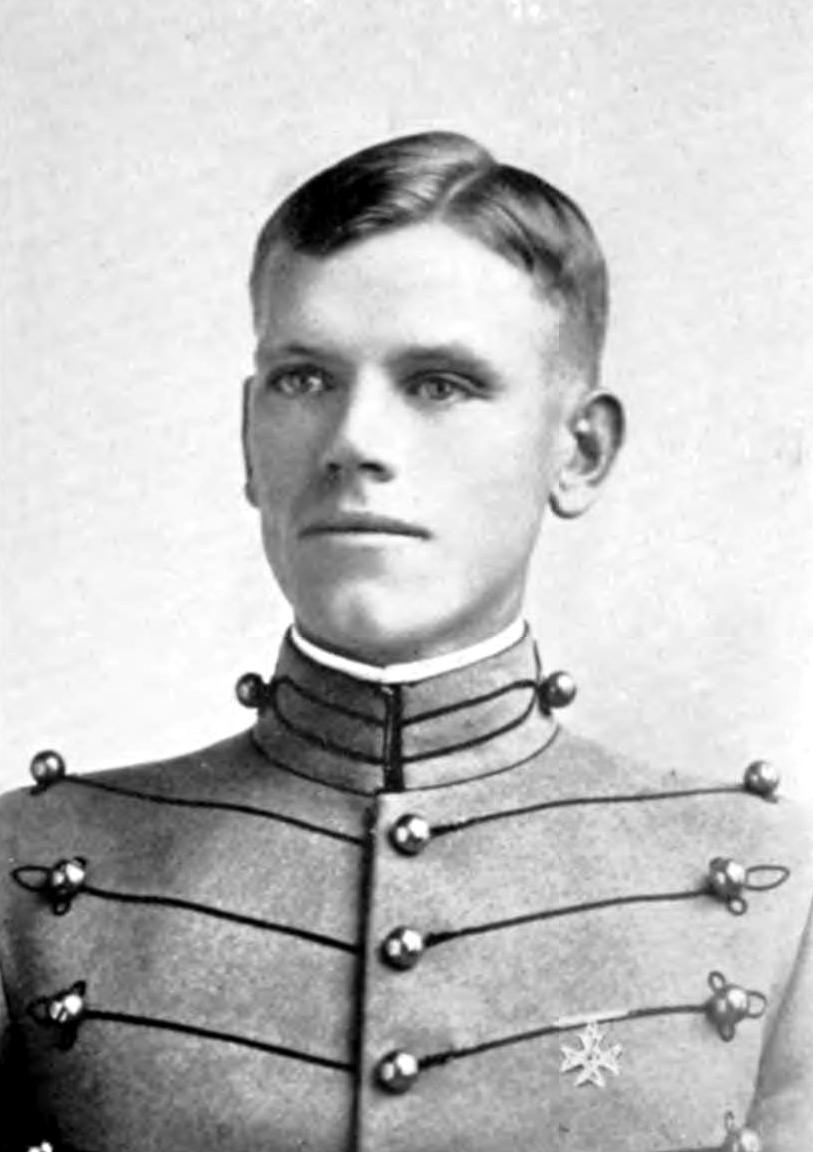
At West Point in 1913

Corlett was born in Burchard, Nebraska on July 31, 1889, but lived most of his early life in Monte Vista, Colorado, where his father farmed and practiced law. He graduated from public high school in Monte Vista and worked on cattle ranches until he was 19. The following year he was appointed to the United States Military Academy (USMA) at West Point, New York. As a cadet there, his knowledge of horses earned him the nickname of "Cowboy Pete". He graduated from the USMA on June 12, 1913, where he was commissioned as a second lieutenant into the Signal Corps of the United States Army. In April 1916, he moved with the 30th Infantry Regiment to Eagle Pass, Texas, where action in the Pancho Villa Expedition was anticipated but didn't materialize. He then was assigned to Radio Company A, a horse and mule outfit, and used one of the earliest radios in the U.S. Army. His brigade was renamed Signal Corps, and he witnessed the early development of military aviation, which was then a branch of the Signal Corps.

Due to the American entry into World War I in April 1917, Corlett worked in the early organization and expansion of the Signal Corps and was its first commanding officer and executive. He served on the Western Front where, as Director of Signal Corps Supplies for the American Expeditionary Force (AEF), he was injured by mustard gas while laying communication lines at the front. He crossed the Rhine into Germany with the first American troops at Coblenz. He was promoted to lieutenant colonel in 1918 at the very young age of 29. The war ended on November 11, 1918. For his service during the war he was awarded the Army Distinguished Service Medal, the citation for which reads:

The President of the United States of America, authorized by Act of Congress, July 9, 1918, takes pleasure in presenting the Army Distinguished Service Medal to Lieutenant Colonel (Signal Corps) Charles Harrison Corlett, United States Army, for exceptionally meritorious and distinguished services to the Government of the United States, in a duty of great responsibility during World War I. As Deputy to the Chief Signal Officer of the Line of Communications, Lieutenant Colonel Corlett displayed marked ability for organization and administration in the establishment of important Signal Corps undertakings, laying the foundation of the Signal corps work in the American Expeditionary Forces. Later, as Director of Supplies in the Office of the Chief Signal Corps Officer, he performed exacting duties with unusual ability, solving with sound judgment perplexing problems, enabling a steady flow of signal supplies to be maintained to the troops in the field.

== Between the wars ==
During the interwar period in the 1920s and 1930s, Corlett commanded various army detachments. He graduated from the U.S. Army Command and General Staff School at Fort Leavenworth, Kansas, in 1923 and the U.S. Army War College in Washington, D.C., in 1925. He was an instructor at the United States Army Coast Artillery School and at U.S. Army Command and General Staff School. He was a member of the General Staff of the War Department from 1934 to 1939. While he was there he was promoted to lieutenant colonel on February 1, 1936. He commanded regiments in Hawaii, California, Washington, and Alaska from 1939 to 1941. He was promoted again, now to the temporary rank of colonel, on June 26, 1941, but just three months later he was further promoted, now to the general officer rank of brigadier general, on September 30.

== World War II ==
During World War II, Corlett was awarded the Silver Star and the Army Distinguished Service Medal and the Navy Distinguished Service Medal, along with the Legion of Merit. The citation for his Army DSM reads:

The President of the United States of America, authorized by Act of Congress July 9, 1918, takes pleasure in presenting the Silver Star to Major General Charles Harrison Corlett (ASN: 0-3746), United States Army, for gallantry in action as Commanding General of the 7th Infantry Division on Kwajalein Island on 4 February 1944. When informed that certain elements of his command had been temporarily halted in their advance, General Corlett proceeded to the vicinity of the front lines in a tank. Although the area was under enemy observation and fire he dismounted and moved among his men to ascertain the situation personally. As a result of his prompt decision to push home the assault of his troops all enemy resistance on the island was quickly overcome. General Corlett's instant control of the situation, his courage, and fearlessness were an inspiration to his men, reflecting the highest credit of the military service.

The Navy DSM's citation reads:

The President of the United States of America takes pleasure in presenting the Navy Distinguished Service Medal to Major General Charles Harrison Corlett (ASN: 0-3746), United States Army, for exceptionally meritorious and distinguished service in a position of great responsibility to the Government of the United States as Commanding General of the 7th Infantry Division from 5 September 1942 to 21 February 1944, and as Commanding General of the Southern Landing Force in the assault on Kwajalein Atoll from 31 January to 5 February 1944. As Commanding General of the 7th Infantry Division, General Corlett effectively supervised and directed the training of that division for combat. Committed to the important task of directing the assault against Kwajalein Atoll, he displayed brilliant leadership, outstanding professional ability and exercised sound tactical judgment in commanding his troops. He personally directed the operation against the enemy position on Kwajalein Atoll and his indomitable courage was a constant inspiration to his men, who assaulted this enemy stronghold. This resulted in the capture of the island and the complete annihilation of all enemy forces thereon.

=== Kiska ===
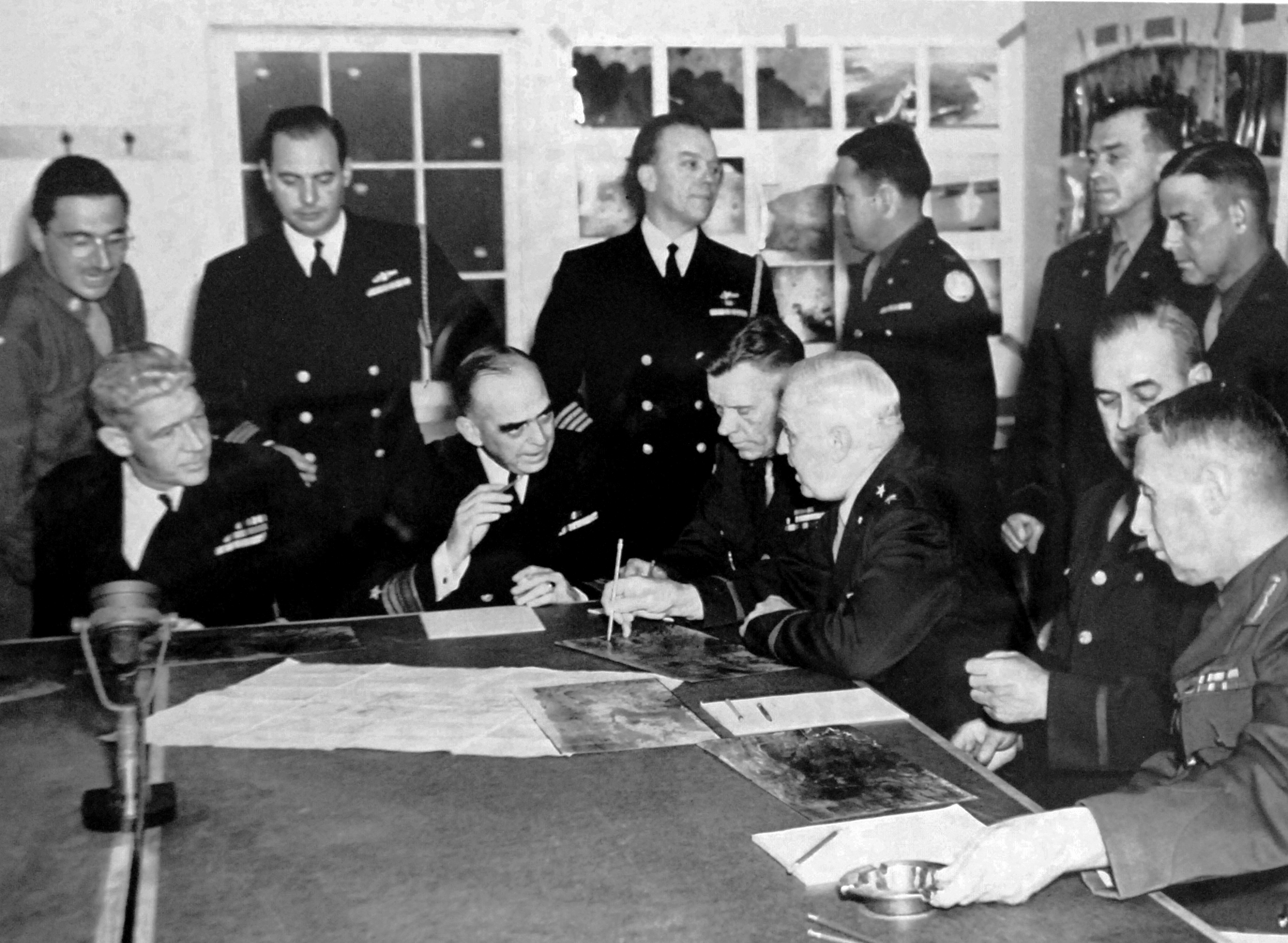
Corlett with other senior officers planning the Kiska expedition

Although World War II had begun in September 1939, the United States chose to remain neutral and did not enter the conflict until December 8, 1941, due to the Japanese surprise attack on Pearl Harbor the previous day. Corlett was promoted to the temporary rank of major general on September 6, 1942 and was placed in command of the Kiska Task Force that consisted of 35,000 soldiers, including the 7th Infantry Division, First Special Service Force, 87th Infantry Regiment of the 10th Mountain Division, 184th Infantry Regiment, and the 13th Canadian Infantry Brigade. The Task Force was to retrieve the island of Kiska, the first of the only two locations (along with Attu Island) in the United States occupied by enemy forces during World War II. Both islands were two of the westernmost islands in the Aleutian Chain, posing a threat to strategic targets and population centers across the United States West Coast. Kiska was a Japanese seaplane and submarine base with well-established infrastructure and an estimated force of 10,000.

Before the Kiska attack in August 1943, Attu was secured after several weeks of combat in extremely difficult weather. The American troops on Attu were ill-prepared for the cold, stormy environment of the Aleutians, but they were better prepared for the Kiska campaign with heavier clothing and training supplemented by 15–45 days of acclimatization and maneuvers in the Aleutians. Beginning in January, the United States Navy blockaded the island and bombed it almost every day in conjunction with the United States Army Air Forces. Aerial photographs of the area showed enemy vehicles as late as August 13.

The U.S. amphibious attack on Kiska began the night of August 15. The soldiers expected enemy fire, but they were greeted by only silence as they scrambled ashore in heavy, unrelenting fog. On August 16, the second half of the powerful invasion force came ashore on the northern part of Kiska, again to a deserted island. The Japanese had left under cover of night, fog, and storm two weeks earlier. At noon on August 17, Major General Corlett conceded that the enemy was really gone, leaving great stores of supplies. Nevertheless, Allied forces suffered 313 casualties including friendly fire, land and naval mines, and car accidents in foggy conditions. This phantom battle marked the end of the Japanese occupation of American soil and its only campaign in the Western Hemisphere.

=== Kwajalein ===
Corlett was then transferred to Fort Ord, California, to organize, train, and equip the 9th Amphibious Corps, including the 7th Infantry Division and other special troops who later distinguished themselves in many battles in the South Pacific. He received orders to take command of the 7th Infantry Division and report to Admiral Chester W. Nimitz at Pearl Harbor, where Nimitz informed him that he was to be in command of the army forces that would capture Kwajalein Island on the southern part of Kwajalein Atoll, a major Japanese naval-air base and part of the Marshall Islands, 2,350 miles southwest of Honolulu. Kwajalein, the world's largest atoll, was defended by 5,000 troops, who were ordered not to surrender.

After extensive amphibious training on Maui for 5 months and many days of aerial bombardment of the island, the 7th Division attacked and fought in Operation Flintlock on January 31–February 7, 1944, a campaign resulting in the capture of 27 islets, 12 of which were rigorously defended to the death by the enemy.

Kwajalein has been called by some military observers the most nearly perfect of all U.S. amphibious operations because of the flawless execution of a well-thought-out plan. Casualty results attest to this evaluation and were attributed to careful planning and preparation by the 7th Division: 177 U.S. soldiers killed, 4,398 Japanese killed, and 174 enemy soldiers taken prisoner.

=== Western Europe ===
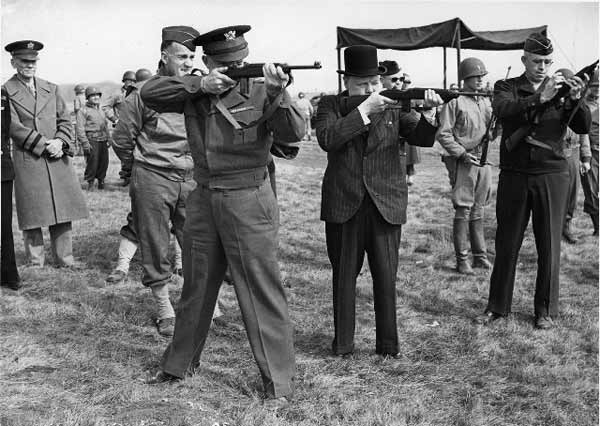
Major General Edward H. Brooks observing General Dwight D. Eisenhower, Winston Churchill and Lieutenant General Omar Bradley fire M1 carbines. Stood to the far left, with peaked cap, is Major General Charles H. Corlett.

In April 1944, Corlett was ordered to the European Theater of Operations (ETO). In London he reported to General Dwight D. Eisenhower, the Supreme Allied Commander in the theater, and was informed he was to become commander of the XIX Corps, part of the U.S. First Army under Lieutenant General Omar Bradley. The corps, initially consisting of the 2nd and 3rd Armored Divisions and the 29th and 30th Infantry Divisions, would battle across France, Belgium, the Netherlands, and Germany. He immediately began training the corps in Warminster, Wiltshire, England, for the anticipated amphibious assault on Northern France, scheduled for June 1944.

On the fourth day after D-Day (June 10), the XIX Corps landed in France at Omaha Beach, where the 29th Infantry Division, in its first battle, suffered very heavy casualties, near Colleville-su-Mer. In the next few weeks they took St. Lo after difficult hedge-row fighting and spearheaded the Operation Cobra breakthrough to Mortain and the Falaise Pocket, where they destroyed 100 German tanks and captured 3 German divisions. While dealing with thousands of prisoners of war (POWs) the corps occupied the towns of Évreux and Elbeuf and took Tessy-sur-Vire on August 1. They captured Percy on August 5. After stopping the last German offensive in Normandy and battling nearly 100,000 troops in the Argentan-Falaise Pocket, they crossed the river Seine on August 28.

Ordered to drive northwest as quickly as possible, the XIX Corps faced the bulk of the German Army in the West, which was retreating as fast as it could to prevent any further encirclement, but capable of counterattacking and defending in force.

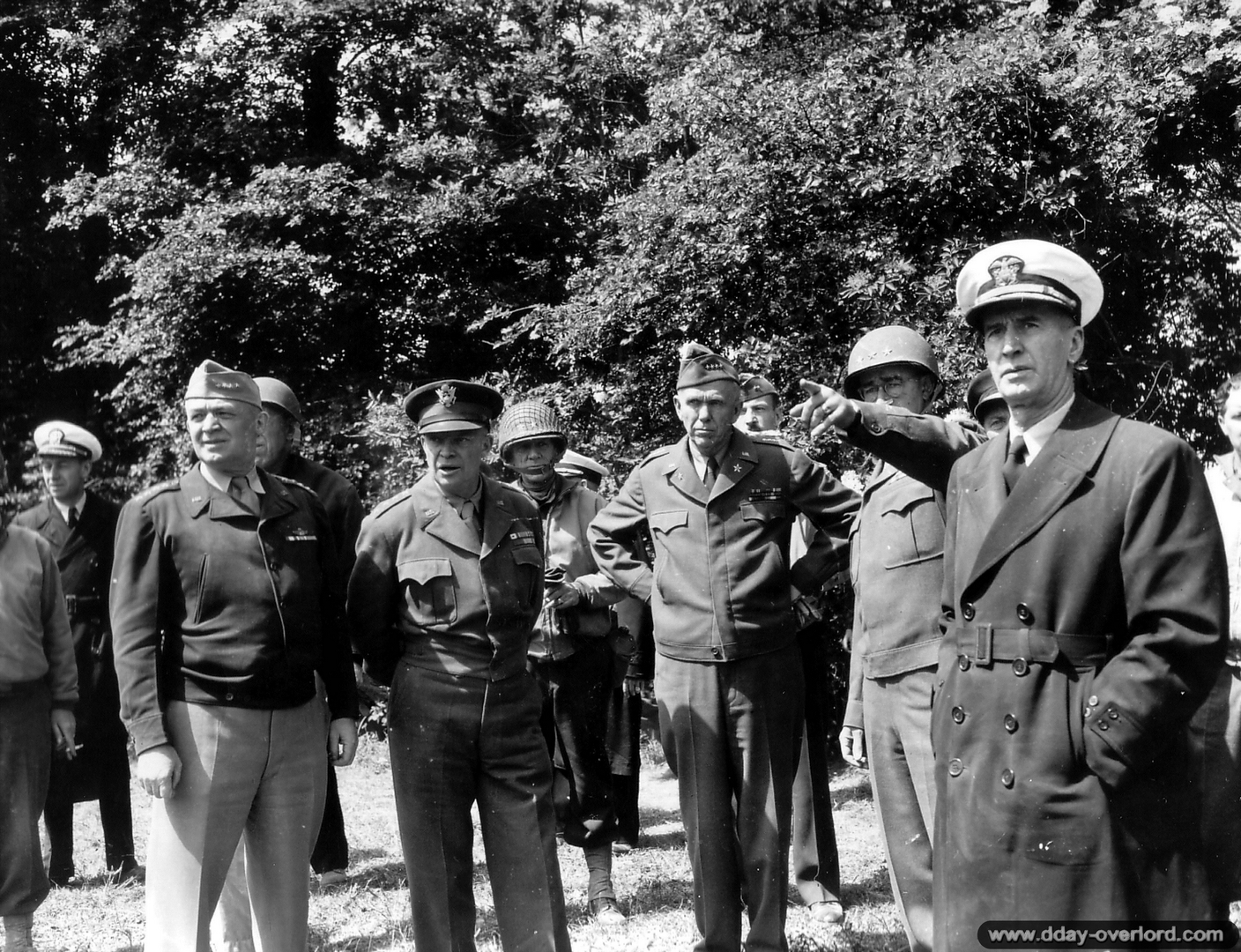
Senior American officers visit the gun emplacements on Point du Hoc, Normandy, June 12, 1944. Left to right: General Henry H. Arnold, General Dwight D. Eisenhower, Major General Charles H. Corlett, General George C. Marshall, Lieutenant General Omar Bradley and Admiral Ernest J. King.

Building bridges and shooting down 42 German planes, the XIX Corps reached Belgium in 2 days, crossing the river Somme on September 2, the first Allied soldiers to enter Belgium and the Netherlands. They took Tournai on September 2, followed by Fort Eben-Emael, Maastricht, and Sittard. On September 14, the corps crossed the Meuse River and entered Germany, establishing a bridgehead across the Albert Canal. The XIX Corps was struggling to close an escape route known as the Aachen Gap when, because of illness, Corlett was relieved of command of the corps on October 15, 1944, and assigned to the U.S. 12th Army Group in France. From D-Day to October 15, the XIX Corps captured 29,867 POWs, shot down 55 enemy airplanes, built 160 bridges, and crossed the Vire, Seine, Somme, Meuse, and Maas Rivers. During this same period, soldiers of the corps were awarded 26 Distinguished Service Crosses, 737 Silver Stars, and 3,390 Bronze Stars.

=== Planned invasion of the Japanese mainland ===
In November 1944, Corlett reported to Admiral Nimitz in Honolulu and took command of the XXXVI Corps in the planning of the northern attack on the Japanese mainland from the Kurile Islands in the projected Operation Downfall. In connection with that order and at the time of Victory over Japan Day (V-J Day), he was writing a training course in amphibious operations for divisions returning from Europe.

Major General Corlett retired from the army in 1946.

== Postwar ==
After his retirement from the Army, Corlett was appointed by the U.S. Secretary of Agriculture to organize and initiate the Commission for Eradication of Hoof and mouth disease in Mexico, requiring relocation to Mexico City until mid-1947. He returned to his sheep and cattle ranch in New Mexico, where the governor appointed him chairman of the New Mexico State Bureau of Revenue and later to the State Investment Council. He was also on the board of the School of American Research.

He died in Española, New Mexico, on October 13, 1971, at the age of 82.

Three years after his death, "Cowboy Pete: The autobiography of Major General Charles H. Corlett" - Paperback - 127 pages - January 1, 1974 - was published.

== Career summary ==
=== Assignments ===
- Company B, 30th Infantry, Fort St. Michael, Alaska
- Company A and Company I, Plattsburg Business Men's Training Camp
- Radio Company A, 30th Infantry, Eagle Pass, Texas
- Signal Corps, Fort Monmouth, New Jersey
- Signal Corps Supplies, American Expeditionary Forces, France
- 48th Infantry, Fort Harvey J. Jones, Arizona
- 3rd Battalion, 9th Infantry, San Antonio, Texas
- Civilian Conservation Corps, Eugene, Oregon
- 30th Infantry, Presidio, San Francisco, California
- Special Forces, Fort Shafter and Schofield Barracks, Hawaii
- 9th Army Corps, Fort Lewis, Washington
- 4th Army Corps, Fort Ord, California
- 7th Division, Fort Greely, Alaska - 7 April 1943 to 25 February 1944
- 9th Amphibious Corps, Marshall Islands, South Pacific
- XIX Corps, European Theater, France, Belgium, The Netherlands, Germany - 10 March 1944 to 15 October 1944
- XXXVI Corps, U.S. Pacific Command - 10 November 1944 to 25 September 1945

=== Battles, wars ===
- Mexican Border Campaign
- World War I
  - Meuse-Argonne Offensive
- World War II
  - Kiska
  - Kwajalein Atoll
  - Falaise Pocket
  - Belgium

=== Military awards ===

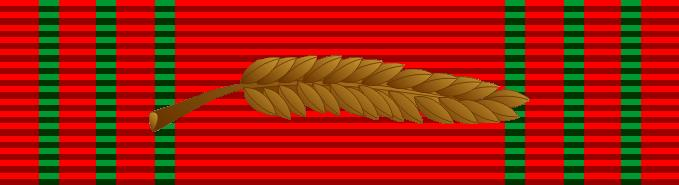

| 1st Row | Army Distinguished Service Medal with Oak Leaf Cluster | | Navy Distinguished Service Medal | |
| 2nd Row | Silver Star | Legion of Merit | Mexican Border Service Medal | World War I Victory Medal with three Battle Clasps |
| 3rd Row | Army of Occupation of Germany Medal | American Defense Service Medal with "Foreign Service" clasp | American Campaign Medal | Asiatic-Pacific Campaign Medal with three campaign stars |
| 4th Row | European-African-Middle Eastern Campaign Medal with two campaign stars | World War II Victory Medal | Officer; Legion of Honor (France) | Croix de guerre 1939–1945 with Palm (France) |
| 5th Row | Commander; Order of Leopold (Belgium) | Croix de guerre 1940–1945 with Palm (Belgium) | Grand Officer; Order of Orange-Nassau (the Netherlands) | Order of Abdon Calderón (Ecuador) |

=== Promotions ===
| Insignia | Rank | Component | Date |
|---|---|---|---|
| No insignia | Cadet | United States Military Academy | March 1, 1909 |
| No insignia in 1913 | Second lieutenant | Regular Army | June 12, 1913 |
| | First lieutenant | Regular Army | July 1, 1916 |
| | Captain | Regular Army | May 15, 1917 |
| | Major | Temporary | October 20, 1917 |
| | Lieutenant colonel | Temporary | October 22, 1918 |
| None | Resigned | | May 29, 1919 |
| | Captain | Regular Army | July 1, 1920 |
| | Major | Regular Army | September 11, 1923 |
| | Lieutenant colonel | Regular Army | February 1, 1936 |
| | Colonel | Army of the United States | June 26, 1941 |
| | Brigadier general | Army of the United States | September 30, 1941 |
| | Major general | Army of the United States | September 6, 1942 |
| | Colonel | Regular Army | March 1, 1943 |
| | Major General | Retired List | May 31, 1946 |

Military offices
| Preceded by Archibald Vincent Arnold | Commanding General 7th Infantry Division; 1943–1944 | Succeeded by Archibald Vincent Arnold |
| Preceded by Roscoe B. Woodruff | Commanding General XIX Corps; 1944 | Succeeded by Raymond S. McLain |
