= Richard Woodruff =

Upper Canada politician and justice of the peace

Richard Woodruff (1784–1872) was a merchant and political figure in Upper Canada.

Richard Woodruff was born in New England in 1784 and came to the Niagara Peninsula in Upper Canada, settling at St. Davids. He operated a mill there with his brother William. He served in the local militia during the War of 1812, becoming captain in 1835. In 1833, he was named justice of the peace in the Niagara District. Woodruff represented the 1st riding of Lincoln in the 13th Parliament of Upper Canada as a Reformer.
