= James E. P. Woodruff =

James Edward P. Woodruff (1937 - January 30, 2002) was an American civil rights activist and Episcopalian priest.

== Biography ==
James Edward P. Woodruff was born in Trinidad and emigrated to the United States when he was two years old. He went on to graduate from Fosdick-Masten Park High School. In 1957, he graduated from the State University of New York in Buffalo. During the summers in college, he worked as the boys' director at the Cold Springs Community Center YMCA. He earned his master's degree in divinity from Seabury-Western Theological Seminary in 1960. In June of that year, he was ordained at St. Paul's Cathedral in Buffalo.

Woodruff was the first chaplain and campus minister at the St. Anselm's Episcopal Center, starting in 1961. St. Anselm's hosted Black students from Fisk University and Tennessee A&I State University and was called "a meeting place for 'undesirables' by Mayor Beverly Briley. Woodruff and his wife, Nancy, taught Black history at "Liberation Schools" in Nashville, Tennessee. Some of these schools were held at St. Anselm's. Later, this program was recommended for closure by the Nashville police captain who believed that the schools taught "Negro youngsters hatred for whites." This perception led to the eventual closure of the liberation schools.

In 1967, Woodruff was sent to work on an "urban mission" in Philadelphia. During this project, he did not have a formal congregation and also worked as the assistant director of the Diocesan Department of Communications. Woodruff was tasked with community outreach to Black Christians. He gave speeches about Black and African history, emphasizing the need for a "tradition of black heroes." He also called for reparations for Black people. His preaching connected with people who felt left out of the political process and with those working towards civil rights. When he preached, he often wore a full robe and sometimes a dashiki. In Philadelphia, they called him "Friar Tuck." Bishop Franklin D. Turner called Woodruff "a sort of Malcolm X of the Episcopal Church."

After 1968, Woodruff became a member of the Union of Black Episcopalians. He was the leader of the Union in 1969 and served as executive director between 1974 and until 1979.

When Woodruff was ministering to prisoners in Graterford in 1972, he met conman, John Ackah Blay-Miezah. Blay-Miezah, who seemed to have connections to the government of Ghana, told Woodruff that he needed help restoring the country's wealth. Woodruff helped secure Blay-Miezah's release from prison. Later, in 1973, Woodruff would go into business with Blay-Miezah and visit him in London. Woodruff described his business work as developing trade relations with Ghana and "traveled extensively" during this time.

=== Writing ===
In 1972, Woodruff published a book of essays called Race War In America (OCLC 333409). He also contributed articles to Negro Digest.

=== Personal life ===
Woodruff had a daughter, two sons, and a stepson.

In 1991, Woodruff became a cab driver and worked for the Philly Cab Company. On November 30, 1995, he was the victim of an attempted robbery and was shot in the neck. After the shooting, he was paralyzed. He died of renal failure in Warrington on January 30, 2002.
