= John Woodruff (director) =

American actor and director

- Occupations: Actor; writer; director; producer
- Years active: 2003

John Woodruff is an American actor and director. He is best known for his short film, Lockbox and feature film, Animal Among Us.

== Filmography ==
Year	Title	Writer	Director	Producer	Note
2010	Reflections	✓	✓	✓	Short film
2013	Within	✓	✓	✓	Short film
2016	The Stalker Experiment	✗	✓	✗	TV series
2017	Lockbox	✓	✓	✓	Short film
2019	Animal Among Us	✗	✓	✓	Feature Film

As actor

- 2003 – Night Shift
- 2006 – Soulripperz
- 2008 – Frat House Massacre
- 2010 – Reflections
- 2010 – True Nature
- 2011 – Empty
- 2013 – Within
- 2014 – Murder Book
- 2016 – The Stalker Experiment
