= William Woodruff (Upper Canada politician) =

Upper Canada politician

William Woodruff (October 1, 1793 – June 1860) was a merchant and political figure in Upper Canada.

He was born in Middleton, Connecticut in 1793 and came to the Niagara Peninsula in Upper Canada with his family around 1795, settling at St. Davids in 1812. He built a mill and general store there, partnering in business with his brother Richard, who also served as a member of the legislative assembly. He served in the local militia during the War of 1812, becoming captain in 1827. Woodruff represented the 1st and 2nd ridings of Lincoln in the 10th Parliament of Upper Canada as a Reformer.
