= John I. Woodruff =

American football coach and politician

Biographical details
- Born: November 24, 1864; Selinsgrove, Pennsylvania, U.S.
- Died: May 8, 1962 (aged 97); St. Petersburg, Florida, U.S.
- Education: Susquehanna (1888); Bucknell University (1890)

Coaching career (HC unless noted)
- 1892–1893: Susquehanna

John I. Woodruff (November 24, 1864 – May 8, 1962) was an American football coach and member of the Pennsylvania House of Representatives. He served as the head football coach at Susquehanna University from 1892 to 1893.

Woodruff spent two term as a state representative from Snyder County, Pennsylvania from 1919 to 1922.
