= XIX Corps (United States) =

III Armored Corps XIX Corps
- XIX Corps Shoulder Sleeve Insignia
- Active: 7 July 1942–5 September 1945; 12 July 1950–1 April 1968
- Country: United States of America
- Branch: United States Army
- Role: Headquarters
- Size: Corps
- Anniversaries: 14 June 1944
- Engagements: World War II; Normandy; Northern France; Rhineland; Central Europe

Commanders
- Notable commanders: Willis D. Crittenberger; Charles H. Corlett; Raymond S. McLain; William C. Bullock

Insignia
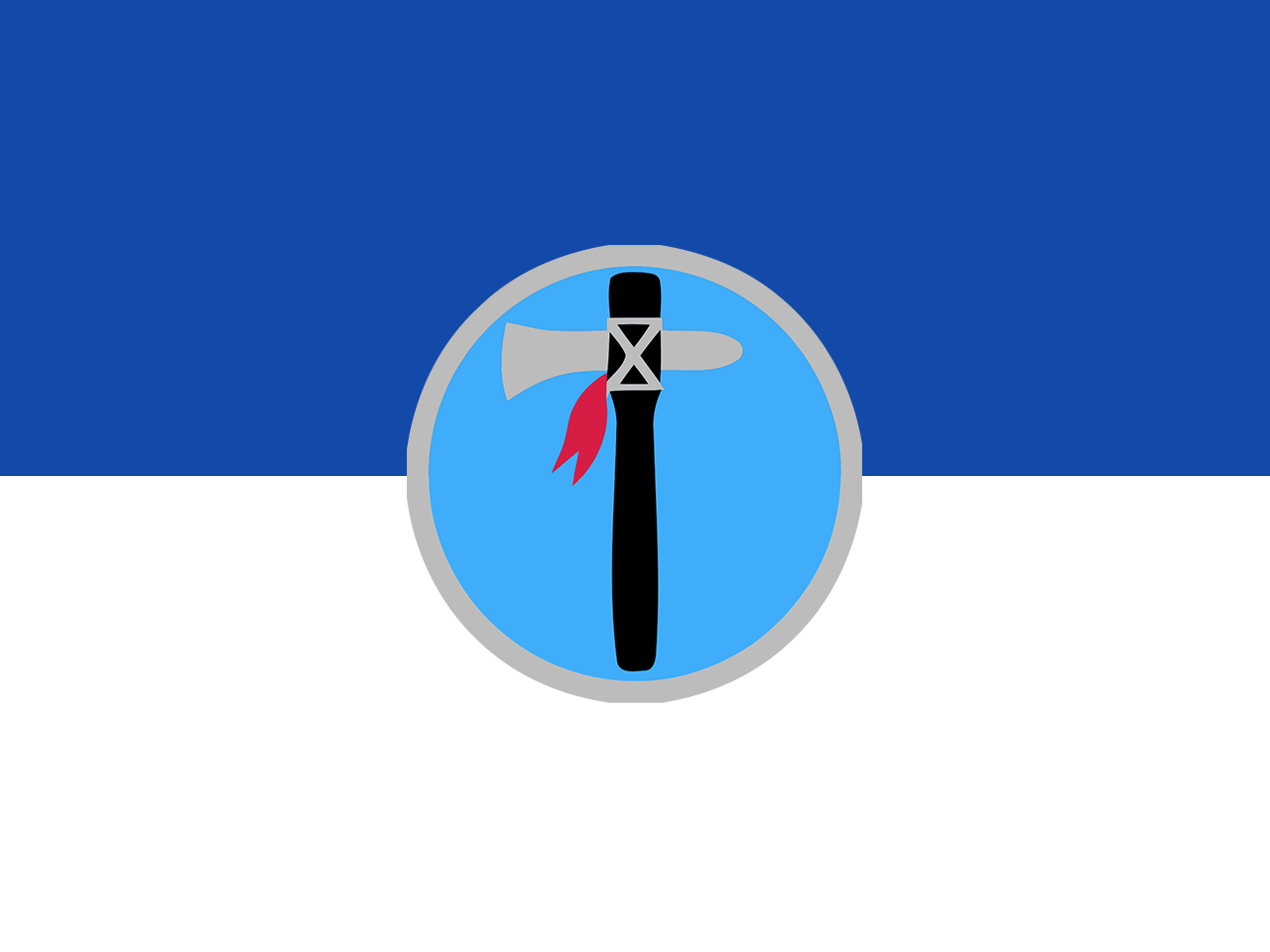
- XIX Corps Flag

XIX Corps was a corps-sized formation of the United States Army, that served during World War II and the Cold War. There have been three U.S. Army formations given the designation "XIX Corps," none of which are lineally related.

== History ==
=== XIX Corps (I) ===
The first iteration of the XIX Corps was authorized by the National Defense Act of 1920 and was to be composed of units of the Organized Reserve located primarily in the Ninth Corps Area. The corps headquarters and headquarters company were constituted on 29 July 1921 in the Regular Army, allotted to the Ninth Corps Area, and assigned to the Sixth Army. The corps headquarters was organized in February 1922 with Reserve personnel at San Francisco, California. The headquarters company was organized in February 1923 with Reserve personnel at San Francisco. The headquarters conducted staff training from 5–19 June 1927 with the headquarters, 30th Infantry Regiment, at the Presidio of San Francisco. The corps headquarters was withdrawn from the Regular Army on 1 October 1933 and demobilized.

=== XIX Corps (II) ===
The second iteration of the XIX Corps was constituted in the Organized Reserve on 1 October 1933, allotted to the Ninth Corps Area, and assigned to the Fourth Army. The headquarters was concurrently initiated at San Francisco, with Reserve personnel previously assigned to the demobilized XIX Corps (RAI). The designated mobilization station was the Presidio of San Francisco, where the corps headquarters would assume command and control of its subordinate corps troops, which would then be mobilizing throughout the Ninth Corps Area. It was redesignated on 1 January 1941 as Headquarters, XIX Army Corps. The XIX Corps was not activated prior to World War II and was located in San Francisco as of 7 December 1941 in an inactive reserve status.

=== III Armored Corps (XIX Corps) ===
The Headquarters, III Armored Corps was constituted in the Army of the United States on 7 July 1942, and activated at Camp Polk, Louisiana on 20 August 1942 under the command of Major General Willis D. Crittenberger during World War II. On October 10, 1943, the Headquarters, III Armored Corps was reorganized and re-designated as Headquarters and Headquarters Company, XIX Corps.

At the same time, Headquarters and Headquarters Battery, 141st Field Artillery Brigade (originally formed from elements of the 141st Field Artillery) was reorganized and redesignated 10 October 1943 as Headquarters and Headquarters Battery, XIX Corps Artillery. The corps fought as part of the First and Ninth Armies, fighting on the Western Front of World War II. On 1 March 1945, XIX Corps, under the orders of General Raymond S. McLain, was operating as part of Ninth Army under General William Hood Simpson, itself assigned to British Field Marshal Bernard Montgomery's 21st Army Group. The corps was made up of the 2nd Armored Division, and the 29th, 30th and 83rd Infantry Divisions.

The corps headquarters was disbanded on 5 September 1945 in France; HHB XIX Corps Artillery was inactivated in France on that same day.

Headquarters XIX Corps was reconstituted on 12 July 1950 in the Army of the United States. It was allotted to the Regular Army in October 1959 and activated on 1 November that year at Fort Chaffee, Arkansas, where it controlled reserve units in its immediate region. It was inactivated on 1 April 1968 at Fort Chaffee.

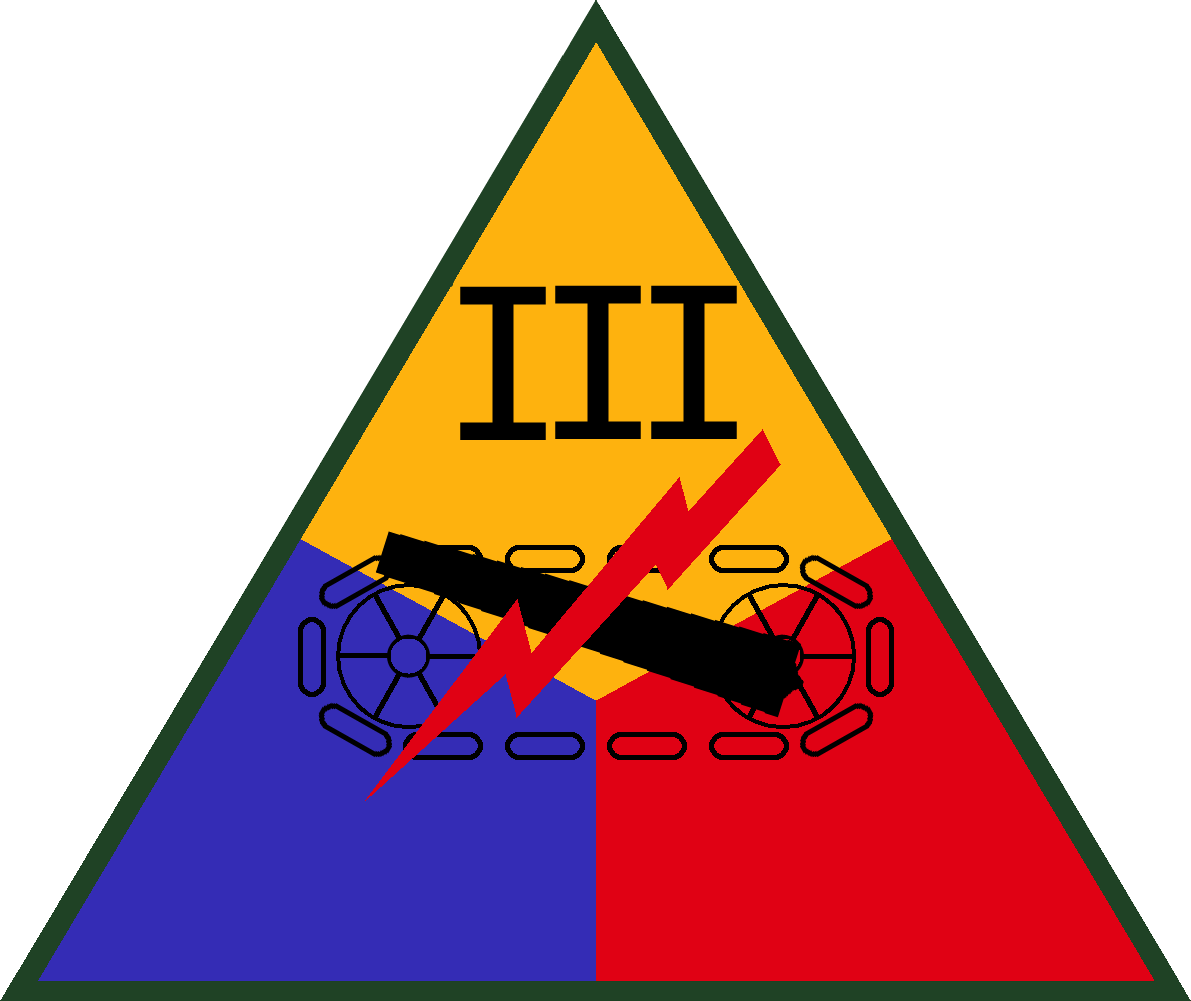
III Armored Corps Shoulder Sleeve Insignia
August 20, 1942 - October 10, 1943

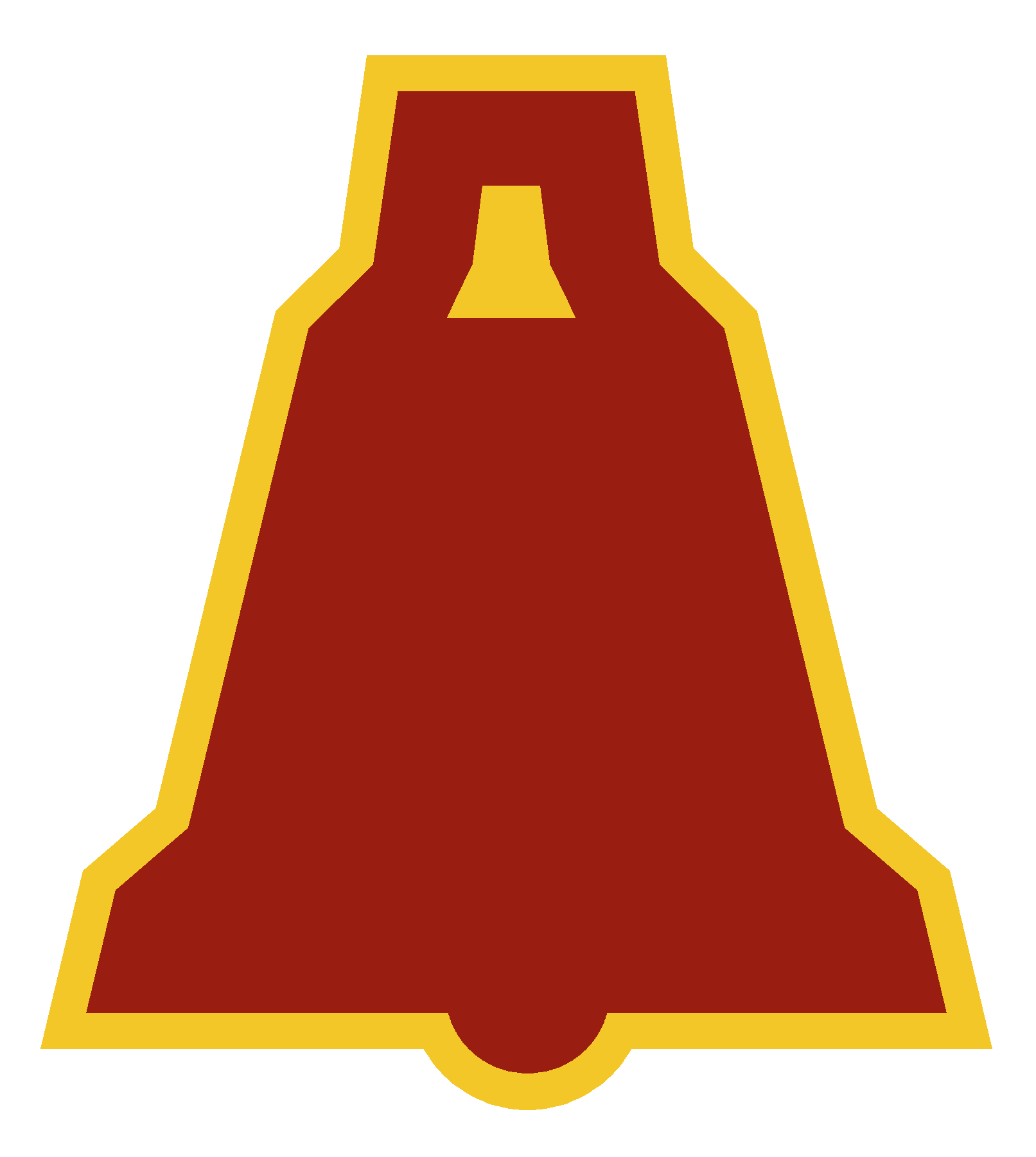
XIX Corps Shoulder Sleeve Insignia
October 2, 1935 - October 1, 1943
Organized Reserve Unit

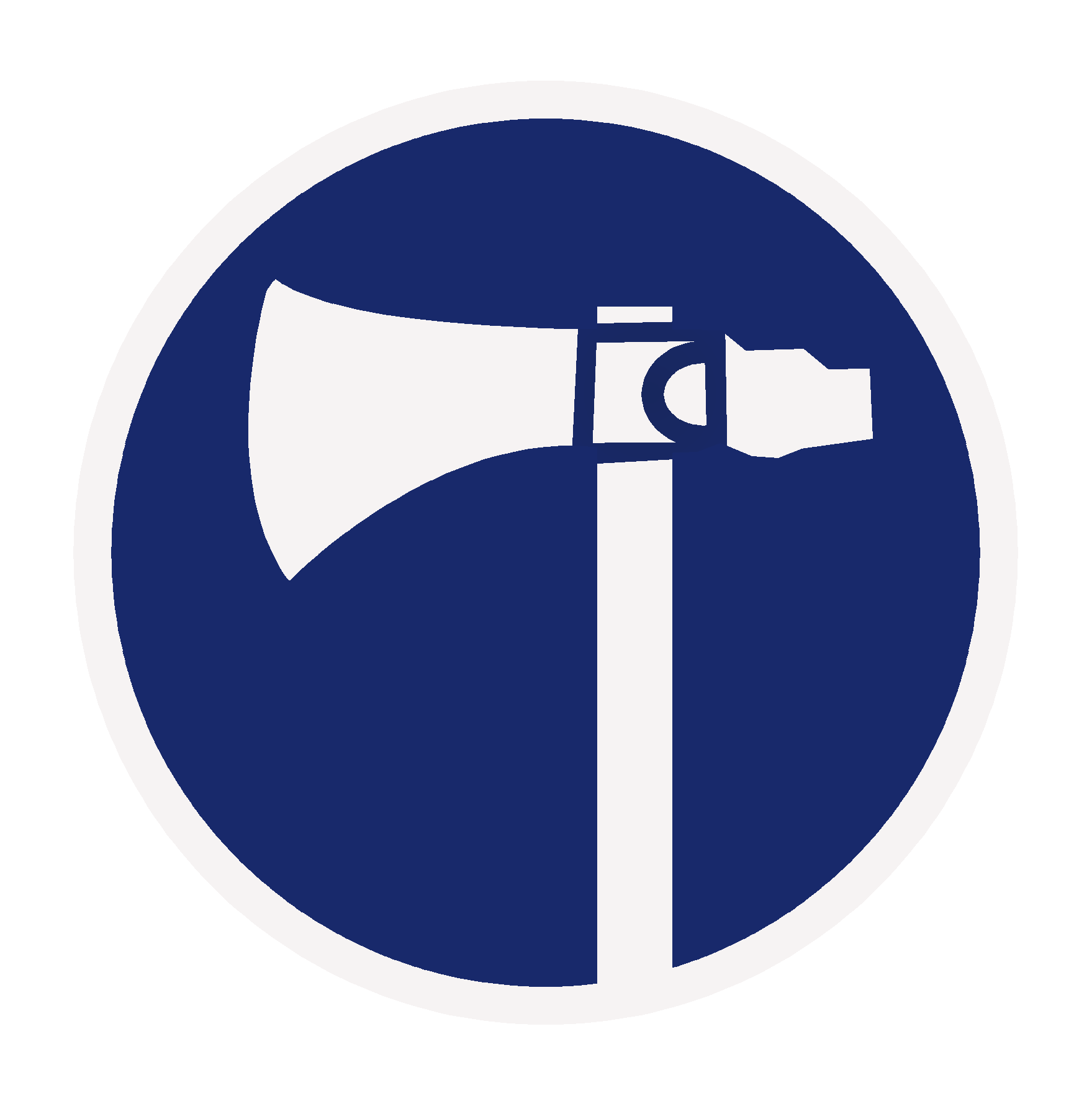
XIX Corps Shoulder Sleeve Insignia
October 1943 - March 10, 1949

XIX Corps Shoulder Sleeve Insignia
After March 10, 1949
This patch unofficially began use around January 1944 and was the primary patch used during WWII, and was worn throughout the 1950s-60s.
