= Samuel Tankersley Williams =

United States Army general (1897–1984)

- Lieutenant General Samuel T. Williams in 1955.
- Born: 25 August 1897; Denton, Texas, United States
- Died: 26 April 1984 (aged 86); San Antonio, Texas, United States
- Burial place: Fort Sam Houston National Cemetery, Texas, United States
- Spouse: Jewell Charlotte (Spear) Williams (m. 1921-1984, his death)
- Military career
- Allegiance: United States
- Branch: United States Army
- Service years: 1916–1960
- Rank: Lieutenant General
- Nickname: "Hanging Sam"
- Service number: 0-8472
- Unit: Infantry Branch
- Commands: 378th Infantry Regiment; 26th Infantry Regiment; 25th Infantry Division; XVI Corps; IX Corps; Fourth Army; Military Assistance and Advisory Group, Vietnam
- Conflicts: Pancho Villa Expedition; World War I World War II; Korean War; Vietnam War
- Awards: Distinguished Service Cross; Army Distinguished Service Medal; Silver Star; Legion of Merit; Purple Heart; Soldier's Medal; Bronze Star

Samuel Tankersley Williams (25 August 1897 – 26 April 1984) was a senior United States Army officer. Williams became prominent in army history for being reduced in rank from brigadier general to colonel, and then resuscitating his career to again advance to general officer rank. He also commanded the 25th Infantry Division during the Korean War and as a lieutenant general he served as commander of Military Assistance and Advisory Group – Vietnam, the predecessor to Military Assistance Command – Vietnam.

== Biography ==
=== Early life and military career ===
Williams was born in Denton, Texas on August 25, 1897. He attended the schools of Denton, and graduated from Denton High School in 1916. In May 1916, he enlisted as a private in the Texas Army National Guard. He took part in the expedition against Pancho Villa, advancing to corporal and sergeant in 1917. Having claimed an 1896 date of birth in order to meet the minimum age for a commission, In May 1917 Williams began the officers training course at Camp Bullis, Leon Springs, Texas. He received his commission in August 1917, four months after the American entry into World War I, and was appointed a second lieutenant in the Infantry Branch of the Officer Reserve Corps.

From 1917 to 1919, Williams served with the 359th Infantry Regiment, part of the 90th Division, as part of the American Expeditionary Forces (AEF) on the Western Front. He took part in offensives including the Battle of Saint-Mihiel, and the Meuse–Argonne offensive, the largest battle in the history of the United States Army, and in the Toul Sector, receiving a serious wound while serving as commander of Company I of the regiment's 3rd Battalion.

=== Between the wars ===
After the war ended on 11 November 1918, he remained in the army and was assigned to the 30th Infantry Regiment. Williams was commissioned as a first lieutenant in the Regular Army in 1920. He continued to serve in positions of increasing rank and responsibility in the 1920s and 1930s, including assignments with the 21st Infantry Regiment in Hawaii and the 29th Infantry Regiment at Fort Benning, Georgia.

Williams was also an avid polo player, and was a member of the army team that won international championships in the 1920s.

He completed the Infantry Company Officers Course at Fort Benning in 1926 and the Infantry Officer Advanced Course in 1931. He graduated from the U.S. Army Command and General Staff School in 1936 and the U.S. Army War College in 1938. On August 18, 1940, as the United States was preparing for World War II, he was promoted to lieutenant colonel.

=== World War II ===
The Japanese attack on Pearl Harbor and the subsequent German declaration of war against the United States in December 1941 officially brought the country into World War II. Williams was promoted to colonel in the Army of the United States (AUS) on August 7, 1942. By 1943, he was the commanding officer (CO) of the 378th Infantry Regiment, part of the 95th Infantry Division, Williams was in command of the 378th Infantry at Camp Swift, Texas when a member of the organization was tried for the rape and murder of a nine-year-old girl. Williams was a member of the court-martial, and growing annoyed with the drawn-out proceedings, suggested that the trial ought to be ended quickly, since the defendant's guilt was not in doubt and he deserved execution by hanging. The nickname "Hanging Sam" attached to him as a result, and remained with him for the rest of his career.

Williams was subsequently promoted to the rank of brigadier general (AUS) on 22 March 1943, and named as the Assistant Division Commander (ADC) of the 90th "Tough Ombres" Infantry Division, the organization with which he had served in during World War I. Reactivated for World War II, the 90th Division took part in Operation Overlord, the Allied invasion of Northern France, in June 1944.

The 90th Infantry Division landed at Utah Beach on D-Day+1 (7 June 1944, a day after the initial invasion). While en route to their landing site, Williams and numerous 90th Division soldiers were on board the transport ship Susan B. Anthony when it struck a mine. Though he did not know how to swim, Williams supervised the evacuation of the wounded and transfer of soldiers to rescue craft, and then on to Utah Beach. He risked his life to venture below deck, overcoming smoke and darkness to ensure that everyone had been evacuated. He was the last one to leave the ship, which was abandoned and sank. All 2,689 people aboard were saved, which the Guinness Book of World Records lists as the largest rescue of people without loss of life. Williams received the Soldier's Medal for his actions.

=== Reduction in rank ===
Shortly after the 90th Infantry Division began its part in the Normandy invasion, Major General J. Lawton Collins, the VII Corps commander, decided that the unit was not performing satisfactorily in combat. As a result, he relieved Brigadier General Jay W. MacKelvie, the division commander, and two regimental commanders. MacKelvie's successor, Major General Eugene M. Landrum, was shortly afterwards involved in a verbal altercation with Williams and requested Williams' reduction in rank from brigadier general to colonel and reassignment to a staff position. By then, the 90th Division was part of the VIII Corps, and the corps commander, Major General Troy H. Middleton, concurred with Landrum's request, which was carried out.

After his reduction in rank, Major General Henry Terrell Jr., who was acquainted with Williams from Terrell's time as commander of the 90th Division from 1942 to 1943, requested Williams as Terrell's Training and Operations officer, G-3 for XXII Corps. In this role, Williams planned and oversaw execution of missions in the European Theater of Operations (ETO).

In the fall of 1944, after Williams had been reduced in rank, the recommendation to award him the Silver Star was approved. He received the award for heroism on 15 June 1944, when he assisted in maneuvering and positioning lead units of the 90th Division during an assault on Gourbesville.

Near the end of the war, Williams served as the Chief of Staff of XXII Corps.

=== Postwar ===
In 1946, a year after the war ended, Williams was appointed commander of the 26th Infantry Regiment in West Germany, also serving as acting chief of staff, assistant division commander, and commander of the 1st Infantry Division on several occasions.

From 1950 to 1952, Williams served in the Operations and Training Office of the Army Field Forces, at Fort Monroe, Virginia. In 1951, he was promoted again to brigadier general. From 1952 to 1953, Williams commanded the 25th Infantry Division in the Korean War, earning the Distinguished Service Cross and Silver Star and receiving promotion to the two-star rank of major general. He commanded XVI Corps in Japan from 1953 to 1954. From 1954 to 1955, he led the IX Corps and served as deputy commander of the Eighth Army in South Korea. From January to September 1955, he commanded the Fourth Army at Fort Sam Houston, Texas, receiving promotion to the three-star rank of lieutenant general.

=== Service in Vietnam ===
From 1955 until his 1960 retirement, Williams commanded Military Assistance and Advisory Group – Vietnam, the first officer assigned to this position after its predecessor unit, Military Assistance Advisory Group—Indochina was reorganized. In this role, Williams was responsible for training and modernizing the Republic of Vietnam Military Forces.

In 1957, Williams filed a second request for a correction to his personnel record after an earlier request had gone unanswered. It was granted, and adjusted his birth date to 1897. As a result, his mandatory retirement date was advanced a year to August 1959. He received two waivers to serve in Vietnam past his mandatory retirement date as the result of the positive relationship he had fostered with South Vietnamese authorities, who requested to continue working with him.

=== Retirement and death ===
In his retirement, Williams lived in San Antonio, Texas. He died there on April 26, 1984, at the age of 86, and was buried at Fort Sam Houston National Cemetery, Section Ai, site 646.

== Awards and decorations ==
Williams received the Distinguished Service Cross, multiple awards of the Army Distinguished Service Medal, two awards of the Silver Star, the Legion of Merit, the Soldier's Medal, the Bronze Star, and two awards of the Purple Heart. In addition, his foreign awards and decorations included the French Legion of Honor and Croix de Guerre, the Soviet Order of the Red Banner and the South Korean Taeguuk (first grade) and Eulji (second grade) with gold star.

=== Citation for Distinguished Service Cross ===
The President of the United States of America, under the provisions of the Act of Congress approved July 9, 1918, takes pleasure in presenting the Distinguished Service Cross to Major General Samuel T. Williams, United States Army, for extraordinary heroism in connection with military operations against an armed enemy of the United Nations while serving as Commanding General of the 25th Infantry Division. Major General Williams distinguished himself by extraordinary heroism in action against enemy aggressor forces in the vicinity of Chu-Dong, Korea, on the morning of 15 July 1953. On that date, General Williams was advised of a large-scale enemy attack consisting of six hostile divisions and extending the width of the corps front. He immediately contacted all available sources of information in an effort to coordinate the defense. The reports he received were confused because of the scope of the battle, and General Williams realized that only through personal observation would he be able to secure the data he needed. Consequently, he flew in a helicopter to the scene of the battle. Dipping repeatedly to within a few feet of the hostile positions, General Williams noted the disposition of the foe without regard for the heavy fire directed against his craft. At one point, a bullet ripped through the plastic canopy of the helicopter, narrowly missing him. However, even this did not cause him to turn back. Instead, he passed again and again over the battle area until satisfied that he had gathered sufficient information upon which to base an effective defense. Only then did he return to his command post to plan and coordinate a counter operation which substantially reduced the fighting potential of the hostile force through the tremendous casualties they suffered.

General Orders: Headquarters, Eighth U.S. Army, Korea Order: General Orders No. 710, (30 July 1953) Action Date: 15 July 1953 Service: Army Rank: Major General Division: Commanding General, 25th Infantry Division

== Other ==
Williams' papers are stored at Stanford University's Hoover Institution.

He was the subject of a biography, 1990's Hanging Sam: a Military Biography of General Samuel T. Williams from Pancho Villa to Vietnam, by Harold J. Meyer.
