= 90th Infantry Division (United States) =

- 90th Infantry Division shoulder sleeve insignia
- Active: 5 August 1917–17 June 1919 (National Army); 24 June 1921–27 December 1945 (Organized Reserves); 4 August 1947–31 December 1965 (Army Reserve); lineage continues with 90th Sustainment Brigade
- Country: United States
- Branch: United States Army
- Type: Infantry
- Size: Division
- Garrison/HQ: San Antonio, TX
- Nicknames: "Tough 'Ombres" (special designation); Texas-Oklahoma Division
- Engagements: World War I; St. Mihiel; Meuse-Argonne; Lorraine 1918; World War II; Normandy with arrowhead; Northern France; Rhineland; Ardennes-Alsace; Central Europe
- Decorations: French Croix de guerre with palm

Commanders
- Notable commanders: James A. Van Fleet; Raymond S. McLain; James Earl Rudder; Robert H. Travis

Insignia
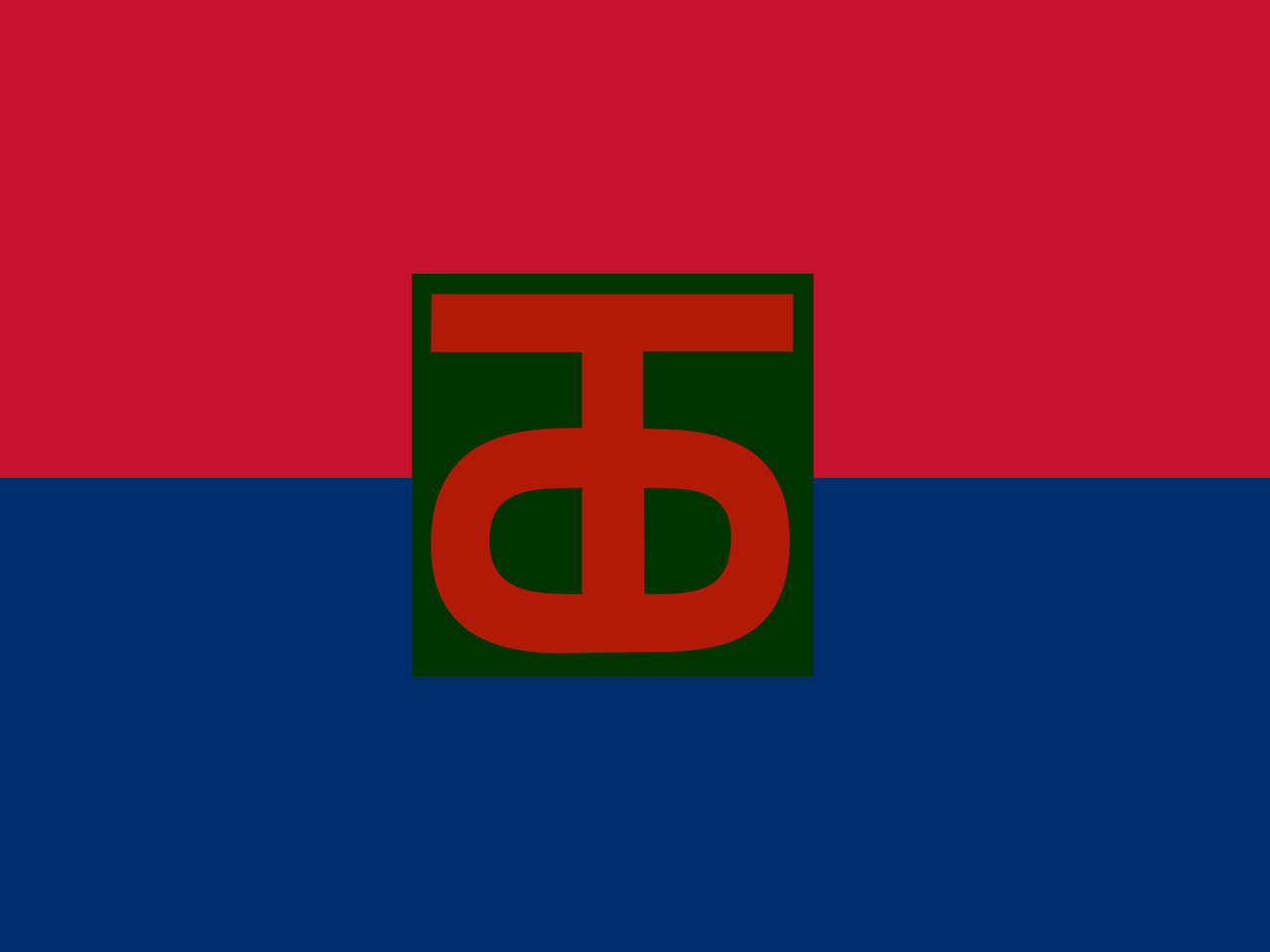
- Flag of the United States Army 90th Infantry Division

The 90th Infantry Division ("Tough 'Ombres") was a unit of the United States Army that served in World War I and World War II. Its lineage is carried on by the 90th Sustainment Brigade.

== History ==
=== World War I ===
- Activated: August 1917.
- Overseas: June 1918.
- Major Operations: St. Mihiel, Meuse-Argonne.
- Casualties: Total-7,549 (KIA-1,091; WIA-6,458).
- Commanders: Maj. Gen. Henry T. Allen (25 August 1917), Brig. Gen. Joseph A. Gaston (23 November 1917), Brig. Gen. William Johnston Jr. (27 December 1917), Maj. Gen. Henry T. Allen (1 March 1918), Brig. Gen. Joseph P. O'Neil (24 November 1918), Maj. Gen. Charles H. Martin (30 December 1918).
- Returned to U.S. and inactivated: June 1919.

The 90th Division was constituted in the National Army by the War Department on 5 August 1917, and was directed be organized at Camp Travis, Texas, from draftees from Texas and Oklahoma. The division was organized beginning in the first week of September from a cadre of officers and men of the Regular Army, and from Officers' Reserve Corps and National Army officer graduates of the First Officers' Training Camp at Leon Springs, Texas. 2,300 draftees arrived from 5–10 September, and another 18,400 from 19–24 September, after which systematic training began. Another 10,000 men arrived at Camp Travis early in October 1917, and the division approximated 22,500 men.

Between January and June 1918, 50,000 men arrived at Camp Travis, but departures aggregated 35,000. Early in 1918, the 90th Division received new men, many from Texas and Oklahoma, but transfers to Camp Doniphan, Oklahoma, Camp Hancock, Georgia, Camp Johnston, Florida, and Fort Sheridan, Illinois reduced its strength to about 15,000 by April. On 20–21 May 1918, new men from Illinois, Minnesota, North Dakota, and South Dakota arrived from Camp Dodge, Iowa. On 31 May, the division approximated 24,000 men. In June 1918, the division proceeded from Camp Mills, New York, to the ports of Boston, Brooklyn, New York, and Philadelphia. After sailing to England in stages, the division proceeded to France. In late August, the 90th Division entered the front lines, participating in the Battle of St. Mihiel in September and the Meuse-Argonne Offensive in October–November 1918. In four months of combat, the 90th Division suffered 7,549 casualties (1,091 killed in action and 6,458 wounded in action). From December 1918 to May 1919, the division was stationed near Trier, Germany, in the Army of Occupation.

==== Order of battle ====
- Headquarters, 90th Division
- 179th Infantry Brigade
  - 357th Infantry Regiment
  - 358th Infantry Regiment
  - 344th Machine Gun Battalion
- 180th Infantry Brigade
  - 359th Infantry Regiment
  - 360th Infantry Regiment
  - 345th Machine Gun Battalion
- 165th Field Artillery Brigade
  - 343rd Field Artillery Regiment (75 mm)
  - 344th Field Artillery Regiment (75 mm)
  - 345th Field Artillery Regiment (155 mm)
  - 315th Trench Mortar Battery
- 343rd Machine Gun Battalion
- 315th Engineer Regiment
- 315th Field Signal Battalion
- Headquarters Troop, 90th Division
- 315th Train Headquarters and Military Police
  - 315th Ammunition Train
  - 315th Supply Train
  - 315th Engineer Train
  - 315th Sanitary Train
    - 357th, 358th, 359th, and 360th Ambulance Companies and Field Hospitals

=== Interwar period ===
The 90th Division headquarters arrived at the port of Boston, Massachusetts, aboard the SS Magnolia on 7 June 1919 after 12 months of overseas service and was demobilized on 17 June 1919 at Camp Bowie, Texas. Pursuant to the National Defense Act of 1920, the 90th Division was reconstituted in the Organized Reserve on 24 June 1921, allotted to the Eighth Corps Area, and assigned to the XVIII Corps. The division was further allotted to the state of Texas. The division headquarters was organized on 8 August 1921 with its offices located in the library of the Eighth Corps Area headquarters at Fort Sam Houston, Texas. The headquarters was relocated on 14 September 1921 to the Gunter Hotel in San Antonio, Texas, and relocated again in June 1923 to Building 42-T at Fort Sam Houston. The headquarters was relocated once more in July 1926 to the Alamo Building in San Antonio and remained there until activated for World War II.

After activation, the division’s recruiting efforts were such that by January 1924, the division was at 99 percent of its authorized strength, which was the highest for any Organized Reserve division at the time. To maintain communications with the officers of the division, the division staff published a newsletter titled “The 90th Division Bulletin.” The newsletter informed the division’s members of such things as when and where the inactive training sessions were to be held, what the division’s summer training quotas were, where the camps were to be held, and which units would be assigned to help conduct the Citizens Military Training Camps (CMTC). The designated mobilization and training stations for the division were Fort Sam Houston and Camp Bullis, Texas, where much of the 90th Division’s training activities occurred in the interwar years. The headquarters and staff usually trained with the staff of the 2nd Division at Fort Sam Houston. The subordinate infantry regiments of the division held their summer training primarily with the 2nd Division's 9th and 23rd Infantry Regiments at Camp Bullis. Other units, such as the special troops, artillery, engineers, aviation, medical, and quartermaster, also trained at Fort Sam Houston or Camp Bullis with like units of the 2nd Division. For the summer training camps of May 1932 and May 1933, the 90th Division headquarters, special troops, 315th Medical Regiment, and 90th Division Quartermaster Train participated in maneuvers with the 2nd Division at Camp Bullis. In addition to the unit training camps, the infantry regiments of the division rotated responsibility to conduct the CMTC training held at Fort Sam Houston each year.

During the inactive training period, the 90th Division staff would hold occasional contact camps at Texas A&M College in Bryan, Texas. On a number of occasions, the division headquarters and staff, and occasionally the division's three brigade headquarters, participated in Eighth Corps Area and Third Army command post exercises in conjunction with other Regular Army, National Guard, and Organized Reserve units. Unlike the Regular and Guard units in the Eighth Corps Area, the 90th Division did not participate in the various Eighth Corps Area maneuvers and the Third Army maneuvers of 1938, 1940, and 1941 as an organized unit due to lack of enlisted personnel and equipment. Instead, the officers and a few enlisted reservists were assigned to Regular and Guard units to fill vacant slots and bring those units up to war strength for the exercises. Additionally, some officers were assigned duties as umpires or support personnel. For each maneuver, the division maximized the number of participants. For example, for the 1938 maneuver at Camp Bullis, the 90th Division provided 138 officers to the 2nd Division and 66 to the Texas National Guard's 36th Division. Similar numbers participated in the two succeeding exercises.

=== World War II ===
- Ordered into active military service: 25 March 1942 at Camp Barkeley, Texas.
- Overseas: 23 March 1944.
- Distinguished Unit Citations: 5.
- Campaigns: Normandy, Northern France, Ardennes-Alsace, Rhineland, Central Europe
- Days of Combat: 308
- Awards: MH-4; DSC-54; DSM-4; SS-1,418; LM-19; DFC-4; SM-55; BSM-6,140; AM-121.
- Commanders: Maj. Gen. Henry Terrell Jr. (March 1942 – January 1944), Brig. Gen. Jay W. MacKelvie (5 April 1944), Maj. Gen. Eugene M. Landrum (13 June 1944), Maj. Gen. Raymond S. McLain (30 July 1944), Maj. Gen. James A. Van Fleet (15 October 1944), Maj. Gen. Lowell Ward Rooks (22 January 1945), Maj. Gen. Herbert L. Earnest (2 March 1945).
- Assistant Division Commanders: Brig. Gen. Charles W. Ryder (March − May 1942), Brig. Gen. Alan W. Jones (1942–1943), Brig. Gen. Samuel Tankersley Williams (February 1943 − July 1944), Brig. Gen. William G. Weaver (July − November 1944), Brig. Gen. Joseph M. Tully (16 November 1944 – 16 October 1945)
- Artillery Commanders: George D. Shea (July 1942 – September 1943)
- Returned to U.S.: 16 December 1945.
- Inactivated: 27 December 1945 at Camp Myles Standish, Massachusetts.

==== Mobilization ====
Before Organized Reserve infantry divisions were ordered into active military service, they were reorganized on paper as "triangular" divisions under the 1940 tables of organization. The headquarters companies of the two infantry brigades were consolidated into the division's cavalry reconnaissance troop, and one infantry regiment was removed by inactivation. The field artillery brigade headquarters and headquarters battery became the headquarters and headquarters battery of the division artillery. Its three field artillery regiments were reorganized into four battalions; one battalion was taken from each of the two 75 mm gun regiments to form two 105 mm howitzer battalions, the brigade's ammunition train was reorganized as the third 105 mm howitzer battalion, and the 155 mm howitzer battalion was formed from the 155 mm howitzer regiment. The engineer, medical, and quartermaster regiments were reorganized into battalions. In 1942, divisional quartermaster battalions were split into ordnance light maintenance companies and quartermaster companies, and the division's headquarters and military police company, which had previously been a combined unit, was split.

The officer cadre for the 90th Infantry Division came mostly from the 6th and 33rd Infantry Divisions, while the enlisted cadre came from the 6th Infantry Division. The enlisted fillers came from reception centers mostly located in the Northwest, Midwest, and Southwest, but a preponderance of the men were from Fort Sam Houston and Camp Wolters, Texas, and Fort Sill, Oklahoma.

==== Division organization ====
The division consisted of the following units:

90th Infantry Division organization (click to enlarge)

- 90th Infantry Division
  - 90th Infantry Division Headquarters
  - 90th Cavalry Reconnaissance Troop (Mechanized) (M3 scout cars and then M8 Greyhound armored cars)
  - 357th Infantry Regiment
    - Headquarters and Headquarters Company
    - 3× Infantry battalions
      - each battalion consists of: 1× Headquarters and Headquarters Company, 3× Rifle companies, 1× Heavy Weapons Company
    - Cannon Company (T12 Gun Motor Carriages and T19 Howitzer Motor Carriages, later replaced by either M3 105mm towed howitzers or M7 Priest self propelled howitzers)
    - Anti-Tank Company (M3 37mm anti-tank guns, which were replaced by 1944 with M1 57mm anti-tank guns)
    - Service Company
  - 358th Infantry Regiment
    - same organization as 357th Infantry Regiment
  - 359th Infantry Regiment
    - same organization as 357th Infantry Regiment
  - 90th Infantry Division Artillery
    - Headquarters and Headquarters Battery
    - 343rd Field Artillery Battalion
      - Headquarters and Headquarters Battery
      - 3× Batteries (M2 105mm towed howitzers)
      - Service Battery
    - 344th Field Artillery Battalion
      - same organization as 343rd Field Artillery Battalion
    - 345th Field Artillery Battalion
      - Headquarters and Headquarters Battery
      - 3× Batteries (M1 155mm towed howitzers)
      - Service Battery
    - 915th Field Artillery Battalion
      - same organization as 343rd Field Artillery Battalion
  - Headquarters Special Troops
    - Headquarters Company, 90th Infantry Division
    - 90th Signal Company
    - 90th Quartermaster Company
    - 790th Ordnance Light Maintenance Company
    - Military Police Platoon
    - 90th Infantry Division Band (attached)
  - 315th Engineer Combat Battalion
    - Headquarters and Headquarters and Service Company
    - 3× Engineer combat companies
  - 315th Medical Battalion
    - Headquarters and Headquarters Detachment
    - 3× Collecting companies
    - Clearing Company

==== Combat chronicle ====
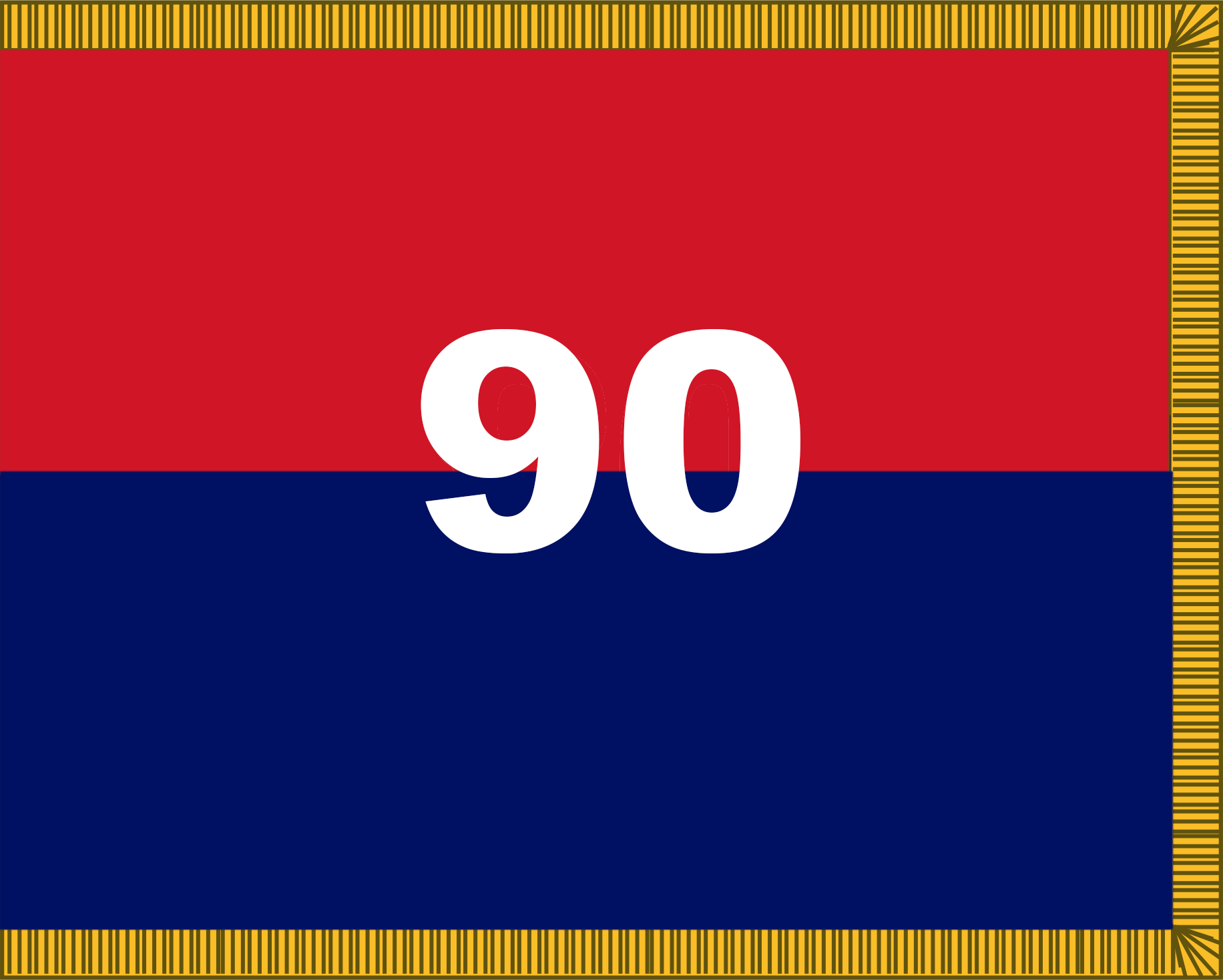
90th Infantry Division Flag (WWII Era)

Artillerymen of a cannon company of the division fire an M3 105mm howitzer near Carentan, France, 11 June 1944.

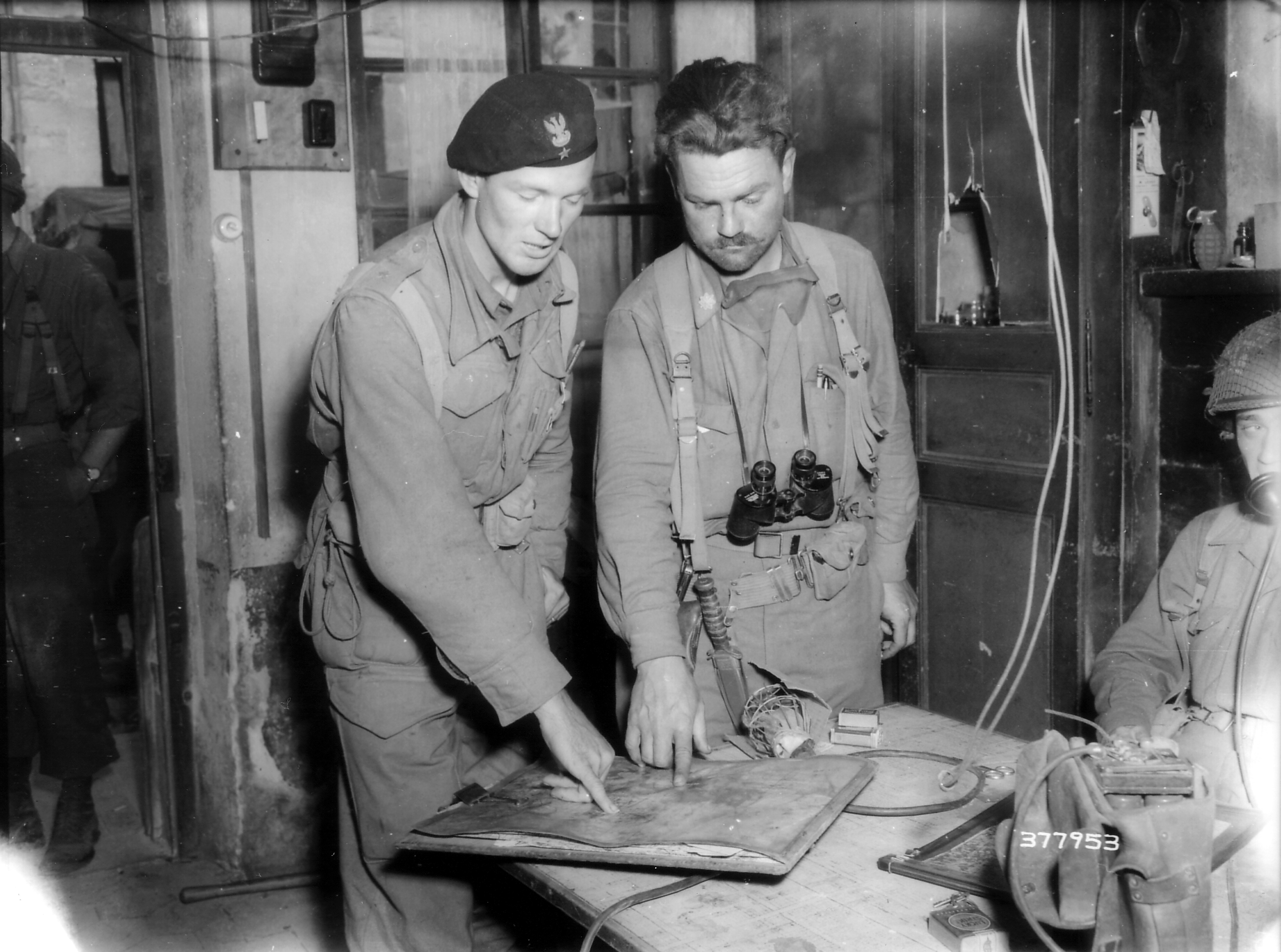
Lieutenant of the 1st Polish Armoured Division and American officer of the 359th Infantry Regiment after the units meet up at Chambois, August 1944.

The 90th Infantry Division landed in England, 5 April 1944, and trained from 10 April to 4 June.

The first elements of the division saw action on D-Day, 6 June, on Utah Beach, Normandy, the remainder entering combat 10 June, cutting across the Merderet River to take Pont l'Abbe in heavy fighting. After defensive action along the river Douve, the division attacked to clear the Foret de Mont-Castre (Hill 122), clearing it by 11 July, in spite of fierce resistance. In this action, the division suffered 5,000 men killed, wounded, or captured. An attack on the island of Saint-Germain-sur-Sèves on 23 July failed so the 90th bypassed it and took Périers on 27 July.

On 12 August, the division drove across the Sarthe River, north and east of Le Mans, and took part in the closing of the Falaise Gap, by reaching 1st Polish Armored Division in Chambois, 19 August.

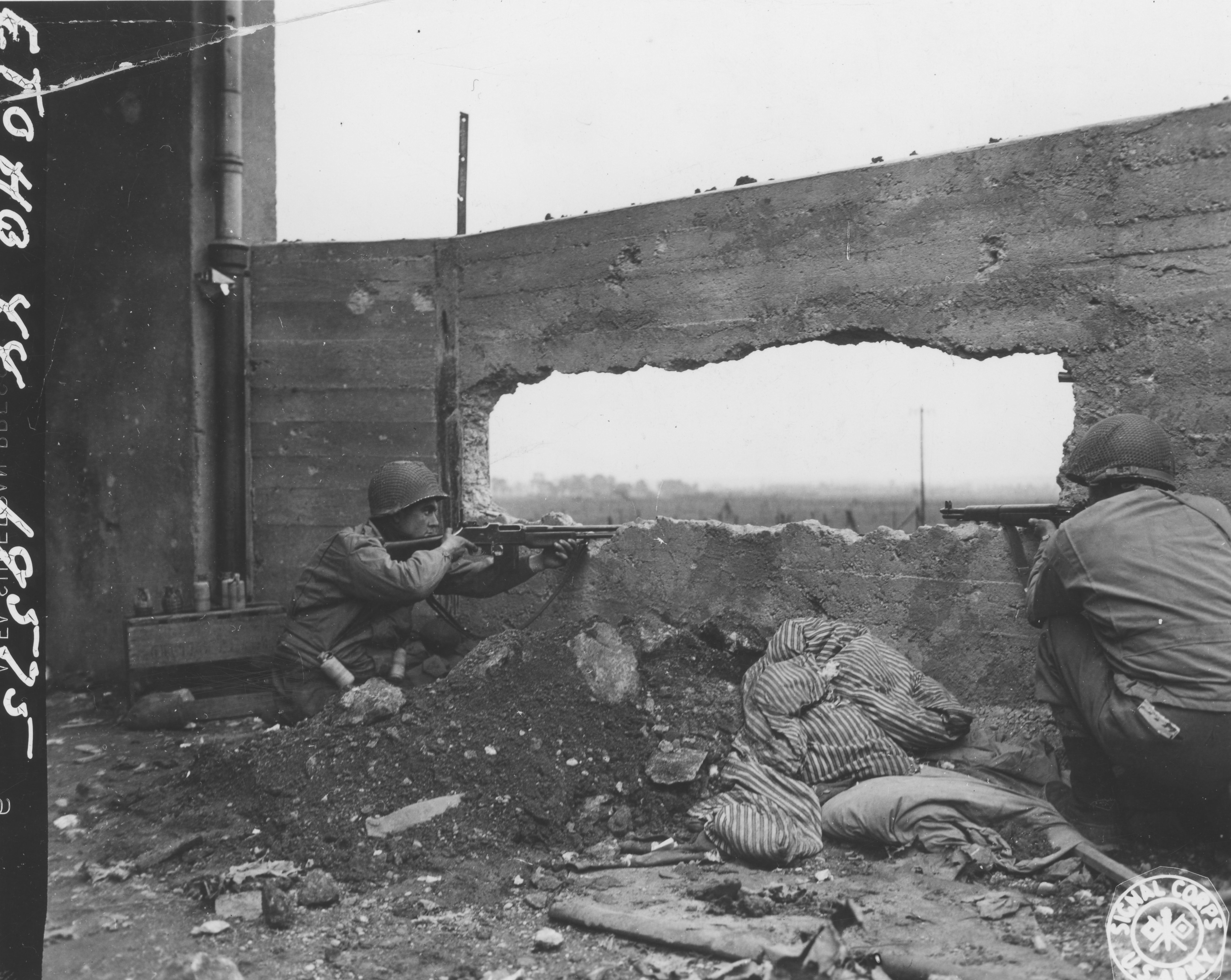
357th Regiment, take shelter behind a blasted wall and keep an eye out for enemy snipers, near Maizeres Les Metz, France.

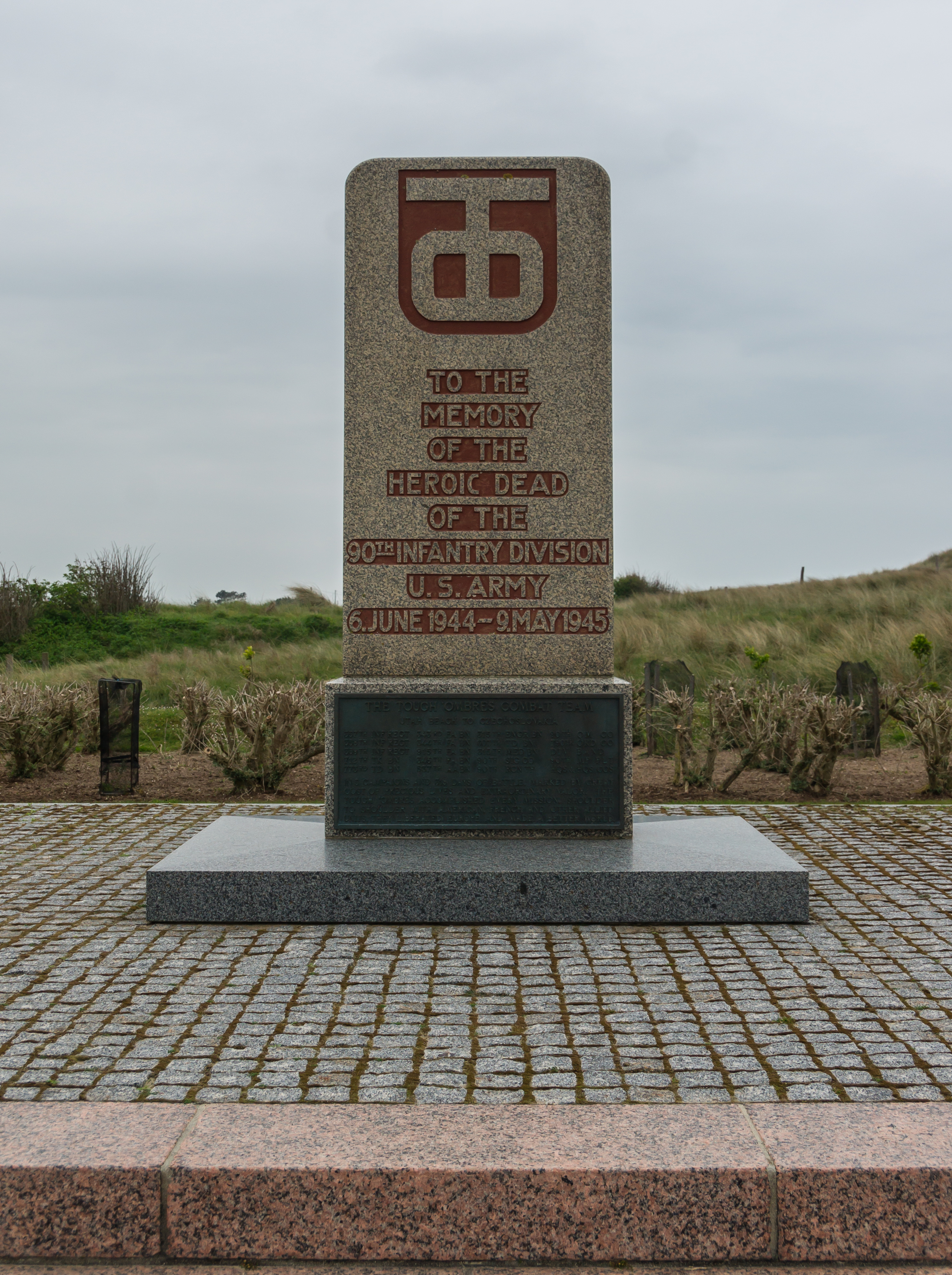
The monument to the 90th Infantry Division at Utah Beach, Normandy, France.

It then raced across France, through Verdun, 6 September, to participate in the Battle of Metz, 14 September – 19 November, capturing Maizières-lès-Metz, 30 October, and crossing the Moselle River at Kœnigsmacker, 9 November. Elements of the 90th Infantry assaulted and captured the German-held Fort de Koenigsmacker 9–12 November.

On 6 December 1944, the division pushed across the Saar River and established a bridgehead north of Saarlautern (present-day Saarlouis), 6–18 December, but with the outbreak of Gerd von Rundstedt's (Army Group A) drive, the Battle of the Bulge, withdrew to the west bank on 19 December, and went on the defensive until 5 January 1945, when it shifted to the scene of the Ardennes struggle, having been relieved along the Saar River by the 94th Infantry Division. It drove across the Our River, near Oberhausen, 29 January, to establish and expand a bridgehead. On 19 February, the division smashed through Siegfried Line fortifications to the Prüm River.

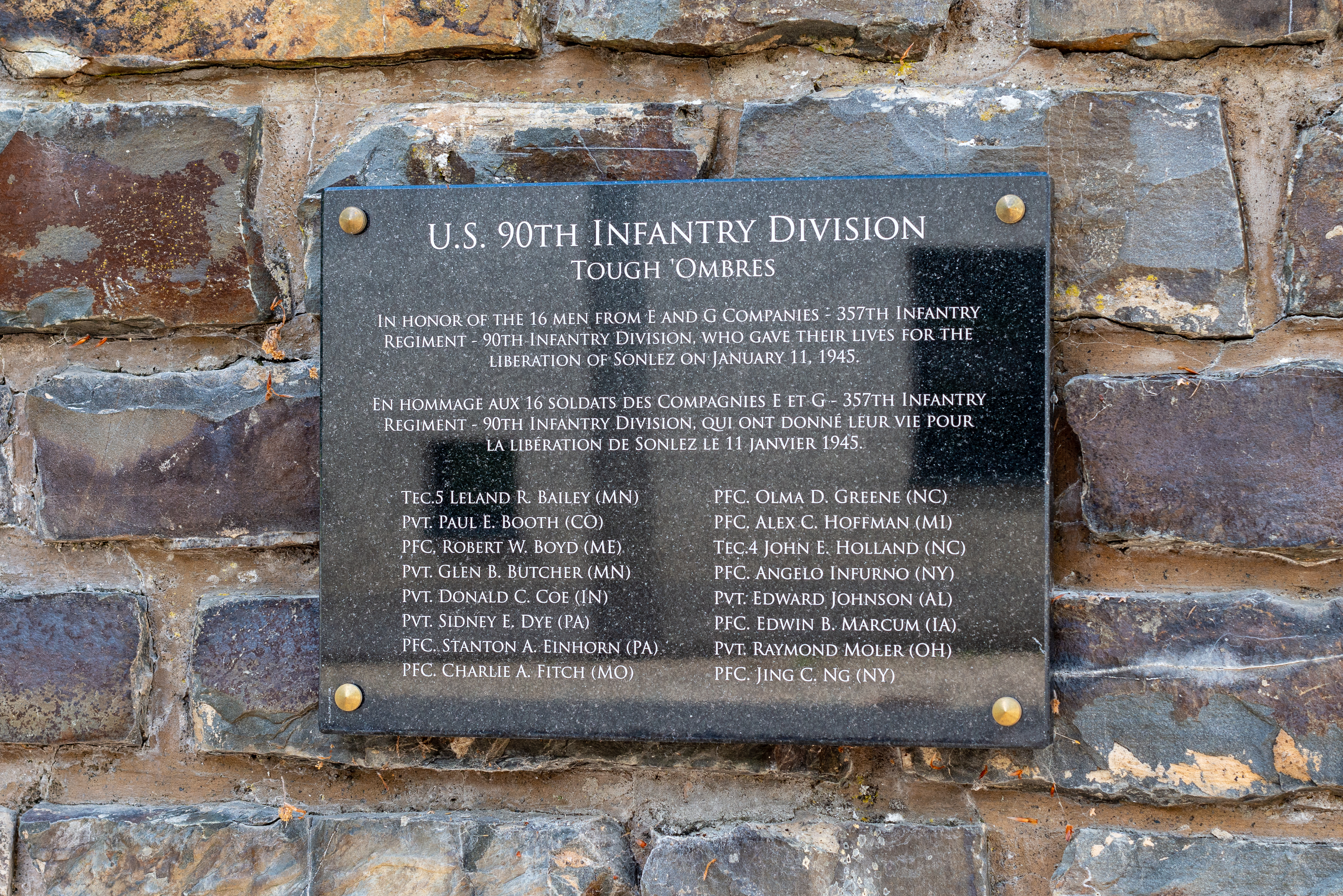
16 Tough 'Ombres killed in action during the Battle of the Bulge in Sonlez.

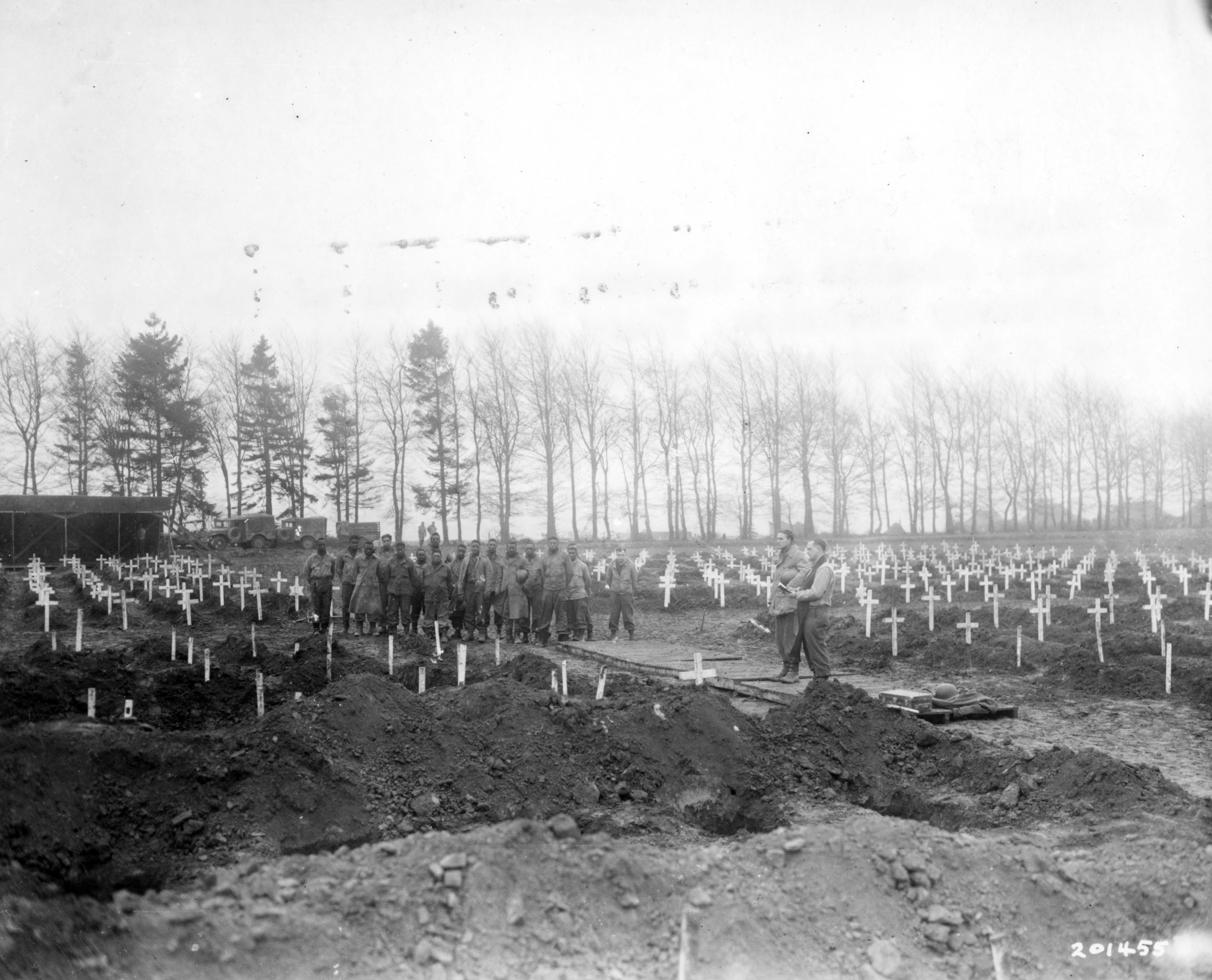
The 90th Division's military chaplain leads a field service for 3201st Quartermaster Service Company in Foy, Belgium (26 February 1945)

After a short rest, the 90th continued across the Moselle River to take Mainz, 22 March, and crossed the rivers Rhine, the Main, and the Werra in rapid succession. Pursuit continued to the Czech border, 18 April 1945, and into the Sudetes mountain range. The division was en route to Prague when they came upon the remaining 1500 emaciated prisoners left behind by the SS at Flossenbürg concentration camp. Today, a memorial wall at the former camp honors the 90th as the liberators of the camp. A week later, word came that the war in Europe ended on 8 May 1945.

==== Casualties ====
- Total battle casualties: 19,200
- Killed in action: 3,342
- Wounded in action: 14,386
- Missing in action: 287
- Prisoner of war: 1,185

==== Assignments in ETO ====
- 5 March 1944: Third Army.
- 23 March 1944: Third Army, but attached to First Army.
- 27 March 1944: VII Corps.
- 19 June 1944: VIII Corps.
- 30 July 1944: Third Army, but attached to First Army.
- 1 August 1944: XV Corps, Third Army, 12th Army Group.
- 17 August 1944: Third Army, 12th Army Group, but attached to V Corps, First Army.
- 25 August 1944: XV Corps, Third Army, 12th Army Group.
- 26 August 1944: XX Corps
- 6 January 1945: III Corps.
- 26 January 1945: VIII Corps.
- 12 March 1945: XII Corps.

=== Postwar ===
The division was reactivated at Dallas on August 4, 1947, as a part of the Organized Reserve Corps. In the 1960s it became the 90th Army Reserve Command with its headquarters located at Dodd Field in San Antonio. By the mid-1990s it supervised about 9,000 personnel across Texas and New Mexico. It dispatched units to the Gulf War in 1990-91 and ran drug-demand-reduction and humanitarian programs in Central America in 1994.

Today its history is carried on by the 90th Sustainment Brigade.

== Division insignia ==
- Nickname: Tough 'Ombres; during World War I, the division was called the Texas-Oklahoma Division, represented by the T and O on the shoulder patch.
- Shoulder patch: A khaki-colored square on which is superimposed a red letter "T", the lower part of which bisects the letter "O", also in red.

== Notable personnel ==
- Major General Terry de la Mesa Allen Sr. served with this division as a battalion commander in 1918 and later served in World War II
- James A. Baker Jr.
- William H. H. Morris Jr.
