= Saint-Germain-sur-Sèves =

- Commune
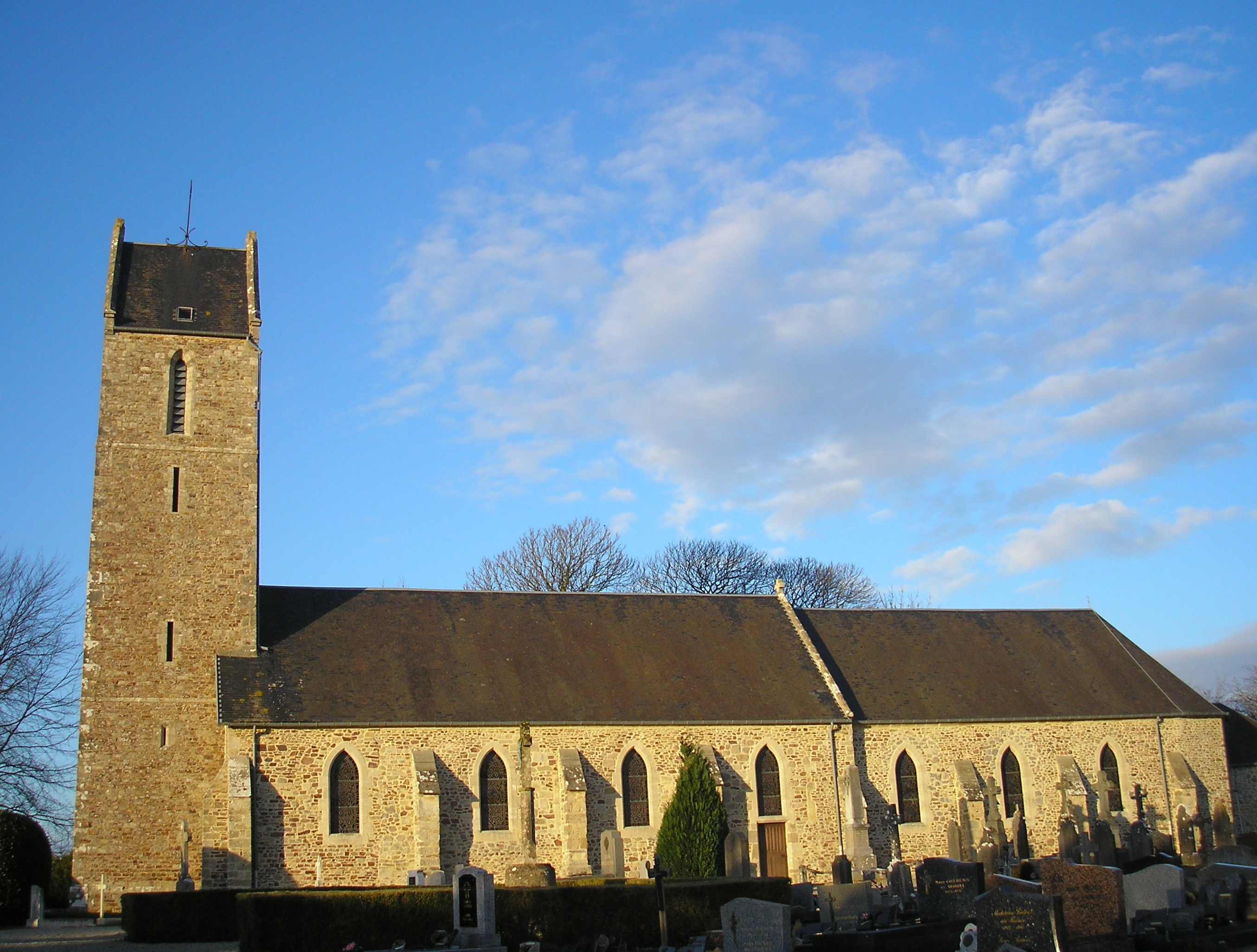
- The church in Saint-Germain-sur-Sèves
- Location of Saint-Germain-sur-Sèves
- Location within France Location within Normandy
- Coordinates: 49°13′21″N 1°22′11″W
- Country: France
- Region: Normandy
- Department: Manche
- Arrondissement: Coutances
- Canton: Agon-Coutainville

Government
  - Mayor (2020–2026): Michel Mesnil
- Area^{1}: 8.19 km^{2} (3.16 sq mi)
- Elevation: 46 m (151 ft)
- Highest elevation: 19 m (62 ft)
- Lowest elevation: 3 m (9.8 ft)
- Population (2023): 181
  - Density: 22.1/km^{2} (57.2/sq mi)
- Time zone: UTC+01:00 (CET)
  - Summer (DST): UTC+02:00 (CEST)
- INSEE/Postal code: 50482 /50190
- ^{1} French Land Register data, which excludes lakes, ponds, glaciers > 1 km^{2} (0.386 sq mi or 247 acres) and river estuaries.

Saint-Germain-sur-Sèves (French pronunciation: [sɛ̃ ʒɛʁmɛ̃ syʁ sɛv]) is a commune in the Manche department in Normandy in north-western France.

== History ==
Prior to Operation Cobra in World War II, it was an impediment, a small island in a stretch of a marshy area. The position was held by a kampfgruppe of the Das Reich Division and the 6th Parachutist Regiment (Fallschirm-Jäger-Regiment 6). The 358th Regiment of the 90th Infantry Division under General Eugene M. Landrum started the attack on 22 July, but without air support because of bad weather. The 1st Battalion suffered heavy losses but held on to the island. The 2nd battalion failed to cross the marshes. In the evening the German Fallschirmjäger with company leader Alexander Uhlig counterattacked with one tank of the 2nd Panzer Regiment. The Americans were driven back, in one hour they had suffered losses of 100 soldiers killed, 400 wounded, and 250 prisoners. Saint-Germain-Sur-Sèves was liberated a few days later in the same operation.

== See also ==
- Communes of the Manche department
