= Robert Campbell Van Vliet =

United States Army general (1857–1943)

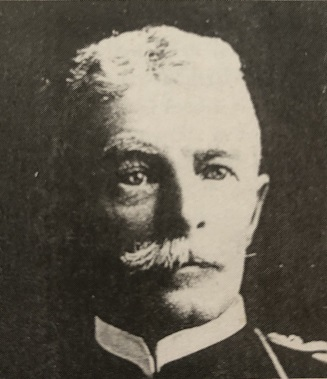
- National Archives and Records Administration photo of Van Vliet as a captain in 1898
- Born: August 22, 1857; Fort Leavenworth, Kansas, US
- Died: October 27, 1943 (aged 86); New Smyrna, Florida, US
- Burial place: Arlington National Cemetery
- Spouse: Harriet "Hattie" Stephens
- Children: 4
- Relatives: Stewart Van Vliet (father); Robert L. Spragins (son-in-law)
- Military career
- Allegiance: United States of America
- Branch: United States Army
- Service years: 1876–1919
- Rank: Brigadier General
- Commands: Company G, 10th Infantry Regiment; 25th Infantry Regiment; 4th Infantry Regiment; 173rd Infantry Brigade, 87th Division; 87th Division; Student Army Training Corps, City College of New York
- Conflicts: American Indian Wars; Spanish–American War; United States occupation of Veracruz; World War I
- Awards: Silver Star; Purple Heart

Brigadier General Robert Campbell Van Vliet (August 22, 1857 – October 27, 1943) was a career officer in the United States Army. He attained the rank of brigadier general, and was most notable for his World War I service as commander of the 87th Division.

== Biography ==
He was born at Fort Leavenworth, Kansas on August 22, 1857, the son of Stewart Van Vliet and Sarah Jane Brown. He was appointed to the United States Military Academy from New Jersey, which he attended from July to December 1875.

Van Vliet resigned before taking his midyear exams in January 1876. His father requested that President Ulysses S. Grant reappoint him to West Point. Instead, in December 1876, Grant appointed Van Vliet as a second lieutenant. Initially assigned to the 10th Infantry, Van Vliet participated in the Indian Wars, including the Geronimo campaign. He served as commander of Fort Davis in Nome, Alaska prior to the Spanish–American War. During the war, he served as commander of Company G, 10th Infantry Regiment in Cuba, including the attack on Santiago, at which he was wounded. He received the Silver Star and Purple Heart.

Van Vliet commanded several posts and garrisons, including: Fort Slocum, New York; the federal prison on Alcatraz Island in San Francisco, California; and Fort McIntosh, Texas. In 1911 and 1912 he commanded the 25th Infantry Regiment and he commanded the 4th Infantry Regiment in 1913 and 1914.

During the Veracruz expedition, Van Vliet was served as second in command of US forces under Frederick Funston. During World War I, Van Vliet's physical condition as a result of his old wound prevented him from serving in France. He was promoted to brigadier general, and assigned as commander of the 173rd Infantry Brigade and the 87th Division during their pre-deployment training at Camp Pike, Arkansas. Van Vliet's continued ill health prevented him from serving overseas, so in September 1918 he was assigned to command of the Student Army Training Corps unit at the City College of New York.

== Death and burial ==
Van Vliet retired in 1919. In retirement, he resided in Shrewsbury, New Jersey and New Smyrna, Florida. He died at the Palma Hotel in New Smyrna on October 27, 1943. He was buried at Arlington National Cemetery.

== Family ==
Van Vliet was the husband of Harriet "Hattie" Stephens (1861–1929). Their children included: Sarita (1889–1965), the wife of Lieutenant Colonel David Perry Wood; Stewart (1885–1956), a New Jersey newspaper editor and columnist; Colonel Robert C. Van Vliet Jr. (1893–1943); and Marguerite (1895–1982), the wife of Major General Robert L. Spragins.

== Sources ==
=== Newspapers ===
- "General Van Vliet, 86, In Army 42 Years, Former Commander of 87th Division Dies in Florida". The New York Times. New York, NY. October 28, 1943 – via TimesMachine.
- "Gen Van Vliet is Dead at 86". Asbury Park Press. Asbury Park, NJ. October 28, 1943 – via Newspapers.com.
- "Rites for Gen. Van Vliet To Be Held Tomorrow". The Evening Star. Washington, DC. October 29, 1943. p. A12 – via Newspapers.com.

=== Books ===
- Davis, Henry Blaine Jr. (1998). Generals in Khaki. Raleigh, NC: Pentland Press. ISBN 978-1-5719-7088-6 – via Google Books.
