= Robert L. Spragins =

United States Army general

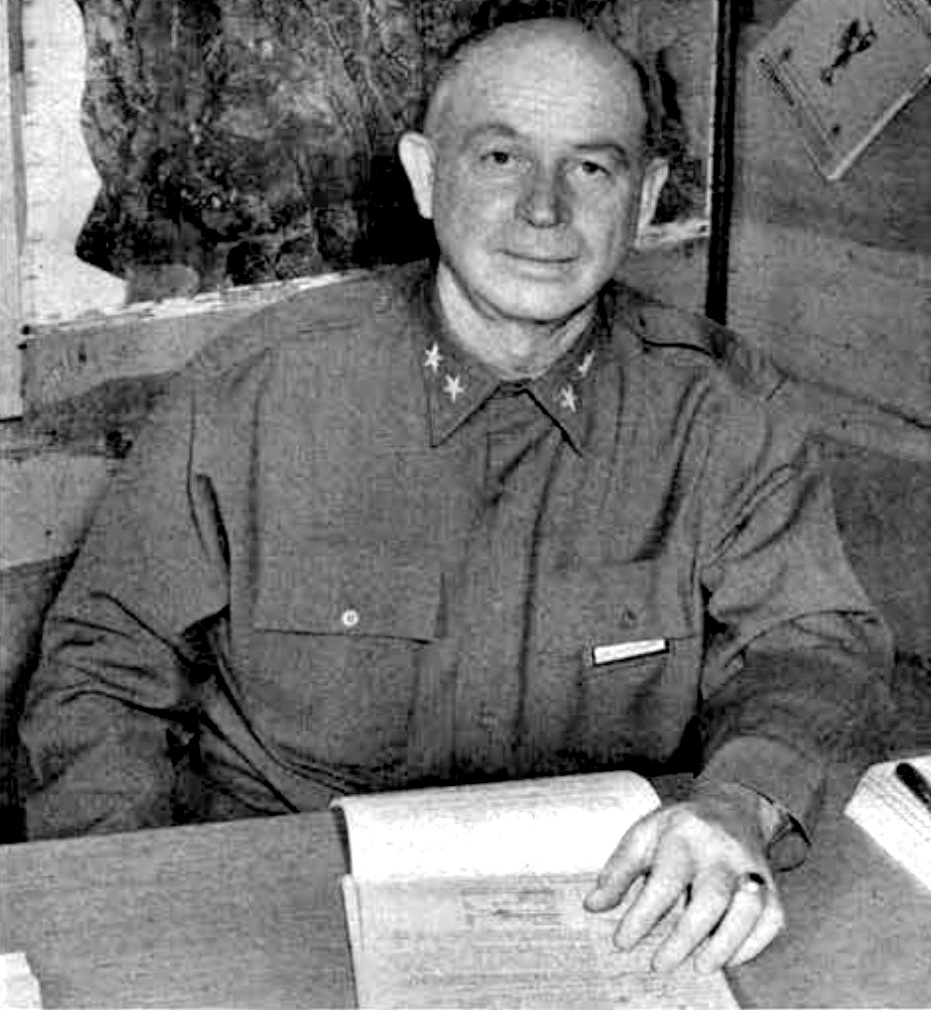
- From 1946's The History Of The 71st Infantry Division
- Born: November 12, 1890; Huntsville, Alabama, United States
- Died: December 26, 1964 (aged 74); Huntsville, Alabama, United States
- Burial place: Maple Hill Cemetery, Huntsville, Alabama, United States
- Military career
- Allegiance: United States
- Branch: United States Army
- Service years: 1913–1945
- Rank: Major General
- Service number: 0-3591
- Unit: Infantry Branch
- Commands: 71st Infantry Division; 44th Infantry Division
- Conflicts: Pancho Villa Expedition; Vera Cruz Expedition; World War I World War II
- Awards: Army Distinguished Service Medal; Silver Star; Purple Heart; Treasury Department Medal of Honor (Silver)

Major General Robert Lily Spragins (November 12, 1890 – December 26, 1964) was a senior United States Army officer. He was notable for his command of the 71st and 44th Infantry Divisions in World War II.

== Early life and military career ==
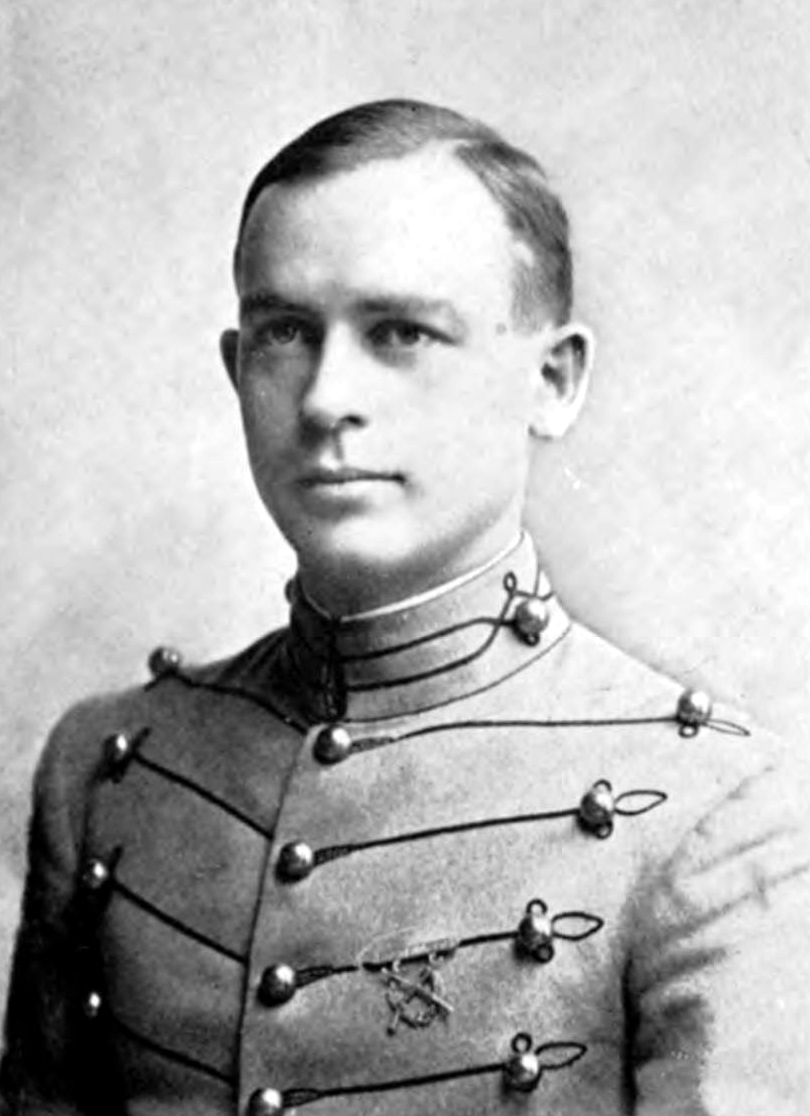
At West Point in 1913

Spragins was born in Huntsville, Alabama on November 12, 1890. His father Robert E. Spragins was a bank president who served in the Alabama State Senate and as chairman of the state Highway Commission. His mother Susan (Echols) Spragins was the daughter of a Confederate States Army officer. He attended the University of Alabama and the University of Virginia before entering the United States Military Academy (USMA) at West Point, New York in 1909. He graduated on June 12, 1913, and was ranked 77th of 93 students. He was commissioned as a second lieutenant in the Infantry Branch of the United States Army and was assigned to the 19th Infantry Regiment, then stationed in Texas.

While with the 19th Infantry Regiment, Spragins took part in both the Vera Cruz and Pancho Villa expeditions.

During 1915 and 1916, Spragins trained recruits at Fort Slocum, New York.

In 1918, the year after the American entry into World War I, Spragins completed the staff training course at the U.S. Army War College, after which he served briefly on the War Department staff. He was then assigned to the 101st Division, which was organized and trained at Camp Shelby, Mississippi. The Armistice with Germany that ended World War I occurred before the division departed for France, and it was demobilized in 1918 and 1919. During the war, Spragins was promoted to temporary major.

== Between the wars ==
In 1919, after the war, Spragins served with the 1st Division as part of the Army of Occupation in post-war Germany.

Spragins served with the 2nd Infantry Brigade and the II Corps Area Headquarters at Camp Dix, New Jersey in 1921 and 1922. He was then posted to Panama for assignment as executive officer (XO) of the 19th Brigade.

Spragins subsequently completed the advanced course for Infantry officers, as well as the Chemical Warfare course at Edgewood Arsenal, Maryland. In 1927, Spragins completed the course of instruction at the U.S. Army Command and General Staff School, where he was a Distinguished Graduate.

Spragins later served as Infantry liaison officer at Aberdeen Proving Ground, Maryland, followed by assignment to the staff of the U.S. Army Armor school at Fort Meade, Maryland. In 1935, Spragins was assigned as an advisor and trainer for the Alabama National Guard, and on August 1 he was promoted to lieutenant colonel. Spragins was assistant chief of staff for logistics (G4) for the 24th Infantry Division in 1939.

== World War II ==
Soon after being promoted to the temporary rank of colonel on June 26, 1941, Spragins was serving as chief of staff for the 24th Infantry Division in Hawaii in 1941, and took part in coordinating the initial response to the Japanese attack on Pearl Harbor. The German declaration of war on the United States followed four days later.

On May 23, 1942, Spragins was promoted to the one-star general officer rank of brigadier general and assigned as the assistant division commander (ADC) of the 95th Infantry Division. Shortly afterwards he was assigned as chief of staff for the XIV Corps. In both these assignments he took part in planning and executing operations during the Guadalcanal Campaign.

Spragins was promoted again, this time to the two-star rank of temporary major general on September 18, 1943 and assigned as commander of the 71st Infantry Division. He oversaw the 71st Division's initial organization and training, and was succeeded by Major General Eugene M. Landrum so he could then assume command of the 44th Infantry Division in August 1944. He led the 44th Division during combat in France and Germany as part of the U.S. Seventh Army, which was commanded by his West Point classmate, Lieutenant General Alexander Patch. In December 1944 he returned to the United States for medical reasons, and was succeeded by William F. Dean.

In August 1945, Spragins retired from the army and returned to Alabama.

== Postwar ==
Spragins resided in Huntsville, and worked as a real estate developer, assistant to the president of a brick making company, and manager of a veteran owned and operated taxi company.

Spragins died in Huntsville on December 26, 1964. He was buried at Maple Hill Cemetery in Huntsville.

== Awards ==
Spragins received two awards of the Army Distinguished Service Medal, one for his service with the XIV Corps, and one for his command of the 44th Division. In addition, he received the Silver Star for heroism during the Guadalcanal Campaign, and two awards of the Purple Heart. He also received the Treasury Department Medal of Honor (Silver) in February 1918 to recognize his heroism in saving two men from drowning.

== Family ==
In 1915, Spragins married Marguerite S. Van Vliet, the daughter of Brigadier General Robert Campbell Van Vliet. They were the parents of three sons, Robert Beirne (1916–2003), Charles Echols ("Pete") (1923–2014), and Stewart Van Vliet (1926–2018). Robert and Charles attained general officer rank in the Army, while Stewart retired from the U.S. Air Force with the rank of colonel.

== Sources ==
=== Internet ===
- Spragins, Robert B.; Spragins, Charles E.; Spragins, Stewart V. (1965). "Memorial, Robert L. Spragins". westpointaog.org. West Point, NY: West Point Association of Graduates. Archived from the original on May 10, 2017.

=== Books ===
- Cullum, George W.; Robinson, Wirt (1920). Biographical Register of the Officers and Graduates of the U.S. Military Academy. Vol. VI B. Saginaw, MI: Seeman & Peters. p. 1655.
- King, Edward L. (1927). Annual Report of the Commandant of the General Service Schools (PDF). Fort Leavenworth, KS: General Service Schools Press. p. 6. Archived from the original (PDF) on September 11, 2015.
- University of Virginia Alumni Association (1921). Directory of the Living Alumni of the University of Virginia. Charlottesville, VA: University of Virginia Press. p. 109.

=== Newspapers ===
- Jenks, John E. (November 4, 1922). "The Army: Infantry". Army and Navy Register. Washington, DC. p. 454.
- "Army Officer Ordered to Aberdeen for Duty". Baltimore Sun. March 17, 1932. p. 3 – via Newspapers.com.
- "State Militia Arrives at Post for Training". Anniston Star. July 29, 1935. p. 1 – via Newspapers.com.
- "General Spragins is Assistant Division Chief". Bastrop Advertiser. Bastrop, TX. July 23, 1942. p. 2.

Military offices
Preceded by Newly activated unit	Commanding General 71st Infantry Division; 1943–1944	Succeeded by Eugene M. Landrum
Preceded by James I. Muir	Commanding General 44th Infantry Division; August–December 1944	Succeeded by William F. Dean
