= Raymond S. McLain =

United States Army general (1890–1954)

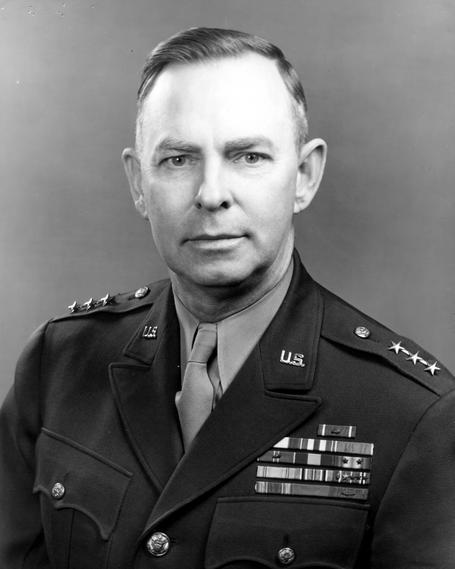
- Born: April 4, 1890; Washington County, Kentucky, United States
- Died: December 14, 1954 (aged 64); Walter Reed Army Medical Center, Washington, D.C., United States
- Burial place: Oklahoma City, Oklahoma, United States
- Military career
- Allegiance: United States
- Branch: United States Army
- Service years: 1912–1952
- Rank: Lieutenant General
- Units: Infantry Branch
- Commands: 90th Infantry Division; XIX Corps
- Conflicts: Pancho Villa Expedition; World War I World War II
- Awards: Distinguished Service Cross (2); Army Distinguished Service Medal (2)

Lieutenant General Raymond Stallings McLain (April 4, 1890 – December 14, 1954) was a senior United States Army officer. From October 1944, through the end of World War II, McLain commanded XIX Corps (United States).

In the words of General George C. Marshall, Raymond S. McLain "gave great distinction to the term 'citizen soldier'". His service to his state and nation spanned more than forty years.

== Early life and military career ==
Raymond McLain was born in Washington County, Kentucky, as a son of Thomas A. and Lucetta (Stallings) McLain. He graduated from Hill's Business College in Oklahoma City in 1909 and subsequently worked as a clerk in real estate office and then worked as an abstractor. Simultaneously, he entered in the Oklahoma Army National Guard in 1912, where he attained the rank of sergeant.

In December 1914, during World War I (although the United States was still neutral at this stage), he was commissioned as an officer, with the rank of second lieutenant in the Oklahoma Army National Guard after he attended the School of Musketry at Fort Sill, Oklahoma. He was promoted again next year to the rank of first lieutenant. Following the Pancho Villa Expedition in 1916, he served on the Mexican border.

The American entry into World War I came on April 6, 1917. During the war, Raymond served as a machine gun company commander with the 36th Division on the Western Front with the American Expeditionary Force (AEF) under General John Pershing until 1919. After return home, he continued his service with the Oklahoma Army National Guard and subsequently returned to his career in business.

== Between the wars ==
McLain was commissioned in the Oklahoma National Guard as a captain in the infantry as adjutant on the staff of the 179th Infantry Regiment on 12 April 1921. On 19 October 1922, he was promoted to major as commander of the regiment's 1st Battalion. In early 1924, he moved to the division staff and was made G-3 (operations and training officer), being promoted to lieutenant colonel on 8 February. In late 1925, he was named division chief of staff, and was promoted to colonel on 22 December 1925.

He was made a brigadier general on 2 April 1937 as commander of the division's 70th Field Artillery Brigade. He graduated from the National Guard officers' course at the United States Army Command and General Staff College at Fort Leavenworth, Kansas, in 1938.

== World War II ==
During the 45th Infantry Division's train-up period prior to U.S. involvement in World War II and during the early part of the U.S. involvement in the war, McLain commanded the division artillery. He led the artillery overseas during the Allied invasion of Sicily, Operation Husky, in July–August 1943, where he earned the first of two Distinguished Service Crosses. He continued to lead the artillery in the Allied invasion of Italy in September, and in the early stages of the Italian campaign.

He was sent to England in the spring of 1944, assuming command of the division artillery of the 30th Infantry Division. His performance in the Italian campaign gained the respect of many of his Regular Army colleagues, such as Omar Bradley, Mark W. Clark, John P. Lucas, Troy H. Middleton, and even George S. Patton, who was normally very critical of many of his fellow senior officers. Lucas wrote about McLain:

He is an exceptionally capable field artilleryman and a very gallant soldier.

During the Battle of Normandy in July 1944, McLain took command of the 90th Infantry Division, which was having numerous command problems. McLain transformed the 90th into a first-class fighting formation, and led it across France in the Allied advance from Paris to the Rhine and in many battles on the Western Front.

In October, he assumed command of the XIX Corps, remaining its commander for the rest of the war. He was the only National Guardsman to command a corps in combat during World War II.

== Postwar ==
McClain was promoted to temporary lieutenant general on 6 June 1945 and to permanent brigadier general in the Regular Army. He served as Chief of Information for the US Army from 1948 to 1949. In 1949 he became the Comptroller of the United States Army, and was appointed as the Army's first statutory comptroller general.

In 1952 he retired from the Army after 40 years of service. At the time of his death in 1954, he was serving on President Dwight D. Eisenhower's National Security Training Commission.

He died at Walter Reed General Hospital in Washington, D.C., on December 14, 1954, at the age of 64.

== Honors ==
Tulsa Public High School Named is his honor.

For the service and performance exhibited by McLain in his military career, the Tulsa Public Schools built and honored General McLain, by opening McLain High School, in September, 1959. In the years that followed its opening, many relatives, friends and descendants of General McLain attended school assemblies and honored him. After almost 50 years of graduating many young adults who have achieved similar excellence in their own lives from McLain, today McLain High School now serves the community in an occupational job program role.

On May 22 and 23, 2009, the McLain High School graduates of the first three classes came together for a joint class reunion and honored General McLain and the schools' 50th birthday.

== Decorations ==
Lieutenant General McLain's decorations include: Distinguished Service Cross with Oak leaf Cluster (Sicily, 1943 and France, 1944), Army Distinguished Service Medal with Oak leaf Cluster (France, 1944 and Germany, 1945), Silver Star (Italy, 1943), Legion of Merit, Bronze Star with Oak leaf Cluster (Italy, 1944 and Germany, 1945), Mexican Border Service Medal, World War I Victory Medal with two battle clasps, American Defense Service Medal, American Campaign Medal, European-African-Middle Eastern Campaign Medal with one silver and three bronze service stars and Arrowhead device, World War II Victory Medal, Army of Occupation Medal, Chevalier of the Legion of Honor, French Croix de Guerre 1939–1945, Grand officer of the Order of Orange-Nassau with swords, Commander of the Order of Leopold II and Belgian Croix de Guerre.

Lieutenant General McLain's ribbon bar:

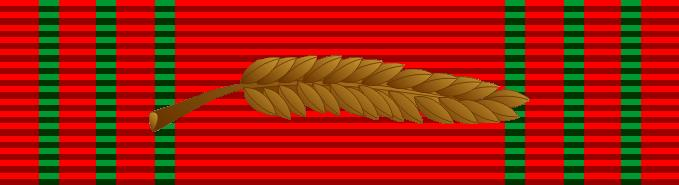

== Bibliography ==
- Taaffe, Stephen R. (2013). Marshall and His Generals: U.S. Army Commanders in World War II. Lawrence, Kansas: University Press of Kansas. ISBN 978-0-7006-1942-9. OCLC 840162019.

Military offices
Preceded by Eugene M. Landrum	Commanding General 90th Infantry Division; August–October 1944	Succeeded by James Van Fleet
Preceded by Charles H. Corlett	Commanding General XIX Corps; 1944–1945	Succeeded by Post deactivated
