= XXII Corps (United States) =

- Shoulder sleeve insignia of XXII Corps
- Active: 9 January 1944–20 January 1946; 5 January 1966–3 May 1971
- Country: United States of America
- Branch: United States Army
- Role: Headquarters
- Size: Corps
- Engagements: World War II; Rhineland; Central Europe; Vietnam; Counteroffensive; Counteroffensive, Phase II; Counteroffensive, Phase Ill; Tet Counteroffensive; Counteroffensive, Phase lV; Counteroffensive, Phase V; Counteroffensive, Phase VI; Tet 69/Counteroffensive; Summer- Fall 1969; Winter- Spring 1970; Counteroffensive, Phase VII
- Decorations: Meritorious Unit Commendation 1966-1967; Meritorious Unit Commendation 1967-1969; Meritorious Unit Commendation 1969; Meritorious Unit Commendation 1969-1971; Republic of Vietnam Cross of Gallantry with Palm; Republic of Vietnam Civil Action Honor Medal, First Class

Commanders
- Notable commanders: Ernest N. Harmon

Insignia
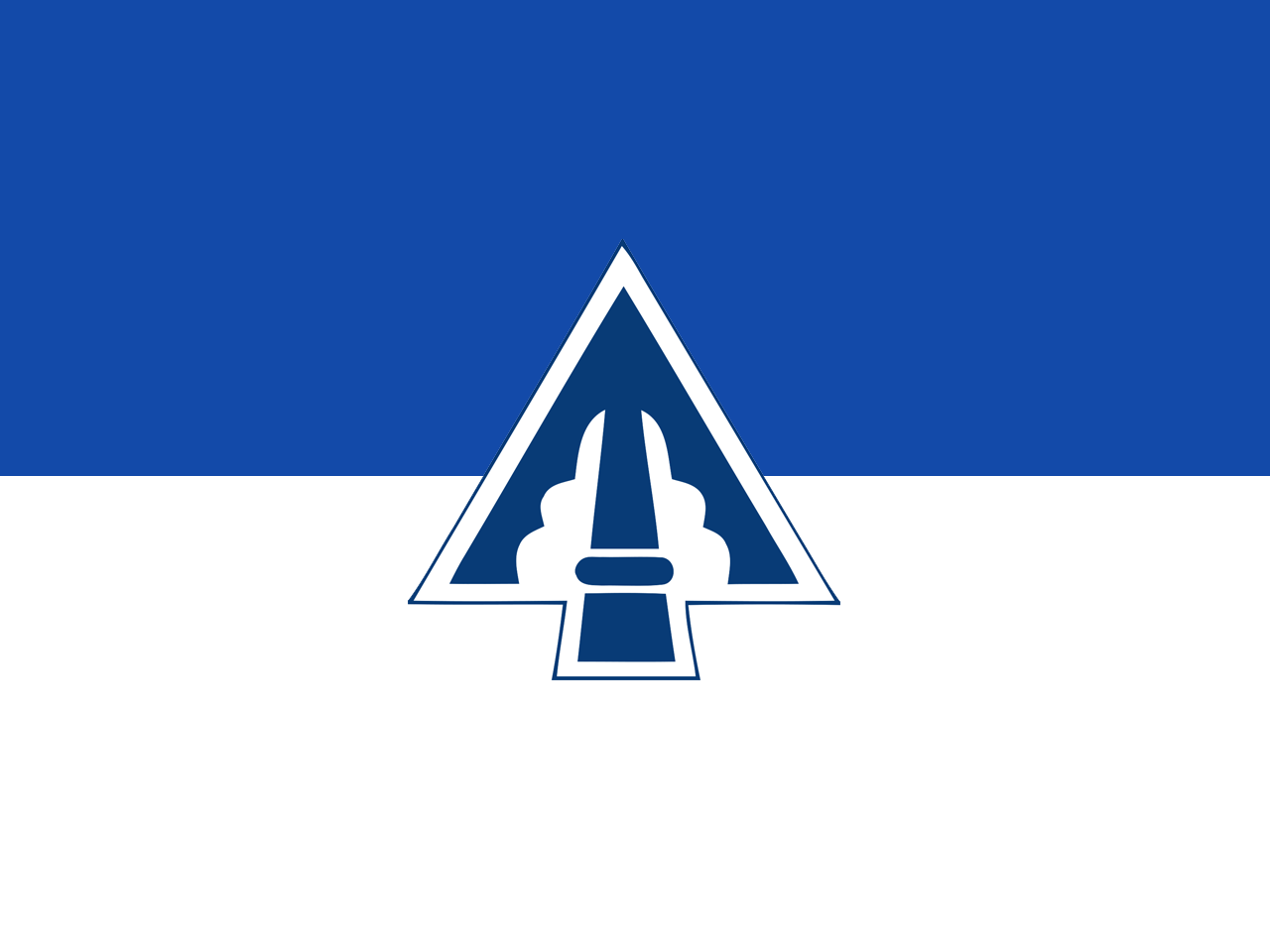
- XXII Corps Flag

The XXII Corps was a corps of the United States Army during World War II and the Cold War. Its lineage was assigned to II Field Force, Vietnam, during the Vietnam War.

== Lineage ==
Constituted 9 January 1944 in the Army of the United States as Headquarters and Headquarters Company, XXII Corps. Activated 15 January 1944 at Fort Campbell, Kentucky. Inactivated 20 January 1946 in Germany. Allotted 12 July 1950 to the Regular Army. Redesignated 5 January 1966 as Headquarters and Headquarters Company, II Field Force. Activated 10 January 1966 at Fort Hood, Texas. Redesignated 15 March 1966 as Headquarters and Headquarters Company, II Field Force, Vietnam. Inactivated 3 May 1971 at Fort Hood, Texas. Redesignated 2 September 1982 as Headquarters and Headquarters Company, XXII Corps.

== Commanders ==
- Major General Henry Terrell, Jr. (15 January 1944 – November 1944)
- Major General Ernest N. Harmon (23 January 1945 – 10 January 1946)

=== Chiefs of Staff ===
- Brigadier General Charles Herbert Karlstad (1944−1945)
- Colonel Samuel Tankersley Williams (February 1945−January 1946)

== Campaign participation ==
=== World War II ===
- Rhineland
- Central Europe

=== Vietnam ===
- Counteroffensive
- Counteroffensive, Phase II
- Counteroffensive, Phase III
- Tet Counteroffensive
- Counteroffensive, Phase IV
- Counteroffensive, Phase V
- Counteroffensive, Phase VI
- Tet 69/Counteroffensive
- Summer-Fall 1969
- Winter-Spring 1970
- Counteroffensive, Phase VII

== Bibliography ==
- Wilson, John B., compiler (1999). "Armies, Corps, Divisions, and Separate Brigades". Washington, D.C.: Government Printing Office. ISBN 0-16-049994-1
