= Jay W. MacKelvie =

United States Army brigadier general

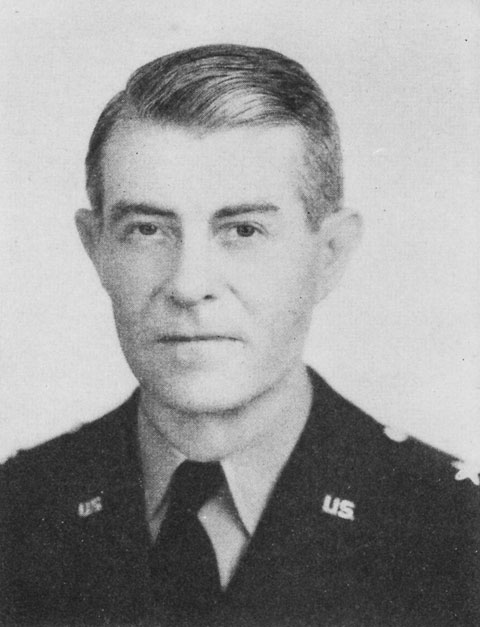
- Born: September 23, 1890; Kingsbury County, South Dakota, United States
- Died: December 5, 1985 (aged 95); Denver, Colorado, United States
- Burial place: Arlington National Cemetery, Virginia, United States
- Military career
- Allegiance: United States
- Branch: United States Army
- Service years: 1913–1946
- Rank: Brigadier General
- Units: Cavalry Branch; Field Artillery Branch
- Commands: 85th Division Artillery; 7th Division Artillery; XII Corps Artillery; 90th Infantry Division; 80th Division Artillery; V Corps Artillery
- Conflicts: World War I World War II
- Awards: Legion of Merit; Bronze Star (2); Purple Heart; Legion of Honour (France); Croix de Guerre with Palm (France); Order of the Patriotic War Second Class (Union of Soviet Socialist Republics)

Jay W. MacKelvie (September 23, 1890 – December 5, 1985) was a career United States Army officer. He attained the rank of brigadier general was prominent during World War II for being relieved of his command of the 90th Infantry Division shortly after the Normandy landings.

== Early life and start of career ==
Jay Ward MacKelvie was born in Esmond, Kingsbury County, South Dakota on September 23, 1890. His birth name was Joseph Ward McKelvie and he was one of several children born to Francis McKelvie and Janette Gibb (Bainbridge) McKelvie. He was usually addressed by his middle name, and over time modified his first name to the initial J., and later to the name Jay. In addition, he later altered the spelling of his last name from McKelvie to MacKelvie, its original Scottish spelling.

Following the 1891 death of his father, MacKelvie's mother moved her family to Illinois to live closer to their relatives. In 1908, MacKelvie graduated from Galesburg High School in Galesburg, Illinois. He then joined an older brother in Butte, Montana, where he worked at a smelter for the Anaconda Copper Mine. He later worked on construction of the Butte, Anaconda and Pacific Railway, a position he left in order to join the military.

== Early military career ==
MacKelvie enlisted in the United States Army in 1913, and was assigned to the 7th Cavalry Regiment. By 1915 he had risen to the non-commissioned officer (NCO) ranks. MacKelvie advanced to regimental sergeant major before receiving his commission as a second lieutenant in 1917.

== World War I ==
Originally assigned to the Cavalry Branch, MacKelvie later transferred to the Field Artillery Branch. He joined the 78th Field Artillery Regiment for World War I, and took part in the St. Mihiel Offensive in 1918.

== Post-World War I ==
He remained in the service after World War I and in the subsequent interwar period, receiving promotion to first lieutenant in 1917, temporary Captain from 1917 to 1919, permanent captain in 1920, major in 1933, and lieutenant colonel in 1940. In the 1920s, he served as a member of the 82nd Field Artillery Battalion (Horse), a unit of the 1st Cavalry Division. MacKelvie completed the Field Artillery Battery Officers' Course in 1923, the U.S. Army Command and General Staff School in 1932, and the U.S. Army War College in 1936. On July 1, 1940, while the United States was preparing for World War II, he was promoted to lieutenant colonel. He was promoted again, this time to the temporary rank of colonel, on December 11, 1941, shortly after the United States entered World War II.

== World War II ==
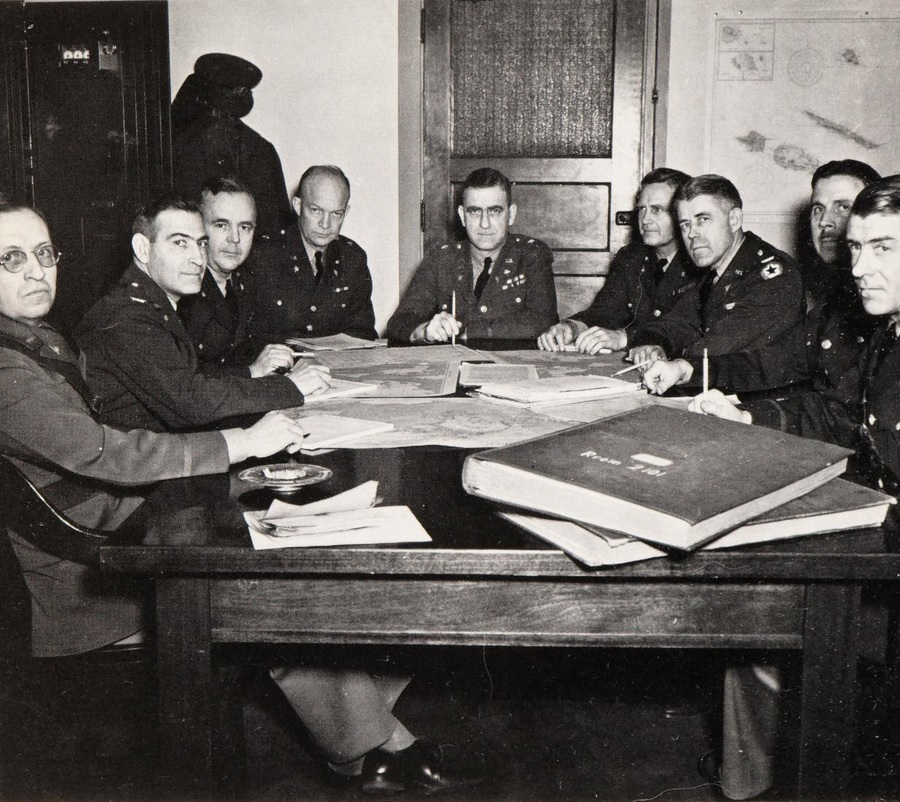
The meeting of War Plans Division, War Department General Staff in 1942. From left to right: Harrison, Lee S. Gerow, Crawford, Eisenhower, Leonard T. Gerow, Handy, Sherrill, McKee and MacKelvie.

After service in the War Department's Plans Division at the start of World War II brought him to the attention of General George C. Marshall, the Army Chief of Staff, in March 1942 he was promoted to the temporary rank of brigadier general and named commander of the 85th Division Artillery. He served until 1943, when he was appointed commander of the 7th Division Artillery. From 1943 to 1944 MacKelvie commanded the XII Corps Artillery.

MacKelvie was named commander of the 90th Infantry Division in 1944 and participated in the invasion of Normandy. He was not considered a competent commander: during one engagement, Samuel Tankersley Williams reportedly found MacKelvie hiding from enemy fire in a drainage ditch. Shortly after the invasion, the VII Corps commander, Major General Joseph Lawton Collins decided that the division was not performing satisfactorily in combat. As a result, he relieved MacKelvie and two of the division's regimental commanders. Collins recalled inspecting MacKelvie's division and finding almost no activity: "We could locate no regimental or battalion headquarters. No shelling was going on, nor any fighting that we could observe."

MacKelvie had been nominated for promotion to temporary major general while in command of the 90th Division, but after his relief, the nomination was withdrawn. MacKelvie's relief was without prejudice, and Collins made it clear that he thought MacKelvie was capable of continuing to exercise command, especially of artillery units. MacKelvie was subsequently assigned to command the 80th Division Artillery in place of Brigadier General Edmund Wilson Searby (who had been killed in action), serving until 1945.

From 1945 until his 1946 retirement, MacKelvie served as commander of the V Corps Artillery.

== Awards and decorations ==
MacKelvie's awards and decorations included: Legion of Merit, two awards of the Bronze Star Medal; Purple Heart; Legion of Honor and Croix de Guerre with Palm (France); and the Order of the Patriotic War Second Class (USSR).

== Later career ==
After retiring from the military, MacKelvie resided in Battle Creek, Michigan. In the 1950s and 1960s he was a civil defense consultant, chairman of Battle Creek's Civil Defense Advisory Council, and a member of Michigan's Civil Defense Advisory Council. MacKelvie was a member of the Calhoun County Board of Social Welfare, and was also involved in several civic projects, including the creation of the Hart–Dole–Inouye Federal Center and serving as vice president and president of the board of directors for the Battle Creek Civic Art Center. In 1964 his wife and he relocated to Denver, Colorado so they could live closer to their son Philip's family.

== Death and burial ==
MacKelvie died in Denver, Colorado on December 5, 1985. He was buried at Arlington National Cemetery, Section 59 Lot 432.

== Family ==
In 1924, MacKelvie was married to Ethel Leonard (1896–1985) of Battle Creek. They were the parents of two sons, Jay W. MacKelvie Jr. and Philip A. MacKelvie.

Military offices
Preceded by Henry Terrell Jr.	Commanding General 90th Infantry Division; January 1944 – July 1944	Succeeded by Eugene M. Landrum
