= Ernest N. Harmon =

United States Army general (1894–1979)

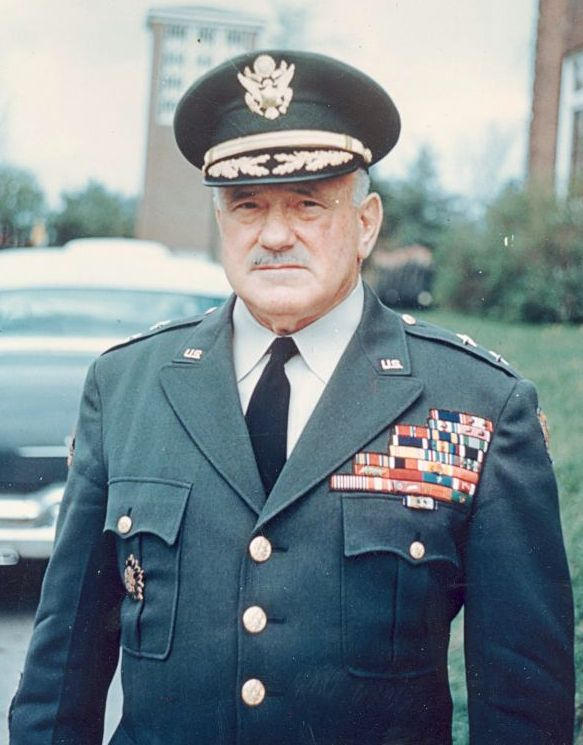
- Born: February 26, 1894; Lowell, Massachusetts, United States
- Died: November 13, 1979 (aged 85); White River Junction, Vermont, United States
- Military career
- Allegiance: United States
- Branch: United States Army
- Service years: 1917–1948
- Rank: Major General
- Nickname: "Old Gravel Voice"
- Service number: 0-5282
- Unit: Cavalry Branch
- Commands: United States Third Army; XXII Corps; 2nd Armored Division; 1st Armored Division
- Conflicts: World War I World War II
- Awards: Distinguished Service Cross; Army Distinguished Service Medal (4); Silver Star (2); Legion of Merit (3); Bronze Star Medal; Purple Heart

Major General Ernest Nason Harmon (February 26, 1894 – November 13, 1979) was a senior officer of the United States Army. He served in both World War I and World War II, and is best known for his actions in reorganizing the 1st Armored Division after the debacle in February 1943 at the Battle of Kasserine Pass during the Tunisian campaign. From January 1945, through the end of World War II, Harmon commanded XXII Corps (United States).

== Early life ==
Ernest Nason Harmon was born in Lowell, Massachusetts, the son of Ernest and Junietta (Spaulding) Harmon. He was orphaned at age ten, and was raised by relatives in the Newbury, Vermont village of West Newbury. He was educated in West Newbury and graduated from the Bradford Academy in 1912. He attended Norwich University for a year, and then, in 1913, received an appointment to the United States Military Academy (USMA) at West Point, New York. While there, he rode horses, played football and hockey, and was a member of the boxing team.

Following his graduation on April 20, 1917, exactly two weeks after the American entry into World War I, he was commissioned as a second lieutenant in the Cavalry Branch of the United States Army, graduating 76 in a class of 139. In August 1917 Harmon married M. Leona Tuxbury: they had two daughters, Barbara Roll and Jeanne Oliver, and three sons, Halsey, Robert and Ernest Jr.

== World War I ==
Harmon was assigned to the 2nd Cavalry Regiment at Fort Ethan Allen, which was followed by duty at Fort Devens, Massachusetts, and Fort Sill, Oklahoma.

In March 1918, Harmon went to France with F Troop, 2nd Cavalry. B, D, F, and H Troops of the 2nd Cavalry became the last horse-mounted U.S. Cavalry units to ever engage an enemy in combat. Harmon served in the Baccarat Sector, at Camp du Valdahon, the St. Mihiel Offensive, and the Meuse-Argonne Offensive. He served in France and Belgium after the war, and returned to the U.S. in June 1919 to become a student at the Fort Riley, Kansas Cavalry School.

== Between the wars ==
In August 1921, Harmon was assigned to West Point as an instructor in Mechanical Drawing, and his additional duties included backfield coach for the football team, and coach of the school's first lacrosse team. In the summer of 1924 he went to France with three other officers to compete in the modern pentathlon in that year's summer Olympic Games. Harmon placed fifth in shooting, 37th in swimming, 27th in fencing, 32nd in equestrian, and 26th in the cross country run. He finished tied for 31st overall (out of 38 contestants), and athletes from Sweden claimed the first three places.

Harmon's subsequent assignments included the 6th Cavalry Regiment at Fort Oglethorpe, Georgia, and four years as Professor of Military Science and Commandant of Cadets at Norwich University. In 1933, after being promoted to major in November 1932, Harmon graduated from the United States Army Command and General Staff College, and he was a 1934 graduate of the United States Army War College. He then commanded a squadron of the 8th Cavalry Regiment at Fort Bliss, which was followed by four years in the logistics staff directorate (G4) on the War Department General Staff. Harmon was briefly assistant chief of staff for I Armored Corps at Fort Knox, Kentucky, and was then assigned to serve as chief of staff to Adna R. Chaffee Jr. during Chaffee's command of the U.S. Army's newly organized Armored Force. On July 1, 1940, he was promoted to lieutenant colonel and then again to colonel in the Army of the United States (AUS) on November 4, 1941.

== World War II ==
The United States entered World War II shortly after Harmon's promotion in December 1941, after the Japanese attack on Pearl Harbor. For seven months, from July 1942 until February 1943, Harmon commanded the 2nd Armored Division and trained the division for eventual overseas service. During this time he was promoted twice, to brigadier general (AUS) on March 13, 1942, and to major general barely five months later, on August 9.

=== North Africa ===
Elements of the 2nd Armored Division began to arrive in Algeria, French North Africa, in November 1942, as part of Operation Torch. Upon landing in Algiers, Harmon was delegated by General Dwight D. "Ike" Eisenhower, the Supreme Allied Commander in North Africa, to travel to the front to report on the deteriorating Allied situation in Tunisia and Algeria, and to assist where needed. His on-site reporting and interventions during the Kasserine Pass battles in February 1943 helped stabilize and reorganize the U.S. II Corps, which had been thrown into disorder after the initial German attack.

During the fighting, Harmon had opportunity to observe Major General Lloyd Fredendall, commander of II Corps, as well as his superior, the British Lieutenant General Kenneth Anderson, commander of the British First Army. Anderson was in overall control of the Allied front in eastern Algeria, commanding British, American, and French forces. Harmon noticed that the two generals rarely saw each other, and failed to properly coordinate and integrate forces under their command. Fredendall was barely on speaking terms with his 1st Armored Division commander, Major General Orlando Ward, who had repeatedly complained to his superiors of the dangers of separating his division into weaker combat commands for use in various sectors of the front. Harmon also noticed that Fredendall rarely left his command headquarters, a huge fortified bunker constructed a full 70 miles behind the front lines (the bunker took two hundred U.S. Army engineers three weeks to excavate, using hundreds of pounds of explosive to blast rooms out of solid rock). Allied forces were bereft of air support during critical attacks, and were frequently positioned by the senior command in positions where they could not offer mutual support to each other. Subordinates would later recall their utter confusion at being handed conflicting orders, not knowing which general to obey–Anderson, or Fredendall. While interviewing field commanders, Harmon received an earful of criticism over what many Allied officers viewed as a cowardly, confused, and out-of-touch command. Noting that Fredendall seemed out-of-touch (and, at one point, intoxicated), he requested and received permission to go to the front and intervene where necessary to shore up Allied defenses.

While Harmon attributed the lion's share of the blame for the reversal to Fredendall, he also began to question Anderson's leadership abilities with respect to a large command. Anderson was partly to blame for the weakness of II Corps in southern area of the front. When Fredendall asked to retire to a defensible line after the initial assault in order to regroup his forces, Anderson rejected the request, allowing German panzer forces to overrun many of the American positions in the south. Anderson also weakened II Corps by parceling out portions of the 1st Armored Division into various combat commands sent to other sectors over the vehement objections of its commander, Major General Ward.

Major General Harmon had been in Thala on the Algerian border, witnessing the stubborn resistance of the British Nickforce, which held the vital road leading into the Kasserine Pass against the heavy pressure of the German 10th Panzer Division, which was under Rommel's direct command. Commanding the British Nickforce was Brigadier Cameron Nicholson, an effective combat leader who kept his remaining forces steady under relentless German hammering. When the U.S. 9th Infantry Division's attached artillery arrived in Thala after a four-day, 800-mile march, it seemed like a godsend to Harmon. Inexplicably, the 9th was ordered by Anderson to abandon Thala to the enemy and head for the village of Le Kef, 50 miles away, to defend against an expected German attack. Nicholson pleaded with the American artillery commander, Brigadier General Stafford LeRoy Irwin, to ignore Anderson's order and stay. Harmon agreed with Nicholson and commanded, "Irwin, you stay right here!" The 9th's artillery stayed, and with its 48 guns raining a whole year's worth of a (peacetime) allotment of shells, stopped the advancing Germans in their tracks. Unable to retreat under the withering fire, the Afrika Korps finally withdrew after dark. With the defeat at Thala, Generalfeldmarschall Erwin Rommel decided to end his offensive.

After Rommel had finally been halted at Thala, Harmon returned to Fredendall's headquarters and was incredulous to find Fredendall expecting to pick up where he had left off. Harmon's reports on Fredendall's conduct during and after the battle (in an interview with Major General George S. Patton, Fredendall's replacement, Harmon called Fredendall "cowardly") played a key role in Fredendall's removal from command of II Corps and reassignment to a training command in the United States. Offered the command of II Corps in Fredendall's place, Harmon declined, as it would appear to others that Harmon was motivated by personal gain. Instead, in March, General Eisenhower appointed Patton, a colleague and friend of Harmon's, to replace Fredendall. Harmon later accepted command of the 1st Armored Division after the relief of Major General Ward in April.

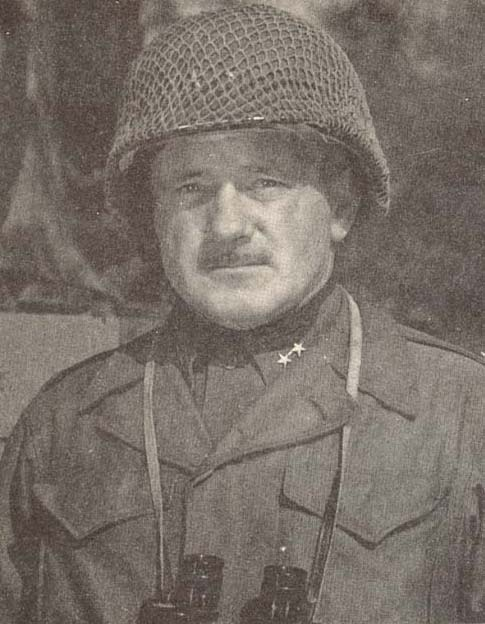
Major General Ernest N. Harmon, pictured here sometime in 1944.

Harmon led the 1st Armored Division throughout the rest of the Tunisian campaign, which eventually came to an end in mid-May 1943, with the surrender of almost 250,000 German and Italian soldiers, who subsequently became prisoners of war (POWs).

=== Italy ===
The division did not participate in the Allied invasion of Sicily (Operation Husky), although his old command, the 2nd Armored Division, now led by Major General Hugh Gaffey, did.

Harmon went on to lead the 1st Armored Division in the Italian Campaign, leading the division in terrain unsuitable for the employment of armor, until July 1944 when he returned to the United States. During the Italian campaign he and his division played a significant role in the Battle of Anzio.

=== Western Europe ===
On 12 September 1944, Harmon returned to command his old division, the 2nd Armored, in succession to Major General Edward H. Brooks, who was promoted to command VI Corps. Harmon led the division on the Western Front, which played a large role in the Battle of the Bulge at the end of 1944. Harmon then assumed command of the XXII Corps, on 14 January 1945, and led the corps in the final stages of the war, participating in the Western Allied invasion of Germany. The end of World War II in Europe came soon after, on May 8, 1945, Victory in Europe Day.

During World War II, Harmon participated in a total of nine campaigns – two in North Africa, three in Italy, and four in France and Germany.

== Post war ==
Harmon remained in command of XXII Corps until it was deactivated in January 1946, shortly after his permanent rank was promoted from lieutenant colonel to colonel on December 28, 1945, when he took command of VI Corps. He helped organize the initial post-war government of Allied-occupied Germany, including the organization of the U.S. Constabulary, which was formed from the units of VI Corps. As commander of the Constabulary, Harmon harshly criticized the inclusion of African-American soldiers in the occupation of Germany, stating publicly in 1947 that the deployment of African American soldiers to Europe had been "America's stupidest mistake." According to a future historian who served under him, Harmon had referred to Black soldiers to his troops as "jigaboos" and "had warned the government not to send any Niggers. Now they were a bigger problem than the Germans."

He was interim commander of the Third Army from January to March 1947. He then served as deputy commander of Army Ground Forces before retiring from the U.S. Army in 1948, after a military career spanning over three decades and service in two world wars, with the permanent rank of major general,.

Harmon left the army for Norwich University, where he served as president from 1950 to 1965. In 1955, he received an Honorary Doctorate of Law from Saint Michael's College, Colchester, Vermont. Harmon died at White River Junction, Vermont, on November 13, 1979, at the age of 85.

== Orders, decorations, and medals ==
Major General Harmon's ribbon bar:

United States decorations and medals

- Distinguished Service Cross
- Army Distinguished Service Medal with three oak leaf clusters
- Silver Star with oak leaf cluster
- Legion of Merit with two oak leaf clusters
- Bronze Star
- Air Medal
- Army Commendation Medal
- Purple Heart
- World War I Victory Medal with three campaign clasps
- Army of Occupation of Germany Medal
- American Defense Service Medal
- American Campaign Medal
- European-African-Middle Eastern Campaign Medal with nine campaign stars
- World War II Victory Medal
- Army of Occupation Medal

Foreign orders

- Grand Officer of the Order of Orange-Nassau with Swords (Netherlands)
- Grand Officer of the Order of Ouissam Alaouite (Morocco)
- Military Order of the White Lion, 2nd Class (Czechoslovakia)
- Honorary Companion of the Order of the Bath (United Kingdom)
- Commander of the Order of Leopold (Belgium)
- Order of Saints Maurice and Lazarus (Italy)
- Officier of the Legion of Honour (France)
- Order of the Red Banner (Union of Soviet Socialist Republics)

Foreign decorations

- Croix de Guerre 1939–1945 with palm (France)
- Belgian Croix de Guerre 1940–1945 (Belgium)
- Fourragère (Belgium)
- Silver Medal of Military Valor (Italy)
- Czechoslovak War Cross 1939-1945

== Promotions ==
Insignia	Rank	Component	Date
No insignia	Cadet	United States Military Academy	June 14, 1913
	Second lieutenant	Regular Army	April 20, 1917
	First lieutenant	Regular Army	May 15, 1917
	Captain	Temporary	August 5, 1917
	First lieutenant	Regular Army	October 3, 1919
	Captain	Regular Army	April 26, 1920
	Major	Regular Army	November 1, 1932
	Lieutenant colonel	Regular Army	July 1, 1940
	Colonel	Army of the United States	November 4, 1941
	Brigadier general	Army of the United States	March 13, 1942
	Major general	Army of the United States	August 9, 1942
	Colonel	Regular Army	April 28, 1945
	Major general	Retired list	March 31, 1948

== Bibliography ==
- B. Dale, Matthew (2014). Professional Military Development Of Major General Ernest N. Harmon. Pickle Partners Publishing. ISBN 9781782897248.
- Taaffe, Stephen R. (2013). Marshall and His Generals: U.S. Army Commanders in World War II. Lawrence, Kansas: University Press of Kansas. ISBN 978-0-7006-1942-9. OCLC 840162019.

Military offices
Preceded by Willis D. Crittenberger	Commanding General 2nd Armored Division; 1942–1943	Succeeded by Hugh J. Gaffey
Preceded by Orlando Ward	Commanding General 1st Armored Division; 1943–1944	Succeeded by Vernon Prichard
Preceded by Edward H. Brooks	Commanding General 2nd Armored Division; 1944–1945	Succeeded by Isaac D. White
Preceded by Henry Terrell Jr.	Commanding General XXII Corps; 1945–1946	Post deactivated
Preceded by Geoffrey Keyes	Commanding General Third Army; January–March 1947	Succeeded by Oscar Griswold
