= Stewart Van Vliet =

US Army brevet major general

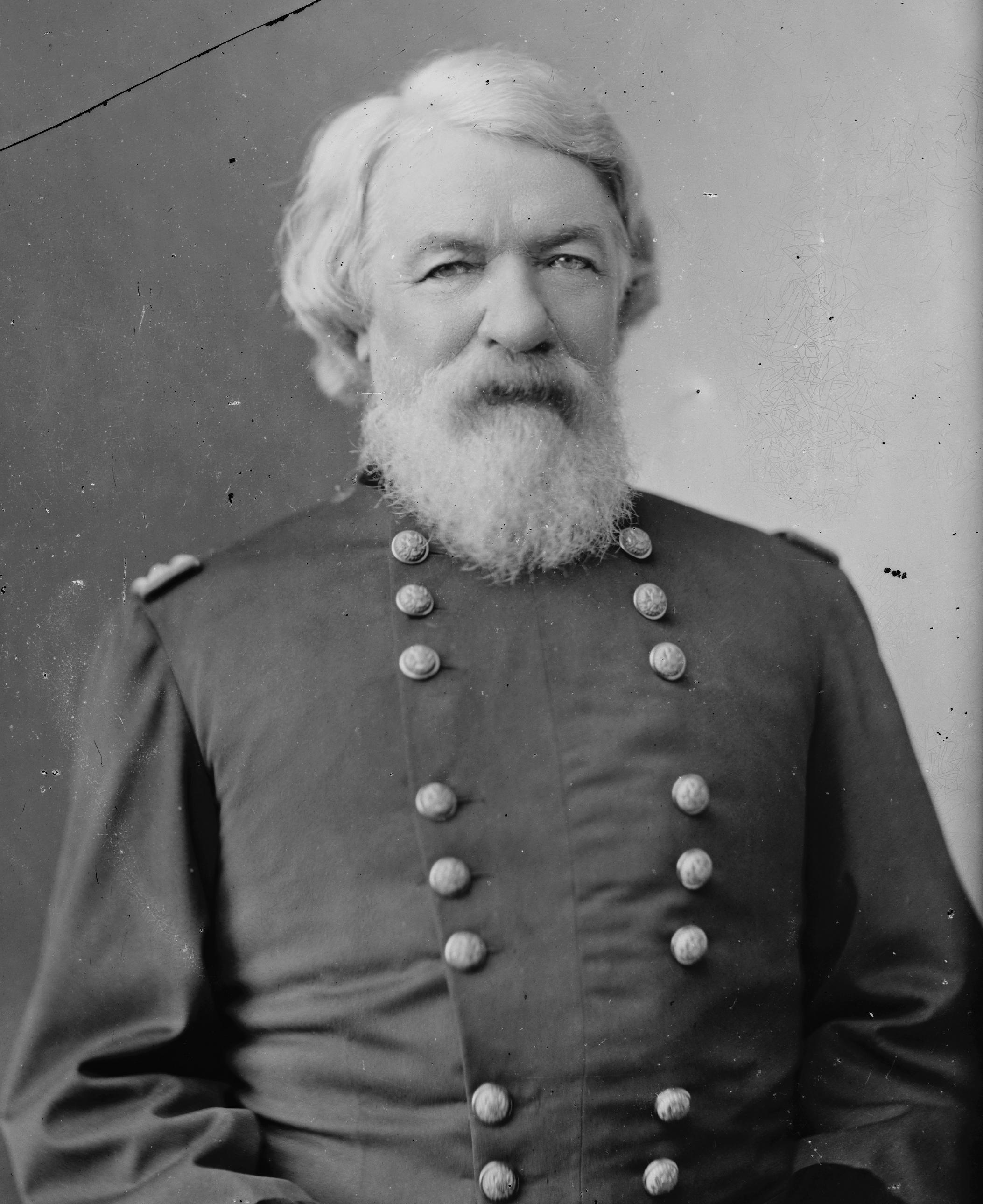
- Stewart Van Vliet
- Born: July 21, 1815; Ferrisburg, Vermont
- Died: March 28, 1901 (aged 85); Washington, D.C.
- Burial place: Arlington National Cemetery
- Spouse: Sarah Jane Brown
- Children: Robert Campbell Van Vliet
- Relatives: Rachel Hough (mother); Christian Van Vliet (father); John H. Van Vliet (grandson)
- Military career
- Allegiance: United States of America; Union
- Branch: United States Army; Union Army
- Service years: 1840–1881
- Rank: Brigadier General; Brevet Major General
- Conflicts: Second Seminole War; Mexican–American War; Utah War; American Civil War

Stewart Leonard Van Vliet (July 21, 1815 – March 28, 1901), was a United States Army officer who fought on the side of the Union during the American Civil War.

== Early life ==
Van Vliet was born in Ferrisburg, Vermont, the son of Rachel Hough and Christian Van Vliet. He grew up and was educated in Fishkill, New York.

He entered the United States Military Academy in 1836, graduating in 1840, 9th in a class of 42. Among the members of his class were several future Civil War generals: Paul Octave Hebert (1/CSA), William Tecumseh Sherman (6/USA), John P. McCown (10/CSA), George Henry Thomas (12/USA), Richard S. Ewell (13/CSA), James Green Martin (14/CSA), George W. Getty (15/USA), William Hays (18/USA), Bushrod Johnson (23/CSA), William Steele (31/CSA), and Thomas Jordan (41/CSA).

Van Vliet was attached in the U.S. 3rd Artillery during the Seminole Wars, seeing action in several engagements, "in one of which he killed an Indian chief in a hand to hand fight."

He served in the Mexican–American War with General Zachary Taylor at the Battle of Monterrey, and under General Winfield Scott at the Siege of Veracruz. After the war, he was stationed in Kansas, helping build forts along the Platte River.

He was married at Fort Laramie, March 6, 1851, to Sarah Jane Brown, the daughter of Major Jacob Brown. In September 1855, he served in the Sioux Expedition under Col. William S. Harney, and in 1857, with Col. Albert Sidney Johnston in the Utah War against the Mormons.

His obituary provides the following rendition of his participation in that expedition: "He fitted out Gen. Albert Sidney Johnston's expedition against the Mormons, who were in open revolt against the United States, and after it started was ordered to go on ahead and communicate with Brigham Young. He made a rapid thousand-mile drive from Leavenworth to Salt Lake City, traveling with his escort of thirty soldiers, in light wagons. On approaching Utah several travelers urged him to turn back, as the Mormons had threatened his life. He was so much impressed by these warnings that he left his little force 150 miles from Salt Lake City, in order not to endanger their lives, and rode into the Mormon stronghold alone. He was treated courteously, and the trouble was settled without bloodshed."

== Civil War ==
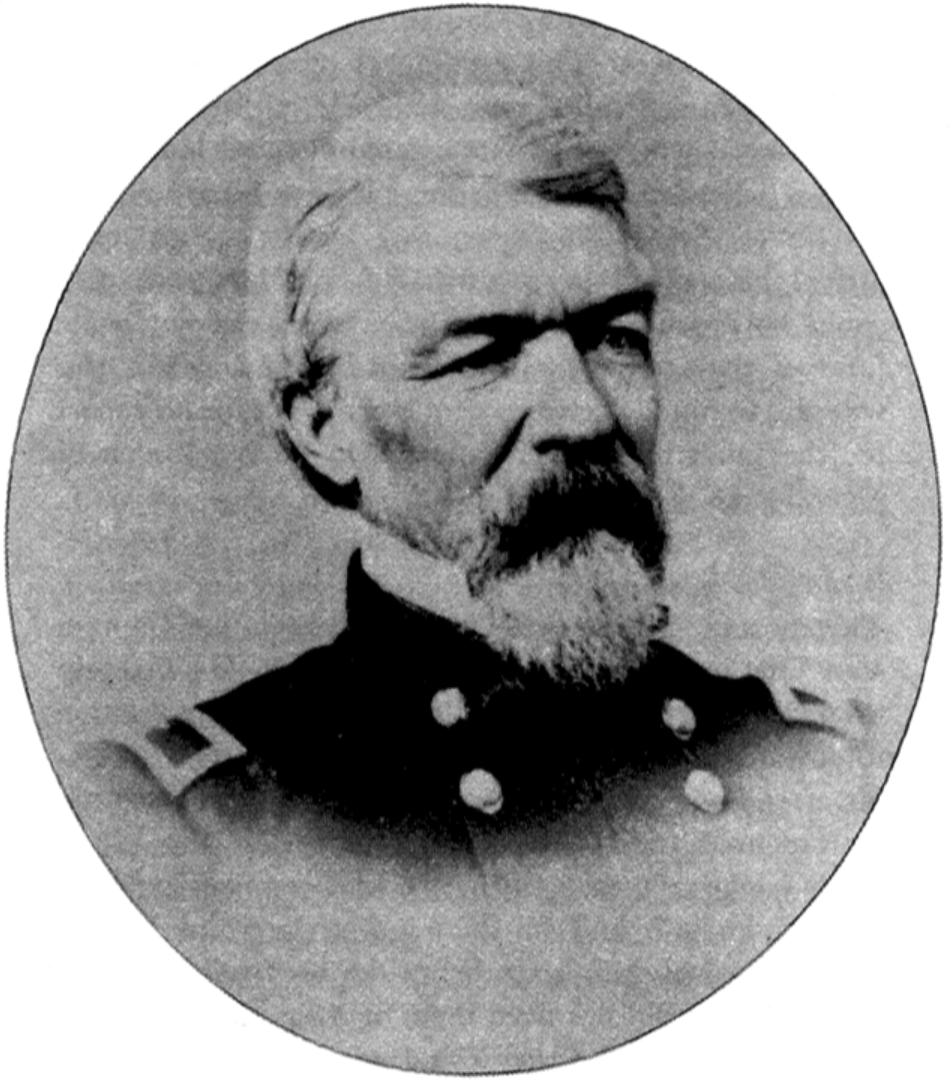
General Stewart Van Vliet

Van Vliet was promoted to major on August 3, 1861, and brigadier general, Volunteers, on September 23, 1861. During the Civil War, he was chief quartermaster of the Army of the Potomac from August 1861 until July 10, 1862. His appointment to brigadier general expired a week later, and he was stationed in New York City for the remainder of the war, coordinating supplies and transportation for troops in the field. In October 1864, he received brevet promotions to lieutenant colonel, colonel and brigadier general, U.S. Army, and major general in the U.S. Army and Volunteers. He was again promoted to brigadier general, Volunteers on March 13, 1865.

== Later life ==
After the war, he remained in the Regular Army until 1881, when he retired as Assistant Quartermaster General of the U.S. Army. His last assignment was on the Retiring Board, starting in 1879. He stayed in Washington, D.C., after he retired, and died there on March 28, 1901. He is buried in Arlington National Cemetery.

General Van Vliet was a member of the Aztec Club of 1847, over which he presided from 1893 to 1894, the Holland Society, the St. Nicholas Society, the Loyal Legion and the Grand Army of the Republic.

== See also ==
- List of American Civil War generals (Union)
- Vermont in the Civil War
