= 358th Infantry Regiment =

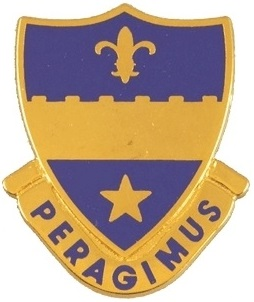
- Distinctive unit insignia of the 358th Infantry Regiment
- Active: 1917-1919 National Army; 1921-1942 Organized Reserves; 1942-1945 (Army of the United States); 1947-1999 (Army Reserve); 1999-present (Regular Army)
- Country: United States
- Branch: United States Army; Army of the United States
- Type: Infantry
- Motto: Peragimus ("We Accomplish")
- Engagements: World War I World War II; Global war on terrorism

Commanders
- Notable commanders: William L. Nave; Christian H. Clarke Jr. James O. Boswell

The 358th Infantry Regiment is a unit of the United States Army. Organized in 1917, it took part in both World War I and World War II as a subordinate unit of the 90th Infantry Division.

== World War I ==
The 358th Infantry Regiment was constituted on August 5, 1917, as a unit of the National Army. Part of the 90th Division, it organized and trained at Camp Travis, Fort Sam Houston, Texas before departing for combat in France.

After arriving in Europe, the 358th Infantry took part in the St. Mihiel, Meuse-Argonne, and Lorraine 1918 campaigns. It remained on occupation duty after the war, then returned to the United States. The regiment was demobilized at Camp Pike, Arkansas on June 22, 1919.

Terry de la Mesa Allen Sr., who later commanded the 1st Infantry Division from 1942 to 1943, commanded the 3rd Battalion of this regiment in 1918.

== Post-World War I ==
When the Army reorganized after World War I, the 358th Infantry was reconstituted on June 24, 1921. Assigned to the Organized Reserves as a unit of the 90th Division, it was organized in November 1921 with its Headquarters in Fort Worth, Texas. Subordinate battalion headquarters were concurrently organized as follows: 1st Battalion at Fort Worth; 2nd Battalion at Waco, Texas; and 3rd Battalion at Amarillo, Texas. Regimental units were relocated on 15 April 1925 as follows: 1st Battalion to Weatherford, Texas; 2nd Battalion to Decatur, Texas; and 3rd Battalion to Cleburne, Texas. The regiment typically conducted inactive training period meetings at the Hotel Texas in Fort Worth, and summer training with the 9th and 23rd Infantry Regiments at Fort Sam Houston or Camp Bullis, Texas, but sometimes also conducted infantry Citizens Military Training Camps at Fort Sam Houston or Camp Bullis as an alternate form of summer training. "Contact camps" were held as another alternate form of summer training at John Tarleton Agricultural College in Stephenville, Texas, during the fall or winter months. The primary ROTC "feeder" schools for new Reserve lieutenants for the regiment were North Texas Agricultural College and John Tarleton Agricultural College.

== World War II ==
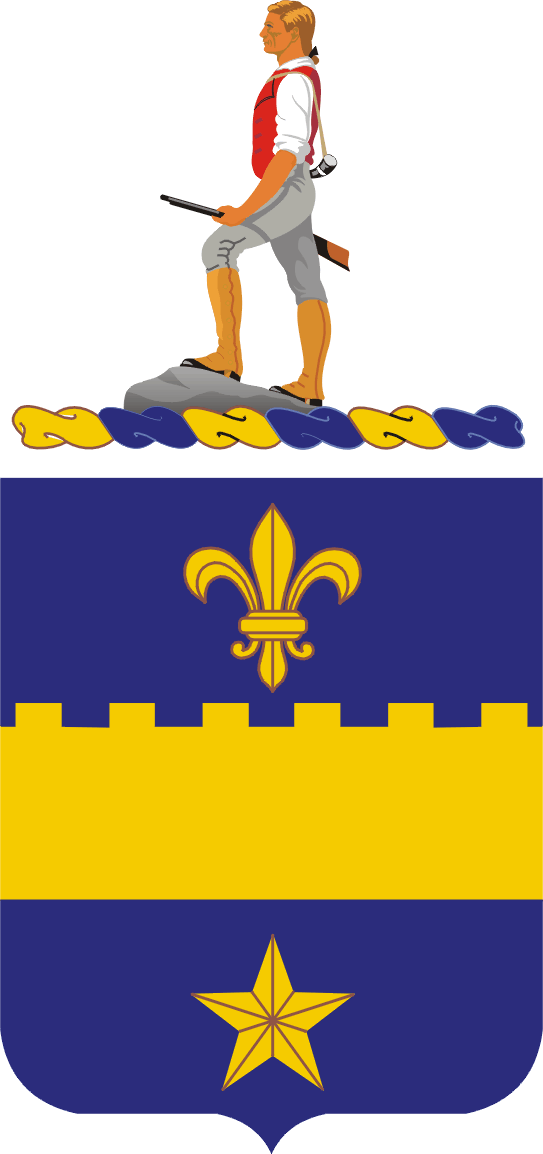
358th Regiment coat of arms

The 358th Infantry was ordered to active military service on March 25, 1942. It was organized and completed its training at Camp Barkeley, Texas.

After arrival in France, the 358th Infantry took part in combat throughout 1944 and 1945 as part of the 90th Infantry Division. The regiment's campaign participation credit included Normandy, Northern France, Rhineland, Ardennes-Alsace, and Central Europe. The 358th Infantry was demobilized at Camp Myles Standish, Massachusetts on December 26, 1945.

=== Normandy ===
After four days at sea, the regiment arrived on Utah beach on the 8th of June. By the 10th they had moved into the peninsula near Picauville, and experienced 'Hell on Earth' under heavy artillery.

Between the 8th and 12 July, they took the area of Mont Castre (fr) with heavy losses, the 3rd battalion alone losing nearly three quarters of its riflemen and officers.

At the end of July the Regiment attacked the heavily fortified island in the Seves river near Saint-Germain-sur-Seves, again with heavy losses.

The regiment then moved south, liberating Saint Hilaire, Louvigné and Landivy. A march of three days in intense heat took them across Mayenne to Sainte Suzanne. From there they went to near Chambois (via Le Mans and Alençon) to help close the Falaise Pocket.

== Post-World War II ==
When the Army reorganized following the war, the 358th Infantry was activated in the Organized Reserve on January 30, 1947, with its headquarters in Fort Worth, Texas. The headquarters moved to College Station, Texas on January 31, 1955, and to Bryan, Texas on November 3, 1958.

Under the Army's 1957 reorganization, on April 1, 1959, the 358th Infantry Regiment was reorganized and redesignated as 1st Battle Group, 358th Infantry, 90th Infantry Division. On March 15, 1963, the unit was again reorganized as 1st and 2nd Battalions, 358th Infantry, 90th Infantry Division. The 1st and 2nd Battalions were inactivated on December 31, 1965.

On October 17, 1999, the 358th Infantry was re-designated the 358th Regiment and organized to consist of 1st, 2d, and 3d Battalions, 358th Regiment, 91st Division (Training Support), a unit of the Army Reserve. After the terrorist attacks of September 11, 2001, the battalions of the 358th Regiment took part in training soldiers for numerous deployments as part of the global war on terrorism.

The 358th Regiment was reorganized on October 2, 2009, and the 1st, 2nd, and 3rd Battalions were relieved from assignment to the 91st Division and allocated to the 191st Infantry Brigade at Joint Base Lewis-McChord, Washington. The October 1, 2016 reorganization of the 358th Infantry resulted in 2nd (Armor) and 3rd (Field Artillery) Battalions being allocated to the 189th Combined Arms Training Brigade and assigned to Joint Base Lewis-McChord.

== Decorations ==
- The 358th Regiment is entitled to:

French Croix de Guerre with Palm, World War II, Streamer embroidered MOSELLE-SARRE RIVERS

- 1st Battalion additionally entitled to:

Army Presidential Unit Citation, Streamer embroidered ARDENNES
Army Superior Unit Award, Streamer embroidered 2003-2005

- 2nd Battalion additionally entitled to:

Army Superior Unit Award, Streamer embroidered 2003-2005
Army Superior Unit Award, Streamer embroidered 2005-2007
Army Superior Unit Award, Streamer embroidered 2008-2011

- 3rd Battalion additionally entitled to:

Presidential Unit Citation (Army), Streamer embroidered MAHLMANN LINE (Note: The Mahlmann Line was a German defensive position during the Battle of Normandy and was named for its German commander.)
Army Superior Unit Award, Streamer embroidered 2003-2005
Army Superior Unit Award, Streamer embroidered 2008-2011
