= Henry Terrell Jr. =

United States Army general

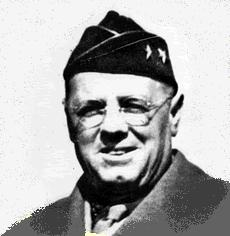
- Born: October 14, 1890; San Antonio, Texas, United States
- Died: October 3, 1971 (aged 80); San Antonio, Texas, United States
- Burial place: Fort Sam Houston National Cemetery, Texas, United States
- Military career
- Allegiance: United States
- Branch: United States Army
- Service years: 1912–1946
- Rank: Major General
- Service number: 0-3264
- Unit: Infantry Branch
- Commands: 9th Infantry Regiment; 8th Infantry Division; 90th Infantry Division; XXII Corps
- Conflicts: World War I World War II
- Awards: Army Distinguished Service Medal; Legion of Merit; Croix de guerre (France)

Major General Henry Terrell Jr. (October 14, 1890 – October 3, 1971) was a senior United States Army officer. Terrell commanded the 90th Infantry Division from its activation in March 1942 to January 1944 during World War II.

== Early life and military career ==
Born October 14, 1890, in San Antonio, Texas, he attended the University of Texas from 1908 until 1910, where he was a member of Phi Kappa Psi fraternity. He was, at some point, commissioned as a second lieutenant in the Infantry Branch of the United States Army, and was assigned to the 7th Infantry Regiment stationed at Fort Leavenworth, Kansas.

He was subsequently transferred to the 22nd Infantry Regiment, then stationed at Fort Bliss, Texas, where he participated in the border patrol duty during the Pancho Villa Expedition. He then was transferred to the 29th Infantry Regiment in February 1915, for duty in the Panama Canal Zone.

He returned to the United States in August 1917, four months after the American entry into World War I, and served (now with the rank of captain) with the 58th Infantry Regiment in Pennsylvania and North Carolina. In July 1918, his regiment was transferred to the Western Front to serve as part of the American Expeditionary Force (AEF), commanded by General John J. Pershing, who had led the Pancho Villa Expedition. As an infantry officer, he participated in the Champagne-Marne defensive operations, the Aisne-Marne Offensive, the Battle of Saint-Mihiel and the Meuse-Argonne Offensive. The war ended soon afterwards, after the Armistice with Germany was signed on November 11, 1918. For his bravery in the war he was awarded the French Croix de guerre.

== Between the wars ==
He stayed in the army during the interwar period where he attended the U.S. Army Command and General Staff School, graduating from there in 1925. In the early 1930s he attended the U.S. Army War College and from 1936 to 1938 he commanded the 9th Infantry Regiment.

== World War II ==
During World War II Terrell briefly commanded the 8th Infantry Division in March 1941. By March 1942, three months after the Japanese attack on Pearl Harbor and the subsequent American entry into the war, he was promoted to the two-star rank of major general and was the first Commanding General (CG) of the 90th "Tough Ombres" Infantry Division. The division was composed mostly of conscripts (draftees) who were new to military service. His Assistant Division Commander (ADC) was Charles W. Ryder until January 1943 when Alan W. Jones succeeded him. Terrell led the division in numerous training exercises in the United States. In mid-January 1944, he was promoted (although without change in rank) to command of the newly created XXII Corps in the United States. However, he never led the corps in combat as, in November 1944, Terrell was ordered to command the Infantry Advanced Replacement Training Center until the end of the war. Major General Ernest Harmon, a highly experienced and competent commander, subsequently became CG of XXII Corps.

The 90th Infantry Division, which later went on to fight in the Battle of Normandy, was considered by many senior American commanders (namely Major General Joe Collins, the VII Corps commander, and Lieutenant General Omar Bradley, then the commander of the U.S. First Army, who stated that the 90th was "one of the worst-trained outfits to arrive in the ETO") to have performed poorly in the opening stages of the campaign. Much of the blame for this was not placed on Terrell's successor, Brigadier General Jay W. MacKelvie, but rather on Terrell. Nevertheless, for his services in raising and training the division, Terrell was awarded the Army Distinguished Service Medal, the citation for which reads:

The President of the United States of America, authorized by Act of Congress July 9, 1918, takes pleasure in presenting the Army Distinguished Service Medal to Colonel (Infantry), [then Major General] Henry Terrell, Jr. (ASN: 0-3264), United States Army, for exceptionally meritorious and distinguished services to the Government of the United States, in a duty of great responsibility as Commanding General, 90th Infantry Division and later as Commanding General XXII Corps, from 1942 to 1945.

== Postwar ==
Major General Henry Terrell Jr. retired from the army on April 30, 1946, almost a year after the end of World War II in Europe, and died on October 3, 1971, in San Antonio, Texas, his birthplace. He is buried together with his wife Helen (1891–1972) at Fort Sam Houston National Cemetery.

== Medals and decorations ==
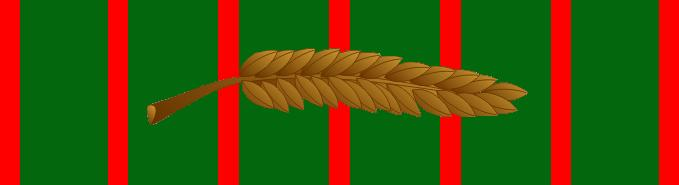
Army Distinguished Service Medal
Legion of Merit
Mexican Border Service Medal
World War I Victory Medal with four battle clasps
American Defense Service Medal
American Campaign Medal
World War II Victory Medal
French Croix de Guerre 1914–1918 with Palm

Military offices
Preceded by William E. Shedd	Commanding General 8th Infantry Division; March 1941	Succeeded by James P. Marley
Preceded by Newly activated organization	Commanding General 90th Infantry Division; 1942–1944	Succeeded by Jay W. MacKelvie
Preceded by Newly activated organization	Commanding General XXII Corps; January–November 1944	Succeeded by Ernest N. Harmon
