= Eugene M. Landrum =

American Army general

Eugene Manuel Landrum
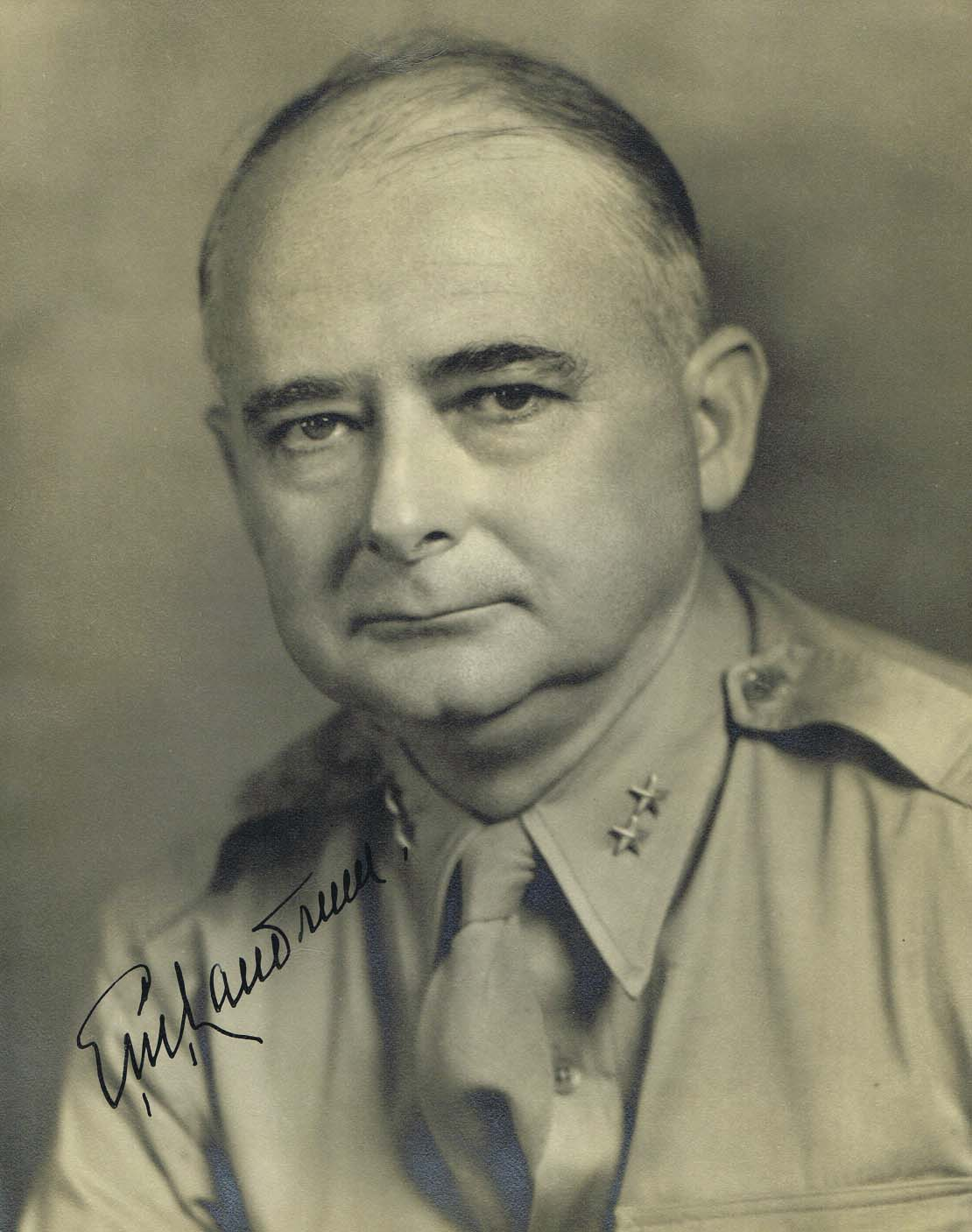
- Born: February 6, 1891; Pensacola, Florida, United States
- Died: July 24, 1967 (aged 76); Springfield, Illinois, United States
- Burial place: San Francisco National Cemetery, California, United States
- Military career
- Allegiance: United States
- Branch: United States Army
- Service years: 1909–1951
- Rank: Major General
- Service number: 0-4570
- Units: Coast Artillery Corps; Infantry Branch
- Commands: 7th Infantry Division; 87th Infantry Division; 90th Infantry Division; 71st Infantry Division; Infantry Advanced Replacement Training Center, Camp Maxey, Texas
- Conflicts: World War I Russian Civil War; World War II; Korean War
- Awards: Army Distinguished Service Medal (2); Navy Distinguished Service Medal

Major General Eugene M. Landrum (February 6, 1891 – July 24, 1967) was a senior United States Army officer. He is known primarily for defeating the Japanese in the Aleutian Islands Campaign at the start of World War II, being relieved as commander of the 90th Infantry Division shortly after the D-Day landings, and organizing the Pusan Perimeter to blunt the North Korean offensive during the Korean War.

== Early life and military career ==
Eugene Manuel Landrum was born in Pensacola, Florida, on February 6, 1891. He was educated in Florida and enlisted in the Alabama National Guard’s Company M of the 1st Regiment in 1909. He joined the United States Army as a member of the Coast Artillery Corps on August 20, 1910, and quickly transferred to the Infantry Branch. Landrum served in the 17th and 2nd Infantry Regiments, and attained the rank of sergeant.

He was commissioned as a second lieutenant in the Infantry Branch, and was assigned to the 20th Infantry Regiment in November 1916. He served initially in Hawaii, where he was promoted to first lieutenant.

Shortly after the American entry into World War I, in April 1917, Landrum was assigned to the 43rd Infantry Regiment, and performed duty as aide-de-camp to Robert K. Evans in the Philippines. Landrum later took part in action in Russia as part of American Expeditionary Force, Siberia.

== Between the wars ==
After the war Landrum continued his army career, receiving promotion to captain and carrying out Infantry and Adjutant General assignments in Washington, D.C., and at forts including Leavenworth, Benning, and Lewis. He was promoted to major in 1927. In the mid-1930s, he commanded the 23rd Forestry District of the Civilian Conservation Corps, with headquarters in Marion, Illinois.

Landrum graduated from the U.S. Army Command and General Staff School in 1933 and the U.S. Army War College in 1936. He was promoted to lieutenant colonel on April 1, 1938.

== World War II ==
When the United States entered World War II in December 1941 Landrum was Chief of Staff of the 3rd Infantry Division at Fort Lewis, after receiving a temporary promotion to colonel in June 26.

On March 12, 1942, he was promoted to temporary brigadier general and was assigned as assistant division commander (ADC) of the 3rd Infantry Division until June when William W. Eagles succeeded him. Landrum served with the 7th Infantry Division in the Aleutian Islands campaign during combat as the United States reclaimed islands in the Aleutians which had been seized by the Japanese. For his service in Alaska, Landrum received both the Army and Navy Distinguished Service Medals.

Landrum was promoted to temporary major general on March 13, 1943 and commanded the 87th Infantry Division during its training in the United States. He relinquished command and went to Europe shortly before the June 1944 D-Day invasion, with U.S. First Army commander Omar Bradley, keeping Landrum unassigned and available to command a division on short notice.

The 90th Infantry Division took part in the D-Day invasion, coming ashore on D-Day+1 and conducting combat activities in Normandy. Major General J. Lawton Collins, commanding the VII Corps, became concerned that the 90th, which had not seen service in the war so far, was not performing effectively in combat. As a result, he relieved the division commander, Brigadier General Jay W. MacKelvie and assigned Landrum as his replacement.

Landrum commanded the division during the rest of June and into August. During this period, he became involved in a verbal altercation with his ADC, Brigadier General Samuel Tankersley Williams, and requested that Williams be reduced in rank to colonel and reassigned. Landrum's superiors concurred, and the action was carried out. (Despite this, Williams remained in the army and was eventually promoted again to brigadier general in 1951, and advanced to lieutenant general before retiring in 1960.) In August, Landrum's corps, army and army group commanders were still not satisfied with the performance of the 90th Division, and Landrum was relieved. He was succeeded by Major General Raymond S. McLain, and returned to the United States.

Upon returning to the United States Landrum succeeded Robert L. Spragins as commander of the 71st Infantry Division during its mobilization and training before it departed for combat in Europe. He did not remain in command when the division departed for Europe, but was reassigned to command the Infantry Advanced Replacement Training Center at Camp Maxey, Texas.

== Postwar ==
Following World War II Landrum returned to his permanent rank of colonel and continued his career, including assignment as Deputy Chief of Staff of the Fifth Army in Chicago.

== Korean War ==
During the Korean War Landrum served with Eighth Army, first as Deputy Chief of Staff and then Chief of Staff.

At the time, commanders of numbered armies were not officially authorized deputies, so Landrum served as the de facto deputy for General Walton Walker, the Eighth Army commander.

Walker, who had served with Landrum at Fifth Army, relied on him during organization of the Pusan Perimeter as Eighth Army organized the defensive action which enabled U.S. and South Korean forces to begin the counterattack that pushed the North Koreans north across the 38th Parallel. Walker, who always referred to Landrum as "General Landrum" in recognition of his temporary World War II rank, made Landrum responsible for finding replacement troops and reinforcements and employing them where they could be most effective. Landrum received a second award of the Distinguished Service Medal to recognize his efforts in Korea.

Landrum served until reaching the mandatory retirement age of 60. He retired at his wartime rank of major general in a ceremony at Fort Mason, California.

== Death and burial ==
In retirement Landrum resided in San Jose, California. He died in Springfield, Illinois, on July 24, 1967, and was buried at San Francisco National Cemetery, Section DE, Site 17-A.

== Family ==
Landrum was married to Frances Richardson Yeater (1894–1961), the daughter of Charles Yeater. Their children included son Eugene and daughter Marianna.

== External resources ==
- Generals of World War II

Military offices
| Preceded by Albert E. Brown | Commanding General 7th Infantry Division; May−June 1943 | Succeeded by Archibald Vincent Arnold |
| Preceded by Percy W. Clarkson | Commanding General 87th Infantry Division; 1943−1944 | Succeeded by Frank L. Culin Jr. |
| Preceded by Jay W. MacKelvie | Commanding General 90th Infantry Division; July–August 1944 | Succeeded by Raymond S. McLain |
| Preceded by Robert L. Spragins | Commanding General 71st Infantry Division; October–November 1944 | Succeeded by Willard G. Wyman |
| Preceded by Cortlandt V. R. Schuyler | Commanding General Infantry Advanced Replacement Training Center, Camp Maxey, Texas; 1944–1946 | Succeeded by Post deactivated |
