= Charles Ryder =

Charles Ryder may refer to:

- Charles Henry Dudley Ryder (1868–1945), English army officer and explorer who served as Surveyor General of India
- Charles W. Ryder (1892–1960), United States Army officer who was decorated in both WW1 and WW2
- Charles W. Ryder Jr. (1920–2010), his son, United States Army major general

== See also ==
- Brideshead Revisited: the Sacred and Profane Memories of Captain Charles Ryder, full title of Brideshead Revisited, a novel by Evelyn Waugh
