= General Ryder =

General Ryder may refer to:

- Charles W. Ryder (1892–1960), U.S. Army major general
- Charles W. Ryder Jr. (1920–2010), U.S. Army major general
- Donald J. Ryder (fl. 1970s–2010s), U.S. Army major general
- William T. Ryder (1913–1992), U.S. Army brigadier general
- Patrick S. Ryder, U.S. Air Force major general, Pentagon spokesman
