= John B. Wogan =

US Army general (1890–1968)

John Beugnot Wogan
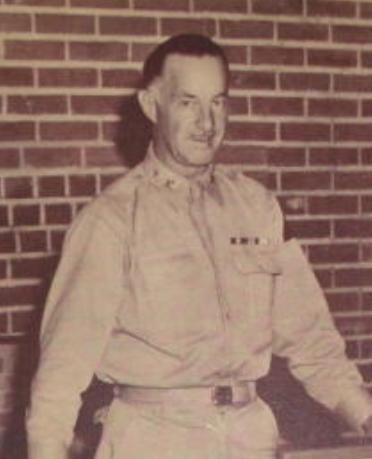
- Born: January 1, 1890; New Orleans, Louisiana, United States
- Died: September 30, 1968 (aged 78); Asheville, North Carolina, United States
- Burial place: Arlington National Cemetery, Virginia, United States
- Military career
- Allegiance: United States
- Branch: United States Army
- Service years: 1915–1946
- Rank: Major General
- Service number: 0-3834
- Unit: Coast Artillery Corps
- Commands: 68th Field Artillery Regiment; 13th Armored Division
- Conflicts: World War I World War II
- Awards: Army Distinguished Service Medal; Silver Star; Legion of Merit; Purple Heart

Major General John Beugnot Wogan (January 1, 1890 – September 30, 1968) was a decorated United States Army officer. He is most noted for his leadership of the 13th Armored Division for the most of World War II.

== Military career ==
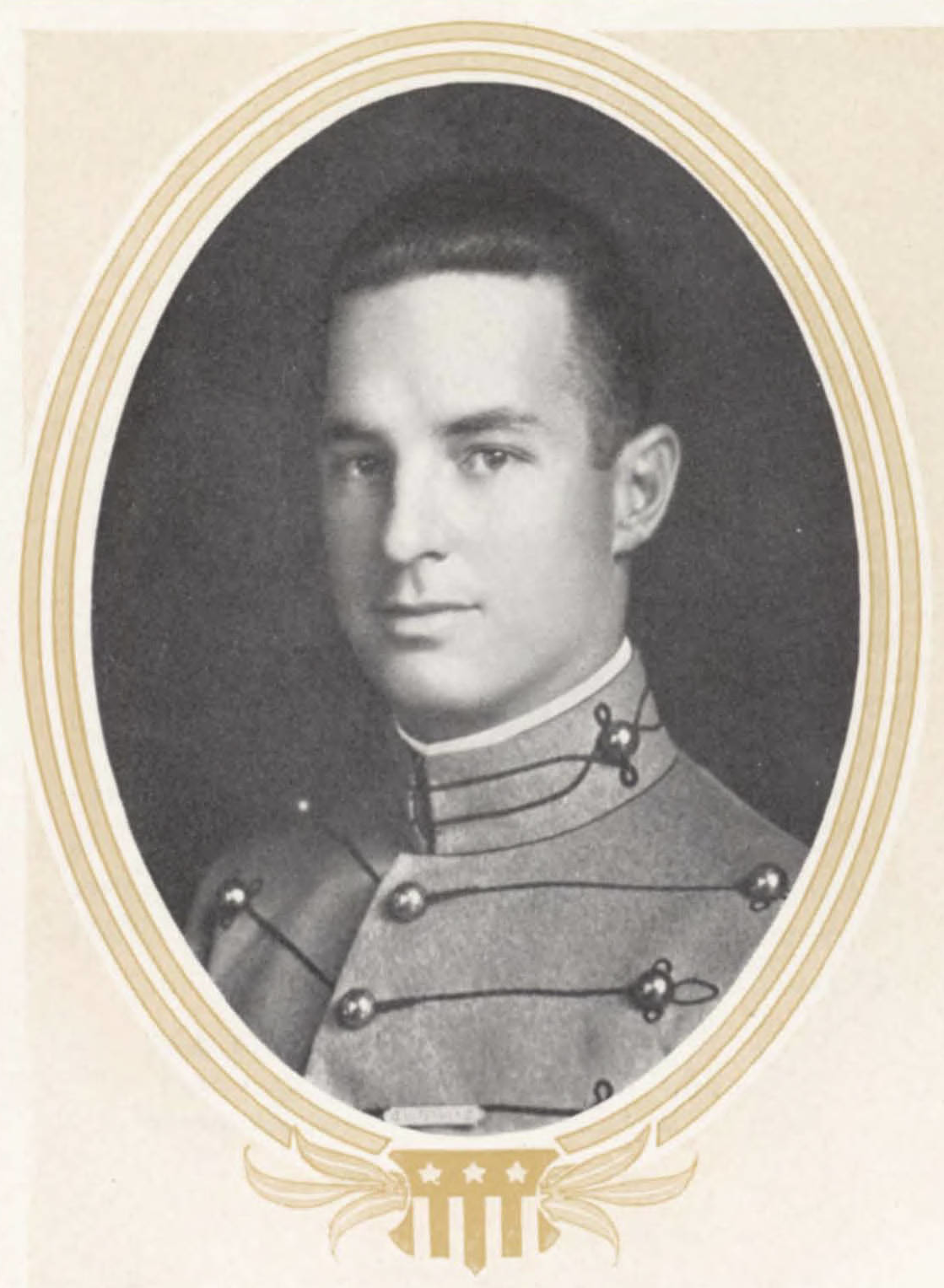
At West Point in 1915

John B. Wogan was born on January 1, 1890, in New Orleans, Louisiana. He graduated from the United States Military Academy at West Point, New York, in 1915 as a part of The class the stars fell on. His classmates were for example Dwight D. Eisenhower, Omar Bradley, James Van Fleet, Paul J. Mueller, Charles W. Ryder and Stafford LeRoy Irwin, all big future generals of World War II.

He was commissioned a second lieutenant of coastal artillery, and his first service assignment was at Fort H. G. Wright during the years 1915–1916.

Fluent in both French and English (parents were from old New Orleans French lineage), Wogan spent extensive time in France as a staff translator for the Army of Occupation after World War 1.

In 1931, Wogan was posted to Panama as a major of Pack Artillery, and oversaw the first ever aerial deployment of artillery, using army aircraft to transport artillery from one side of the Panama Canal to the other.

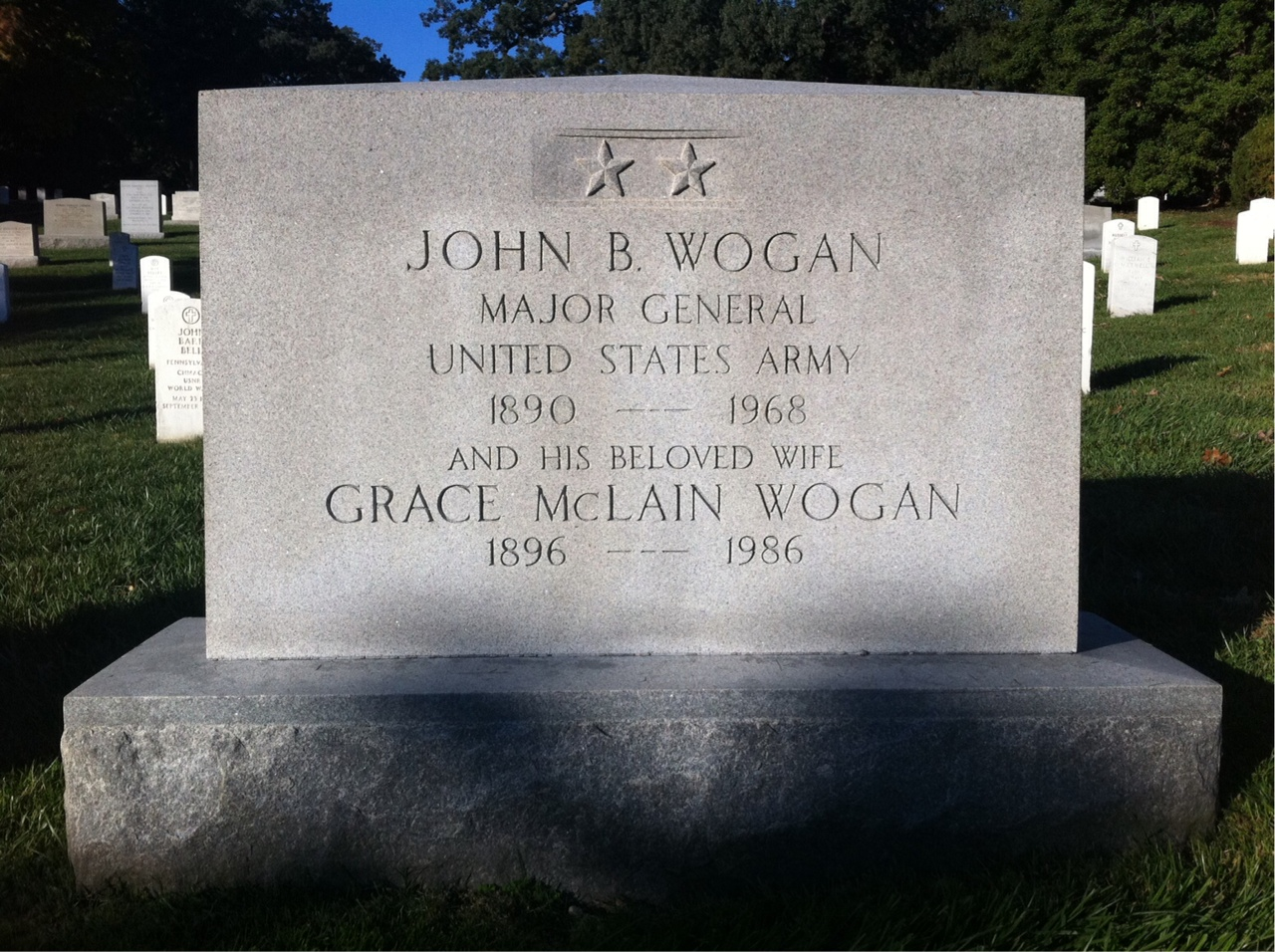
The grave of Major General John B. Wogan at Arlington National Cemetery

In 1939, Wogan transferred service branches once again, this time to the Armored Corps. He eventually rose in rank to major general, commanding the 13th Armored division from 1942 to 1945. On April 15. 1945, Wogan fought a desperate German offensive in the Ruhr Pocket, at a German roadblock near the Autobahn interchange Leverkusen, where he was severely wounded by German rifle fire. He was forced to medically retire as a result of these wounds after a lengthy convalescence in military hospitals.

Wogan retired to his wife's hometown of Asheville, North Carolina, where he spent the remainder of his life as the director of the veterans hospital there. He was active in civic causes until his death in 1968.

== Decorations ==
| Army Distinguished Service Medal |
| Silver Star |
| Legion of Merit |
| Purple Heart |
| Mexican Border Service Medal |
| World War I Victory Medal |
| American Defense Service Medal |
| American Campaign Medal |
| European-African-Middle Eastern Campaign Medal with 4 Service Stars |
| World War II Victory Medal |

== Effective dates of promotion ==
Wogan's effective dates of promotion were:

- Second Lieutenant, June 12, 1915
- First Lieutenant, July 1, 1916
- Captain (temporary), August 5, 1917
- Captain, October 12, 1917
- Major (temporary), October 11, 1918
- Captain, June 30, 1920 (reduced from temporary major)
- Major, July 2, 1920
- Captain, November 4, 1922 (reduced from major)
- Major, November 2, 1924
- Lieutenant Colonel, September 1, 1936
- Colonel (temporary), June 26, 1941
- Brigadier General (temporary), July 1, 1941
- Major General (temporary), February 16, 1942
- Colonel, January 1, 1944
- Major General (retired), October 31, 1946

Military offices
| Preceded by Newly activated organization | Commanding General 13th Armored Division; 1942–1945 | Succeeded by John Millikin |
