= John Millikin =

United States Army general

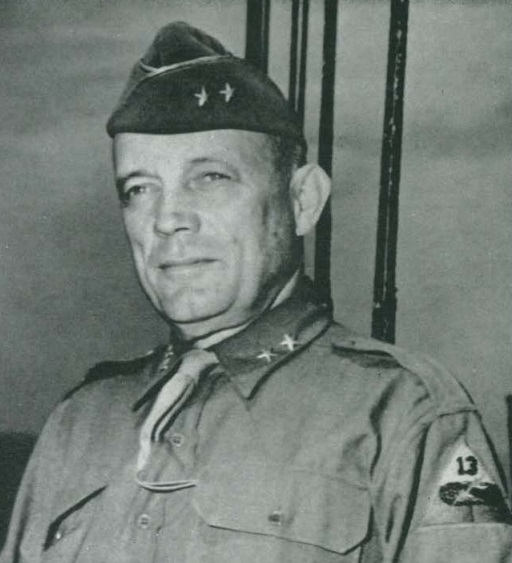
- MIllikin as commander of the 13th Armored Division during World War II
- Born: January 7, 1888; Danville, Indiana, United States
- Died: November 6, 1970 (aged 82); Washington, D.C., United States
- Burial place: Arlington National Cemetery
- Military career
- Allegiance: United States
- Branch: United States Army
- Service years: 1910–1948
- Rank: Major general
- Service number: O-2856
- Unit: Cavalry Branch
- Commands: 6th Cavalry Regiment; 1st Cavalry Brigade; 2nd Cavalry Division; 33rd Infantry Division; III Corps; 13th Armored Division
- Conflicts: World War I World War II
- Awards: Army Distinguished Service Medal; Silver Star; Soldier's Medal; Bronze Star

Signature
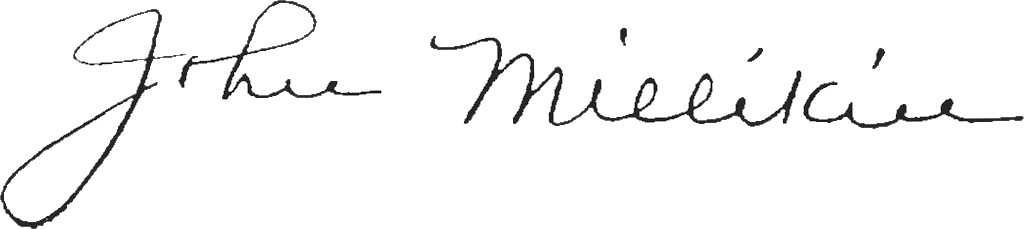

Major General John Millikin (January 7, 1888 – November 6, 1970) was a senior United States Army officer who served in both World War I and World War II. During the latter, Millikin commanded III Corps in General George S. Patton's U.S. Third Army during the Battle of the Bulge in December 1944.

== Early life and military career ==
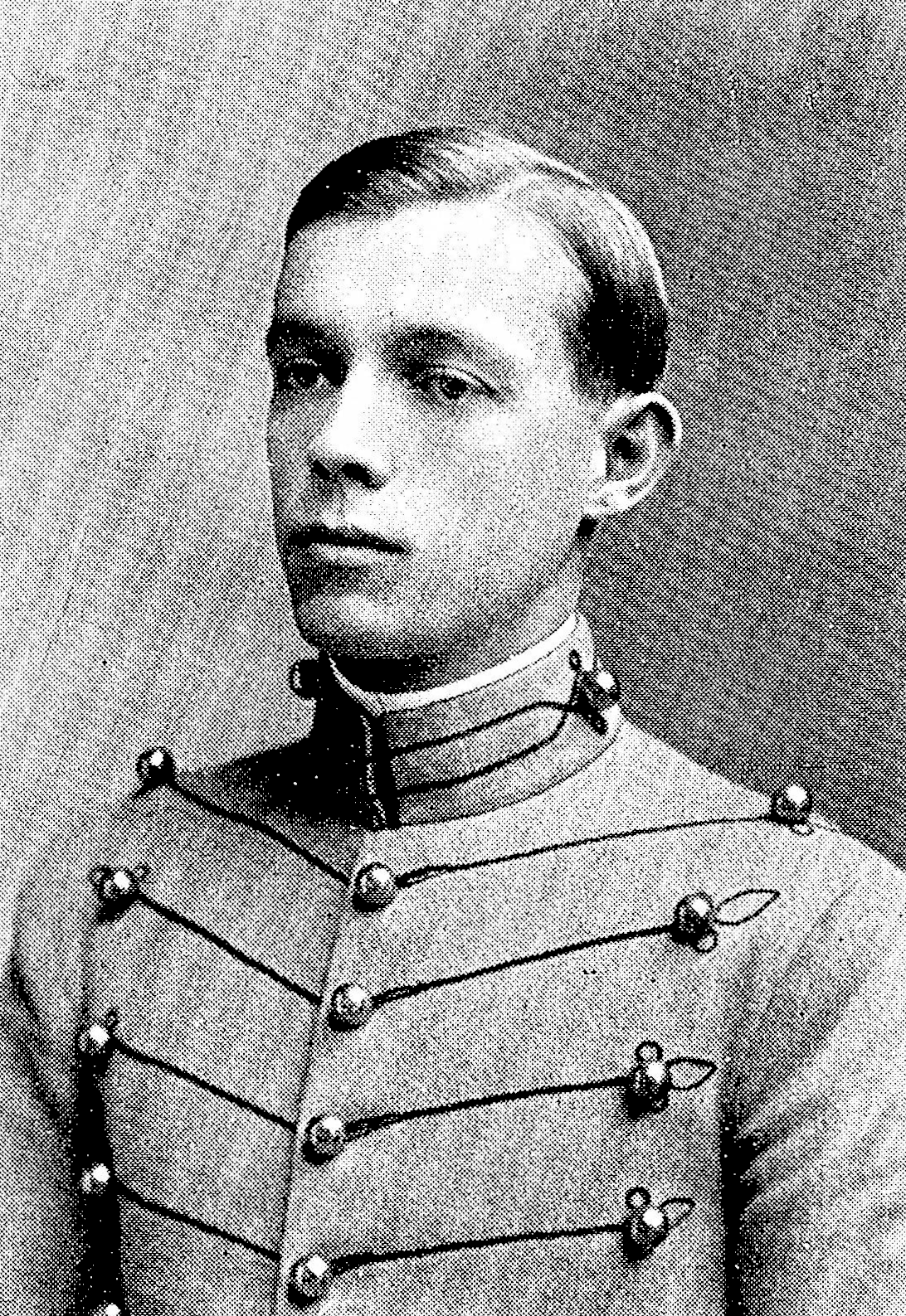
Millikin at West Point in 1910.

John Millikin was born January 7, 1888, in Danville, Indiana, the son of Horace F. Millikin, a barber, and Ida Millikin. Millikin entered the United States Military Academy (USMA) at West Point, New York, in 1906, graduating in June 1910 as a second lieutenant into the Cavalry Branch of the United States Army. He graduated 38th in a class of 82 alongside men such as Ernest J. Dawley, Lewis Burton, Oscar Griswold, Emil F. Reinhardt, Oscar Solbert, Durward S. Wilson, David McCracken Jr., Frederick S. Strong Jr., Burton O. Lewis, Raymond F. Fowler, Walter H. Frank, Robert H. Dunlop, Harry Chamberlin, Fred C. Wallace, Jack W. Heard, James Muir and numerous others who, like Millikin, would be general officers. His first assignment was with the 5th Cavalry Regiment at Schofield Barracks, Hawaii. He later was assigned to Fort Myer, Virginia.

In February 1918, ten months after the American entry into World War I, Millikin was the executive officer (XO) of the U.S. Army General Staff College in Langres, France. He was promoted to the rank of lieutenant colonel on November 16, 1918, five days after the Armistice with Germany, and became chief of the military police of the American Expeditionary Forces (AEF). He returned to the United States in the summer of 1919 and was honorably discharged from the National Army on March 15, 1920, and reverted to his Regular Army rank of captain. For his services during the war he was awarded the Army Distinguished Service Medal, the citation for which reads:

The President of the United States of America, authorized by Act of Congress, July 9, 1918, takes pleasure in presenting the Army Distinguished Service Medal to Lieutenant Colonel (Cavalry) John Millikin, United States Army, for exceptionally meritorious and distinguished services to the Government of the United States, in a duty of great responsibility during World War I. As Executive Officer and Assistant Director of the Army General Staff College, at Langres, Lieutenant Colonel Millikin rendered conspicuous services. Later, as Chief of the Military Police Corps Division of the Provost Marshal General's Department, American Expeditionary Forces, by his ability, untiring zeal, and wound judgment, he aided in a material way in producing an efficient organization. He has rendered services of great value to the American Expeditionary Forces.

== Between the wars ==
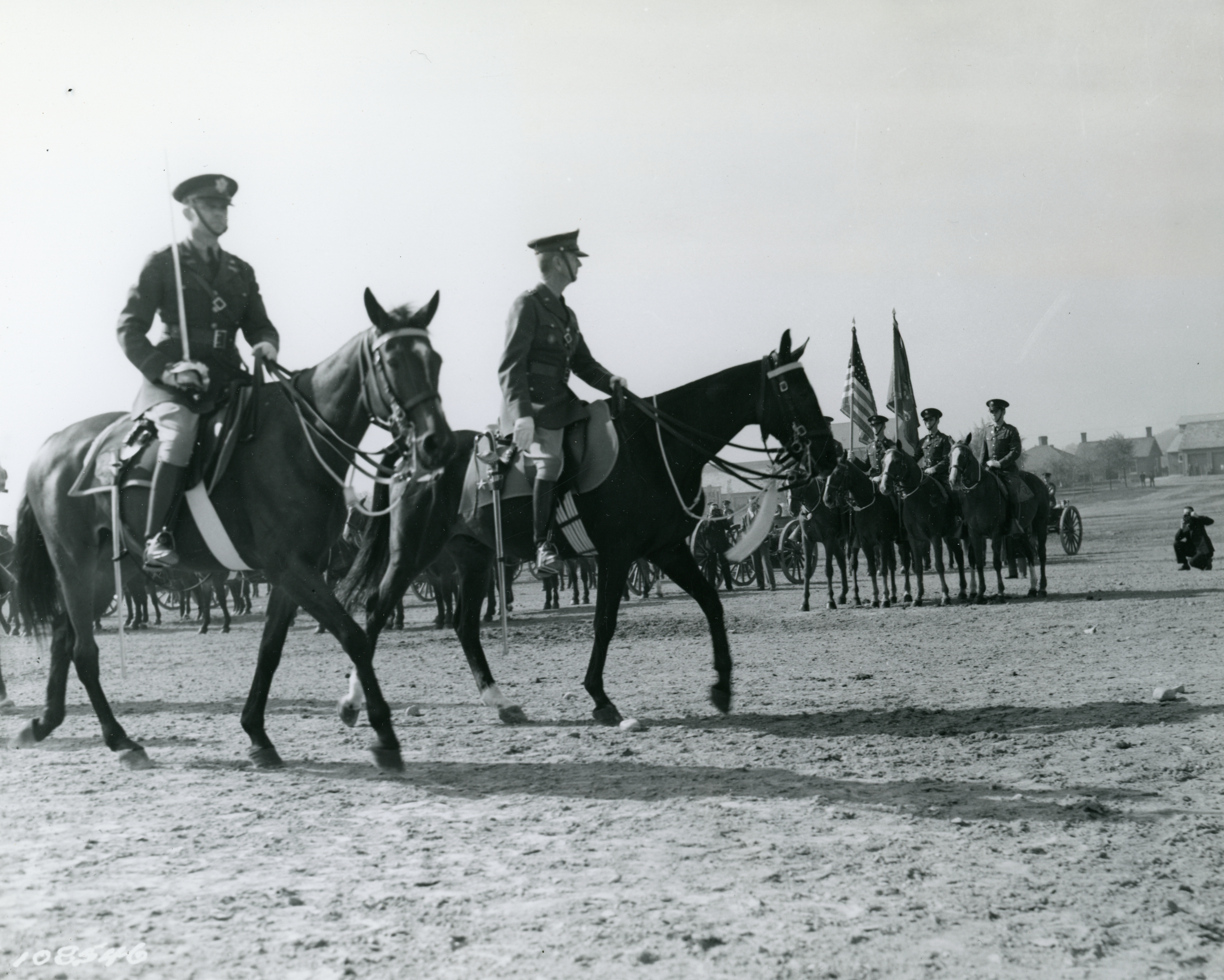
Millikin (left) and Gen. Jonathan M. Wainwright (right) review troops at Ft. Myer, Virginia c. 1938

After the war, Captain Millikin Graduated from the U.S. Army Cavalry School Advanced Course, and he returned to the U.S. Army Command and General Staff School at Fort Leavenworth, Kansas, as a distinguished graduate ranking 30th out of 245 in 1926. He served as a faculty member from 1926 to 1930. He then attended the Army War College from 1930 to 1931.

- Director of the Cavalry School July 1933 to August 1936
- XO, 3rd Cavalry Regiment August 1936 to December 1938
- General Staff Corps December 2, 1938, to August 31, 1939
- Commanding Officer 6th Cavalry Regiment September 9, 1939, to October 1, 1940
- Commanding Officer 1st Cavalry Brigade October 1, 1940, to June 1941

== World War II ==
- Commanding General 2nd Cavalry Division June 1941 to April 1942

Millikin commanded the division as part of the 1st Armored Corps attached to the 2nd Army during the Louisiana Maneuvers in September 1941.

- Commanding General 33rd Division September 1942 to September 1943.

The 33rd Division deployed to the Pacific July 7, 1943, in Hawaii the division was divided into different units along the island chain. October 18, 1943, Major General Percy W. Clarkson took command of the division.

Lieutenant General Lesley J. McNair, commander of the Army Ground Forces, who thought highly of Millikin, gave him command of III Corps in October 1943 at Fort McPherson, Georgia.

On August 23, 1944, the corps headquarters departed California for Camp Myles Standish in Massachusetts. It deployed for the European Theater of Operations (ETO) on September 5, 1944. Upon arrival at Cherbourg, France, the corps was assigned to the Ninth Army, commanded by Lieutenant General William Hood Simpson (who, apparently, respected Millikin's abilities), part of Lieutenant General Omar Bradley's U.S. 12th Army Group, and given the code name "CENTURY" which it retained throughout the war. The corps headquarters was established at Carteret, in Normandy, and for six weeks, the corps received and processed all the troops of the 12th Army Group arriving over the Normandy beaches during that period. The corps also participated in the "Red Ball Express" by organizing 45 provisional truck companies to carry fuel and ammunition for the units on the front lines.

Although it was intended to serve with Simpson's Ninth Army, III Corps was instead assigned to the Third Army, commanded by a fellow cavalryman, Lieutenant General George S. Patton, on October 10, 1944, and moved to Etain, near Verdun, and into combat. The reason for the transfer from the Ninth Army to the Third were simply because Patton was only commanding two corps instead of the usual three. The corps' first fighting was for the Metz region, as it was moved to attack Fort Jeanne d'Arc, one of the last forts holding out in the region. That fort fell on December 13, 1944.

=== Relief of Bastogne ===
The forces to be employed for the relief of Bastogne had been earmarked as early as the night of December 18, 1944, when Bradley and Patton agreed to move the new III Corps headquarters (as yet inexperienced and untried) from Metz to Arlon. The divisions given to Major General John Millikin (the 26th and 80th Infantry Divisions, and the 4th Armored Division) all had been out of the line or in a quiet sector when the Third Army was ordered north, and thus were selected almost automatically.

In the south, Patton's Third Army was battling to relieve Bastogne. At 16:50 on December 26, 1944, the lead element, Company D, 37th Tank Battalion of the 4th Armored Division, reached Bastogne, ending the siege. Millikin received a second Army Distinguished Service Medal for his leadership in driving his forces through the German defenses to relieve the besieged troops in Bastogne.

On February 10, 1945, Bradley moved III Corps, minus one division, to Lieutenant General Courtney Hodges' First Army control.

=== Battle of Remagen ===
Major General John W. Leonard, commanding the veteran 9th Armored Division, later recalled that on March 6, 1945, Major General Millikin, referring to the Ludendorff Bridge, told him over the phone, "You see that black line on the map. If you can seize that your name will go down in history." In the last week of February, Colonel Charles G. Patterson, the anti-aircraft artillery officer for III Corps, led a meeting for brigade and group commanders during which they discussed what they would do if they were lucky enough to capture a bridge intact.

On March 2, 1945, Major General Millikin assigned the 14th Tank Battalion commanded by Lieutenant Colonel Leonard E. Engeman to the north flank and attached it to the 1st Infantry Division. The 9th Armored's Combat Command B attacked towards the Erft river, and Combat Command A advanced towards the Ahr river. They were to then move south to capture Remagen and Sinzeg before linking up with the flanks of Lieutenant General Patton's Third Army.

Seeing the bridge intact, Brigadier General William M. Hoge, Commander of Combat Group A, waited for a platoon of the 9th Infantry Division to reach the far bank, hoping the bridge would stand, and then called Major General Leonard to inform him the bridge had been captured.

Millikin ordered that the 47th Infantry Regiment, part of the 9th Infantry Division, be motorized and dispatched to Remagen as soon as possible. Millikin relayed the news to Bradley's 12th Army Group headquarters at 8:15 pm. Millikin attached the 7th Armored Division to III Corps so they could relieve the 9th Infantry Division, who were already crossing the Rhine. He also ordered the 2nd Infantry Division to relieve the 78th Infantry Division so it too could cross the Rhine and defend the bridgehead.

=== Millikin relieved ===
On March 17, 1945, the First Army commander, Lieutenant General Courtney H. Hodges, relieved Millikin of his command, and Major General James Van Fleet took over, upon the recommendation of Bradley. Hodges and some of his staff had complained about the poor control of forces on both sides of the bridge and the lack of information on troop dispositions. According to General William C. Westmoreland, then the chief of staff of the 9th Infantry Division, Millikin had never visited the eastern bank of the Rhine after the bridge's capture. Hodges also complained later that Millikin had repeatedly disobeyed his orders including a directive to drive his forces north along the east bank and open a crossing for Major General J. Lawton Collins's VII Corps, and that he failed to attach enough infantry support to the 9th Armored Division. These political observations are offset by the awarding of a Silver Star to Millikin for his brave leadership in exposing himself to enemy fire to personally speed his troops across the river. The Silver Star citation cited his "cool self-assurance and heroic deliberation" in leading his forces to establish a secure foothold across the Rhine" For their part, Millikin and his staff could blame misunderstandings with the First Army headquarters, inadequate communications with the eastern bank of the Rhine, and a lack of roads, bridges, and service troops to accommodate the flood of units into a bridgehead that higher headquarters had never intended to be a gateway across the Rhine.

Within a month, Millikin assumed command of the 13th Armored Division whose commander, Major General John B. Wogan, had been seriously wounded. Millikin, previously highly rated by Patton, the Third Army commander, formally objected to an unsatisfactory rating given him after his relief on May 7, 1945, by Hodges. Millikin affirmed that, "under the existing conditions my actions taken on the ground were justified in the light of successful results." Bradley noted on the efficiency report that Millikin's successor, Major General Van Fleet, "was better qualified to command the corps than General Millikin with his limited experience." Bradley added that Millikin's record should not be adversely affected by his relief.

== Postwar ==
Major General Millikin returned to the Regular Army on April 30, 1946, in his permanent rank of colonel, and was promoted to brigadier general on January 24, 1948. He retired on February 29, 1948, and was promoted to major general (retired) on June 29, 1948.

Major General John Millikin died in Washington, D.C., on November 6, 1970, aged 82.

== Promotions ==
| No insignia | Cadet, United States Military Academy: June 15, 1906 |
| No pin insignia in 1910 | Second Lieutenant of Cavalry, Regular Army: June 15, 1910 |
| | First lieutenant, Regular Army: July 1, 1916 |
| | Captain, Regular Army: May 15, 1917 |
| | Major of Cavalry, National Army: June 22, 1918 |
| | Lieutenant colonel of Cavalry, National Army: November 16, 1918 |
| | Reverted to captain, Regular Army: March 15, 1920 |
| | Major, Regular Army: July 1, 1920 |
| | Lieutenant colonel, Regular Army: November 1, 1934 |
| | Colonel, Regular Army: June 1, 1939 |
| | Brigadier general, Army of the United States: October 2, 1940 |
| | Major general, Army of the United States: July 16, 1941 |
| | Reverted to colonel, Regular Army: April 30, 1946 |
| | Brigadier general, Regular Army: January 24, 1948 |
| | Major general, Regular Army (Retired List): June 29, 1948 |

== Bibliography ==
- Taaffe, Stephen R. (2013). Marshall and His Generals: U.S. Army Commanders in World War II. Lawrence, Kansas: University Press of Kansas. ISBN 978-0-7006-1942-9. OCLC 840162019.

Military offices
| Preceded by Terry Allen | Commanding General 2nd Cavalry Division; 1941–1942 | Succeeded by John B. Coulter |
| Preceded by Frank Mahin | Commanding General 33rd Infantry Division; 1942–1943 | Succeeded by Percy W. Clarkson |
| Preceded by Harold R. Bull | Commanding General III Corps; 1943–1945 | Succeeded by James Van Fleet |
| Preceded by John B. Wogan | Commanding General 13th Armored Division; April–September 1945 | Succeeded by Post deactivated |
