= Emil F. Reinhardt =

United States Army general

Emil Fred Reinhardt
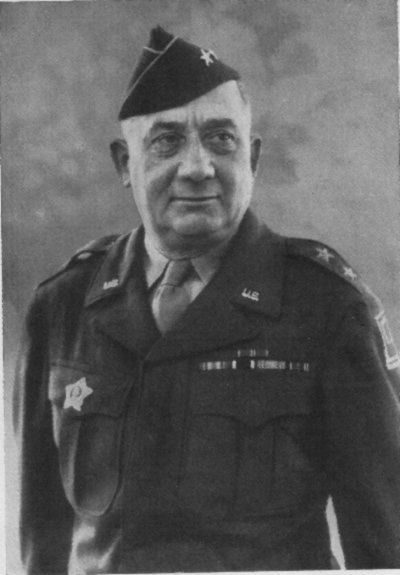
- Born: October 27, 1888; West Bay City, Michigan, United States
- Died: July 24, 1969 (aged 80); San Antonio, Texas, United States
- Burial place: Fort Sam Houston National Cemetery, San Antonio, Texas, United States
- Military career
- Allegiance: United States
- Branch: United States Army
- Service years: 1910–1946
- Rank: Major General
- Nickname: "Ducky"
- Service number: 0-2887
- Unit: Infantry Branch
- Commands: 41st Machine Gun Battalion; 20th Infantry Regiment; 76th Infantry Division; XIII Corps; VIII Corps; 69th Infantry Division
- Conflicts: World War I World War II
- Awards: Army Distinguished Service Medal; Bronze Star (2)

Signature
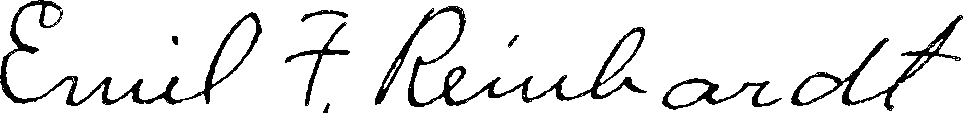

Emil Fred Reinhardt (October 27, 1888 – July 24, 1969) was a United States Army officer who served from 1910 to 1946 and attained the rank of major general. He is most noted during World War II as commander of the 69th Infantry Division, which became the first American unit to come into contact with units of the Soviet Red Army.

== Early life and military career ==
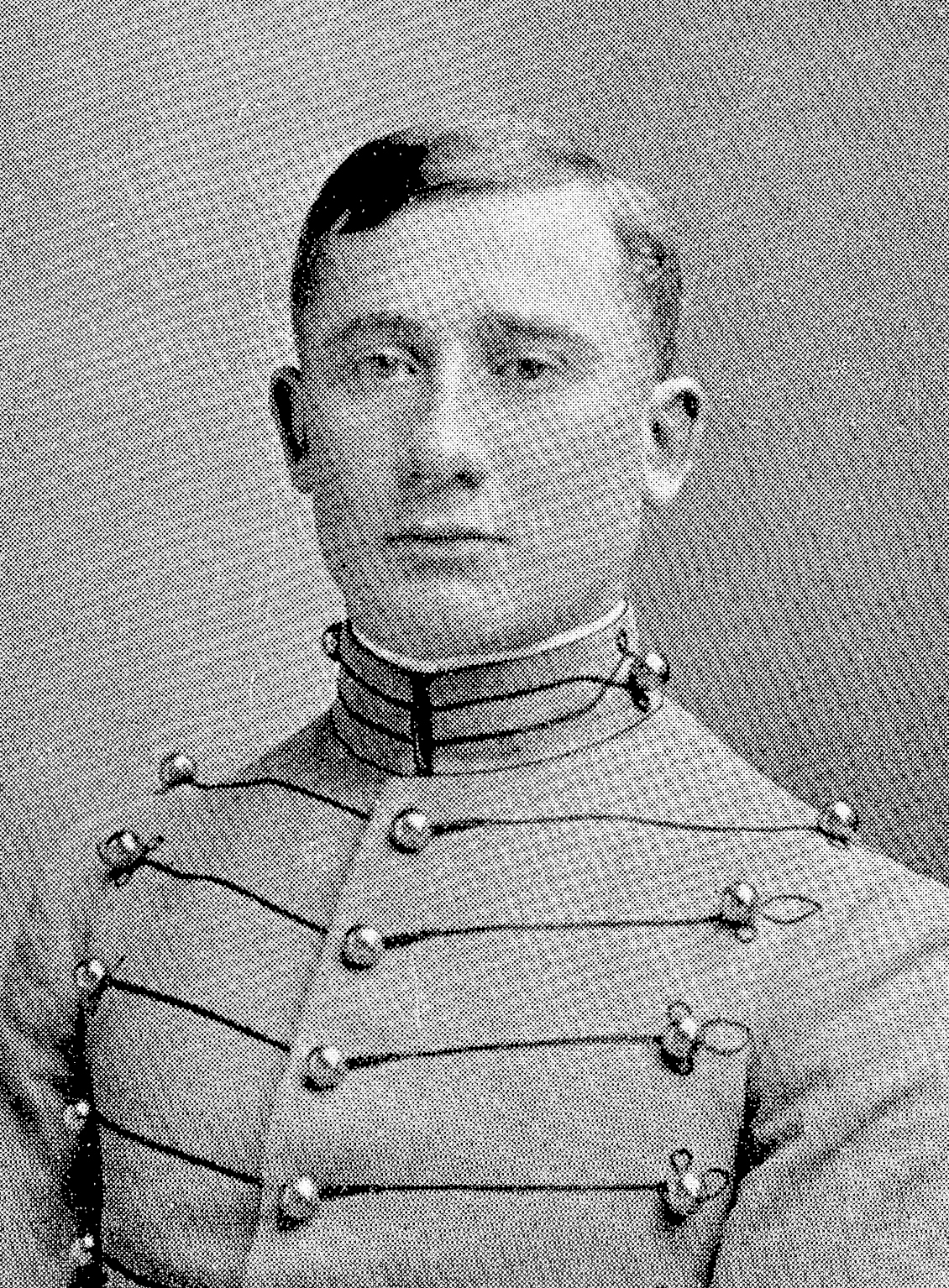
At West Point in 1910

Emil Fredrich Reinhardt was born in West Bay City (now Bay City, Michigan) on October 27, 1888, the son of Christoph L. Reinhardt and Seyville L. (Tomhafe) Reinhardt. He graduated from Bay City Western High School in 1906 and subsequently he attended the United States Military Academy (USMA) at West Point, New York. He graduated four years later in June 1910, at the age of 21, and was commissioned as a second lieutenant into the Infantry Branch of the United States Army. Among his fellow graduates were Ernest J. Dawley, David McCoach Jr., Burton O. Lewis, John Millikin, Jack W. Heard, Oscar Griswold, Durward Saunders Wilson, James Muir, Oscar Solbert, Harry Chamberlin, all of whom would, like Reinhardt, become general officers in the future.

After his graduation, Reinhardt served initially with the 26th Infantry Regiment at Fort Wayne, Michigan. Subsequent assignments included Texas City, Texas and the Philippines as a member of the 8th Infantry Regiment. He was promoted to first lieutenant in 1916 and captain in 1917.

During World War I, which the United States entered in April 1917, Reinhardt was promoted to temporary major. Recognized as an effective trainer and instructor, he did not see service overseas during the war and instead remained in the United States, where he served at Camp Fremont in California, Camp Pike in Arkansas, and Camp Hancock in Georgia, primarily as an instructor of infantry tactics and in the use of machine guns. In January 1919, just two months after the war came to an end with the signing of the Armistice with Germany, he was assigned as commander of the 41st Machine Gun Battalion at Camp Custer, Michigan. In 1919 and 1920 he also commanded the Camp Custer Convalescent Center.

== Between the wars ==
After the war Reinhardt was assigned to the 50th Infantry Regiment. He graduated from the U.S. Army Command and General Staff School in 1923. He was assigned as Professor of Military Science and tactics at the University of Dayton and the Miami Military Institute in Ohio from 1923 to 1928. and the U.S. Army War College in 1931. He was promoted to lieutenant colonel in 1935 and colonel in 1939.

From 1934 to 1938, Reinhardt served as an instructor with Pennsylvania National Guard, and in 1938 was transferred to Washington, D.C. as the executive officer (XO) of the Washington Provisional Brigade.

== World War II ==
Reinhardt then served as commander of 20th Infantry Regiment until April 1941, when he was promoted to the general officer one-star rank of brigadier general.

After his promotion, Reinhardt was appointed the assistant division commander (ADC) of the 7th Infantry Division, then under the command of Major General Charles H. White. His next assignment was at Camp Wolters, Texas, where he was appointed commanding general (CG) of the Infantry Replacement Training Center.

In 1942, after the American entry into World War II, Reinhardt attended the Divisional Commanders Course at the U.S. Army Command and General Staff School at Fort Leavenworth, Kansas and was then promoted to the two-star rank of major general on April 17, 1942, and also appointed the first CG of 76th Infantry Division.

From December 7, 1942, to December 1943, Reinhardt commanded XIII Corps.

In September 1944 he was appointed commander of the 69th Infantry Division (United States) at Camp Shelby, Mississippi. The division was sent to the Western Front in the European Theater of Operations (ETO) in December 1944 and entered combat in January 1945 when it relieved the battered 99th Division in Belgium. The division then attacked rapidly eastward, crossed the Rhine on March 27, 1945, and captured Leipzig in mid-April.

On April 25, 1945, during the Allies' rapid advance into Germany and towards the end of World War II in Europe, elements of the 69th Division reached the Elbe and became the first American unit to come into contact with the Soviet Red Army. After the end of the war the division was placed on occupation duty in Germany.

Reinhardt returned to the United States in August 1945 and commanded the Infantry Replacement Training Center at Camp Robinson, Arkansas. He served in this capacity until September 30, 1946, when he retired from the military service.

== Postwar ==
For his service during World War II, Major General Emil Reinhardt was awarded with Army Distinguished Service Medal, Bronze Star with oak leaf cluster, French Legion of Honour, Grade Officer, French Croix de Guerre 1939–1945 with Palm and Soviet Order of Suvorov, 2nd Class.

Reinhardt died in San Antonio, Texas on July 24, 1969, aged 80. He was buried at Fort Sam Houston National Cemetery together with his wife Laura Bishop Reinhardt (1887–1965).

== Awards and honors ==
Major General Emil Reinhardt's ribbon bar:

1st Row	Army Distinguished Service Medal	Bronze Star with Oak Leaf Cluster	World War I Victory Medal	Army of Occupation of Germany Medal
2nd Row	American Defense Service Medal	American Campaign Medal	European–African–Middle Eastern Campaign Medal with three service stars	World War II Victory Medal
3rd Row	Army of Occupation Medal	Officer of the Legion of Honour	French Croix de Guerre 1939–1945 with Palm	Order of Suvorov Second Class (Union of Soviet Socialist Republics)

== In film ==
Emil F. Reinhardt was portrayed by Stephen Lang in the 2016 World War II film Beyond Valkyrie: Dawn of the 4th Reich.

Military offices
Preceded by Newly activated post	Commanding General 76th Infantry Division; June 1942 – December 1942	Succeeded by William R. Schmidt
Preceded by Newly activated post	Commanding General XIII Corps; 1942–1943	Succeeded by Alvan C. Gillem
Preceded by Daniel I. Sultan	Commanding General VIII Corps; 1943–1944	Succeeded by Troy H. Middleton
Preceded by Charles H. White	Commanding General IX Corps; March–September 1944	Succeeded by Charles W. Ryder
Preceded by Charles L. Bolte	Commanding General 69th Infantry Division; 1944–1945	Succeeded by Robert V. Maraist
