= 69th Infantry Division (United States) =

- Shoulder sleeve insignia
- Active: 14 January 1943–18 September 1945; 23 April 1954–16 March 1956
- Country: United States
- Branch: United States Army
- Type: Infantry
- Size: Division
- Nickname: "Fighting Sixty-Ninth"
- Engagements: World War II; Rhineland; Central Europe

Insignia
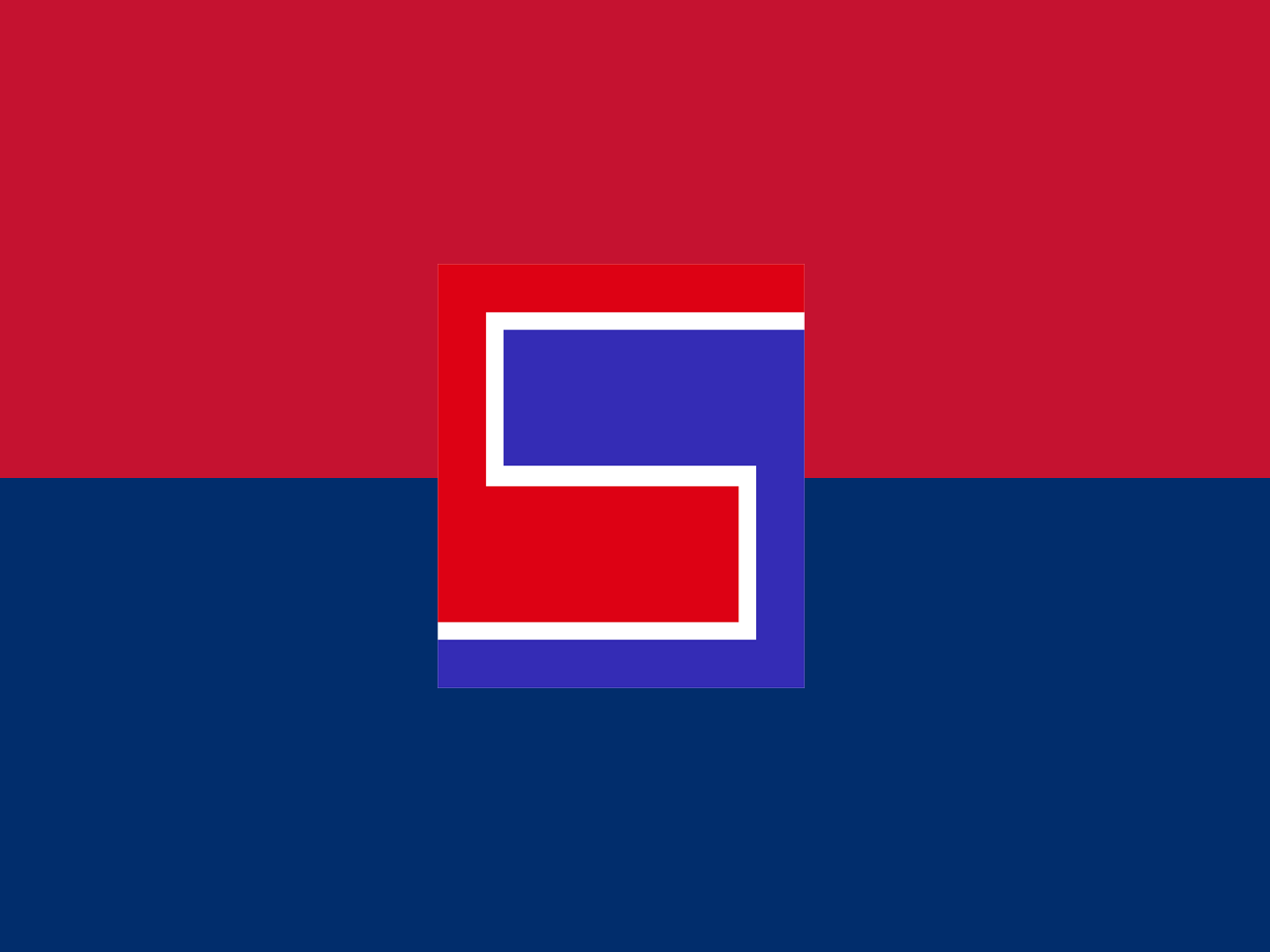
- Flag of the United States Army 69th Infantry Division

The 69th Infantry Division, nicknamed the "fighting 69th," was a Division of the United States Army formed during World War II. It is distinct from the 69th Infantry Regiment (New York) (the "Fighting 69th").

The shoulder sleeve insignia of the division was designed by its then commander Maj. Gen. Charles L. Bolte with the red, white, and blue being the colors of the United States forming a "6" and a "9".

== History ==
=== World War II ===
- Activated: 15 May 1943. Camp Shelby, Mississippi
- Overseas: December 1944.
- Campaigns: Rhineland, Central Europe
- Days of combat: 86.
- Awards:
  - Distinguished Service Cross-5
  - Distinguished Service Medal (U.S. Army)-1
  - Silver Star Medal-105
  - Legion of Merit Medal-3
  - Soldier's Medal-12
  - Bronze Star Medal-2,253
  - Air Medal-33.
- Commanders:
  - Maj. Gen. Charles L. Bolte (May 1943 – September 1944),
  - Maj. Gen. Emil F. Reinhardt (September 1944 – August 1945),
  - Brig. Gen. Robert V. Maraist (August 1945 to inactivation).
- Returned to U.S.: 13 September 1945.
- Inactivated: 16 September 1945. Camp Kilmer, New Jersey

==== Division organization ====
The 69th Infantry Division was activated in the Army of the United States on 15 May 1943 and consisted of the following units.

69th Infantry Division organization (click to enlarge)

- 69th Infantry Division
  - 69th Infantry Division Headquarters
  - 69th Cavalry Reconnaissance Troop (Mechanized) (M3 scout cars and then M8 Greyhound armored cars)
  - 271st Infantry Regiment
    - Headquarters and Headquarters Company
    - 3× Infantry battalions
      - each battalion consists of: 1× Headquarters and Headquarters Company, 3× Rifle companies, 1× Heavy Weapons Company
    - Cannon Company (T12 Gun Motor Carriages and T19 Howitzer Motor Carriages, later replaced by either M3 105mm towed howitzers or M7 Priest self propelled howitzers)
    - Anti-Tank Company (M3 37mm anti-tank guns, which were replaced by 1944 with M1 57mm anti-tank guns)
    - Service Company
  - 272nd Infantry Regiment
    - same organization as 271st Infantry Regiment
  - 273rd Infantry Regiment
    - same organization as 271st Infantry Regiment
  - 69th Infantry Division Artillery
    - Headquarters and Headquarters Battery
    - 724th Field Artillery Battalion
      - Headquarters and Headquarters Battery
      - 3× Batteries (M1 155mm towed howitzers)
      - Service Battery
    - 879th Field Artillery Battalion
      - Headquarters and Headquarters Battery
      - 3× Batteries (M2 105mm towed howitzers)
      - Service Battery
    - 880th Field Artillery Battalion
      - same organization as 879th Field Artillery Battalion
    - 881st Field Artillery Battalion
      - same organization as 879th Field Artillery Battalion
  - Headquarters Special Troops
    - Headquarters Company, 69th Infantry Division
    - 569th Signal Company
    - 69th Quartermaster Company
    - 769th Ordnance Light Maintenance Company
    - Military Police Platoon
    - 69th Infantry Division Band (attached)
  - 269th Engineer Combat Battalion
    - Headquarters and Headquarters and Service Company
    - 3× Engineer combat companies
  - 369th Medical Battalion
    - Headquarters and Headquarters Detachment
    - 3× Collecting companies
    - Clearing Company

==== Combat chronicle ====
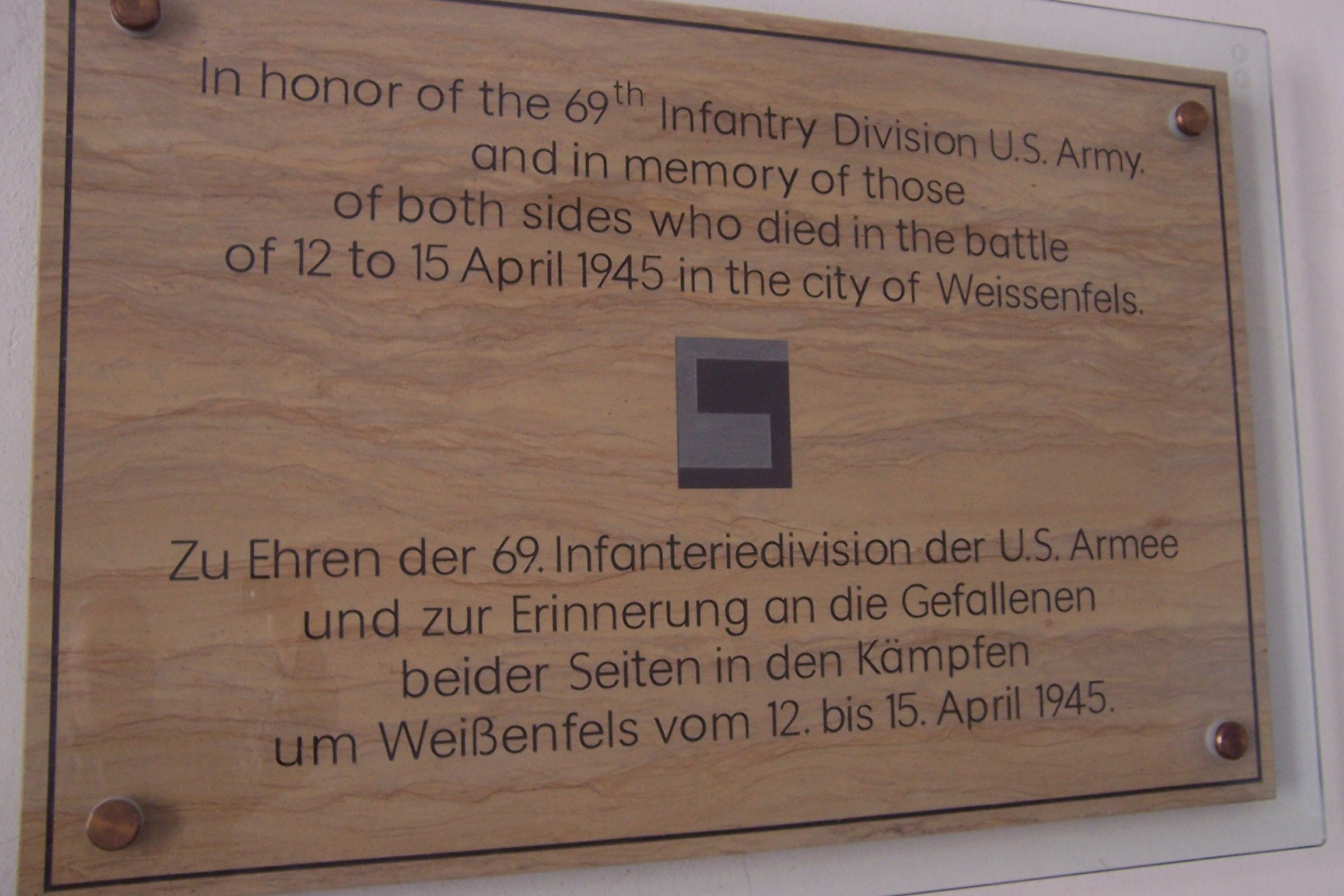
Sign at Weissenfels castle gate commemorating the taking of the town in April 1945

The 69th Infantry Division arrived in England, on 12 December 1944, where it continued its training.

It landed in Le Havre, France, on 24 January 1945, and moved to Belgium to relieve the 99th Division, on 12 February, and hold defensive positions in the Siegfried Line. The division went over to the attack, on 27 February, capturing the high ridge east of Prether to facilitate use of the Hellenthal-Hollerath Highway.

In a rapid advance to the east, the 69th took Schmidtheim and Dahlem, 7 March. The period from 9 to 21 March was spent in mopping up activities and training. The division resumed its forward movement to the west bank of the Rhine, crossing the river and capturing the fortress of Ehrenbreitstein, on 27 March.

It relieved the 80th Division in Kassel, 7 April, seized Hannoversch Münden on the 8th and Weissenfels on the 14th against sharp opposition, and captured Leipzig, 19 April, following a fierce struggle within the city. Eilenburg fell, 23 April, and the east bank of the Mulde River was secured.

Two days later, division patrols in the area between the Elbe and the Mulde Rivers contacted elements of the Soviet 5th Guards Army at Strehla, in the vicinity of Riesa and again at Torgau on Elbe Day. Until VE-day, the 69th patrolled and policed its area. Occupation duties were given to the division until it left for home and inactivation on 7 September.

==== Casualties ====
- Total battle casualties: 1,506
- Killed in action: 341
- Wounded in action: 1,146
- Missing in action: 9
- Prisoner of war: 10

=== Training division ===
In 1954 the 69th Division was reactivated under Major General Cornelius E. Ryan as a training division at Fort Dix, New Jersey replacing the 9th Infantry Division that was sent to Europe. the 69th was deactivated in March 1956. The shoulder patch of the 69th was worn by the actors playing soldiers on The Phil Silvers Show.

== See also ==
- Elbe Bridge handshake photograph
