= 13th Armored Division (United States) =

- 13th Armored Division shoulder sleeve insignia
- Active: 9 June 1942–15 November 1945; 20 August 1947–1 March 1952
- Country: United States
- Branch: United States Army
- Type: Armor
- Role: Armored warfare
- Size: Division
- Nickname: "The Black Cats"
- Engagements: World War II; Rhineland; Central Europe

Commanders
- Notable commanders: MG John B. Wogan (1942–45); MG John Millikin (1945)
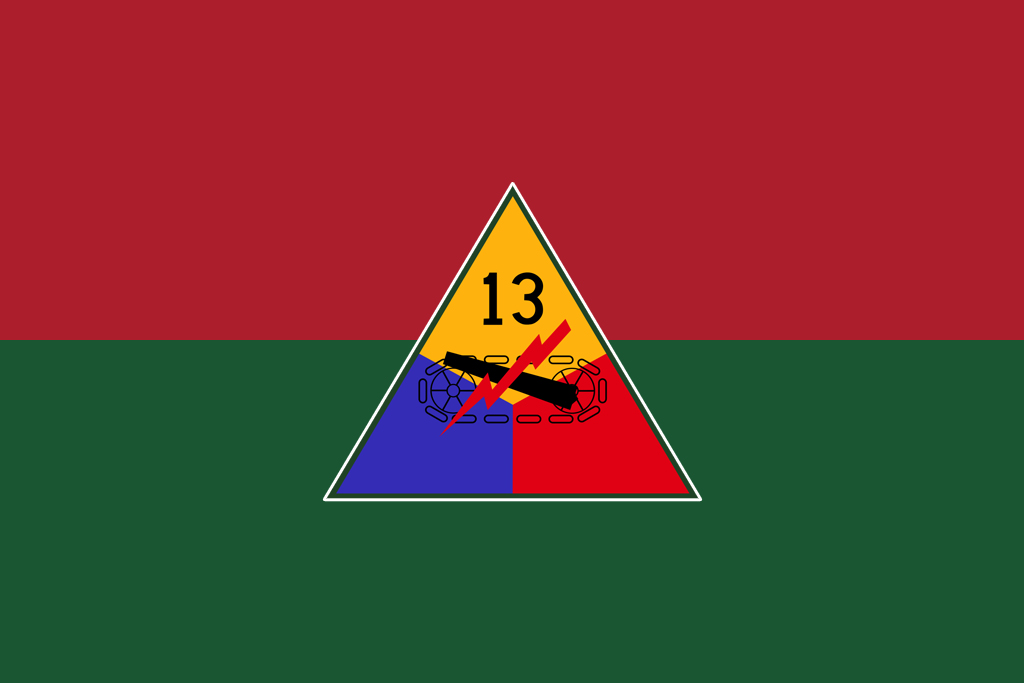
- Flag of the United States Army 13th Armored Division

The 13th Armored Division was an armored division of the United States Army in World War II.

== History and combat chronicle ==
The division was constituted in the Army of the United States on 9 June 1942 and activated on 15 October 1942 at Camp Beale, east of Marysville, California. During training, the division adopted the nickname "Black Cats." The division landed at Le Havre, France, 29 January 1945. After performing occupation duties, the division moved to Homberg near Kassel to prepare for combat under the Third Army, 5 April. At Altenkirchen, it was attached to the XVIII Airborne Corps and prepared for the Ruhr Pocket operation. The attack jumped off at Honnef, 10 April. After crossing the river Sieg at Siegburg, the 13th pushed north to Bergisch Gladbach, then toward Duisburg and Mettmann by 18 April.

Shifting south to Eschenau, the division prepared for Bavarian operations. Starting from Parsberg, 26 April, the 13th crossed the Regen river, then the Danube at Matting and secured the area near Dünzling. On the 28th, elements closed in at Plattling and crossed the Isar River. Moderate to heavy resistance was met during this drive through southern Germany. The division smashed into Braunau am Inn, Austria, 2 May, and the command post was set up in the house where Adolf Hitler was born. A bridgehead across the Inn was established at Marktl, but the river was not crossed as orders came to reassemble north of Inn River, 2 May.

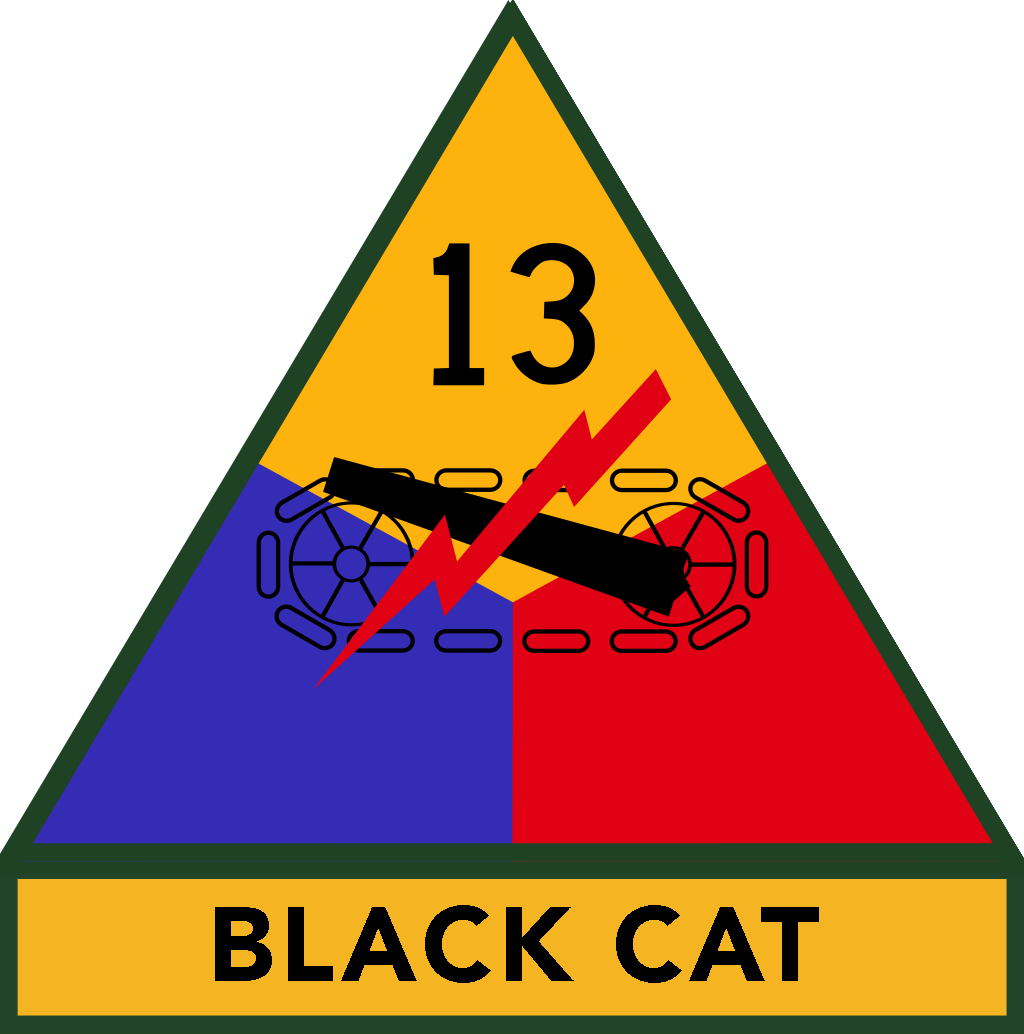
13th Armored Division "Black Cat" Insignia

Preparations were made for further advances when the war in Europe ended. The 13th remained in Germany until 25 June and left Le Havre, France, for home, 14 July 1945.

The division moved to Camp Cooke, California, after returning to the United States. It commenced training in amphibious operations, and the men were aware that it was an open secret that they were likely to participate in the invasion of mainland Japan. After the Japanese surrender, it was inactivated on 15 November 1945.

On 20 August 1947, the 13th Armored Division was allotted to the Organized Reserve (redesignated 25 March 1948 as the Organized Reserve Corps, and redesignated 9 July 1952 as the Army Reserve) and activated by reflagging it from the 19th Armored Division, which had been allotted to the Sixth Army area of the Organized Reserve, specifically California, Oregon, and Arizona. The 13th Armored Division was inactivated on 1 March 1952, and withdrawn from the Army Reserve and allotted to the Regular Army on 25 February 1953. In 1947, the 19th Armored Division was reflagged as the 13th Armored Division at California's request. In 1952, the division was reflagged as the 63rd Infantry Division in Los Angeles, California, and thus the 13th Armored Division was finally inactivated.

== Division organization ==
=== Heavy armored division ===
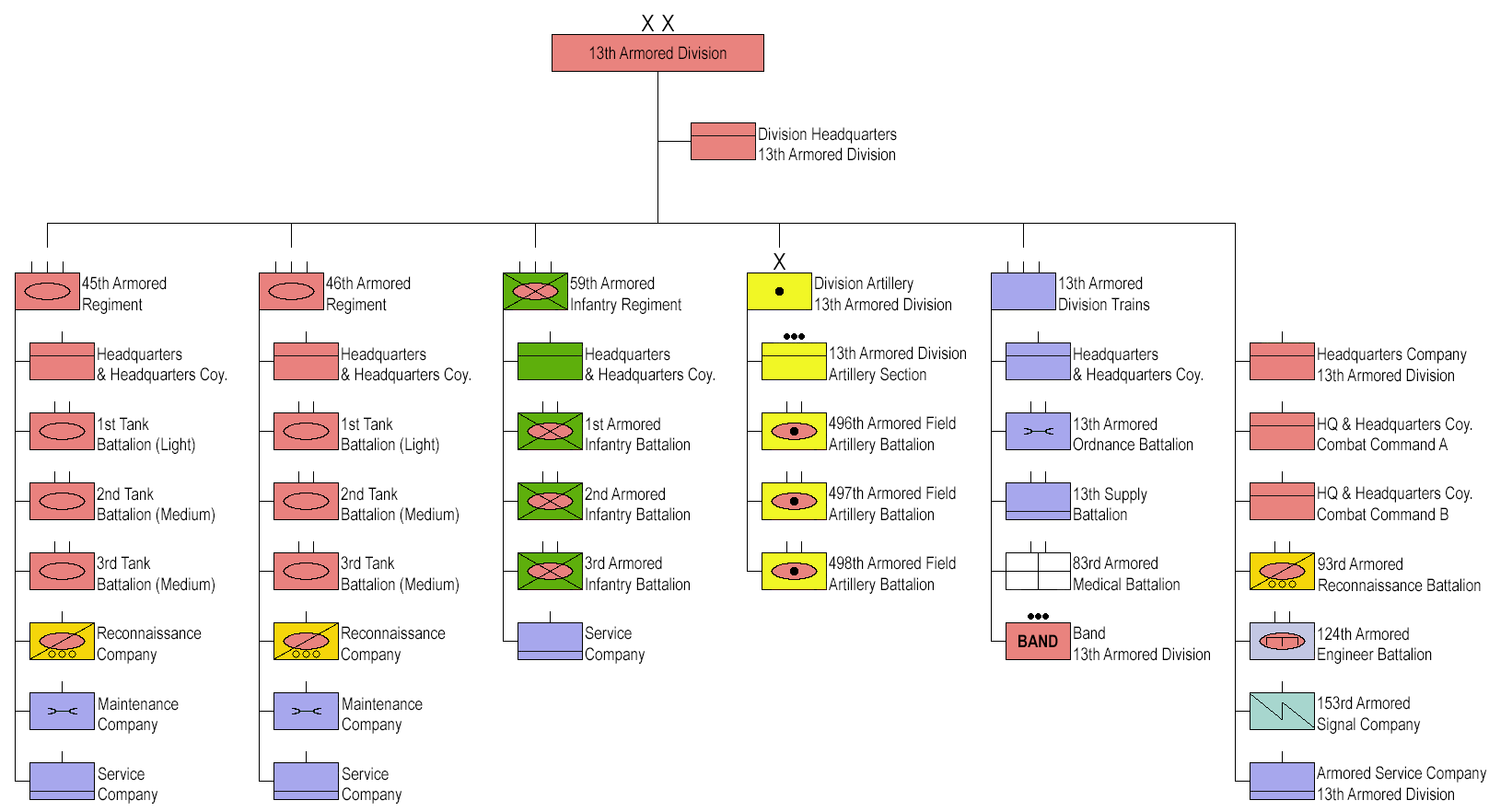
13th Armored Division organization after the division's activation (click to enlarge)

The division was activated as a heavy armored division in 1942. At the time the 13th Armored Division was composed of the following units:

- 13th Armored Division
  - Division Headquarters
  - Headquarters Company, 13th Armored Division
  - Headquarters and Headquarters Company, Combat Command A
  - Headquarters and Headquarters Company, Combat Command B
  - 153rd Armored Signal Company
  - Armored Service Company (includes the division's Military Police Platoon)
  - 45th Armored Regiment
    - Headquarters and Headquarters Company
    - Reconnaissance Company (M3 scout cars and T30 HMC self propelled guns)
    - Maintenance Company
    - Service Company
    - 1st Tank Battalion (Light)
      - Headquarters and Headquarters Company
      - 3× Light Tank companies (A, B, C) (M3/M5 Stuart light tanks)
    - 2nd Tank Battalion (Medium)
      - Headquarters and Headquarters Company
      - 3× Medium Tank companies (D, E, F) (M4 Sherman tanks)
    - 3rd Tank Battalion (Medium)
      - Headquarters and Headquarters Company
      - 3× Medium Tank companies (G, H, I) (M4 Sherman tanks)
  - 46th Armored Regiment
    - same organization as 45th Armored Regiment
  - 59th Armored Infantry Regiment
    - Headquarters and Headquarters Company
    - 3× Armored infantry battalions
      - each battalion consists of: 1× Headquarters and Headquarters Company, 3× Rifle companies on M3 half-tracks
    - Service Company
  - 93rd Armored Reconnaissance Battalion
    - Headquarters and Headquarters Company
    - 3× Reconnaissance companies (M3 scout cars)
    - Light Tank Company (M3/M5 Stuart light tanks)
  - 124th Armored Engineer Battalion
    - Headquarters and Headquarters Company
    - 4× Armored engineer companies
    - Bridge Company
  - 13th Armored Division Artillery
    - 13th Armored Division Artillery Section
    - 496th Armored Field Artillery Battalion
      - Headquarters and Headquarters Battery
      - 3× Field artillery batteries (M7 Priest self propelled howitzers)
      - Service Battery
    - 497th Armored Field Artillery Battalion
      - same organization as 496th Armored Field Artillery Battalion
    - 498th Armored Field Artillery Battalion
      - same organization as 496th Armored Field Artillery Battalion
  - 13th Armored Division Trains
    - Headquarters and Headquarters Company
    - 14th Armored Ordnance Battalion
      - Headquarters and Headquarters Company
      - 3× Maintenance companies
    - 14th Supply Battalion
      - Headquarters and Headquarters Company
      - 2× Truck companies
    - 83rd Armored Medical Battalion
      - Headquarters and Headquarters Company
      - 3× Medical companies
    - 13th Armored Division Band

=== Light armored division ===
Early in 1943, the Army Ground Force began a series of studies to reorganize the various divisions within the Army. After reviewing the tables of organization and after allowing the various commands to review and comment on the proposed restructure, the War Department published on 15 September 1943 a new armored division tables of organization. The restructuring removed the two armored regiments and armored infantry regiment from the table of organization and replaced them with three tank battalions and three armored infantry battalions. Each tank battalion included one light and three medium tank companies. Both Combat Commands, A and B, remained, but an additional Reserve Command was added to the organization. This was a small headquarters element of 10 personnel tasked to clarify command and control in the division's rear area. Armored engineer battalions lost their bridge companies, while their engineer companies were reduced from four to three. The division's cavalry reconnaissance squadron was increased in size to include an HQ Troop, four reconnaissance troops, a light tank company, and an assault gun troop of four platoons (one for each reconnaissance troop). Within the division trains, the division lost its supply battalion and the division's armored service company. These changes pared the division's strength from 14,630 men to 10,937, slashed the number of tanks from 360 to 263, reduced the variety of vehicles to ease repair problems, and eliminated the maintenance-prone motorcycles.

After its reorganization as a light armored division the 13th Armored Division was composed of the following units:

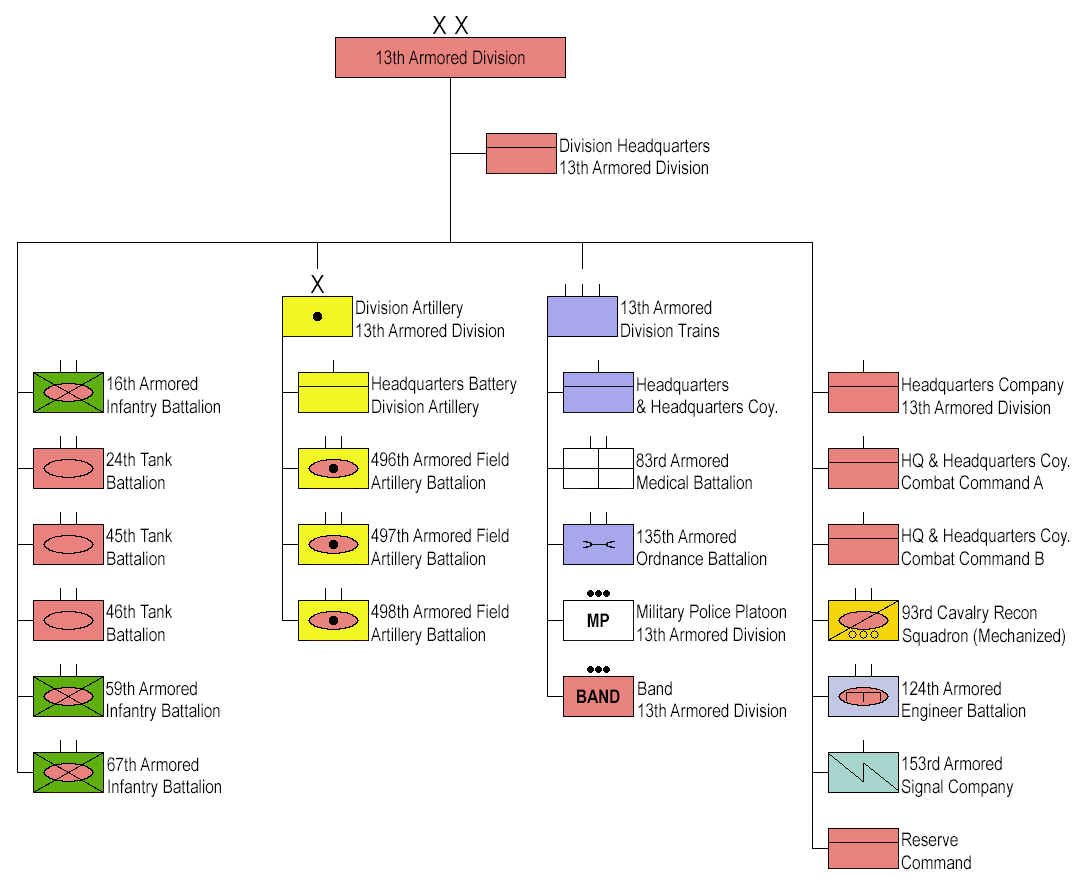
13th Armored Division organization after the division's reorganization (click to enlarge)

- 13th Armored Division
  - Division Headquarters
  - Headquarters Company, 13th Armored Division
  - Headquarters and Headquarters Company, Combat Command A
  - Headquarters and Headquarters Company, Combat Command B
  - 153rd Armored Signal Company
  - Reserve Command
  - 24th Tank Battalion
    - Headquarters and Headquarters Company
    - 3× Medium Tank companies (M4 Sherman tanks)
    - Light Tank Company (M3/M5 Stuart or M24 Chaffee light tanks)
    - Service Company
  - 45th Tank Battalion
    - same organization as 24th Tank Battalion
  - 46th Tank Battalion
    - same organization as 24th Tank Battalion
  - 16th Armored Infantry Battalion
    - Headquarters and Headquarters Company
    - 3× Rifle companies (M3 half-tracks)
    - Service Company
  - 59th Armored Infantry Battalion
    - same organization as 16th Armored Infantry Battalion
  - 67th Armored Infantry Battalion
    - same organization as 16th Armored Infantry Battalion
  - 93rd Cavalry Reconnaissance Squadron (Mechanized)
    - Headquarters and Headquarters and Service Troop
    - 4× Cavalry reconnaissance troops (M8 Greyhound armored cars)
    - Cavalry Assault Gun Troop (M8 Scott self propelled guns)
    - Light Tank Company (M3/M5 Stuart or M24 Chaffee light tanks)
  - 124th Armored Engineer Battalion
    - Headquarters and Headquarters Company
    - 3× Armored engineer companies
  - 13th Armored Division Artillery
    - Headquarters and Headquarters Battery
    - 496th Armored Field Artillery Battalion
      - Headquarters and Headquarters Battery
      - 3× Field artillery batteries (M7 Priest self propelled howitzers)
      - Service Battery
    - 497th Armored Field Artillery Battalion
      - same organization as 496th Armored Field Artillery Battalion
    - 498th Armored Field Artillery Battalion
      - same organization as 496th Armored Field Artillery Battalion
  - 13th Armored Division Trains
    - Headquarters and Headquarters Company
    - 83rd Armored Medical Battalion
      - Headquarters and Headquarters Company
      - 3× Medical companies
    - 135th Armored Ordnance Battalion
      - Headquarters and Headquarters Company
      - 3× Maintenance companies
    - Military Police Platoon
    - 13th Armored Division Band

== Statistics ==
=== Casualties ===
- Total battle casualties: 1,176
- Killed in action: 214
- Wounded in action: 912
- Missing in action: 16
- Prisoner of war: 34

=== Awards ===
Campaigns

- Rhineland
- Central Europe

Individual Awards

- Distinguished Service Cross: 2
- Silver Star: 6
- Bronze Star: 102
