= Robert V. Maraist =

United States Army general

Robert Victor Maraist
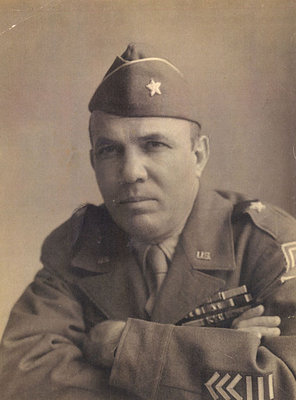
- Brigadier general Maraist on wartime photo.
- Born: 28 February 1893; St. Martin Parish, Louisiana, U.S.
- Died: 18 February 1961 (aged 67)
- Burial place: Saint Michaels Cemetery, St. Martin Parish, Louisiana, U.S.
- Military career
- Allegiance: United States
- Branch: United States Army
- Rank: Brigadier General
- Commands: 69th Infantry Division
- Conflicts: World War I; World War II; Operation Torch; Battle of the Kasserine Pass; Siegfried Line
- Awards: Silver Star (2); Bronze Star Medal (2); Legion of Merit (2)

Robert Victor Maraist (February 28, 1893 – February 18, 1961) was a brigadier general in the United States Army, the last commander of the 69th Infantry Division during World War II. After the war, he became Director of New Orleans Civil Defense.

== Early life ==
Robert Victor Maraist was born on February 28, 1893, in St. Martin Parish, Louisiana. He enlisted in the United States Army and served in the Great War with distinction and received French Croix de guerre 1914–1918 with Palm. Maraist subsequently served with occupation forces in Germany. After returning to the United States, Maraist married Evelyn Mary Fournet on June 24, 1920.

After the war, Maraist stayed in the army and served at several military camps, including Fort Myer, Virginia.

== Second World War ==
In 1940, Maraist was appointed as Commanding Officer of 27th Armored Field Artillery Battalion. Two years later, Colonel Maraist was promoted to the capacity of Commanding Officer of Artillery of the 1st Armored Division under command of Major general Orlando Ward. Maraist earned two Silver stars during fighting in Tunisia with 1st Armored.

In July 1943, Maraist was transferred to the newly formed 16th Armored Division at Camp Chaffee, Arkansas, to retake command of its Combat Command Group. The division was in the command of Major General Douglass T. Greene at that time.

Maraist spent six months with the division before he was transferred again, this time to the 69th Infantry division, where he retook the post of Divisional Artillery Commander. Maraist arrived with his 69th Infantry Division in Europe at the beginning of December, 1944. Maraist spent the rest of the war as a Divisional Artillery Commander and eventually was appointed as a new 69th Divisional Commander, when he replaced Major General Emil F. Reinhardt in August, 1945.

== Life after War ==
Maraist stayed in command of 69th Infantry division until its deactivation in September, 1945. Then Brigadier general Maraist returned to the United States and became a Civil Defense Director in New Orleans.

In this capacity, Maraist strongly advocated preparing the civilian population to withstand nuclear attack and proposed the construction of fallout shelters in public buildings like schools and hospitals. Maraist retired from the Army in 1953.

Brigadier general Robert Victor Maraist died on 18 February 1961.

== Decorations ==
Brigadier General Maraist's decorations included: Silver Star with Oak Leaf Cluster, Legion of Merit with Oak Leaf Cluster, Bronze Star with Oak Leaf Cluster, Army Commendation Ribbon with Oak Leaf Cluster, World War I Victory Medal, Army of Occupation of Germany Medal, American Defense Service Medal, American Campaign Medal, European-African-Middle Eastern Campaign Medal, World War II Victory Medal, Army of Occupation Medal, National Defense Service Medal, French Croix de guerre 1914–1918 with Palm and the Order of Kutuzov Second Class from the Union of Soviet Socialist Republics.

Brigadier General Maraist's ribbon bar:

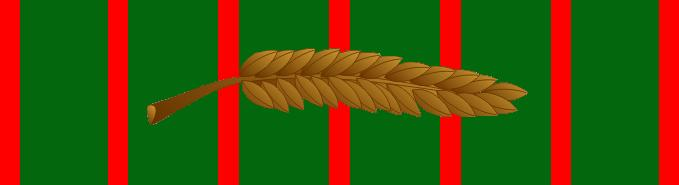

Military offices
Preceded by Emil F. Reinhardt	Commanding General 69th Infantry Division; August 1945 – September 1945	Succeeded by Post deactivated
