= Charles L. Bolte =

United States Army general (1895–1989)

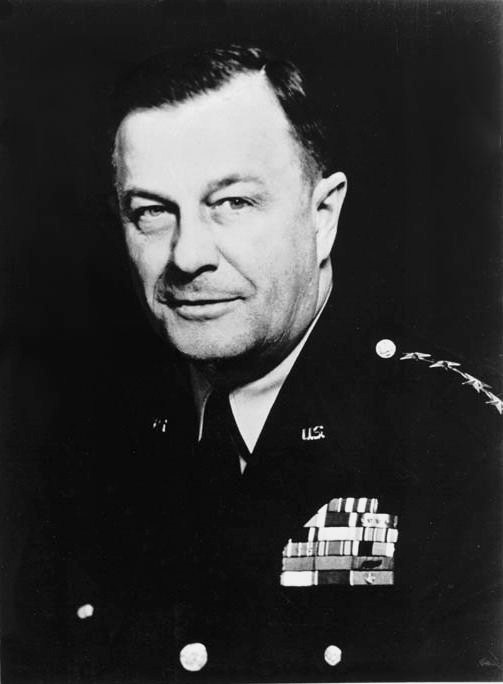
- Born: 8 May 1895; Chicago, Illinois, United States
- Died: 11 February 1989 (aged 93); Alexandria, Virginia, United States
- Burial place: Arlington National Cemetery, Virginia, United States
- Military career
- Allegiance: United States
- Branch: United States Army
- Service years: 1916–1955
- Rank: General
- Service number: 0-6908
- Unit: Infantry Branch
- Commands: Vice Chief of Staff of the United States Army; United States Army Europe; Seventh United States Army; 69th Infantry Division; 34th Infantry Division; 3rd Battalion, 13th Infantry Regiment
- Conflicts: World War I World War II
- Awards: Army Distinguished Service Medal (2); Silver Star; Legion of Merit; Purple Heart

General Charles Lawrence Bolte (8 May 1895 – 11 February 1989) was a senior United States Army officer who fought in both World War I and World War II. In World War II he distinguished himself as commander of the 34th Infantry Division during the Italian Campaign, for which he was twice awarded the Army Distinguished Service Medal. Later promoted to four-star general officer rank, his final post was Vice Chief of Staff of the United States Army.

== Early life and military career ==
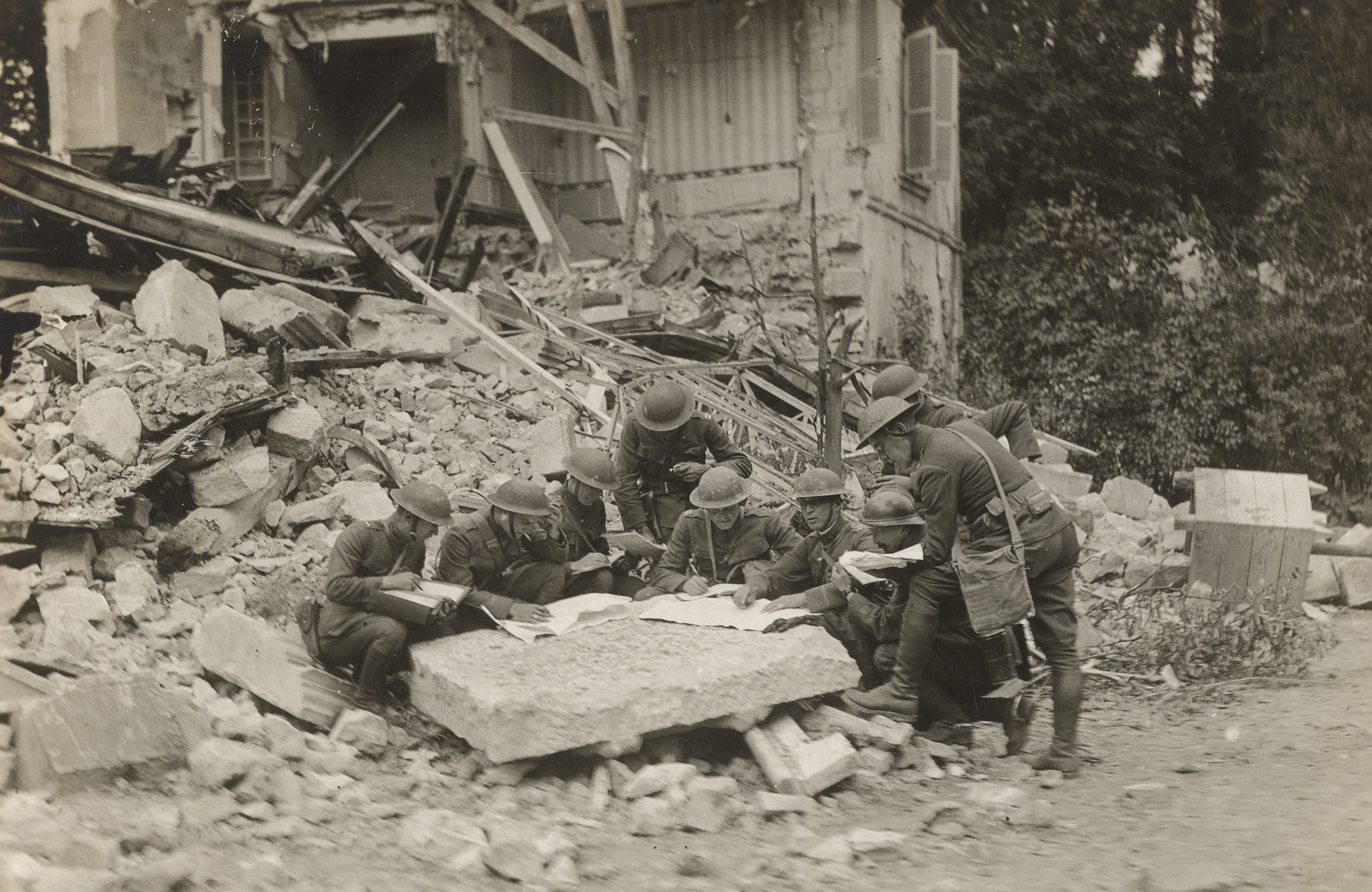
Senior officers and staff of the 58th Infantry, 4th Division, consulting a sector map of the locality in which they are operating, France, 9 August 1918. First Lieutenant Charles L. Bolte, then the regiment's intelligence officer, is third from the left

Bolte graduated from what is today the Illinois Institute of Technology with a degree in chemical engineering. He began his military career in 1916, during World War I (although the United States was still officially neutral at this stage), when he earned a commission as a second lieutenant into the United States Army's Infantry Branch.

Two years later in 1918, after the American entry into World War I, which occurred on 6 April 1917, Bolte shipped off for the Western Front to reinforce the American Expeditionary Force under General John J. Pershing. Serving as a company commander in the 58th Infantry Regiment, part of the 4th Division, he saw combat in the Battle of Saint-Mihiel and the Meuse–Argonne offensive, where he was wounded in action on 19 September.

== Between the wars ==
In August 1919, Bolte returned to the United States as a captain, nine months after the war came to an end on 11 November 1918 at 11:00am. In 1923, he married Adelaide Carleton Poore, the daughter of Major General Benjamin A. Poore. They were the parents of three children— Colonel David E., Brigadier General Philip L., and daughter Damara.

Bolte remained in the army during the interwar period and completed the Infantry Advanced Course at Fort Benning, Georgia in 1930, graduated in 1932 from the United States Army Command and General Staff College, and was ordered to the American Barracks, Tientsin, China for duty with the 15th Infantry Regiment as S-3 company and battalion commander. In April 1936, back in the United States, Bolte was assigned to command a battalion of the 13th Infantry Regiment at Fort Devens, Massachusetts. The following August, he entered the United States Army War College, graduated in June 1937, and remained there as an instructor until 1940, during World War II, although the United States was not yet involved in the war. On August 18, 1940, he was promoted to lieutenant colonel.

== World War II ==
In 1941, Bolte, by now a colonel (having been promoted on 24 December 1941), journeyed to London as head of a group of army observers and, early in 1942, after the United States had entered World War II due to the Japanese attack on Pearl Harbor followed by the German declaration of war on the United States, assumed the position of chief of staff of U.S. Forces in the United Kingdom, with the one-star general officer rank of brigadier general. Promoted on 26 April 1943, to the two-star rank of major general, he returned to the United States in 1943 and raised and commanded the 69th Infantry Division in Mississippi.

In July 1944, upon the request of Lieutenant General Mark W. Clark, commanding the American Fifth Army on the Italian Front he was sent to Italy where he took over command of the 34th Infantry Division (nicknamed "The Red Bull"), an Army National Guard formation, then locked in fierce combat on the Arno River. He replaced Major General Charles W. Ryder, who had led the 34th Division for over two years. He led the 34th through several successful actions, including the rupture of the Gothic Line, the winter campaign in the Apennine Mountains, the breakthrough and the capture of the Italian city of Bologna in Operation Grapeshot (codename for the final offensive of the Italian Campaign), the surrender of the Axis forces in Italy on 29 April 1945, and the subsequent occupation of the Northwestern and then the Northeastern sectors of Italy. The end of World War II in Europe came soon afterwards.

Bolte earned two Army Distinguished Service Medals, the Silver Star, the Legion of Merit and the Purple Heart for his exploits during the war.

== Postwar ==
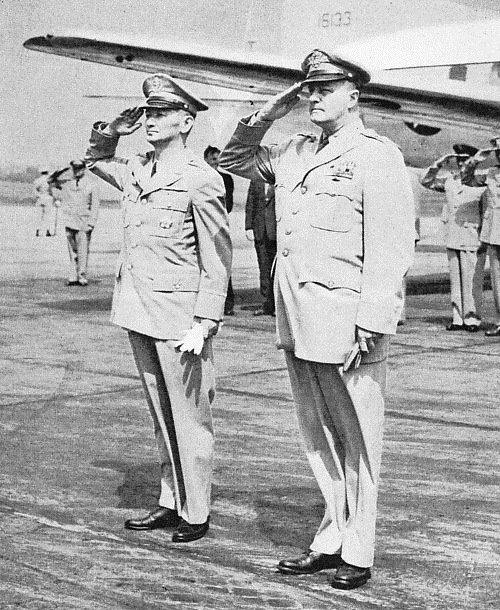
General Keizō Hayashi, Chairman of Japan Self-Defense Forces' Joint Staff Council (left) and General Charles L. Bolte, Vice Chief of Staff of the United States Army (right), July 1954

Bolte served in Washington after the war and in 1953, at the three-star rank of lieutenant general, he became Commanding General (CG) of United States Army Europe. Later that year, Bolte returned home to serve as Vice Chief of Staff of the United States Army under General Matthew Bunker Ridgway who, like Bolte, had also had a distinguished war record. Bolte retired from active service in 1955 as a full general.

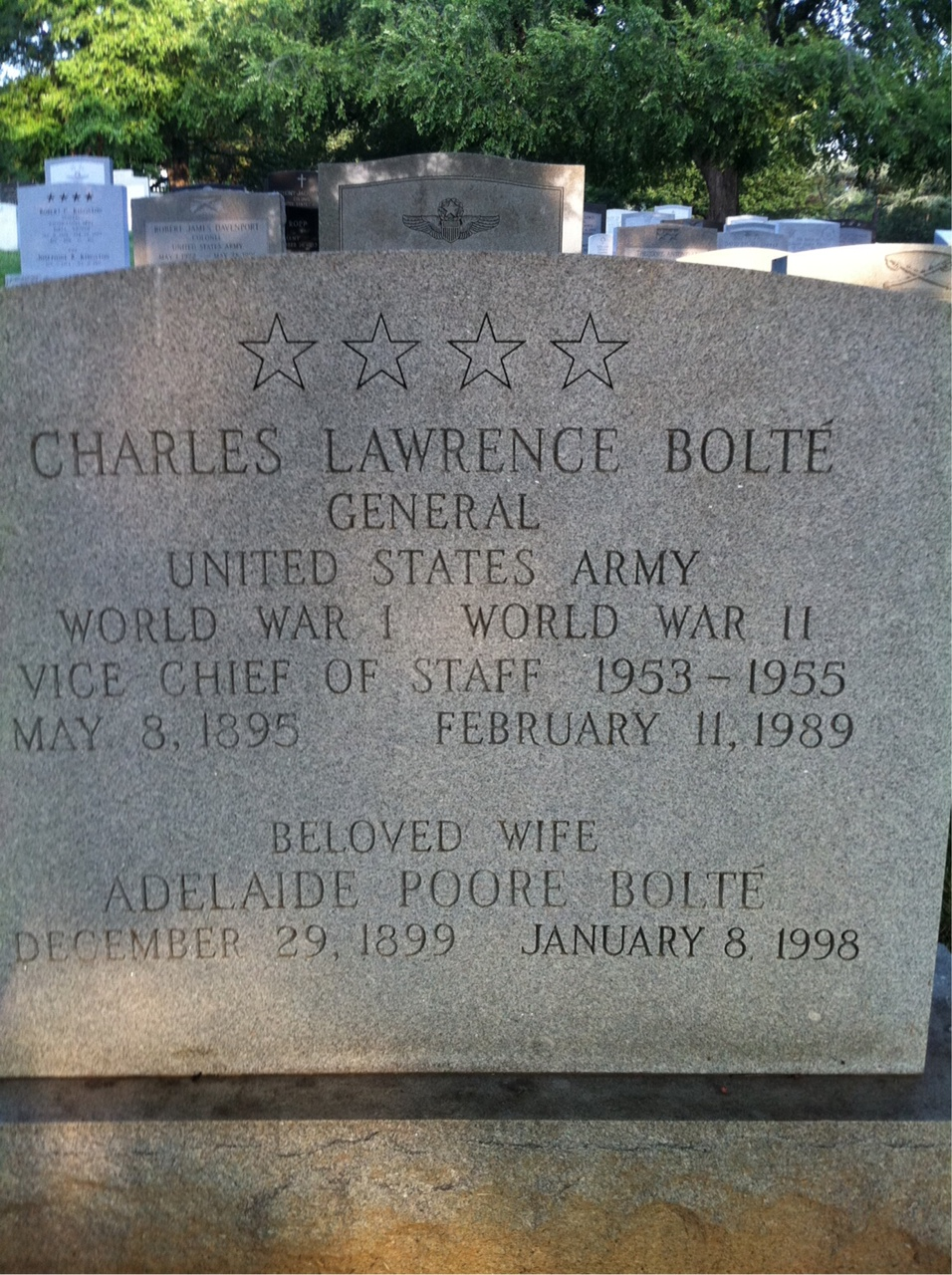
The grave of General Charles L. Bolte at Arlington National Cemetery

Following retirement, he worked as special assistant to the chairman of the board of American Car & Foundry Industries from 1955 to 1958. He then became chairman of the Board of Advanced Growth Capital Corporation, retiring from this in the 1960s. He was also active in charitable work, and served as President of the Army & Navy Club. He died on 11 February 1989, at Mount Vernon Hospital, Virginia, after a stroke, and was buried in Arlington National Cemetery.

== Dates of rank ==
Insignia	Rank	Component	Date
	Second lieutenant	Officers Reserve Corps	23 December 1916 (Active duty on 8 May 1917)
	Second lieutenant	Regular Army	10 November 1917
	First lieutenant	Regular Army	25 October 1917
	Captain	Regular Army	19 September 1918 (Date of rank was 10 August 1918)
	Major	Regular Army	1 August 1935
	Lieutenant colonel	Regular Army	18 August 1940
	Colonel	Army of the United States	24 December 1941
	Brigadier general	Army of the United States	17 January 1942
	Major general	Army of the United States	26 April 1943
	Colonel	Regular Army	1 September 1946
	Brigadier general	Regular Army	24 January 1948
	Major general	Army of the United States	24 January 1948 (Date of rank was 5 October 1944)
	Lieutenant general	Army of the United States	13 February 1951
	General	Army of the United States	30 July 1953
	General	Regular Army, Retired	30 June 1955

Military offices
New command	Commanding General 69th Infantry Division; 1943–1944	Succeeded by Emil F. Reinhardt
Preceded by Charles W. Ryder	Commanding General 34th Infantry Division; 1944–1945	Post deactivated
Preceded by Manton S. Eddy	Commanding General Seventh Army; 1952–1953	Succeeded by William M. Hoge
Preceded by Manton S. Eddy	Commanding General United States Army Europe; April – September 1953	Succeeded by William M. Hoge
Preceded by John E. Hull	Vice Chief of Staff of the United States Army; 1953–1955	Succeeded by Williston B. Palmer
