= Charles W. Ryder Jr. =

United States Army general

Charles Wolcott Ryder Jr.
- Born: November 20, 1920
- Died: March 28, 2010 (aged 89)
- Relatives: Charles Wolcott Ryder Sr. (Father)
- Military career
- Allegiance: United States of America
- Branch: United States Army
- Service years: 1942–1977
- Rank: Major General
- Unit: Infantry Branch
- Commands: 199th Infantry Brigade
- Conflicts: World War II; Vietnam War
- Awards: Distinguished Service Medal (2); Silver Star (3); Legion of Merit (4); Distinguished Flying Cross; Bronze Star (4); Air Medal (17); Purple Heart

Charles Wolcott Ryder Jr. (November 20, 1920 – March 28, 2010) was a United States Army major general who served from 1942 through to 1977.

Ryder graduated from the United States Military Academy, class of 1942, during World War II. Served with the 90th Infantry Division in Western Europe. Graduated from the Command and General Staff College in 1953. Assigned to the Office of the Chief of Staff 1960–61. Commanding Officer 1st Brigade, 8th Infantry Division 1964–66. Commanding General, 199th Infantry Brigade, November 28, 1966 to March 1, 1967. Professor of Military Science, The Citadel, 1966–67. Aerospace Defense Command 4th Infantry Division Republic of Vietnam, 1967–68. Chief of Staff Fourth United States Army 1970–72. Chief, Joint United States Military Aid Group to Greece, Greece 1972–74, Director Logistics and Security Assistance (J-4/7) United States European Command, 1974–77.

His father, Charles Wolcott Ryder Sr., was a United States Military Academy class graduate of 1915 who served in both World War I and World War II, where he commanded the 34th Infantry Division during the Italian Campaign, before retiring as a major general.

Ryder retired from the U.S. Army in 1977. He died on March 28, 2010.
