= Charles W. Ryder =

United States Army general (1892–1960)

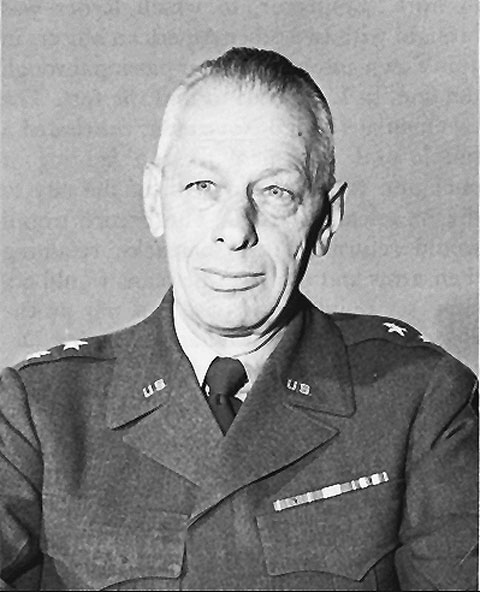
- Born: January 16, 1892; Topeka, Kansas, United States
- Died: August 17, 1960 (aged 68); Oak Bluffs, Massachusetts, United States
- Relatives: Charles W. Ryder Jr. (Son)
- Military career
- Allegiance: United States
- Branch: United States Army
- Service years: 1917–1950
- Rank: Major General
- Nickname: "Doc"
- Service number: O-3802
- Units: Infantry Branch
- Commands: 1st Battalion, 16th Infantry Regiment; 34th Infantry Division; IX Corps
- Conflicts: World War I World War II
- Awards: Distinguished Service Cross (2); Army Distinguished Service Medal (2); Silver Star (2); Legion of Merit (2); Purple Heart; World War I Victory Medal; American Campaign Medal; European–African–Middle Eastern Campaign Medal; World War II Victory Medal; Army of Occupation Medal; Order of the Bath

Major General Charles Wolcott Ryder (January 16, 1892 – August 17, 1960) was a senior United States Army officer who served with distinction in both World War I and World War II.

== Early life and military career ==
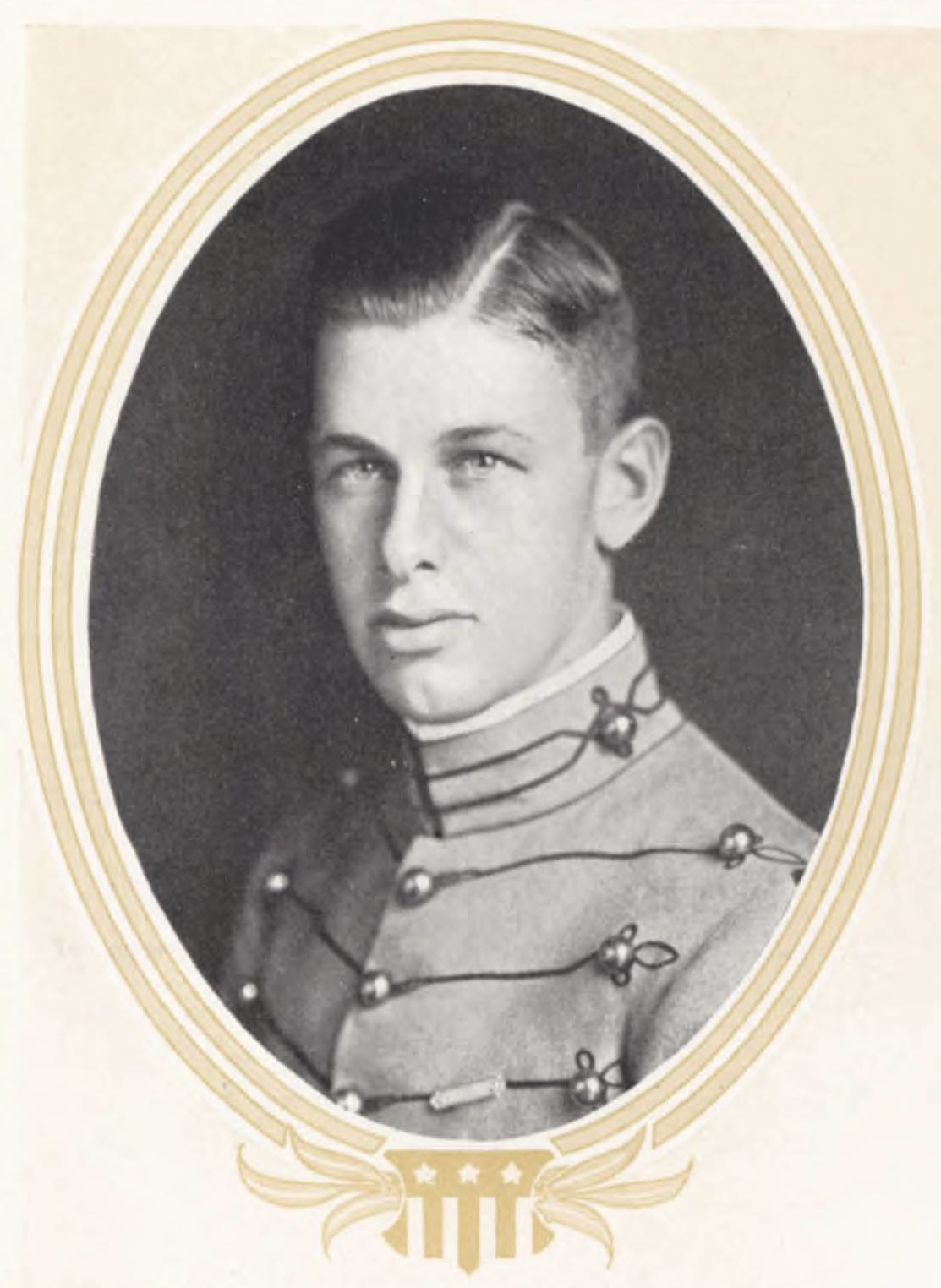
At West Point in 1915

Charles W. Ryder was born in Topeka, Kansas in mid-January 1892 and graduated from Topeka High School. In 1911 he entered the United States Military Academy (USMA), at West Point, New York. Four years later, he graduated thirty-ninth in a class of 164 as a second lieutenant in the Infantry Branch of the United States Army as part of the West Point class of 1915, also known as "the class the stars fell on". Among those he graduated with were Dwight D. Eisenhower, Omar Bradley, James Van Fleet, Joseph T. McNarney and many others who, like Ryder, would also attain general officer rank.

Ryder's first assignment was with the 30th Infantry Regiment and, later, was on border duty near Fort Sam Houston, Texas. He then served with the Reserve Officers Training Corps (ROTC) in New York and, by the time of the American entry into World War I he was a company commander in the 16th Infantry Regiment.

Ryder, together with the rest of his regiment, which was now part of the 1st Infantry Brigade of the newly created 1st Division, was sent to the Western Front and arrived there in June 1917, one of the first units of the American Expeditionary Forces (AEF) to be sent overseas in World War I. Promoted to captain in May, commanding Company 'B' of the 1st Battalion, 16th Infantry, Ryder and his regiment, not immediately engaged in combat, spent almost a year being trained in trench warfare tactics from the French Army. He was promoted to major on June 17, 1918, and assumed command of the 1st Battalion, 16th Infantry Regiment.

A month later, he led the battalion in the Battle of Soissons, suffering heavy casualties, including Ryder himself, who was wounded by German artillery but continued to lead his men. Of the 1,100 men of Ryder's battalion who went "over the top" on July 18, 1918, there were less than 50 remaining five days later. However, Ryder, in his first battle, had performed well and was awarded the Distinguished Service Cross, the nation's second highest award for valor in the face of the enemy, the Silver Citation Star and the Purple Heart.

Wounded in the heart (which would affect him for the rest of his life), he spent the next few weeks recovering in the hospital and soon returned to the command of his battalion. He again led the battalion in the Meuse-Argonne Offensive in early October 1918, where it captured Hill 272, a dominant terrain feature in the 1st Division's sector which had brought the division to a standstill for three days. After personally observing his battalion's objective, he gave verbal orders to his company commanders and outlined his plan of attack. On October 8 the division artillery concentrated fire on the hill and Ryder's battalion, with Ryder, as at Soissons, again leading from the front, attacked the hill at 8:30am the next day, under cover of a thick fog and supported by machine guns and a huge artillery barrage. Working in small units to outflank the enemy machine guns and mortars, capturing or destroying enemy positions, the battalion had, by 11:00am, secured all its objectives and captured more than 50 machine guns and began to consolidate its position. For his personal leadership in the battle Ryder was awarded with a second Distinguished Service Cross, two of twenty five to be awarded to men of the 1st Division. World War I came to an end just over a month later with the signing of the Armistice with Germany coming into effect on November 11, 1918, at 11:00am. Ryder's war was over and the personal lessons he learned would remain with him and serve him well in the future.

== Between the wars ==
After the end of the conflict Ryder remained in the army, served on occupation duties in France and Germany. Ryder had been decorated with two Distinguished Service Crosses, a Silver Star and a Purple Heart for his service in the war.

Between the wars, Ryder served in various posts, including the Command and General Staff School, Fort Leavenworth, Kansas; the 15th Infantry in Tianjin, China; Assistant Instructor of Tactics, Commanding Company of Cadets at West Point (1923-1924) and as Commandant of Cadets at West Point (1937–1941).

== World War II ==
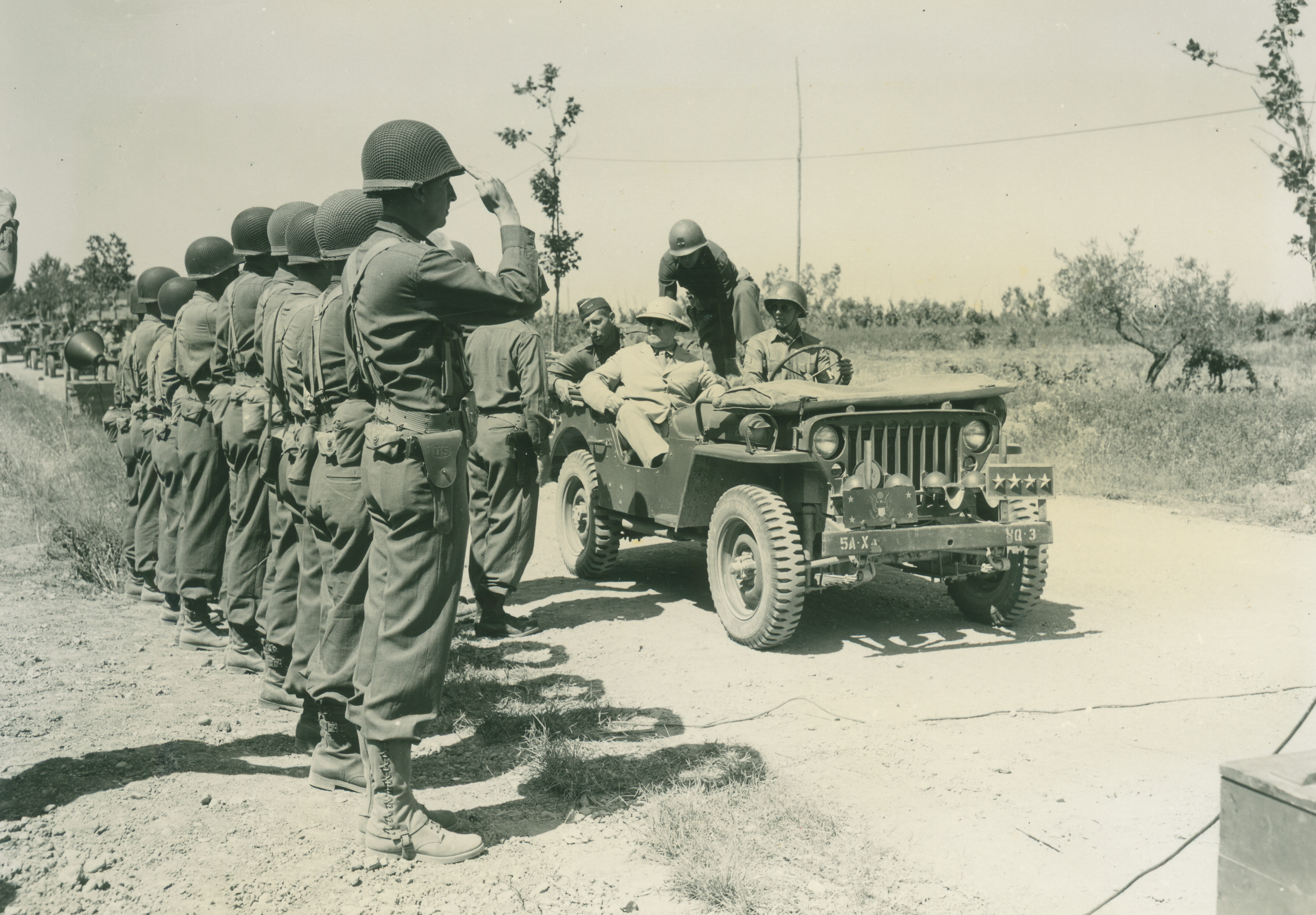
Secretary of War Henry L. Stimson and Lieutenant General Mark W. Clark, commanding the U.S. Fifth Army, and Major General Charles W. Ryder, commander of the 34th Division, passing by elements of Ryder's 34th Division.

In 1941–1942, during World War II, he was chief of staff of the VI Corps. From May 1942 to July 1944, Ryder, promoted to major general, was Commanding General (CG) of the 34th Infantry Division, the first U.S. division deployed to Europe in World War II. He led the division through the Tunisian campaign and the Italian Campaign, including the Operation Torch landings in French North Africa in November 1942 and many battles in Italy.

== Postwar ==
From September 2, 1944, to December 6, 1948, Ryder served as commanding general of the IX Corps, preparing for the invasion of Japan. After the Japanese surrender, he continued to serve as commanding general of the IX Corps during the occupation of Japan.

Ryder retired from the Army in 1950 and died at Martha's Vineyard Hospital on August 17, 1960, at the age of 68.

== Family ==
His son, Charles Wolcott Ryder Jr. was a USMA graduate in the Class of 1941 who served with the 90th Infantry Division, had an equally distinguished career and, like his father, also rose to the rank of major general.

== Awards and decorations ==
Distinguished Service Cross (with oak leaf cluster)
Army Distinguished Service Medal
Silver Star (with oak leaf cluster)
Legion of Merit (with oak leaf cluster)
Purple Heart
World War I Victory Medal (with Silver Citation Star)
American Defense Service Medal
American Campaign Medal
European–African–Middle Eastern Campaign Medal with 4 campaign stars
World War II Victory Medal
Army of Occupation Medal (with Japan Clasp)
Companion of the Order of the Bath

Military offices
Preceded by Russell P. Hartle	Commanding General 34th Infantry Division; 1942–1944	Succeeded by Charles L. Bolte
Preceded by Emil F. Reinhardt	Commanding General IX Corps; 1944–1948	Succeeded by Leland Hobbs
