= Operation Flashpoint (March 1945) =

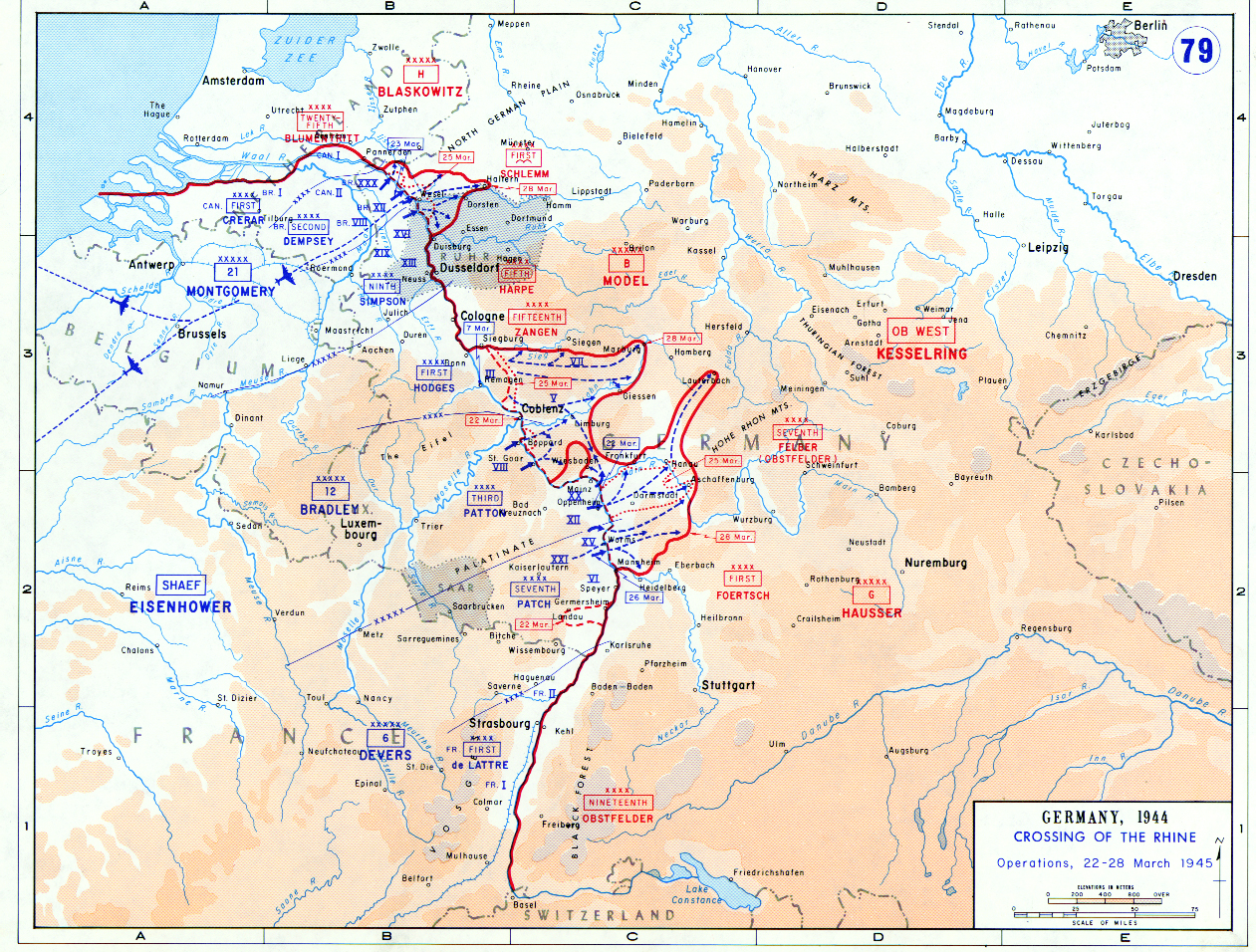
Crossing the Rhine (22-28 March 1945)

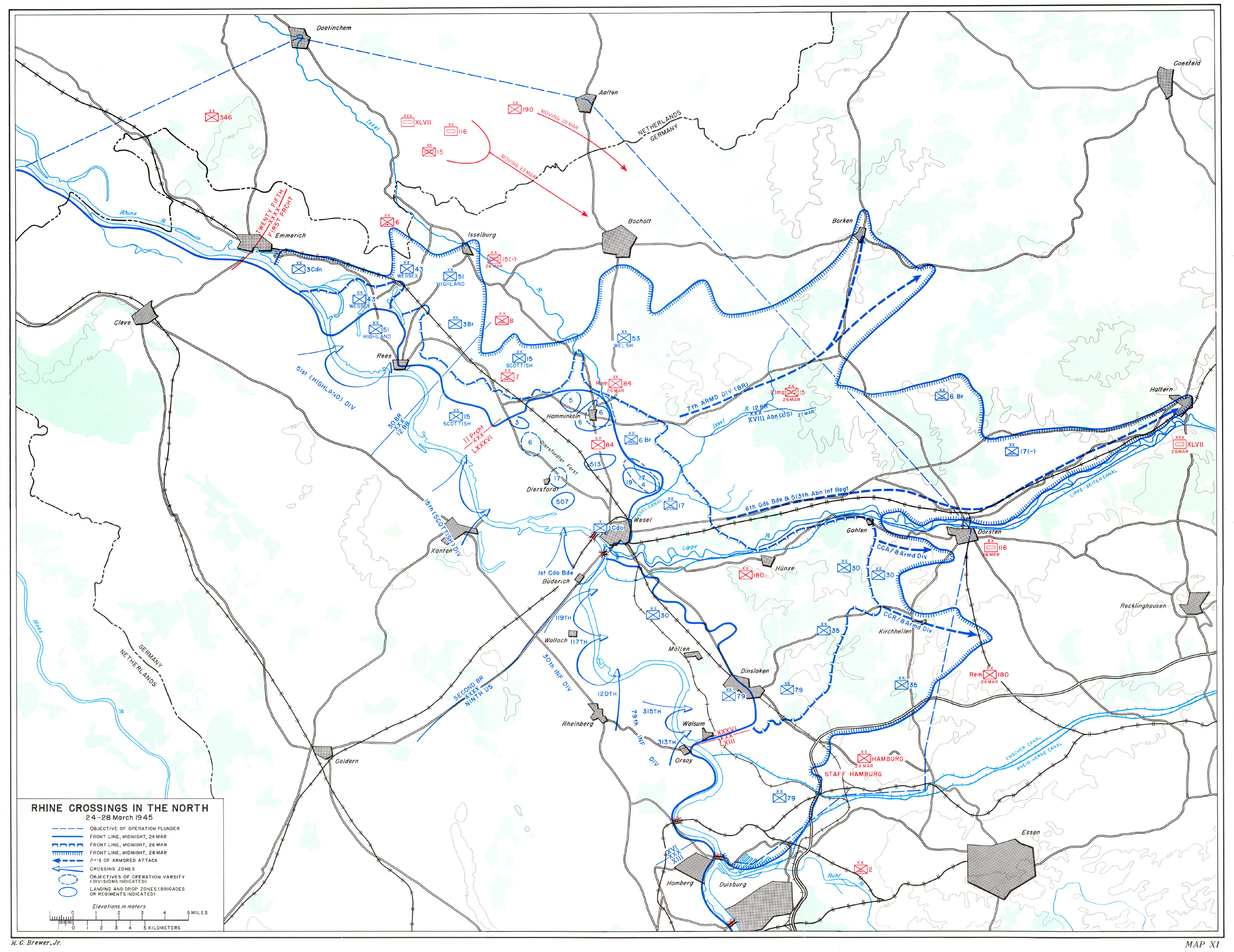
Map of Allied operations in the lower Rhine from March 24–28

Operation Flashpoint was the Ninth United States Army part of Operation Plunder, the crossing of the lower Rhine by the 21st Army Group during March 22–28 March 1945, in the last months of World War II, in which the Ninth Army established bridgeheads in the sector between Wesel and Walsum on the right bank of the Rhine.

== Initial assault ==
Operation Flashpoint, under the command of William H. Simpson, involved an assault by the 30th Infantry Division (between Wesel and Möllen) and the 79th Infantry Division (between Möllen and Walsum), a sector defended by the 1st Parachute Army commanded by Alfred Schlemm. As Schlemm had been wounded in an air attack on his command post at Haltern March 21, command was assumed on 27 March by Günther Blumentritt.

== Bridging the Rhine ==
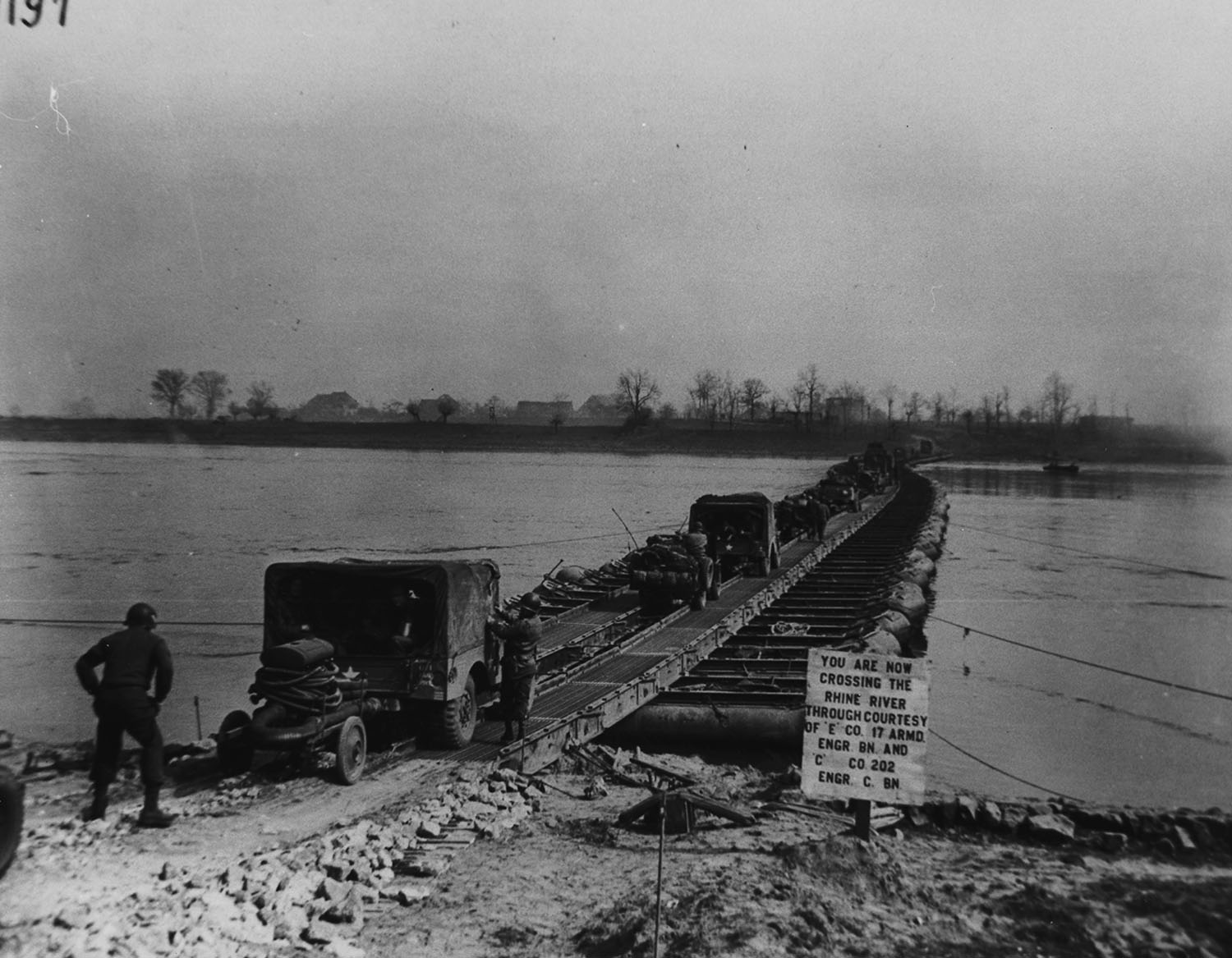
U.S. 9th Army crossing the Rhine River (M2, steel treadway, pontoon bridge, late March, 1945)

The Rhine was bridged by the 17th Armored Engineer Battalion, detached from the 2nd Armored Division. On the night of 23 March, Company E and C constructed two preliminary treadway rafts over the Rhine, south of Wesel and opposite Spellen (now part of the town of Voerde). In the morning, a bridge that could bear mechanized transport started at 9:45 am, and by 4:00 pm the first truck crossed the floating bridge. Over 1152 feet of M2 treadway and 93 pneumatic floats were used in the project, which required just six hours and fifteen minutes to complete, setting a record for the size of the bridge.

== Breakout ==
After the Rhine had been bridged, the 75th Infantry Division crossed on 24 March and the 35th Infantry Division crossed 25–26 March. Once the 8th Armored Division was across, the Ninth Army was able to break out of the bridgehead, push along the northern edge of the Ruhr Pocket, and link up on 1 April near Lippstadt with the First United States Army coming from the south, thus surrounding the German Army Group B under the command of Walter Model.

== Bibliography ==
- Christopher Chant: The encyclopedia of codenames of World War II. ISBN 978-0-7102-0718-0.
- Charles B. MacDonald: The Last Offensive. (United States Army in World War II, European Theater of Operations). Office of the Chief of Military History, Department of the Army. Washington D.C. 1973 (pages 303-309, Index).
- Rawson, Andrew (2006). The Rhine Crossing - Operation Flashpoint & Varsity 9th US Army & 17th US Airborne. Barnsley. ISBN 978-1-84415-232-2.
