= William Hood Simpson =

United States army general (1888–1980)

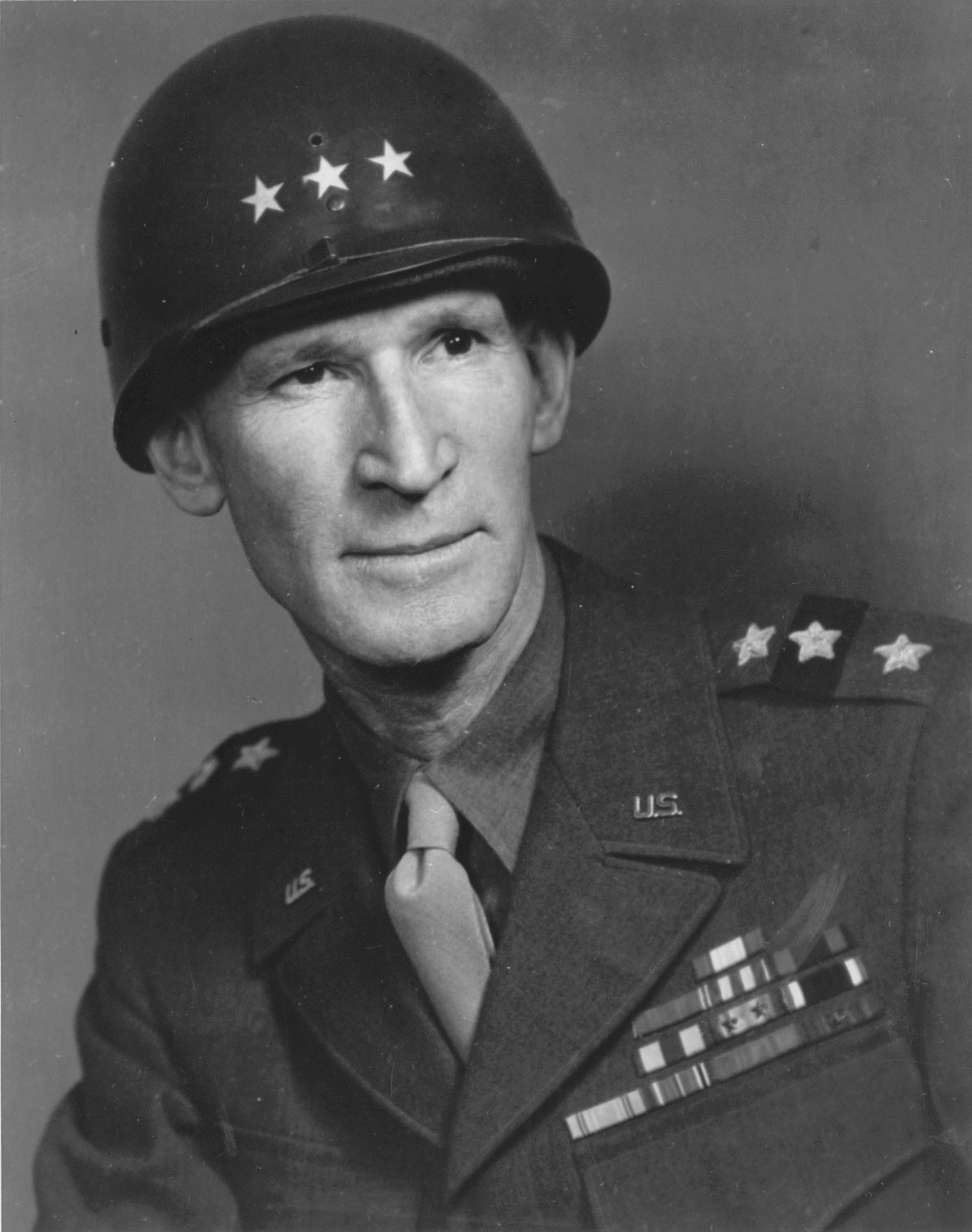
- Lieutenant General Simpson in 1945
- Born: 18 May 1888; Weatherford, Texas, United States
- Died: 15 August 1980 (aged 92); San Antonio, Texas, United States
- Burial place: Arlington National Cemetery, Virginia, United States
- Military career
- Allegiance: United States
- Branch: United States Army
- Service years: 1909–1946
- Rank: General
- Nickname: "Big Simp"
- Service number: O-2645
- Unit: Infantry Branch
- Commands: 3rd Battalion, 12th Infantry Regiment; 9th Infantry Regiment; 35th Infantry Division; 30th Infantry Division; XII Corps; Fourth Army; Ninth Army; Second Army
- Conflicts: Philippine–American War; Moro Rebellion; Border War; World War I; Meuse–Argonne offensive; World War II; Operation Overlord; Battle for Brest; Siegfried Line campaign; Western Allied invasion of Germany; Operation Grenade; Operation Queen; Operation Plunder; Occupation of Germany
- Awards: Army Distinguished Service Medal (2); Silver Star; Bronze Star; Legion of Merit; Legion of Honour (France); Croix de Guerre 1914–1918 (France); Knight Commander of the Order of the British Empire (United Kingdom); Croix de guerre 1939–1945 with palm (France); Order of Kutuzov First Class (USSR); Grand Officer of the Order of Orange-Nassau (Netherlands); Grand Officer of the Order of Leopold with Palm (Belgium); Croix de Guerre 1940–1945 with palm (Belgium)

General William Hood Simpson (18 May 1888 – 15 August 1980) was a senior United States Army officer who served with distinction in both World War I and World War II. He is best known for being the commanding general of the Ninth United States Army in northwest Europe during World War II.

A graduate of the United States Military Academy at West Point, New York, where he was ranked 101st out of 103 in the class of 1909, Simpson served in the Philippines, where he participated in suppression of the Moro Rebellion, and in Mexico with the Pancho Villa Expedition in 1916. During World War I he saw active service in the Meuse-Argonne Offensive on the Western Front on the staff of the 33rd Division, for which he was awarded the Army Distinguished Service Medal and Silver Citation Star. Between the wars he served on staff postings, attended the Command and General Staff College and the Army War College, and commanded the 3rd Battalion, 12th Infantry Regiment.

During World War II he commanded the 9th Infantry Regiment and was the assistant division commander of the 2nd Infantry Division. In succession he commanded the 35th and the 30th Infantry Divisions, the XII Corps, and the Fourth Army. In May 1944, with the three-star rank of lieutenant general, he assumed command of the Ninth Army. Simpson led the Ninth Army in the assault on Brest in September 1944, and the advance to the Roer River in November. During the Battle of the Bulge in December, Simpson's Ninth Army came under command of Field Marshal Bernard Montgomery's Anglo-Canadian 21st Army Group. After the battle was over in early 1945, the Ninth Army remained with Montgomery's 21st Army Group for Operation Grenade, the advance to the Rhine, and Operation Plunder, its crossing. On 1 April the Ninth Army made contact with the First Army, making a complete encirclement of the Ruhr, and on 11 April, it reached the Elbe.

After the war ended, Simpson commanded the Second United States Army, and served in the Office of the Chief of Staff. He retired from the army in 1946. In retirement, he lived and worked in the San Antonio, Texas, area. He was a member of the board of directors of the Alamo National Bank, and succeeded General Walter Krueger as a member of the board of directors of the Chamber of Commerce of San Antonio. He died in the Brooke Army Medical Center on 15 August 1980, and was buried in Arlington National Cemetery.

== Early life and military career ==
William Hood Simpson was born on 18 May 1888, at Weatherford, Texas, the son of Edward J. Simpson, a rancher, and his wife Elizabeth née Hood, the daughter of Judge A. J. Hood, a prominent lawyer. His father and uncle had fought with the Confederate Army under Nathan Bedford Forrest in the American Civil War. He lived in Weatherford until he was five or six years old, when the family moved to Hood's ranch near Aledo, Texas. He did not start school until he was eight years old, when he started riding a horse several miles each day to the local school in Aledo. He attended Hughey Turner Training School, a college-preparatory school, where he played high school football, but did not graduate.

Simpson decided to pursue a military career and attend the United States Military Academy (USMA) at West Point, New York. He was friends with Fritz G. Lanham, the son of Samuel Lanham, the Governor of Texas (and a former law partner of Judge Hood). Through Lanham he was able to secure an appointment from his local Congressman, Oscar W. Gillespie. Competition was not fierce; only one other boy applied. As Simpson's academic credits were insufficient to qualify for automatic admission, Simpson had to sit an entrance examination at Fort Sam Houston in May 1905. A physical examination was conducted while he was there. He passed both, and was accepted into the class of 1909.

On 14 June 1905, a month after he turned 17, Simpson entered West Point. Amongst his cadet friends, he was known as "Greaser" (A slur used to describe Mexicans) because he was from Texas. He found the curriculum difficult, and by the end of his first year, he stood 116th in a class that now numbered 120; 29 members of the class had dropped out. He was poor at mathematics, but excelled at equitation; by the end of his second year he was 107th out of 108, then 100th out of 107 by the end of his third. When eight cadets, two of whom were from the class of 1909, were found guilty of hazing and suspended, it fell to Simpson, as a cadet captain, to escort them from the academy grounds. Simpson graduated on 11 June 1909, ranked 101st out of 103 in his class, and was commissioned as a second lieutenant of Infantry. Fellow members of his class included Jacob L. Devers (39th), George S. Patton (46th), and Robert L. Eichelberger (68th), all of whom eventually reached four-star rank, and John C. H. Lee (12th), and Delos C. Emmons (61st), who reached three-star rank.

== Early military career and World War I ==
Simpson's first assignment was with the 2nd Battalion, 6th Infantry Regiment, which was stationed at Fort Lincoln, North Dakota. He acquired the nickname "Big Simp" because there was another officer in the regiment with the same surname. Because Simpson was over 6 feet (180 cm) tall, he became "Big Simp" and the other officer became "Little Simp". Soon after he joined in the regiment on 11 September 1909, it received orders to deploy to the Philippines. He embarked from San Francisco on 5 January 1910. He went to the island of Mindanao in the Philippines and participated in suppression of the Moro Rebellion. He returned to the United States with his regiment, arriving at the Presidio of San Francisco on 10 July 1912. The regiment moved to El Paso, Texas, between 24 April and 1 May 1914. Promoted to first lieutenant on 1 July 1916, he commanded Companies C and K in the Pancho Villa Expedition in 1916. On 24 February 1917, he became aide-de-camp to Brigadier General George Bell Jr., the commander of the El Paso Military District.

Simpson was promoted to captain on 15 May 1917, a month after the American entry into World War I. He followed Bell on a tour of inspection of the British and French forces on the Western Front in September and October 1917. They then returned to Camp Logan, Texas, where the 33rd Division was activated, with Bell, now a major general, as its first commander. The 33rd Division arrived in France in May 1918 and Simpson became its Assistant Chief of Staff (G-3), the staff member responsible for operations. He was promoted to major on 7 June 1918, and attended the American Expeditionary Forces (AEF) Army General Staff College from 15 June to 30 August. He returned to the 33rd Division as assistant to its G-2 (the staff member responsible for intelligence) on 1 September, then became assistant to its G-3 on 15 September. He became G-3 again on 4 October, and participated in the Meuse–Argonne offensive. He was promoted to lieutenant colonel on 5 November, and became the division's chief of staff on 17 November, soon after World War I ended on 11 November 1918. For his services during the war he was awarded the Army Distinguished Service Medal and Silver Citation Star, and the French Croix de guerre and Legion of Honour in the grade of Chevalier. The citation for his Army DSM read:

The President of the United States of America, authorized by Act of Congress, 9 July 1918, takes pleasure in presenting the Army Distinguished Service Medal to Lieutenant Colonel (Infantry) William Hood Simpson, United States Army, for exceptionally meritorious and distinguished services to the Government of the United States, in a duty of great responsibility during World War I, as Assistant Chief of Staff, 33d Division, during the Meuse-Argonne offensive and later as Chief of Staff of this division.

== Between the wars ==
Upon returning to the United States in May 1919, Simpson was posted to the 6th Division at Camp Grant, Illinois, as its chief of staff from 15 June 1919, to 25 August 1920. He reverted to his substantive rank of captain on 30 June 1920, but was promoted to major again the following day. From 26 August to 30 December, he served as its assistant chief of staff (G-3). He served in Washington, D.C., in the Office of the Chief of Infantry from 1 January 1921, to 1 August 1923. In El Paso, Texas, on Christmas Eve, 1921, he married Ruth Krakauer, an English-born widow whom he had first met while at West Point. From 1 September 1923, to 28 May 1924, he was a student officer in the Advanced Course at the Infantry School at Fort Benning, Georgia. He then attended the United States Army Command and General Staff College at Fort Leavenworth, Kansas, from 15 August 1924, to 19 June 1925, when completed the program of instruction as a distinguished graduate.

On 1 July 1925, Simpson assumed command of the 3rd Battalion, 12th Infantry Regiment, at Camp Meade, Maryland, and later Fort Washington, Maryland; his tour in command also included duty at the Sesquicentennial Exposition in Philadelphia from May to November 1926. He then attended the United States Army War College from 15 August 1927, to 30 June 1928. Upon graduation, he was assigned to the War Department General Staff in Washington, D.C., where he worked in the Latin American section of the G-2 branch. On 20 June 1932, he became Professor of Military Science and Tactics at Pomona College in Claremont, California, and was promoted to lieutenant colonel again from 1 October 1934. This posting also included duty as the Army representative at the California Pacific International Exposition in 1935. He then became an instructor at the Army War College in the G-4 Division from 12 August 1936, to 24 June 1937, and was director of its G-2 Division until 25 August 1940, with the rank of colonel from 1 September 1938.

== World War II ==
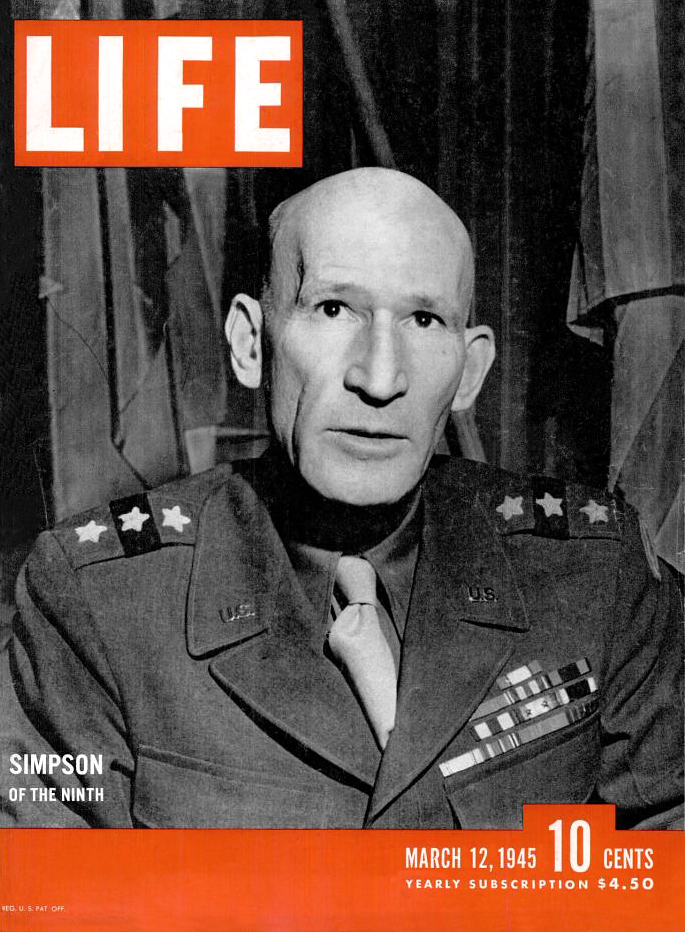
Simpson on the cover of LIFE magazine, 12 March 1945

=== Early war ===
On 30 August 1940, Simpson was appointed to command the 9th Infantry Regiment at Fort Sam Houston, Texas. He was promoted to brigadier general on 1 October 1940, and served as the Assistant Division Commander (ADC) of the 2nd Infantry Division from 5 October 1940 to 4 April 1941, when Fred L. Walker succeeded him. From April to September 1941 he was the first commander of the country's largest Infantry Replacement Training Center, Camp Wolters, located in Mineral Wells, Texas. He received a promotion to temporary major general on 29 September 1941, and commanded the 35th Infantry Division, a National Guard formation, at Camp Robinson, Arkansas, from 15 October 1941 to 5 April 1942, for which he was awarded the Legion of Merit. He then commanded the 30th Infantry Division, another National Guard formation, at Fort Jackson, South Carolina, until Leland Hobbs took command. On 31 August 1942, he took command of the newly created XII Corps.

Simpson then commanded the Fourth United States Army from 29 September 1943 to 8 May 1944, with the three-star rank of lieutenant general as of 13 October 1943. In September 1943, the Fourth Army was reformed as an independent organization when its combined headquarters with the Western Defense Command was separated. A cadre for the Army headquarters was provided by the Western Defense Command, but all senior officers were approved or selected by Simpson. He brought his chief of staff, Colonel James E. Moore, with him from XII Corps. Moore had previously served with him as chief of staff of the 35th and 30th Infantry Divisions. The Fourth Army headquarters was initially in San Jose, California, and it functioned as a training army. In search of more office space, the headquarters was moved to the Presidio of Monterey, California, on 1 November, and then to Fort Sam Houston in January 1944, when it took over the training mission of the Third United States Army, which had moved overseas.

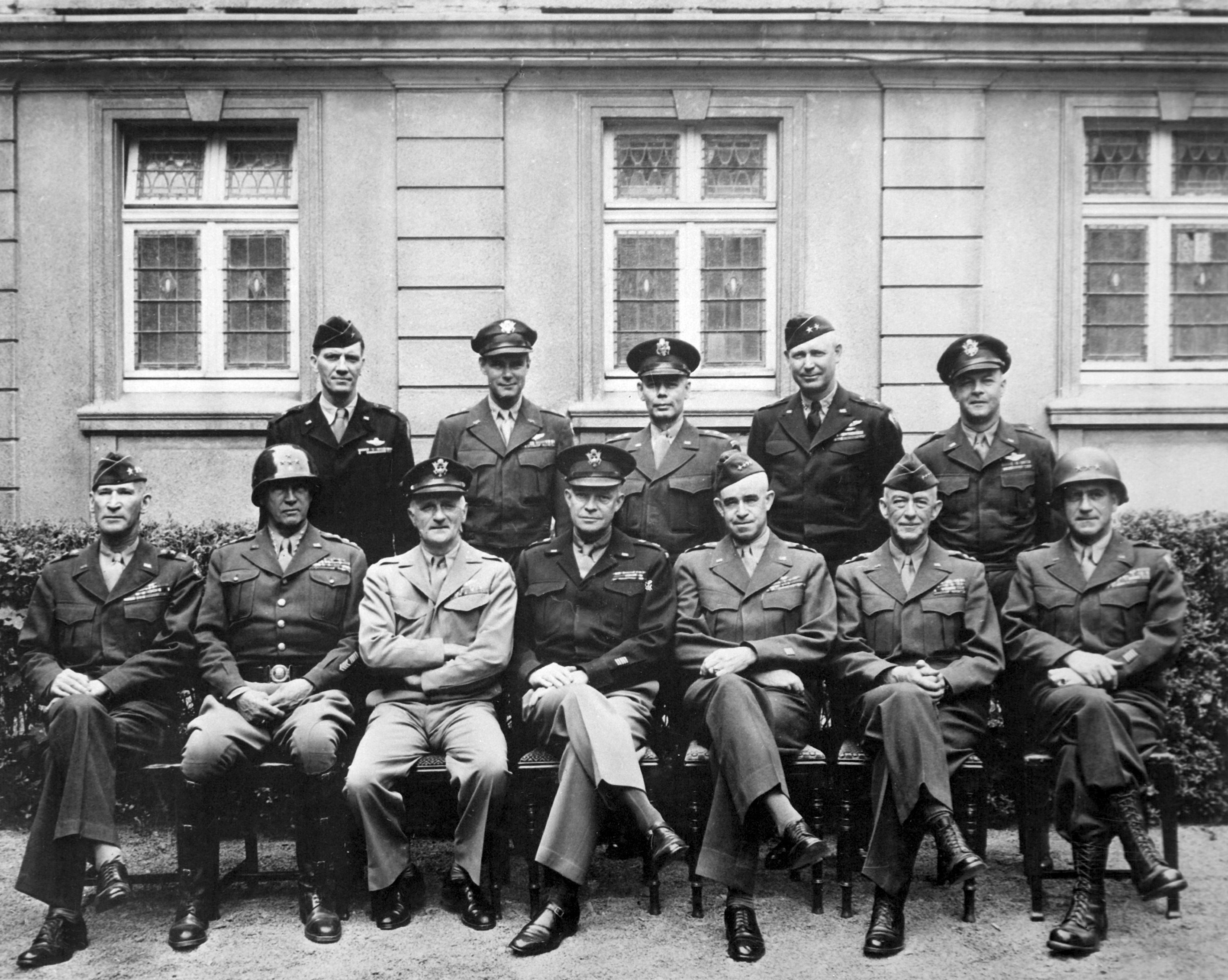
Senior American commanders of the European theater of World War II. Seated, from left to right, are William H. Simpson, George S. Patton, Carl A. Spaatz, Dwight D. Eisenhower, Omar Bradley, Courtney Hodges, and Leonard T. Gerow; standing are (from left to right) Ralph F. Stearley, Hoyt Vandenberg, Walter Bedell Smith, Otto P. Weyland, and Richard E. Nugent

=== Command of the Ninth United States Army ===
More personnel arrived in early 1944, enabling the Fourth Army to be split into a training army (the Fourth) and a headquarters to be deployed overseas, the Eighth, which was activated on 5 May 1944. Simpson and most of his staff became part of the Eighth Army headquarters. An advance party of the headquarters flew to the UK on 11 May, and Simpson met with the commander of the European Theater of Operations, United States Army, General Dwight D. Eisenhower, an Army War College classmate. At Eisenhower's request, Simpson's command was redesignated the Ninth United States Army to avoid confusion with the British Eighth Army. The main body of Ninth Army embarked for the UK on the ocean liner RMS Queen Elizabeth on 22 June. Simpson observed the abortive start of Operation Cobra on 24 July with Lieutenant Generals Courtney Hodges and Lewis H. Brereton. They were forced to take shelter as errant American bombs dropped around them. Lieutenant General Lesley J. McNair invited Simpson to watch the repeat of the bombardment with him the following day, but Simpson elected to return to his headquarters in England. Once again bombs fell short, and McNair was killed.

The Ninth Army headquarters moved to France, as it landed at Utah Beach on 29 and 30 August. It became active as part of Lieutenant General Omar Bradley's 12th Army Group on 5 September, when the Ninth Army took over command of the US forces in Brittany from Lieutenant General George S. Patton Jr.'s Third Army. Simpson's first task was the capture of Brest. To overcome strong natural and man-made defenses, Simpson chose to employ overwhelming firepower. There were sufficient artillery pieces in the area, but not sufficient ammunition, especially for the heavier pieces. Over a two-week period, 40,000 long tons (41,000 t) of artillery ammunition was brought forward from dumps in Normandy and the UK. The battle commenced on 8 September, and after much hard fighting the city was liberated on 20 September 1944.

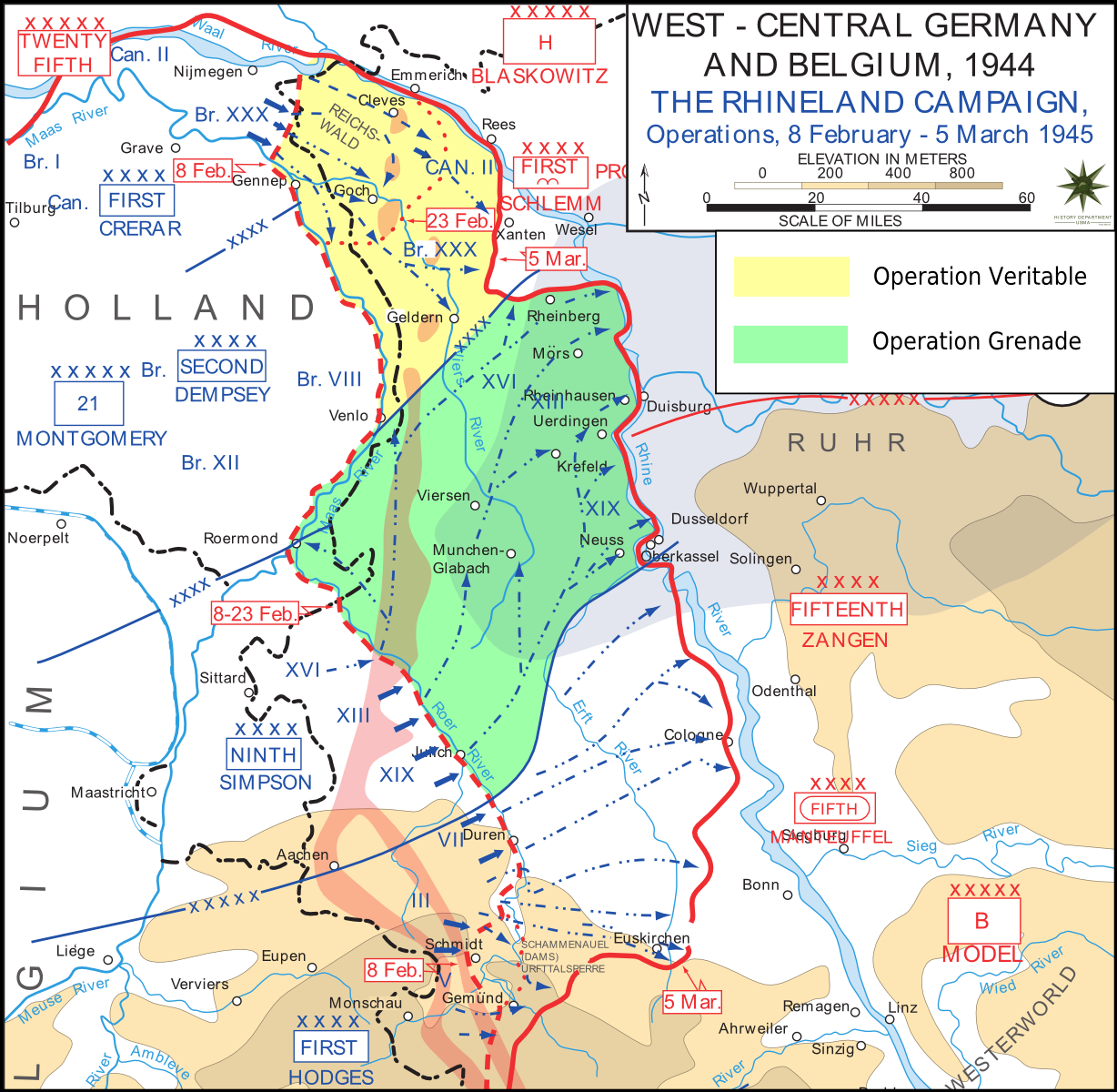
Rhineland Campaign, 8 February – 5 March 1945

Simpson moved his headquarters to Arlon, where it opened on 2 October, and two days later the Ninth Army relieved First Army in the southern portion of its line, taking over the center of the 12th Army Group's front in the Ardennes between the First and Third Armies. The stay at Arlon was brief; on 10 October, Simpson received word that Ninth Army was to take over the northern sector of the 12th Army Group's front adjoining Field Marshal Bernard Montgomery's Anglo-Canadian 21st Army Group. This was a consequence of Eisenhower's decision to reinforce that sector. The plan was for the Ninth Army to envelop the Ruhr industrial area to the north while First Army enveloped it to the south.

Reflecting on the decision later, Bradley opined that the "uncommonly normal" Ninth Army staff collaborated with the 21st Army Group better than the more temperamental First Army staff did. Ninth Army's attack on the Siegfried Line north of Aachen commenced on 16 November, heralded by artillery and aerial bombardment that included attacks by heavy bombers of the Eighth Air Force and RAF Bomber Command. Progress was slow and costly. Simpson's offensive ended on 14 December, but on the Roer River rather than the Rhine, due to the flooding threat posed by Roer dams upstream.

The Urft Dam (Urfttalsperre) held 161,000,000 cubic feet (4,550,000 m^{3}) of water, and the Rur Dam (Schwammenauel) held another 2.31×10^{9} cubic feet (65,500,000 m^{3}). The Germans could demolish them to create a disastrous flood. Alternatively, through controlled demolition, they could release 7,100 cubic feet per second (202 m^{3}/s). This would put the river into a flood condition that would cause it to rise by 3 feet (0.91 m), increase the speed of the current by 10 feet per second (3.0 m/s) and increase the width to 1,200 feet (370 m). This would preclude a crossing attempt for ten to twelve days.

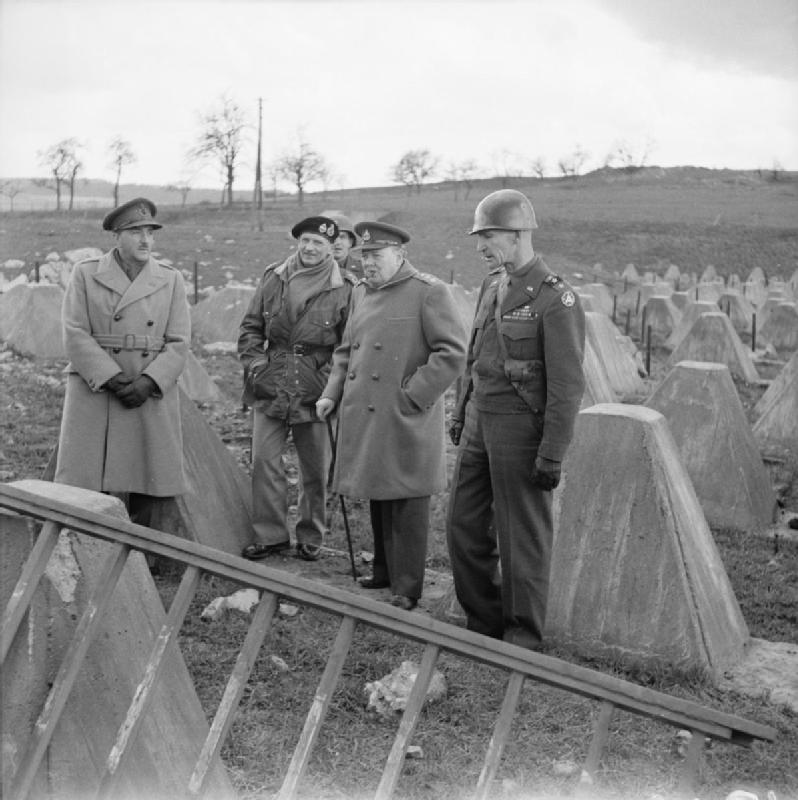
Simpson (right) with Field Marshal Sir Alan Brooke, Field Marshal Sir Bernard Montgomery and Winston Churchill among dragons teeth obstacles of the Siegfried Line near Aachen on 4 March 1945

Eisenhower was anxious about accepting an army commander without operational experience in the war, but senior officers with such experience were few in May 1944. By 1 October, however, Eisenhower was sufficiently impressed by Simpson's performance to write to the Chief of Staff of the Army, General George C. Marshall, and recommend that Simpson's temporary rank of lieutenant general be made substantive. According to Colonel Armistead D. Mead, Simpson's G-3 (Operations) officer:

General Simpson's genius lay in his charismatic manner, his command presence, his ability to listen, his unfailing use of his staff to check things out before making decisions, and his way of making all hands feel that they were important to him and to the army... I have never known a commander to make better use of his staff than General Simpson.

During the crisis of the Battle of the Bulge, the Ninth Army came under Montgomery's command on 20 December. The Ninth Army took no part in the battle, but was stripped of eight divisions to reinforce the First Army, and took over part of its front. After the battle was over in early 1945, the Ninth Army remained with Montgomery's 21st Army Group for the final attack into Germany. For Operation Grenade, the crossing of the Roer, the Ninth Army was reinforced, its strength increased from five to twelve divisions. The major obstacle to the advance was the river itself, as the dams were still in German hands.

The British Second Army commenced Operation Veritable, the northern part of a pincer movement to clear the Rhineland, on 8 February 1945. Montgomery's plan was for Operation Grenade, scheduled to commence on 10 February 1945, to form the southern part of the pincer, but there was still no word of the capture of the Roer dams by the First Army. Montgomery left the decision of whether to delay Operation Grenade up to Simpson, but postponement would make the task of both the British troops already fighting more difficult, and increase the risk that the Germans would detect the Ninth Army's preparations. Simpson watched the river slowly rise, but could not be certain whether it was the result of German demolition or increased flow due to snow melt. Finally, he postponed the attack. His decision was the correct one; the waters continued to rise and the river level was up 5 feet (1.5 m) on 9 and 10 February.

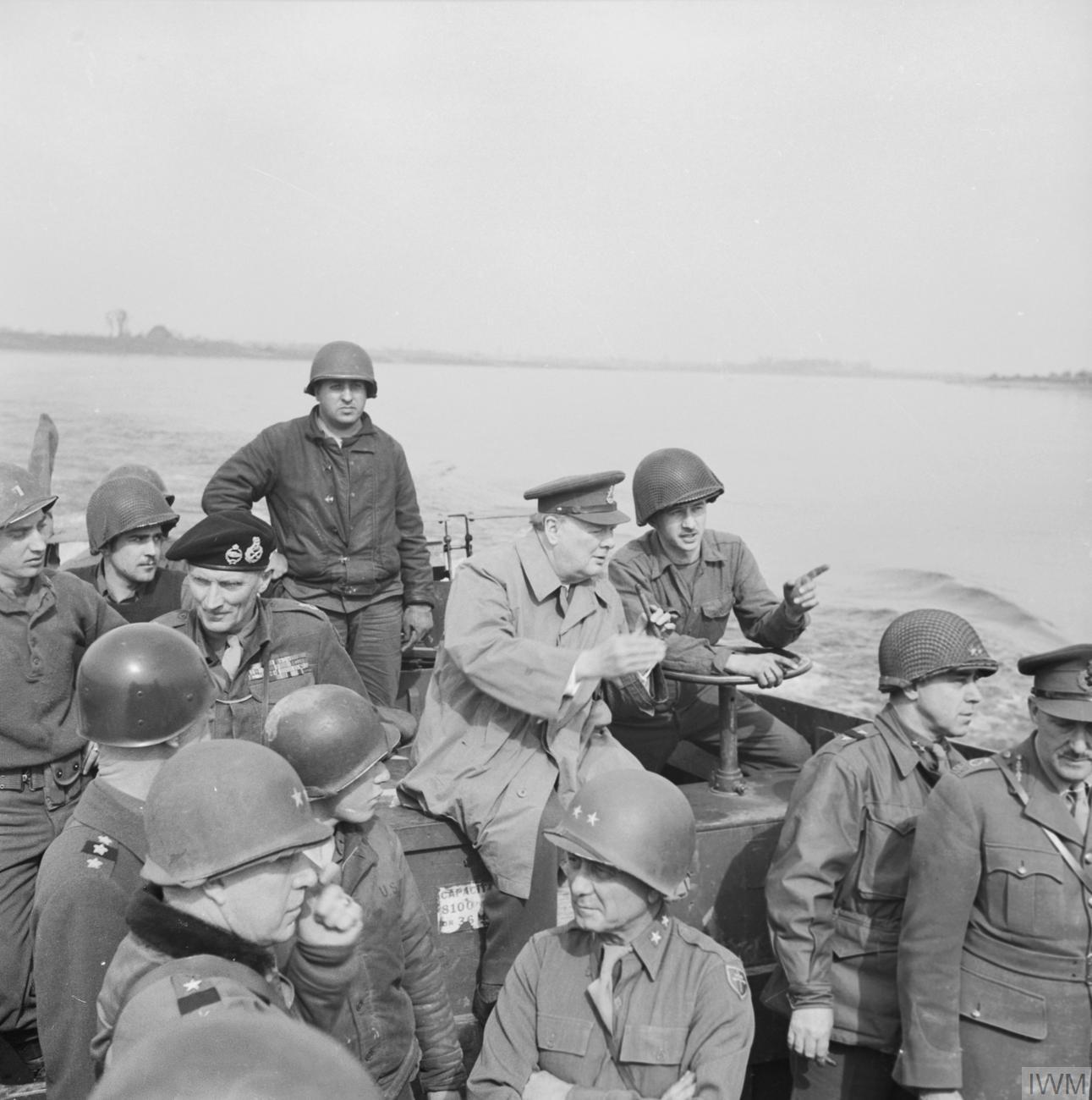
Simpson (left) crosses the Rhine in an LCVP with Field Marshal Sir Bernard Montgomery, Winston Churchill and Field Marshal Sir Alan Brooke

Operation Grenade was finally launched on 23 February, even though the water level had not yet completely returned to normal. The attack was successfully concluded on 5 March, with the Rhine reached. Next came Operation Plunder, the 21st Army Group's crossing of the Rhine; the Ninth Army's part was called Operation Flashpoint. The Rhine was crossed on 24 March 1945. On 1 April, the Ninth Army made contact with First Army, making a complete encirclement of the Ruhr. Three days later, the Ninth Army reverted to the control of Bradley's 12th Army Group. On 11 April, the Ninth Army reached the Elbe.

On 10 March, Montgomery had written to Simpson:

I would like to tell you how very pleased I have been with everything the Ninth Army has done. The operations were planned and carried through with great skill and energy. It has fallen to my lot to be mixed up with a good deal of fighting since I took command of the Eighth Army before Alamein in 1942; and the experience I have gained enables me to judge pretty well the military calibre of Armies. I can truthfully say that the operations of the Ninth Army, since 23 February last, have been up to the best standards.

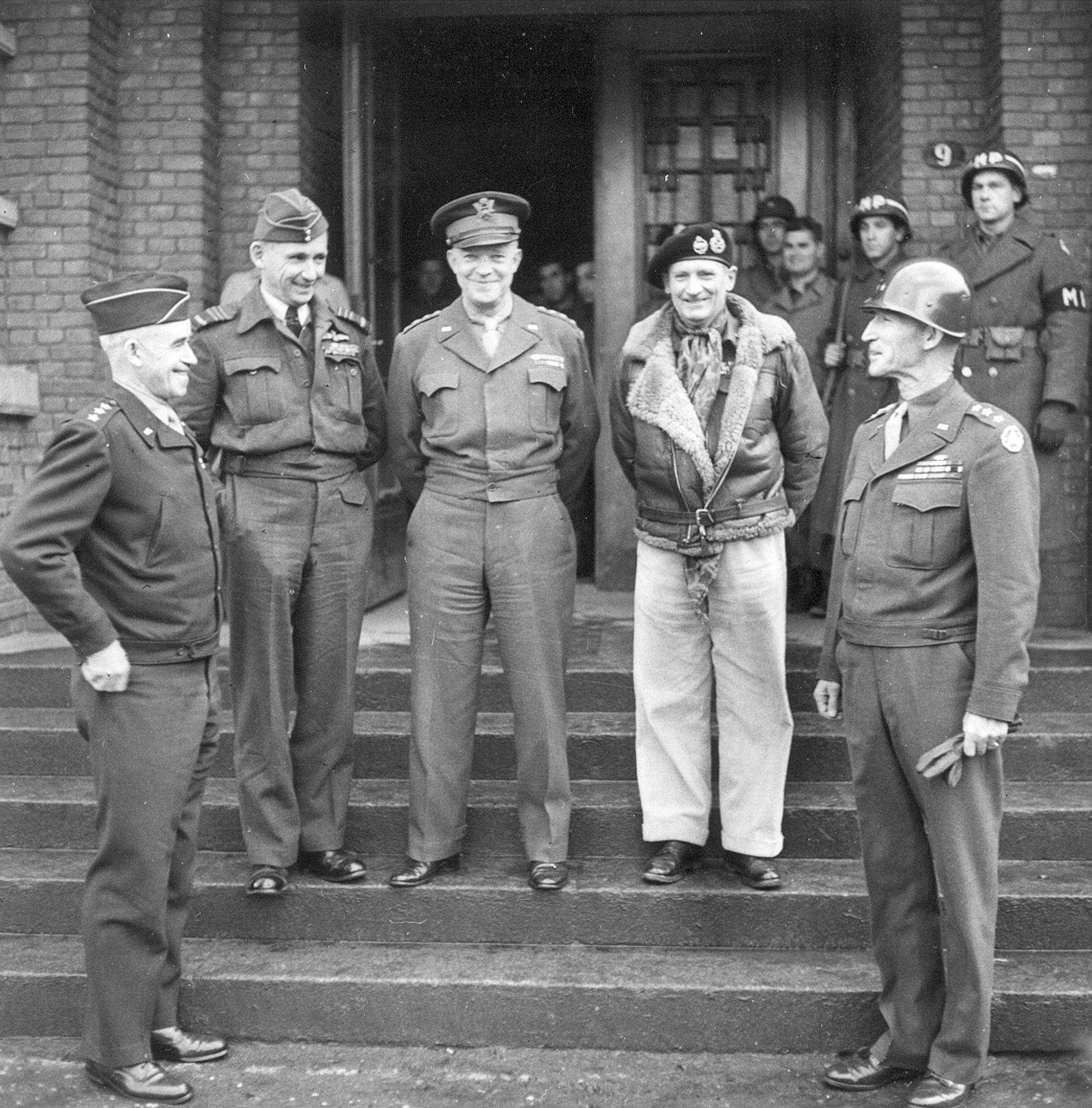
Senior Allied commanders. Left to right: Lieutenant General Omar Bradley, Air Chief Marshal Sir Arthur Tedder, General Dwight Eisenhower and Field Marshal Sir Bernard Montgomery and Simpson

After Victory in Europe Day, the Ninth Army participated in the occupation of Germany. On 6 May, it took over the First Army's units, allowing the First Army headquarters to redeploy to the Pacific. Further regrouping followed, as most of the area covered was earmarked to be administered by the UK or Soviet Union. On 15 June, all units of the Ninth Army were handed over to the Seventh United States Army, and Ninth Army headquarters prepared to redeploy to China. Simpson flew to China, where he met with Lieutenant General Albert C. Wedemeyer, the American commander there. Simpson was informed that he would become the Commanding General, Field Forces, and deputy theater commander. The end of the war in Asia came before this occurred. In August 1945 the headquarters of the Ninth Army was redeployed to Camp Shanks, New York. In mid-September it was moved to Fort Bragg and inactivated on 10 October 1945.

Eisenhower summarized his experience with Simpson as follows:

If Simpson ever made a mistake as an Army Commander, it never came to my attention. After the war I learned that he had for some years suffered from a serious stomach disorder, but I would never have suspected during hostilities. Alert, intelligent, and professionally capable, he was the type of leader that American soldiers deserve. In view of his brilliant service, it was unfortunate that shortly after the war ill-health forced his retirement before he was promoted to four-star grade, which he had so clearly earned.

For his services as commander of the Ninth Army, Simpson was awarded the Bronze Star Medal and a second Army Distinguished Service Medal. He also garnered foreign decorations that included being made a Knight Commander of the Order of the British Empire by the UK, a Grand Commander of the Order of Orange-Nassau by the Netherlands, and a Grand Officer of the Order of Leopold with palm by Belgium. He also received the Legion of Honor and the Croix de Guerre 1939–1945 from France, the Soviet Union's Order of Kutuzov, and the Croix de Guerre 1940 with palm from Belgium.

== Later life ==
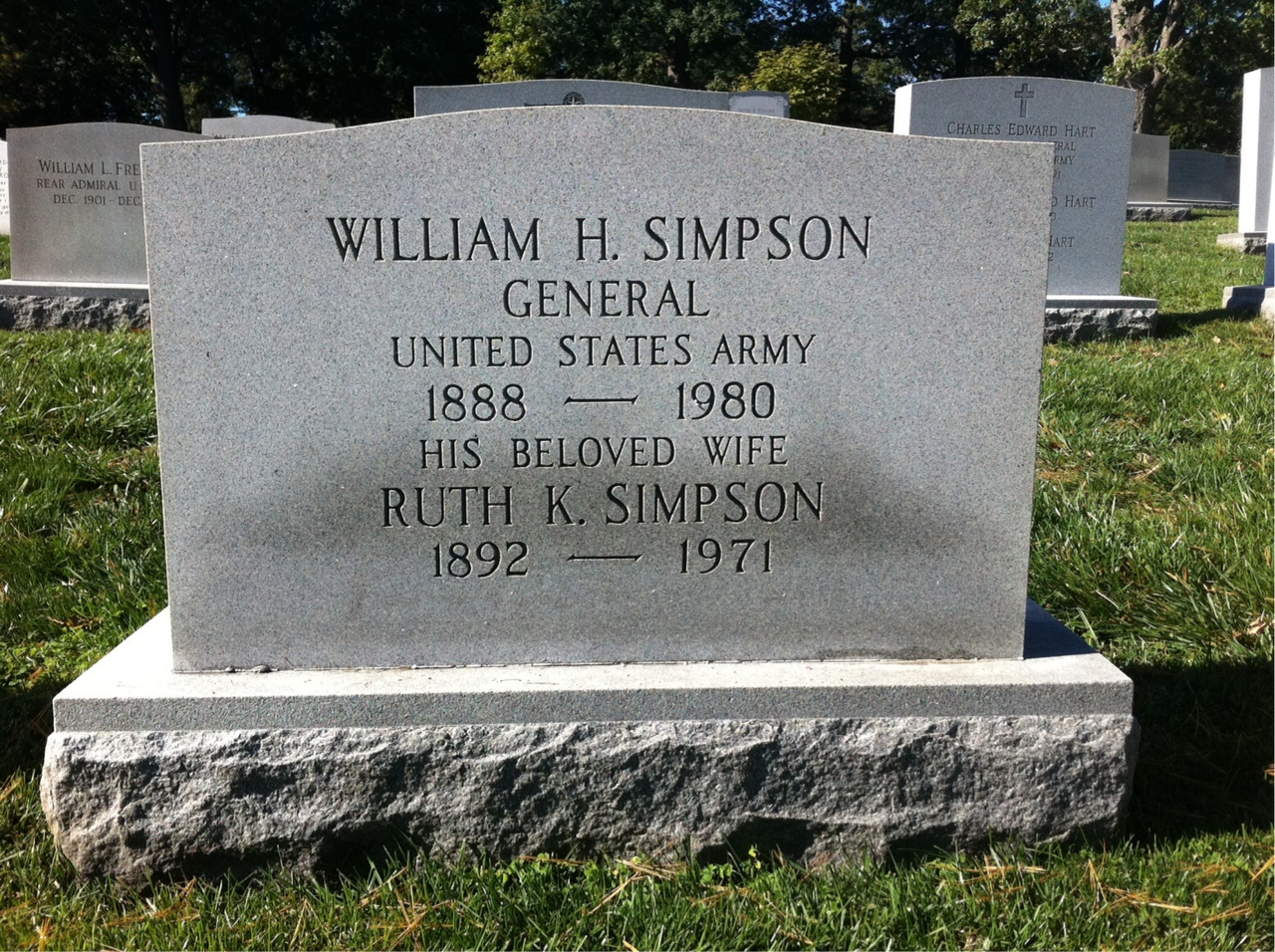
Headstone in Arlington National Cemetery

After the war ended, Simpson commanded the Memphis, Tennessee-based Second United States Army from 11 October to 14 November 1945. He then returned to Washington, D.C., working in the Office of the Chief of Staff as a member of the Military Intelligence Board, and President of the War Department Reorganization Board from 15 November 1945, until 4 April 1946. He retired from the army with a physical disability on 30 November 1946. On 4 August 1954, he was promoted to full general on the retired list by a special Act of Congress that advanced officers who had commanded armies or the equivalent to that rank.

After retirement, Simpson lived and worked in the San Antonio, Texas, area. He was a member of the board of directors of the Alamo National Bank, and succeeded General Walter Krueger as a member of the Board of Directors of the Chamber of Commerce of San Antonio. He was also chairman of the board of the Alamo chapter of the Association of the United States Army, and spearheaded a drive to raise $750,000 for the construction of the Santa Rosa Children's Hospital.

His wife Ruth died in 1971, and soon thereafter, Simpson moved into the Menger Hotel in downtown San Antonio, where he was very popular with the staff. He suffered from phlebitis and neuritis, and was generally confined to his room. In 1978, at the age of 90, he met Catherine Louise (Kay) Berman, a retired civil-service worker from a military family 33 years his junior, and the two were married on 9 April 1978. They moved out of the Menger Hotel and into a home they built in Windcrest, Texas.

Simpson died in the Brooke Army Medical Center on 15 August 1980, and was buried alongside his first wife Ruth in Arlington National Cemetery in Virginia.

== Military decorations ==
Distinguished Service Medal with one oak leaf cluster

Silver Star

Legion of Merit

Bronze Star Medal

Philippine Campaign Medal

Mexican Service Medal

World War I Victory Medal with two battle clasps

Army of Occupation of Germany Medal

American Defense Service Medal

American Campaign Medal

Asiatic-Pacific Campaign Medal

European-African-Middle Eastern Campaign Medal with four bronze service stars

World War II Victory Medal

Order of Kutuzov First Class (Union of Soviet Socialist Republics)

Knight Commander of the Order of the British Empire (United Kingdom)

Légion d'honneur (Knight) (France)

Croix de guerre 1914–1918 (France)

== Dates of rank ==
Insignia	Rank	Component	Date	Reference
No insignia in 1909	Second lieutenant	6th Infantry Regiment	11 June 1909	
	First lieutenant	6th Infantry Regiment	1 July 1916	
	Captain	Infantry	15 May 1917	
	Major	National Army	7 June 1918	
	Lieutenant colonel	National Army	5 November 1918	
	Captain (reverted)	Infantry	30 June 1920	
	Major	Infantry	1 July 1920	
	Lieutenant colonel	Infantry	1 October 1934	
	Colonel	Infantry	1 September 1938	
	Brigadier general	Army of the United States	1 October 1940	
	Major general	Army of the United States	29 September 1941	
	Lieutenant general	Army of the United States	13 October 1943	
	Brigadier general	Regular Army	1 February 1944	
	Major general	Regular Army	11 April 1946	
	Lieutenant general	Retired List	30 November 1946	
	General	Retired List	4 August 1954	

== Notes ==
Military offices
Preceded by Ralph E. Truman	Commanding General 35th Infantry Division; 1941–1942	Succeeded by Maxwell Murray
Preceded by Henry D. Russell	Commanding General 30th Infantry Division; May–July 1942	Succeeded by Leland Hobbs
Preceded by Newly activated post	Commanding General XII Corps; 1942–1943	Succeeded by Gilbert R. Cook
Preceded by John L. DeWitt	Commanding General Fourth United States Army; 1943–1944	Succeeded by John P. Lucas
Preceded by Newly activated post	Commanding General Ninth United States Army; 1944–1945	Succeeded by Post deactivated
Preceded by Lloyd Fredendall	Commanding General Second Army; 1945–1946	Succeeded by Albert Coady Wedemeyer
Awards and achievements
Preceded by Heinrich Himmler	Cover of Time Magazine; 19 February 1945	Succeeded by Chester Nimitz
