= Second Army (United Kingdom) =

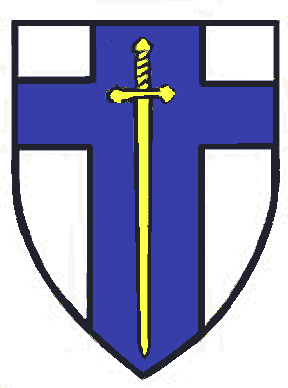
- 2nd Army formation badge WWI (left) and WWII (right)
- Active: First World War; 1914–1918; Second World War; 1942–45
- Country: United Kingdom
- Allegiance: United Kingdom, British Army
- Branch: British Army
- Type: Field Army
- Size: Field Army
- Engagements: First World War; Second World War

Commanders
- Notable commanders: Horace Smith-Dorrien; Herbert Plumer; Miles Dempsey

The British Second Army was a Field Army active during the First and Second World Wars. During the First World War the army was active on the Western Front throughout most of the war and later active in Italy. During the Second World War the army was the main British contribution to the Normandy landings on 6 June 1944 and advance across Europe.

== First World War ==
The Second Army was part of the British Army formed on 26 December 1914, when the British Expeditionary Force was split in two due to becoming too big to control its subordinate formations. The army controlled both III Corps and IV Corps. Second Army spent most of the war positioned around the Ypres salient, but was redeployed to Italy as part of the Italian Expeditionary Force between November 1917 and March 1918.

In 1919 it was reconstituted as the British Army of the Rhine.

=== Commanders ===
- 1914–1915 General Sir Horace Smith-Dorrien
- 1915–1917 General Sir Herbert Plumer
- 1917–1918 General Sir Henry Rawlinson
- 1918 General Sir Herbert Plumer

== Second World War ==
=== France, 1944 ===
The formation was commanded by Lieutenant-General Miles Dempsey and served under the 21st Army Group. Two of its formations, I Corps (also containing Canadian units) and XXX Corps took part in Operation Neptune, the 6 June D-Day landings that commenced Operation Overlord, with its remaining units coming ashore during the remainder of Overlord's Normandy campaign. The third corps to land, VIII Corps, entered the line during late June to add its weight to the assault; in particular for the launching of Operation Epsom. The main British objective during the early stages of the campaign was to capture the French city of Caen, the so-called Battle for Caen. However, due to various factors the city was not captured until mid-July during Operation Atlantic, conducted by Canadian troops under the command of Second Army.

By the end of July, American forces had broken out of Normandy. As they swept east, the German Seventh Army was pinned by the Second Army and trapped in pockets around Falaise. The German formation was subsequently annihilated during the battle of the Falaise pocket. The Second Army then commenced a dash across France in parallel with the Americans on its right, and the Canadians on its left. During the interim, I Corps was transferred from Second Army's control, and assigned to the First Canadian Army. Due to the heavy casualties sustained by the army during the Normandy campaign, the 59th (Staffordshire) Infantry Division was disbanded in August 1944 to make up for the infantry deficit.

=== Belgium and the Netherlands ===
Second Army entered Belgium quickly, and cleared much of the country. Its captures included the capital Brussels and the port city of Antwerp.

Second Army's highest profile operation in 1944, apart from Operation Overlord, was providing the main force for Operation Market Garden. During the operation, American (82nd and 101st), British (1st) and Polish (1st Polish Parachute Brigade) airborne troops, outside the control of Second Army, were landed to capture vital bridges over several rivers in the east of the Netherlands, in order to allow Second Army's XXX Corps to cross the Rhine and advance into Germany, relieving the parachute troops en route. However, the single road XXX Corps had to traverse caused enormous logistical difficulties and, combined with German counterattacks, the operation failed resulting in the loss of much of the 1st Airborne Division during the Battle of Arnhem.

Second Army spent the rest of 1944 exploiting the salient in the German line that it had created during Operation Market Garden, to advance on the Rhine and Meuse rivers in the Netherlands. The final part of this advance took place in mid-January 1945, with the clearing of the Roermond Triangle (codename Operation Blackcock) by XII and VIII Corps. This enabled the completion of the advance on the River Roer.

During February, 1945, Second Army entered a holding phase. Whilst it pinned down the German forces facing it, the Canadian First Army and US Ninth Army made a pincer movement from north and south (Operations Veritable and Grenade) which pierced the Siegfried Line in that area and cleared the remaining German forces west of the Rhine in conjunction with further American offensives in the south of the Rhineland.

=== Germany, 1945 ===
Second Army crossed the Rhine on 23 March in an attack codenamed Operation Plunder. It then headed across the North German Plain towards Osnabrück, with the First Canadian Army on its left wheeling to clear the north of the Netherlands and the area of Lower Saxony west of Oldenburg. The US Ninth Army on its right turned south-east towards Lippstadt to trap the German Army Group B, under General Walter Model, in an enormous pocket in the Ruhr. With Army Group B trapped, the last major German formation in the west had been neutralized.

Second Army reached the Weser on 4 April, the Elbe on 19 April, the shore of the Baltic Sea at Lübeck on 2 May. On 3 May, Hamburg capitulated. By 7 May the Soviet Army had met up with the British forces. Shortly thereafter, the Second World War in Europe came to an end with the surrender of the government of Karl Dönitz, who had succeeded Adolf Hitler after his suicide.

=== Commanders ===
- July 1943 – January 1944 Lieutenant-General Kenneth Anderson
- January 1944 – August 1945 Lieutenant-General Miles Dempsey

=== Order of battle ===
==== Operation Overlord ====
- I Corps
- VIII Corps
- XII Corps
- XXX Corps

==== Operation Market Garden ====
- VIII Corps
- XII Corps
- XXX Corps

== See also ==
- Battle of Villers-Bocage
- Operation Charnwood
- Operation Goodwood
- Operation Perch
- Operation Windsor
- Second Battle of the Odon

=== Second Army landing zones during Operation Overlord ===
- Gold Beach
- Juno Beach (First Canadian Army's 3rd Canadian Division and 2nd Canadian Armoured Brigade)
- Sword Beach
