= Operation Plunder =

Part of a coordinated set of Rhine crossings during WWII

- Part of the Western Allied invasion of Germany in the Western Front of the European theatre of World War II
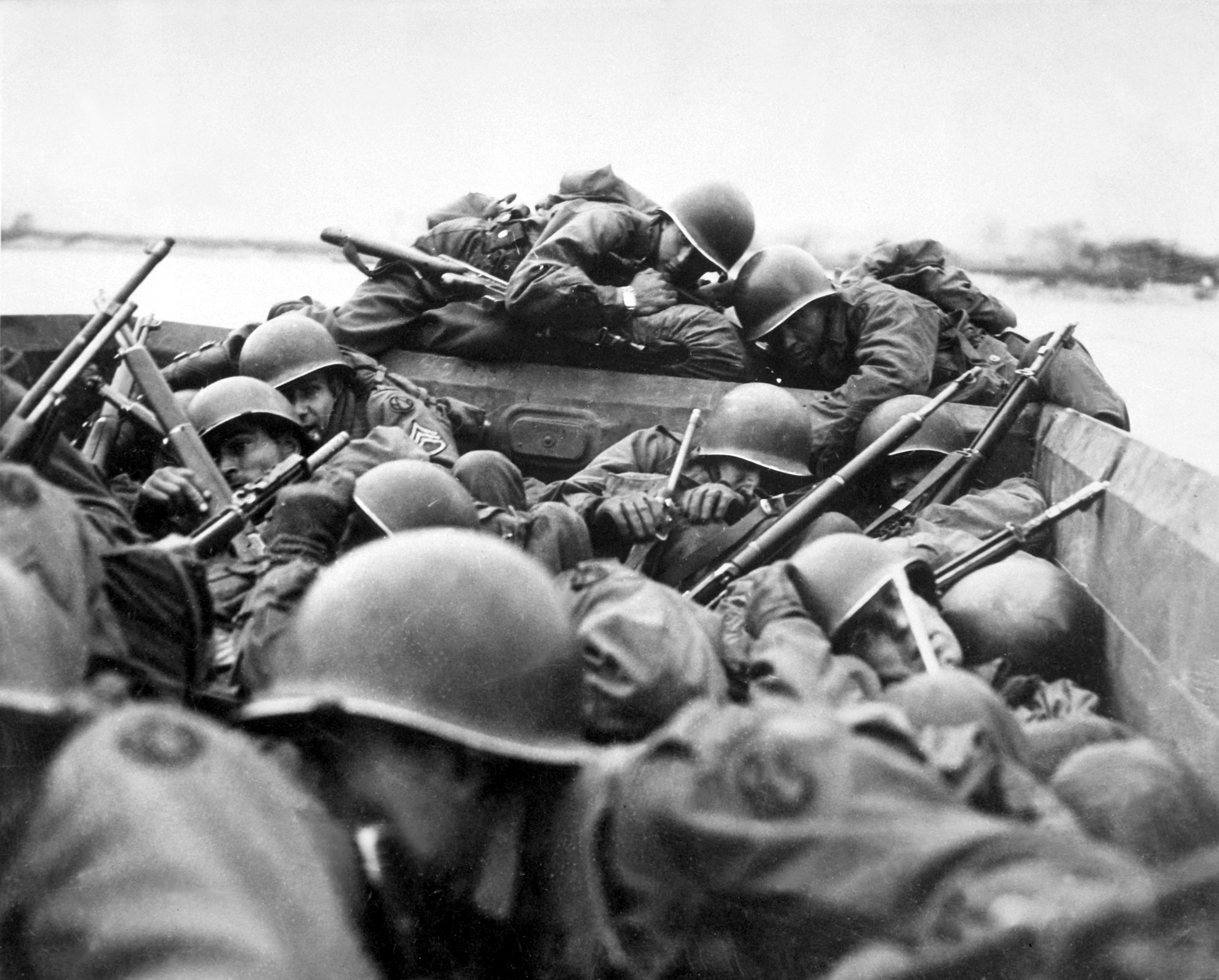
- U.S. 89th Division crossing the Rhine under fire
Date	23–27 March 1945
Location	Lower Rhine region, Germany
Result	Allied victory

Belligerents
United Kingdom; United States; Canada	Germany

Commanders and leaders
(United Kingdom) Bernard Montgomery; (United Kingdom) Miles Dempsey; (United States) William H. Simpson	(Nazi Germany) Johannes Blaskowitz; (Nazi Germany) Alfred Schlemm

Units involved
21st Army Group; British 2nd Army; U.S. 9th Army; 9th Canadian Infantry Brigade	Army Group H; 1st Parachute Army

Strength
1,284,712 men; 5,481 artillery pieces	69,000 men; 45 tanks

Casualties and losses
United Kingdom; 3,968 casualties; United States; 2,813 casualties; 6,781 casualties total	16,000 captured

Operation Plunder was a military operation to cross the Rhine on the night of 23 March 1945, launched by the 21st Army Group under Field Marshal Bernard Montgomery. The crossing of the river was at Rees, Wesel, and south of the river Lippe by the British Second Army under Lieutenant General Miles Dempsey, and the United States Ninth Army under Lieutenant General William H. Simpson.

The Battle of the Rhine was crucial for the Allied advance into Germany, and was planned by Montgomery as a three-army assault, including an airborne assault, a five-thousand-gun artillery barrage, and Anglo-American bombers. Thousands of tons of supplies were brought forward including huge amounts of bridging equipment.

The First Allied Airborne Army conducted Operation Varsity on the east bank of the Rhine in support of Operation Plunder, consisting of U.S. XVIII Airborne Corps, the British 6th, and the U.S. 17th Airborne Divisions.

Operation Grenade in February by Simpson's Ninth Army and Harry Crerar's First Canadian Army was also expected to prepare the ground.

Preparations such as accumulation of supplies, road construction, and the transport of 36 Royal Navy landing craft, were hidden by a massive smoke screen from 16 March. The operation commenced on the night of 23 March 1945. It included the Varsity parachute and glider landings near Wesel, and Operation Archway, by the Special Air Service.

== Battle ==
Four thousand Allied guns fired for four hours during the opening bombardment. British bombers contributed with attacks on Wesel during the day and night of 23 March 1945.

On the night of 23 March, companies E and C of the 17th Armored Engineer Battalion, part of the U.S. 2nd Armored Division, constructed treadway rafts to prepare the crossing of the Rhine about five kilometers south of Wesel. Bridge construction started at 9:45 a.m. and by 4:00 p.m. the first truck crossed the floating pontoon bridge. Over 1,152 feet (351 m) of M2 treadway and 93 pneumatic floats were laid in the six hours and fifteen minute construction project, a record setting for the size of the bridge. It took twenty-five 2 1/2 ton GMC CCKW trucks to transport the bridge parts to the construction site, part of the Red Ball Express.

Three Allied formations made the initial assault: the British XII Corps and XXX Corps and the U.S. XVI Corps. The British 79th Armoured Division—under Major General Percy Hobart—had been at the front of the Normandy landings and provided invaluable help in subsequent operations with specially adapted armored vehicles (known as Hobart's Funnies). One "funny" was the LVT-2 "Buffalo" operated by the 4th Royal Tank Regiment, under the command of Lieutenant Colonel Alan Jolly, an armed and armoured amphibious tracked personnel or cargo transporter, which was able to cross soft and flooded ground. These were the vehicles for the spearhead infantry.

The first part of Plunder within the framework of XXX Corp's Operation Turnscrew was initiated by the 51st (Highland) Infantry Division, led by the 7th Battalion, Black Watch (Royal Highland Regiment) of 154th Brigade at 21:00 on 23 March, near Rees, followed by the 7th Battalion, Argyll and Sutherland Highlanders (also of 154th Brigade). At 02:00 on 24 March, the 15th (Scottish) Infantry Division landed between Wesel and Rees. At first, there was no opposition, but later they ran into determined resistance from machine-gun nests. On the same day the 51st Division's commander, Major-General Tom Rennie, was killed by mortar fire. The British 1st Commando Brigade entered Wesel.

The U.S. 30th Infantry Division landed south of Wesel. The local resistance had been broken by artillery and air bombardment. Subsequently, the U.S. 79th Infantry Division also landed. American casualties were minimal. German resistance to the British landings continued with some effect, and there were armored counter-attacks. Landings continued, however, including tanks and other heavy equipment. U.S. forces had a bridge across by the evening of 24 March.

Operation Varsity started at 10:00 on 24 March, to disrupt enemy communications. Despite heavy resistance to the airdrops and afterward, the airborne troops made progress and repelled counterattacks. The hard lessons of Operation Market Garden were applied. In the afternoon, the 15th (Scottish) Division linked up with both airborne divisions.

Fierce German resistance continued around Bienen, north of Rees, where the entire 9th Canadian Infantry Brigade was needed to relieve the Black Watch. The bridgehead was firmly established, however, and Allied advantages in numbers and equipment were applied. By 27 March, the bridgehead was 35 miles (56 km) wide and 20 miles (32 km) deep.

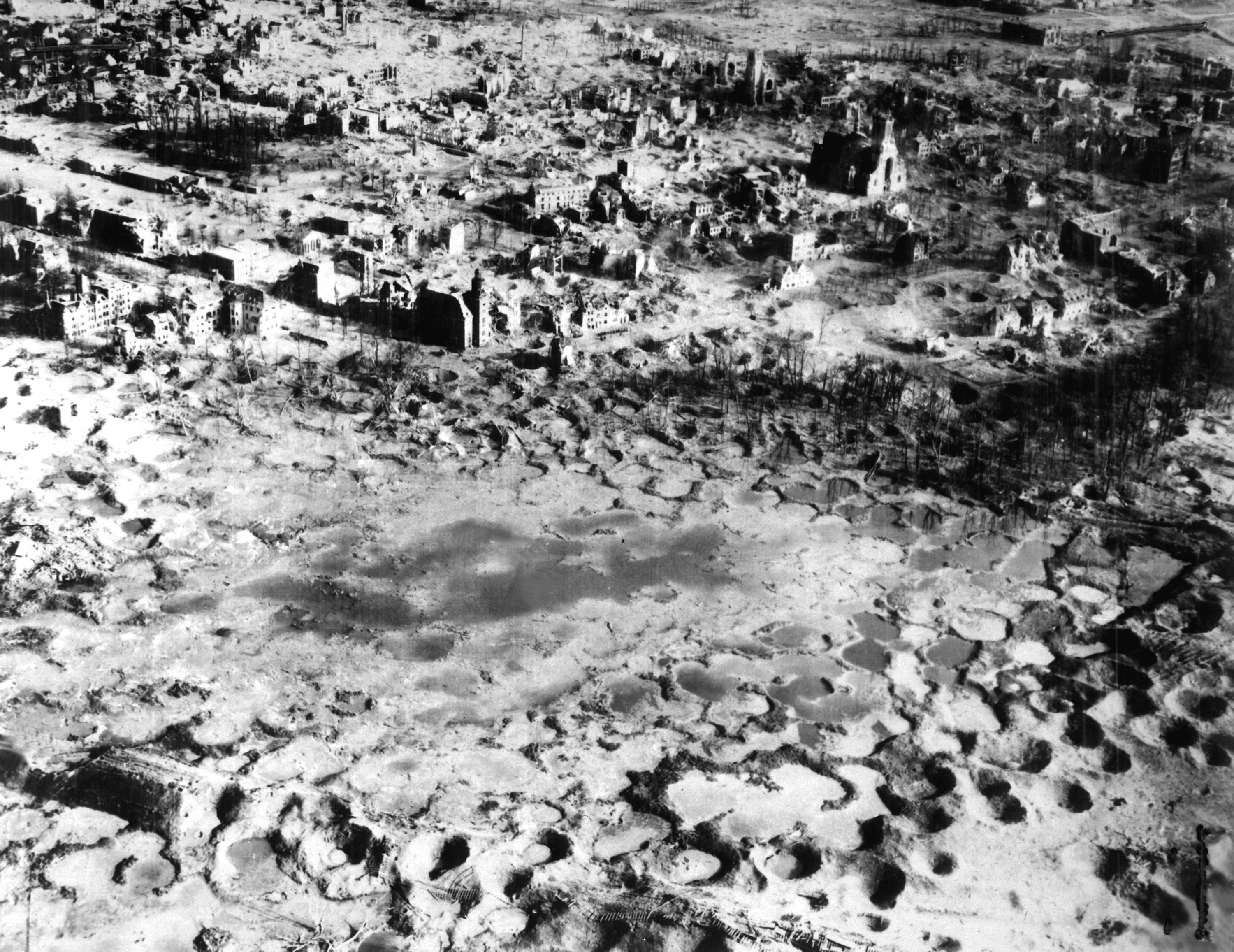
The city of Wesel in ruins after Allied bombardment, March 1945

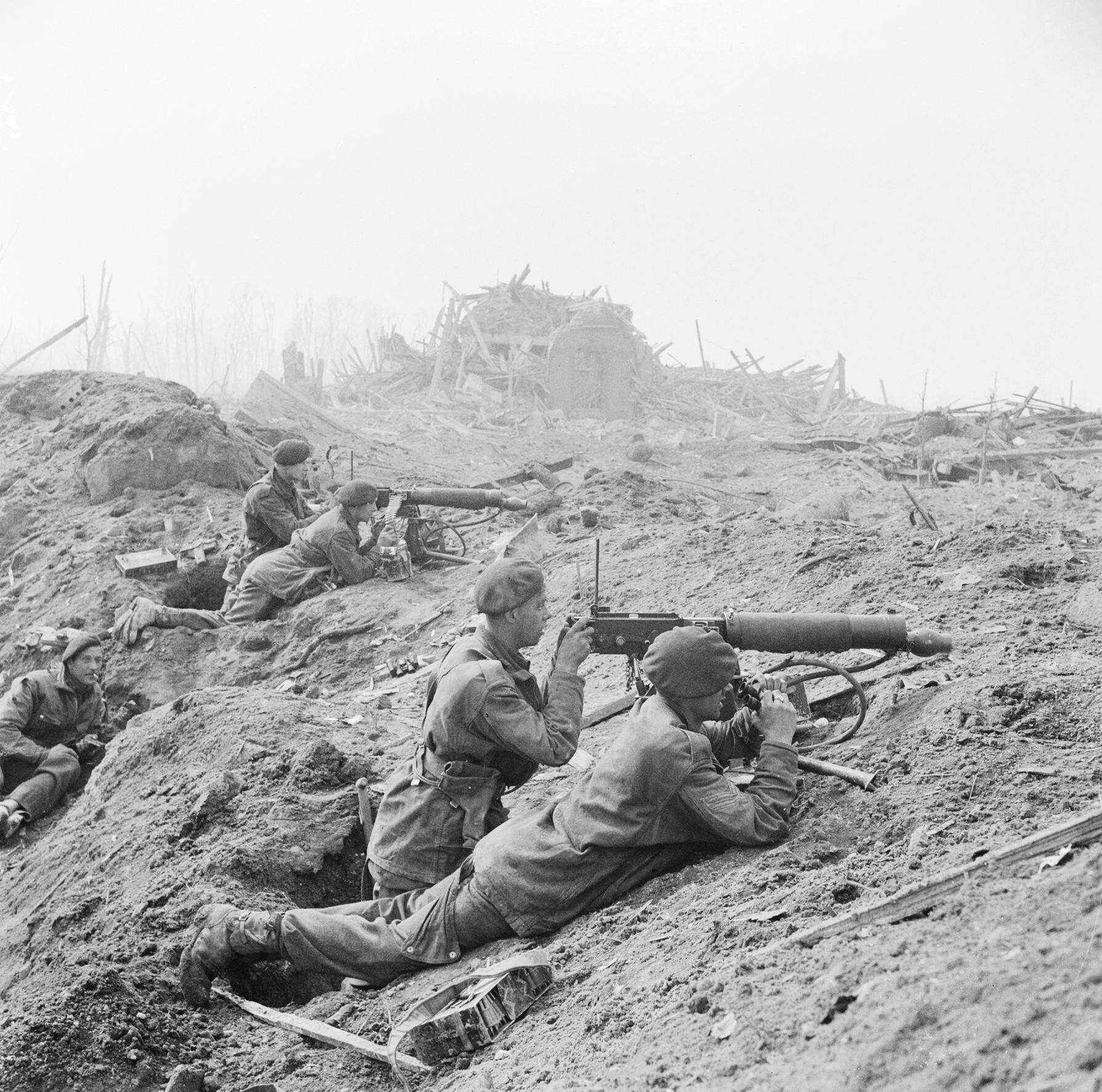
British Commandos on the outskirts of Wesel

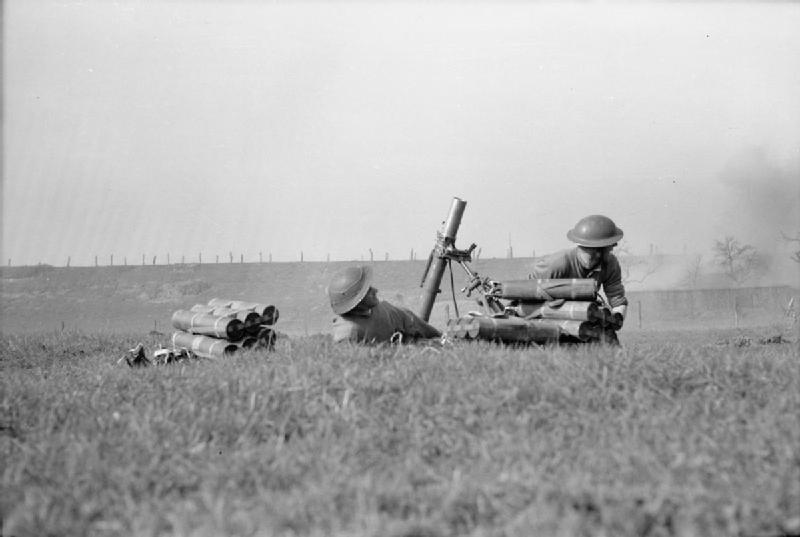
3-inch mortar of the 8th Royal Scots during the Rhine crossing, 24 March 1945

== Aftermath ==
=== Impact on German forces and command ===
The Allied operation was opposed by the German 1st Parachute Army, commanded by General Alfred Schlemm, a part of Army Group H. Although this formation was considered to be the most effective German force in the area, it was severely depleted from its previous action in the Battle of the Reichswald. Unable to withstand Allied pressure, the 1st Parachute Army withdrew northeast toward Hamburg and Bremen, leaving a gap between it and the 15th Army in the Ruhr.

Joseph Goebbels was well aware of Plunder's potential impact from the beginning. On 24 March, he began his diary entry with, "The situation in the West has entered an extraordinarily critical, ostensibly almost deadly, phase." He went on to note the crossing of the Rhine on a broad front, and foresaw Allied attempts to encircle the Ruhr industrial heartland.

On 27 March, command of the 1st Parachute Army was passed to General Günther Blumentritt, because Schlemm had been wounded. Blumentritt and his superior, Generaloberst Johannes Blaskowitz, both recognised that the situation was lost. The army's front was incomplete, there were no reserves, weak artillery, no air support and few tanks. Communications were weak, indeed, one corps was never contacted. The reinforcements were so poor that the generals decided against using them, to avoid needless casualties.

Although Blumentritt had strict orders from Supreme Command to hold and fight, from 1 April, he managed a withdrawal with minimal casualties, eventually withdrawing beyond the Dortmund-Ems Canal to the Teutoburg Forest. Within a week of the start of Plunder, the Allies had taken 30,000 prisoners of war north of the Ruhr.

=== Winston Churchill ===
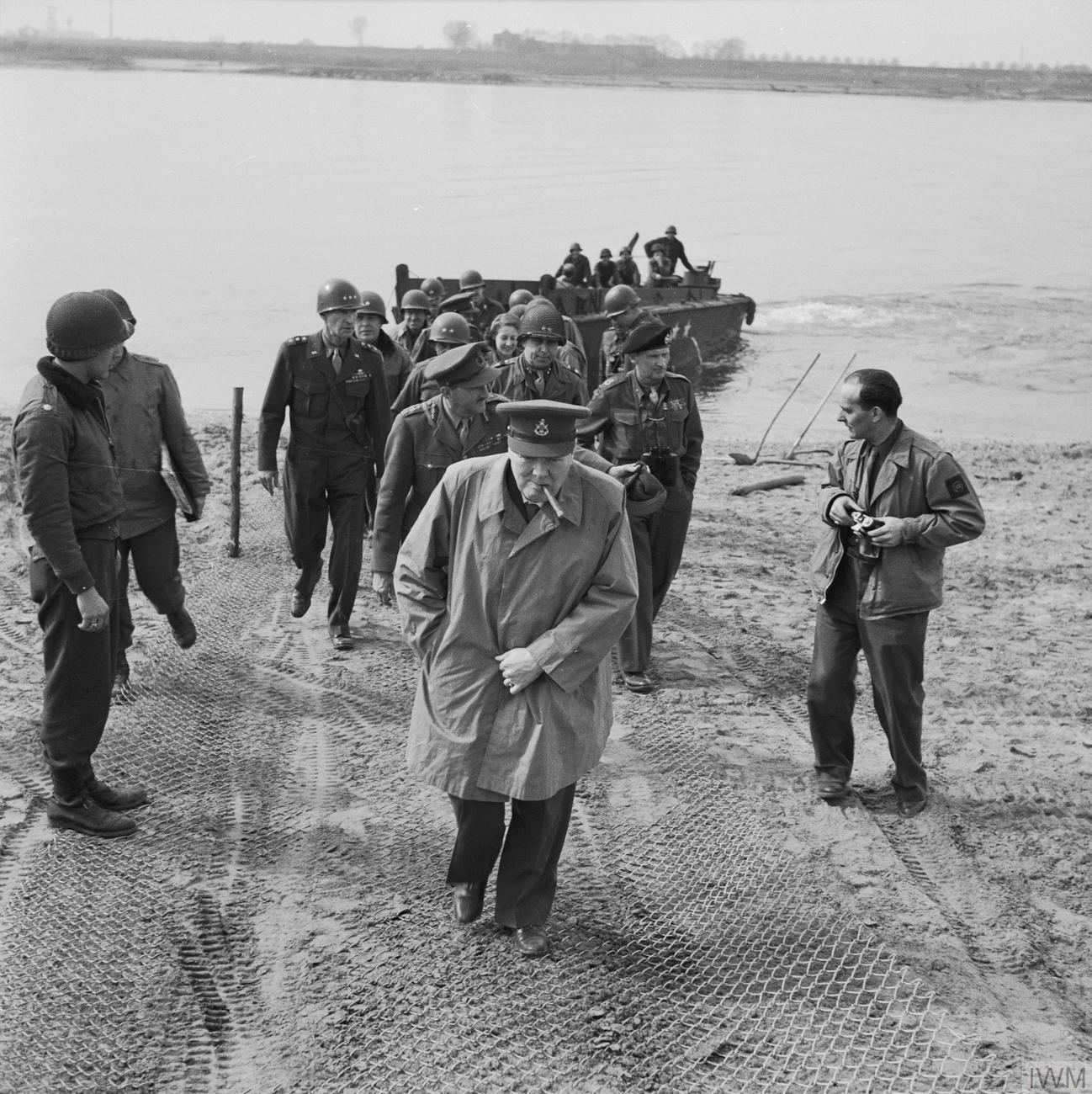
Winston Churchill, General William H. Simpson, Field Marshal Alan Brooke, and Field Marshal Bernard Montgomery on the German-held east bank of the Rhine, 25 March 1945

British Prime Minister Winston Churchill was present at Field Marshal Montgomery's headquarters near Venlo on the eve of Plunder. Subsequently, Churchill and Montgomery watched the Varsity air landings on 24 March.

The next day, 25 March, Churchill and Montgomery visited General Dwight D. Eisenhower′s headquarters. After lunch and a briefing, the party went to a sandbagged house overlooking the Rhine and a quiet, undefended stretch of the German-held riverbank. After Eisenhower's departure, Churchill, Montgomery, and a party of U.S. commanders and armed guards took a LCVP landing craft and landed for 30 minutes in enemy territory, without challenge. They next visited the destroyed railway bridge at Wesel, departing when German artillery appeared to target them.

=== Military rivalries ===
The Plunder crossings in the third week of March were planned as the primary assault across the Rhine, but at the Yalta Conference in early February 1945, it was decided to add another crossing to the south of the Ruhr. The additional crossing was intended to draw off any concentration of forces in opposition to Plunder. Two earlier crossings actually happened.

On 7 March, U.S. troops unexpectedly captured the Ludendorff Bridge as a result of the Battle of Remagen. Within the next 10 days six divisions and 25,000 troops established a bridgehead on the eastern side of the Rhine.

On 22 March, General George S. Patton sent his Third Army across the Rhine, at Nierstein, to form another bridgehead. His superior, General Omar Bradley, released news of this crossing to the press "at a time calculated to take some of the lustre from the news of Montgomery′s crossing". Bradley later remembered that Patton had strongly urged the announcement saying "I want the world to know that Third Army made it before Monty starts across", although this is not how the operations of the two formations bore out.

== In culture ==
- "Crossing the Rhine", Episode 8 of The Lost Evidence, The History Channel, UK, 2004.
- Heinz Bosch, Wilhelm Haas: Der Krieg am Niederrhein, Kreis Kleve, 1976 (German).
- "World War II": season 5, episode 8 of Drunk History.

== See also ==
- Ludendorff Bridge, the bridge at Remagen

== Bibliography ==
- Churchill, Winston (1960). The Second World War. London: Cassell. pp. 301–305.
- Delaforce, Patrick (2015). Onslaught on Hitler's Rhine: Operations Plunder and Varsity, March 1945. England: Fonthill Media. ISBN 978-1-78-155441-8.
- Ford, K. (2007). The Rhine Crossings 1945. Osprey. ISBN 978-1-84-603026-0.
- MacDonald, Charles B (1973). "Chapter XIII The Rhine Crossings in the South". The Last Offensive. United States Army in World War II European Theater of Operations. Office of the Chief of Military History, Department of the Army.
- Moore, William (1986). Decisive Battles. England: Windward. pp. 118–124. ISBN 0-7112-0453-5.
- Saunders, Tim (2006). Operation Plunder. Battleground Europe. Barnsley: Pen & Sword. ISBN 1-84415-221-9.
- Shulman, Milton (1995). Defeat in the West. Chailey: Masquerade. pp. 310–311. ISBN 1-872947-03-4.
- Trigg, Jonathan (2020). To VE Day Through German Eyes: The Final Defeat of Nazi Germany. Stroud, Gloucestershire, UK: Amberley Publishing. ISBN 978-1-4456-9944-8.
