= Ninth Army (United States) =

- Ninth Army shoulder sleeve insignia
- Active: 15 April 1944–10 October 1945; 26 January 2012–1 October 2020
- Country: United States of America
- Branch: United States Army
- Type: Field army
- Engagements: World War II; Northern France; Rhineland; Central Europe

Commanders
- Notable commanders: GEN William Hood Simpson

Insignia
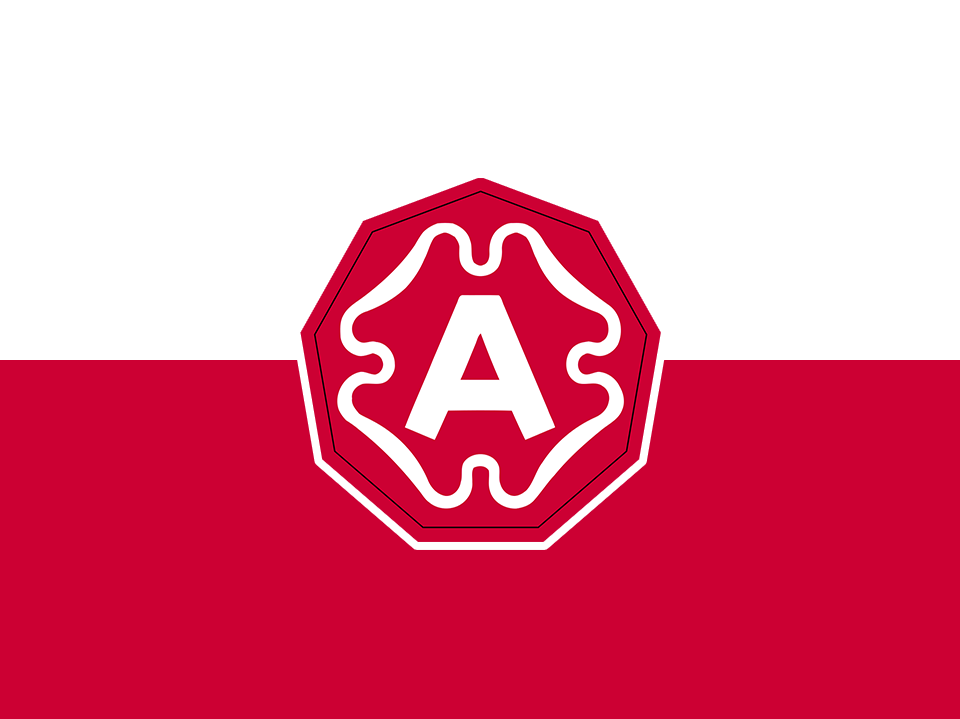
- Flag of the Ninth Army

The Ninth Army was a field army of the United States Army, most recently garrisoned at Caserma Ederle, Vicenza, Italy. It was the United States Army Service Component Command of United States Africa Command (USAFRICOM or AFRICOM).

Activated just eight weeks before the June 1944 Normandy landings, the Ninth Army was one of the main U.S. Army commands which fought in Northwest Europe in 1944 and 1945. It was commanded at its inception by Lieutenant General William Simpson. It had been designated Eighth Army, but on arrival in the United Kingdom it was renamed to avoid confusion with the British formation of the same designation, taking the name of a unit of the fictitious First United States Army Group prepared for Operation Quicksilver. All American field armies in the European Theatre of Operation were designated with odd numbers; even numbered field armies fought in the Pacific War.

== History ==
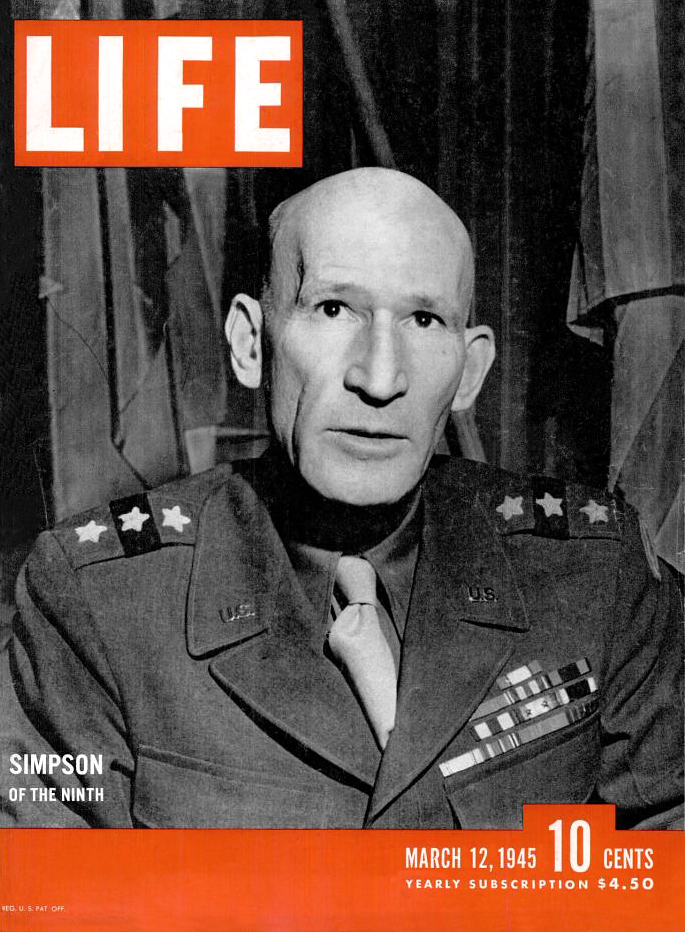
Lieutenant General William Hood Simpson, commander of the Ninth Army (Life, 12 March 1945)

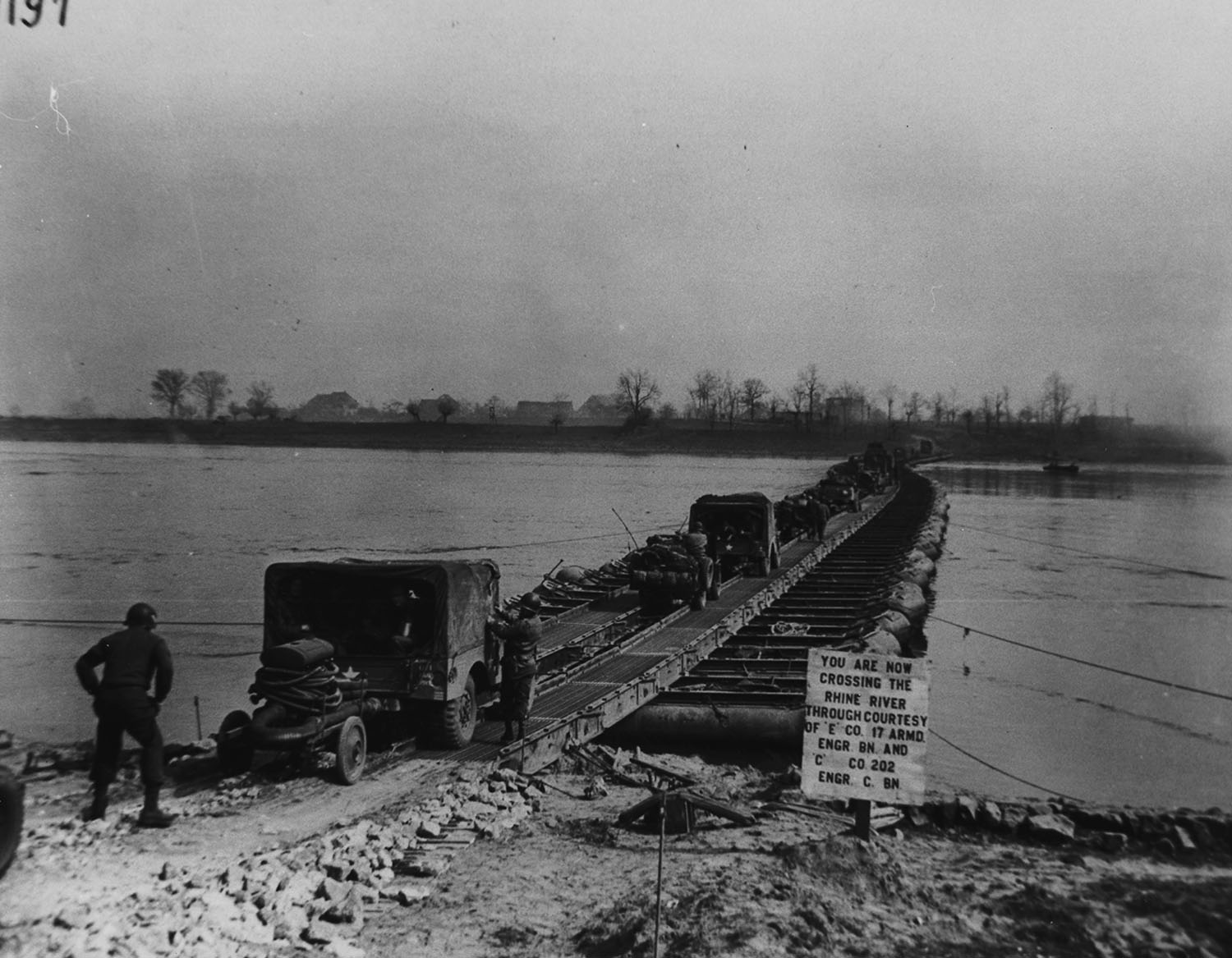
U.S. 9th Army crossing the Rhine River. Wallach. M2, steel treadway, pontoon bridge, late March, 1945)

The first responsibility for Ninth Army, upon its arrival on 5 September was to take part in the final reduction of the German forces holding out in the French port of Brest. After the surrender of the town fifteen days later, Ninth Army was sent east to take its place in the line. It came into the line between Third Army and First Army.

In November, Ninth Army was shifted to the very northern flank of 12th Army Group. It undertook operations to close the front up to the Roer River. 16 December saw the opening of the last great German offensive of the war, the Battle of the Bulge. Ninth Army was isolated from the headquarters of 12th Army Group, and it was thus placed (on 20 December) under the command of General Bernard Montgomery's 21st Army Group along with First Army, despite opposition from General Omar Bradley. Simpson reoriented his command quickly to help in the reduction of the salient that the Germans had created. Many of Ninth Army's units passed to the command of First Army, which was doing the main work of reducing the German salient from the north. In the meantime, the remainder of Ninth Army continued to hold the line along the Roer. When First Army and Third Army had finished reducing the salient, First Army returned to the command of 12th Army Group, but Ninth Army remained under the command of 21st Army Group for the remainder of the Rhineland Campaign.

In late February 1945 the Ninth Army launched Operation Grenade, which was the southern prong of a pincer attack coordinated with Canadian First Army's Operation Veritable, with the purpose of closing the front up to the Rhine. By 10 March, the Rhine had been reached in all sectors of Ninth Army's front. It was not until after 20 March that Ninth Army units first crossed the Rhine itself (Operation Flashpoint). However, after doing so, the Army quickly struck east around the north of the Ruhr. An enormous pocket soon formed containing the German Army Group B under Walter Model. By 4 April, Ninth Army had reached the Weser and was switched back to 12th Army Group.

The end was now clearly in sight, and as part of Ninth Army, along with the newly arrived Fifteenth Army, reduced the enormous Ruhr Pocket, other elements reached the Elbe on 12 April. On 2 May 1945, the whole of Ninth Army's front reached the agreed demarcation point with the Russians, and the advance ceased. Around 7 May 1945, the Ninth Army accepted around 100,000 prisoners from the German Twelfth Army under General Walther Wenck, and the German Ninth Army (Germany) under General Theodor Busse.

On 15 June 1945 the units of the Ninth Army were turned over to the Seventh United States Army and the Ninth Army headquarters prepared to redeploy to China to support combat operations against the Japanese. On 8 July Ninth Army headquarters had moved to Deauville, France to prepare for re-deployment to the United States. On 27 July the headquarters boarded the Army transport ship John Ericsson bound for New York City, where it arrived on 6 August, the same date of the atomic bombing of Hiroshima. The headquarters then was moved to Camp Shanks, New York for administrative processing prior to deployment to China.

The Japanese surrendered on 15 August and the planned deployment to China was cancelled. The headquarters was moved to Fort Bragg, North Carolina in mid-September for demobilization and was inactivated on 10 October 1945.

== Units ==
Units included the 2nd Infantry Division, the 8th Infantry Division, 8th Armored Division, the 2nd Ranger Battalion, the 5th Ranger Battalion, the 29th Infantry Division, the 30th Infantry Division, the 6th Armored Division, the 104th Infantry Division, the 84th Infantry Division, the 7th Armored Division, and the 79th Infantry Division.

== Reactivation ==
In 2012, U.S. Army Africa was re-designated as US Army Africa (Ninth Army) under the Army modularization program.

Following its reformation, the army controlled the following units;

- United States Army Africa Headquarters and Headquarters Battalion, Caserma Carlo Ederle, Italy
- 207th Military Intelligence Brigade (Operational Control)
- 1st Infantry Division (Aligned), Fort Riley, Kansas
  - 2nd Brigade Combat Team, 2nd Infantry Division (Aligned), Fort Riley, Kansas
- 82nd Civil Affairs Battalion, Fort Stewart, Georgia
- OUA Division, Liberia
  - Engineering Brigade, Liberia

In 2020, U.S. Army Africa was merged with U.S. Army Europe to form a new command, U.S. Army Europe-Africa.

== Insignia ==
The nine-sided figure indicates the numerical designation of the organization. The shoulder sleeve insignia was approved on 21 September 1944. The red and white colors reflect that the headquarters of the Ninth Army was the headquarters of the Fourth Army under a new name.

== See also ==
- Operation Queen
- Operation Plunder
