= 17th Armored Engineer Battalion =

17th Engineer Battalion
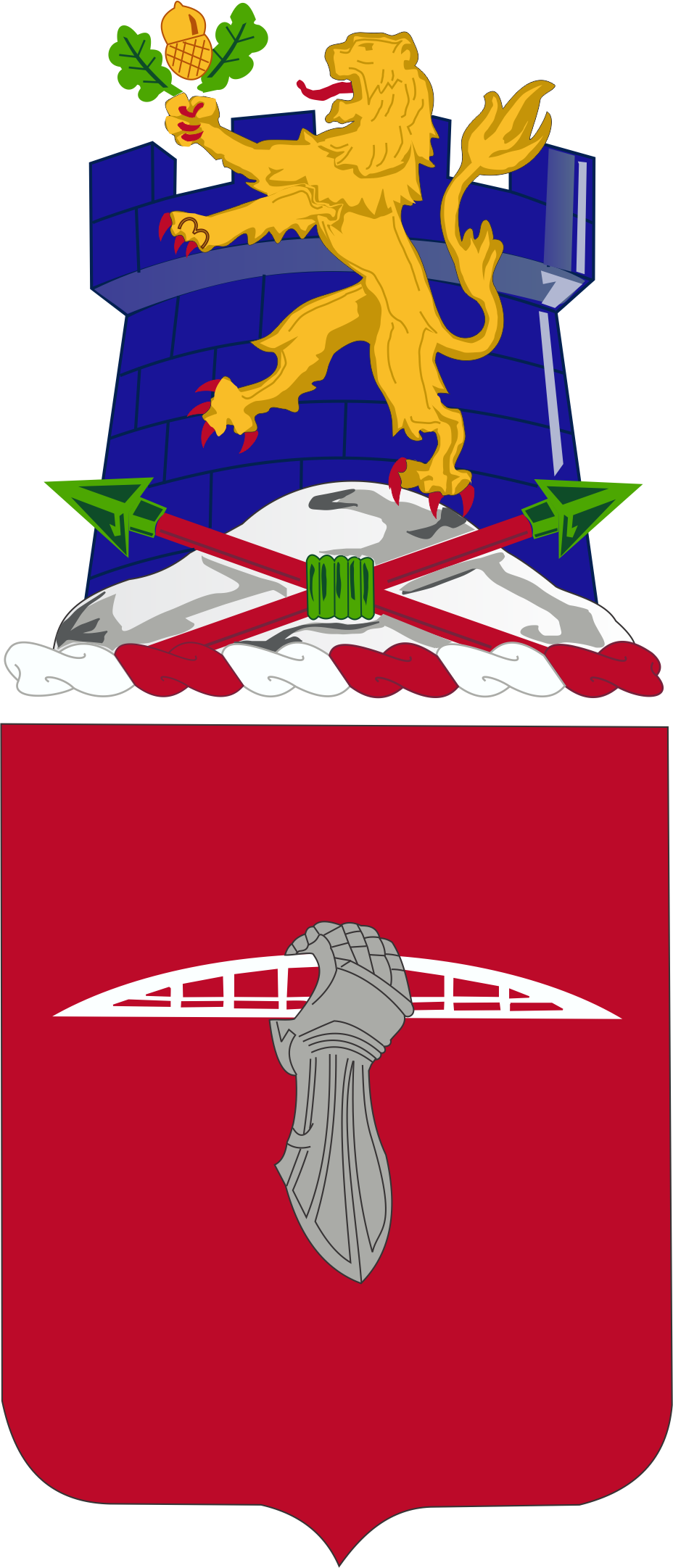
- Coat of Arms
- Active: 1917 – 1995
- Country: United States
- Allegiance: Regular Army
- Branch: US Army Corps of Engineers
- Motto: "WE PAVE THE WAY"
- Colors: Red and Grey
- Engagements: World War II; Algeria-French Morocco; Italy; Normandy; Alsace; Battle of the Bulge; Defense of Saudi Arabia; Liberation and Defense of Kuwait

Insignia
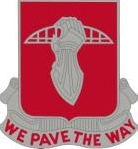
- Distinctive Unit Insignia

The 17th Armored Engineer Battalion was a part of the 2nd Armored Division "Hell on Wheels". During World War II, they were active in North African Campaign, and Western Europe Campaign. 17th Armored Engineer Battalion was founded on 1 October 1933 as part of the US Army. First called 17th Engineer Battalion (Heavy Ponton), Motorized. It was renamed on 10 July 1940 to 17th Engineer Battalion (Armored) and assigned to the 2nd Armored Division. The unit became active and started training 15 July 1940 at Fort Benning, Georgia. Renamed again on 8 January 1942 as the 17th Armored Engineer Battalion. The battalion's motto was We pave the way. Tasks of the 17 included construction and demolition under combat conditions, constructing and breaching trenches, tank traps and other fortifications, bunker construction, bridge and road construction, and building destruction bridges and other physical work in the battlefield whenever needed. They also laid and cleared land mines. The 17th facilitated the movement and support of friendly forces while slowing down the enemy's forces.

== World War II training ==
Training started at Fort Benning, in Columbus, Georgia.

After organizing the new battalion, training in engineering skills started. The battalion average age of the enlisted men was 22 years. Then men had two and a half months of basic training behind. Training included: M1 carbine Rifle marksmanship, mines, minefields, Demining fixed dry gullies bridge construct, floating Pontoon bridge construct, road repair-making, Military engineering vehicles-DUKW use, and other field combat problems. Training include Live fire exercise and live mine exercises, to make the men battle ready. Colonel George S. Patton was in charge of training the new 2nd Armored division.

== World War II ==
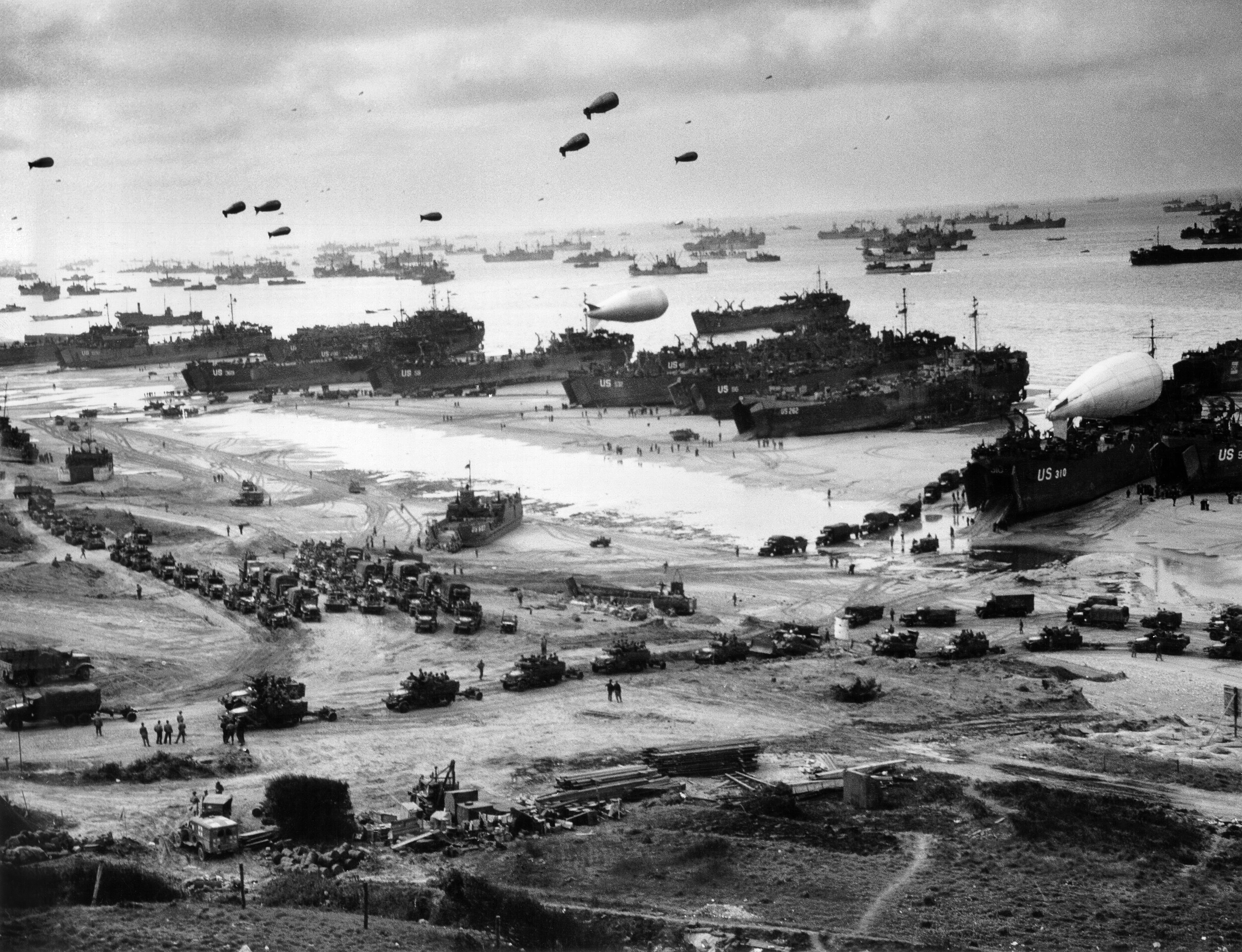
Landing ships putting cargo ashore on Omaha Beach, at low tide during the first days of the operation

17th Armored Engineer Battalion moved with the 2nd Armored Division to North Africa, Sicily, England, France, Belgium and Germany, under the command of the First Army.

== North Africa ==
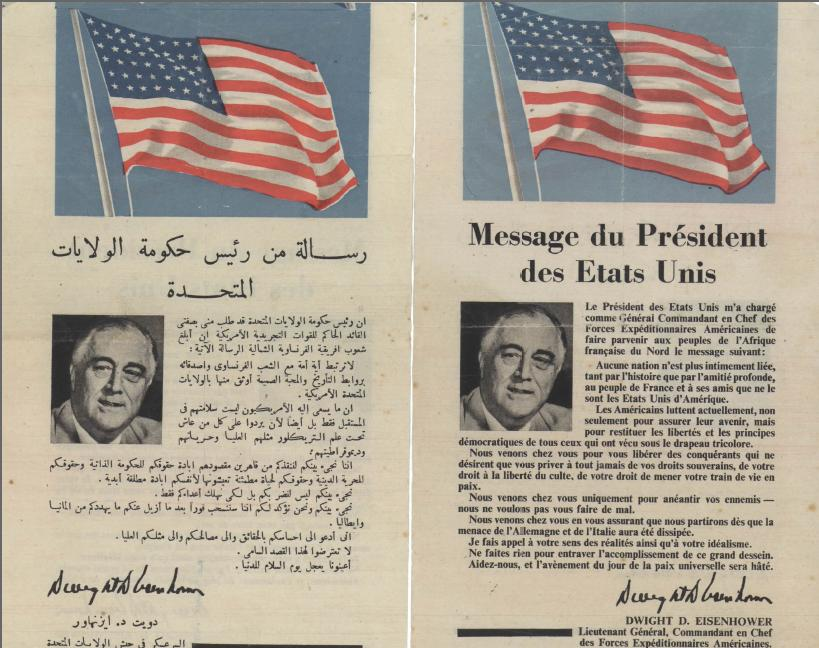
Flyer that was distributed by the Allied forces in the streets of Casablanca, calling the citizens to cooperate with the Allied forces

As part of the North African Campaign, and Operation Torch the 17th took part in landing French North Africa's Algeria and Morocco. The major task in North Africa was landing clear and mine removal. 17th landing were early morning on 8 November 1942. In Morocco the landing was in Safi as part of Operation Blackstone.

== Sicily ==
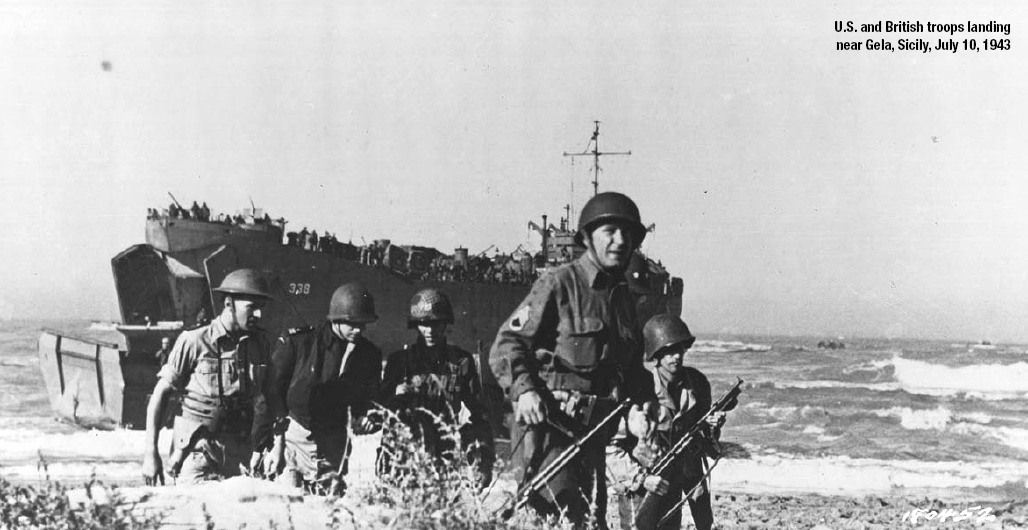
American and British troops landing near Gela, Sicily, 10 July 1943

As part of Operation Husky order of battle in the Sicily Campaign, the 17th Armored Engineer Battalion with the 2nd Armor Division landed in Gela, Sicily in south-central Sicily, on 11 July 1943. Before the landing the 17th used M4 Sherman tanks with Scorpion Mine flail exploder to clear the way. The operation captured Butera and participated in the Battle of Mazzarino, then moving on to Palermo. After Sicily the 17th moved to England to train and prepare for D-Day.

== Normandy ==
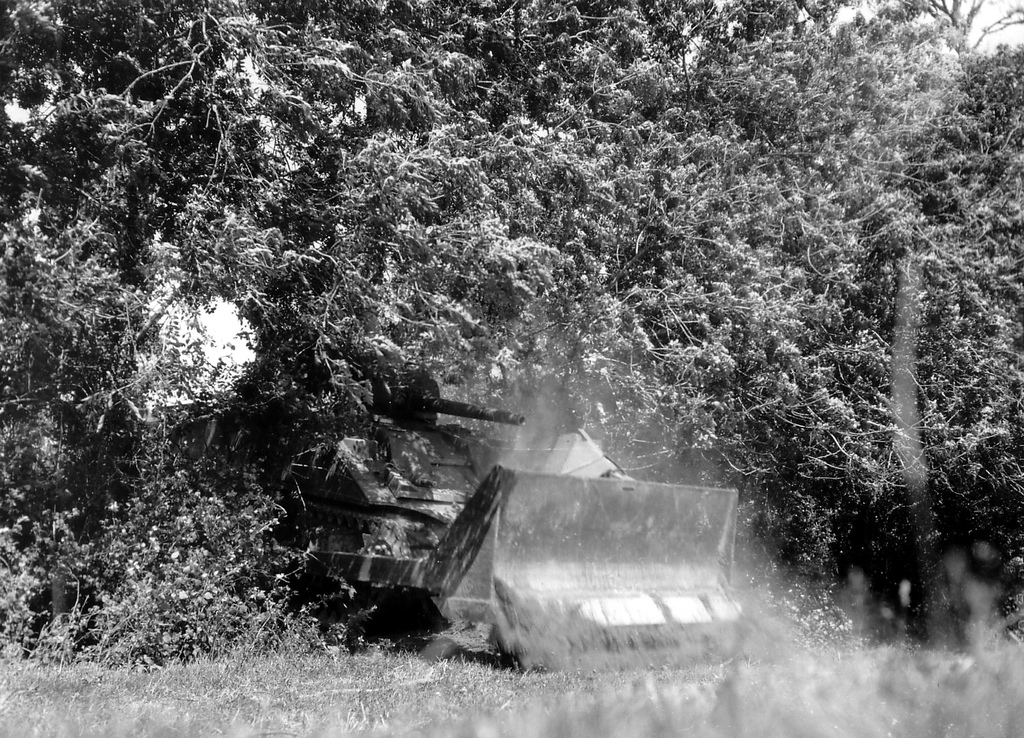
M4 Sherman tank mounted with M1 bulldozer blade makes its way through a hedge in France, 1944

On 9 June 1944, D-day plus 3, along with other battalions, the 17th battalion landed on Utah Beach in Normandy as a part of the Normandy landings and Operation Overlord. They cleared lanes for landing craft by destroying the mine-bearing steel structures that the Germans had implanted in the intertidal zone. They bulldozed roads up the narrow draws through the cliffs lining the beaches. 17th Armored Engineer Battalion were issued new camouflage uniforms for D-Day. These uniforms are the same one used by US Marine Corps in the Pacific. To clear barricades, mine fields, fill in caters and break through thick hedgerows the 17th used M4 Sherman Tanks mounting with M1 bulldozer. Also used was Caterpillar D7 with armor plates added to the engine and cab. The tank bulldozer broke through the hedgerows in France. Germans learned to wait until the tanks cross with infantry following on foot then fire on both. To counter, forces started with their main guns loaded with canister and pointed to the rear and to the flanks. As the tanks crossed they fired parallel to the hedges, inflicting enemy casualties, this became known as "Roosevelt's Butchers,". From Omaha Beach the battalion pushed through the Cherbourg peninsula and built bridge across the Seine river in France.

== Albert Canal bridge ==
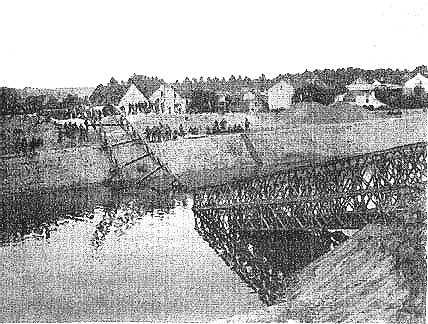
First bridge over the Albert Canal, a failure, Sept 1944

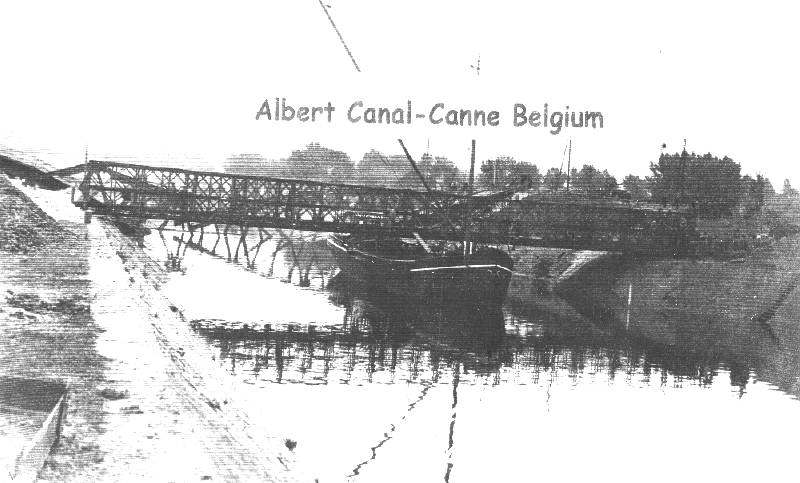
Albert Canal bridge with support boat, 15 September 1944

As part of aftermath of the Battle of Fort Eben-Emael, the 17th and 82nd Armored Engineer Battalion work build a Bailey bridge across the Albert Canal at the village of Kanne. The first try failed as the bridge fell into the canal. On 15 September 1944 with the help of a boat for support the bridge was completed. Albert canal functioned as a defense line for the retreating enemy.

== Geleenbeek stream ==
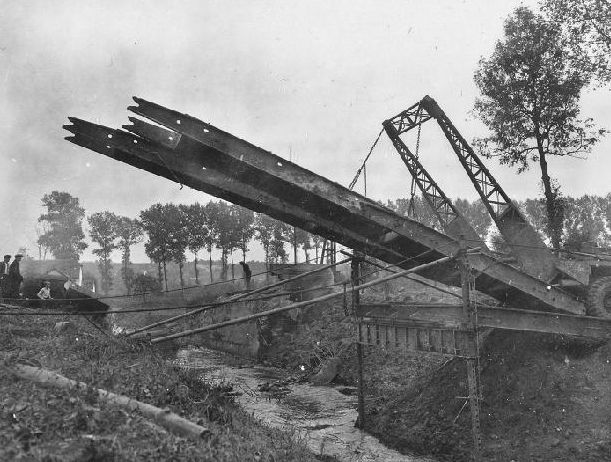
Bridge across the Geleenbeek stream

On 18 September 1944 the 17th built a bridge across the Geleenbeek stream near Kathagermolen as all the bridges across the stream around Schinnen had been destroyed by the retreating German army. During the construction, the engineers were fired on by enemy machine gun emplacements in the treeline on the far bank. The gunfire missed the engineers and a US tank responded, firing several high-explosive rounds into the trees and silencing the enemy guns. Two 60 feet beam bridges were completed: one at Kathagermolen and one at Schinnen. The 17th saw frequent action fighting in Alsace. On 26 November 1944 at Ciney, Belgium, as part of the Ardennes Offensive, Gen. Collier was ordered by Gen. Harmon to hold Ciney with the combined forces of the 2nd Armored Battalion, the 41st Armored Infantry, the 2nd Bn. 66th Armor, a platoon from "A" Company of the 17th Engineers, and another platoon from "A" Company of the 702d Tank Destroyer Bn. The 17th Armored Engineers was ordered to secure Merzenhausen and Barmen to cut off communication lines to the Roer as part of Operation Queen. In Lonlay-l'Abbaye the 17th blew up a bridge in center of town before moving on to blow up an enemy ammunition dump.

== Battle of the Bulge ==
During the Battle of the Bulge, quick thinking and action of the engineers destroyed key bridges in the path of advancing German forces, slowing and diverting them while Allied forces regrouped. Battle of the Bulge was fought in the bitter cold from 16 December 1944 to 25 January 1945.

== Seine River ==
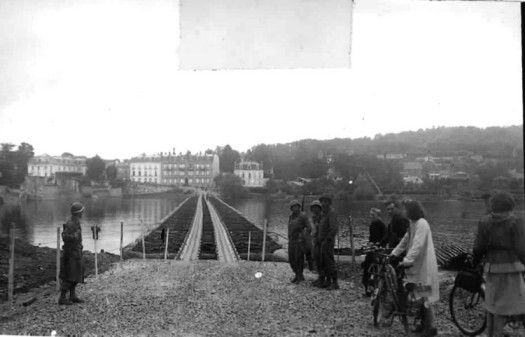
Floating bridge over the Seine river, 28 August 1944

17th Armored Engineers with 82nd Engineer Combat Regiment built a floating bridge over the Seine River at Meulan France on 30 August 1944. The bridge was started at 8am, opened at 6pm, it was 720 ft. in length. 17th bridge company did not have enough saddles to put on top of the floating pontoons, so a short trestle bridge was built near the far part of the bridge. Approaches to the bridge were made of sommerfeld mat over chespaling mat, with three inches of gravel.

== Rhine crossing ==
Night of 23 March 1945, as part of the Western Allied invasion of Germany and Operation Plunder, Company E and C of the 17th Armored Engineer Battalion, constructed two treadway rafts to prepare of the crossing of the Rhine River about five kilometers south of Wesel. Bridge construction started at 9:45 am and by 4:00 pm the first truck crossed the floating bridge. Over 1152 feet of M2 treadway and 93 pneumatic floats were used in just six hours and fifteen minute construction project, record setting for the size of the bridge. It took twenty five 2 half tons GMC CCKW trucks to transport the bridge parts to the construction site, part of the Red Ball Express.

A steel treadway bridge needed floating pontoons. A saddles on top of the pontoon put the weight of the bridge on the pontoon. A 12-foot sections of treadway track was bolted to the saddles. The treadway sections were put together on the spot unloaded for many truck. The sections were taken out to the end of the bridge in construction. The sections were connected together with large steel pins. The 17th was experienced with treadway bridges, but this was the largest one. To cross the Rhine would need 80 or 90 sections to complete the bridge. Moving the sections then pounding in the large pins was hard work. These bridge could carry a heavy load including a 66,800 pound M4 tanks. The floating pontoon was an 18-ton pressurized rubber bag. The saddle was the metal and plywood frame was placed on the float and supported the treadway tracks. To prefabricate the bridge the pontoon had to be inflated; the saddles had to be assembled and lashed to the top of the pontoon. On 30 March 1945 Company "C", constructed a treadway bridge across the canal near Alvert. On 5 April 1945, the 17th Engr. Bn. constructed a 384 treadway across the Weser at Ohr, Germany. On 8 April 1945 division engineers constructed a pontoon bridge across the Weser Elbe Canal, west of, Harsum allowing Company "A" to continue its drive northeast to Braunschweig.

== Elbe River ==
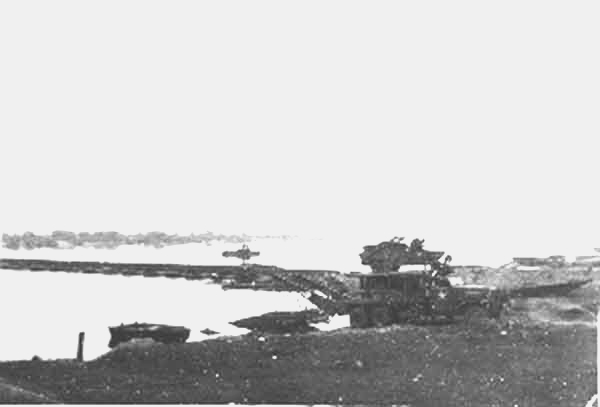
Elbe river bridge, abandoned at Westerhüsen after enemy shellings

The engineers ferried two battalions across the Elbe river before starting the construction of the floating bridge at – Westerhusen. In the night spanning 12 to 13 April 1945 a bridge across the river was made. Starting at 11pm Companies D and E, 17th Armored Engineer Battalion built the bridge. It was a very dark night making it difficult even with the use two search lights. In the dark the bridge quickly came together. As day light came, engineers put smoke pots, for smoke screen, on both sides of the bridge to hide the construction completions from the enemy. But, at 6am enemy shells destroyed five bridge pontoon floats, work was stopped. By 7am work started again to complete and repair the bridge. By 2pm the bridge was also most complete with 25 feet to complete. But so much enemy artillery fire was raining in the engineers were ordered to abandon the bridge and load up their trucks and pull out, to prevent further damage. PFC William Horne with the 82nd Engineer Combat Regiment helping with the bridge was killed during construction. The unit moved to Grunewalde were a ferry would move them across. 17th engineers help in the ferry operations with their DUKWs. On 17 April the 17th Armored Engineered Battalion completed constructed of a bridge across the Elbe River at Magdeburg. The construction team came against enemy fire and once a Luftwaffe attack. 25 April 1945 is known as Elbe Day as the West and East armies connected near the bridge here.

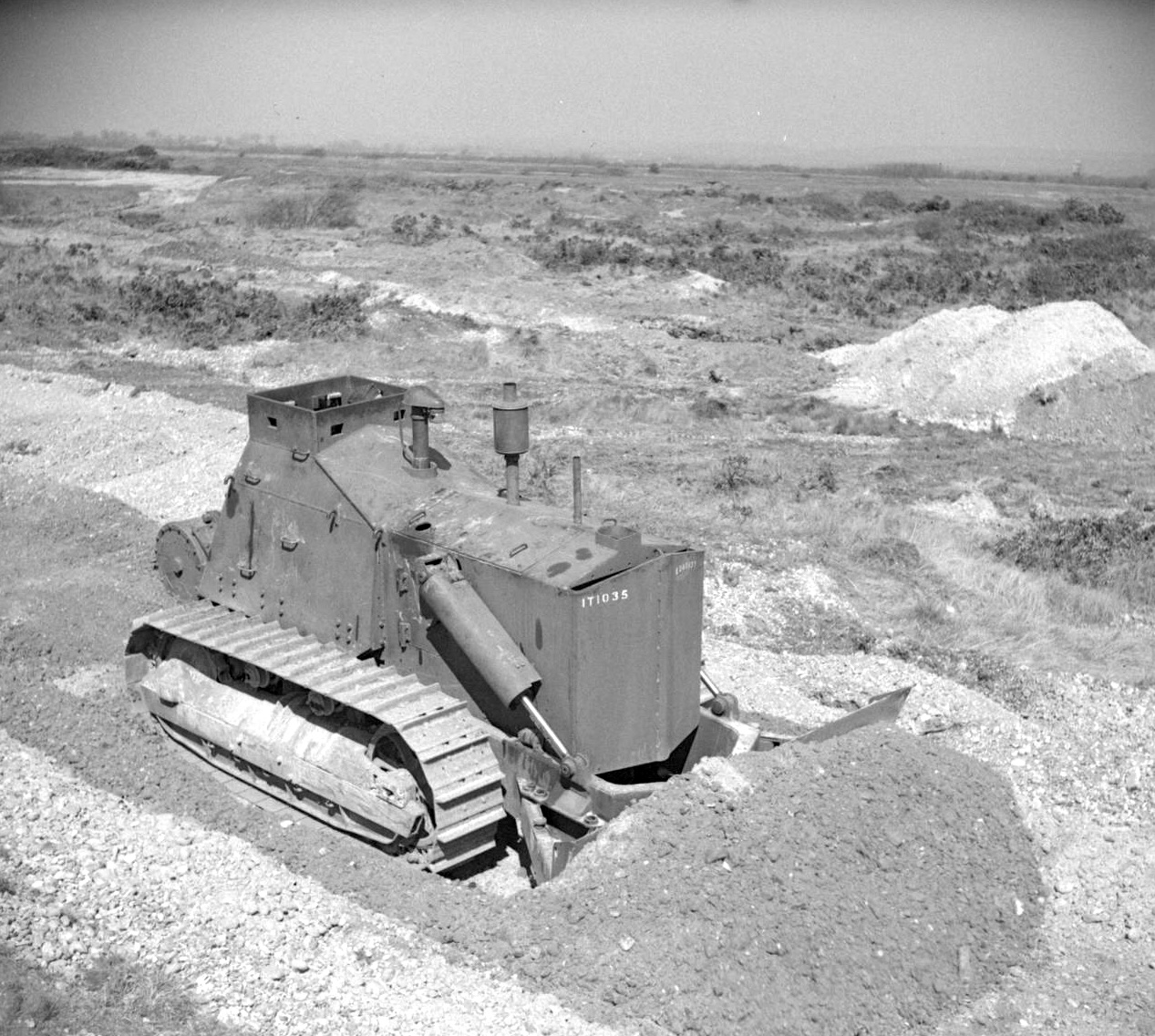
Caterpillar D7 armored bulldozer

=== Back to the US ===
On 21 January 1946 the battalion was shipped from Calais, France to Ft. Hood, Texas arriving 12 February 1946.

2nd Armored Division patch

== Cold War ==
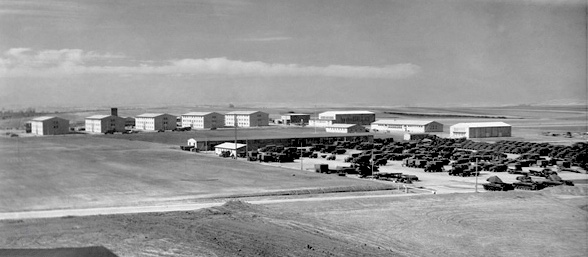
1953 Anderson Barracks, Dexheim, Germany, 1954

After World War II the 17th Armored Engineer Battalion was based in Dexheim, Germany. From 1953 to 1954 Anderson Barracks was home of the 17th Armored Engineers. The Engineer battalion's mission was to assist the mobility of armored units of the Second Armored Division. Their mission was to help delay or defeat any Soviet invasions through the Fulda Gap. An annual training event was installing a floating bridge across the Rhine River, like the Battalion did in World War II. In 1967 parts of 17th were assigned to the 198th Light Infantry Brigade. In 1978, Delta Company, 17th Engineers was stationed at Lucius D. Clay Kaserne in Garlstedt, Germany as part of 2nd Armored Division (Forward). During the Cold War, D Company's role was to prepare for heavy armored combat against the Warsaw Pact in defense of NATO being ready to move in the event of a Soviet threat to NATO. The 17th and its division practiced during exercises like REFORGER (Return of Forces to Germany) from 1967 to 1988. Some training took place at the National Training Center at Fort Irwin, California.

== Panama ==
The 17th took part in Operation Just Cause the United States invasion of Panama on 20 December 1989. Helping with landing and dock operation in the short, but very complex operation.

== Gulf War ==
The 17th served in Saudi Arabia and Kuwait. In the fall of 1990 17th deployed to Saudi Arabia as part of Operation Desert Storm to support heavy armor divisions in the Defense of Saudi Arabia and later the liberation of Kuwait. 17th took part in Battle of Norfolk, with tank battles and ground infantry fighting, the 17th was in operation much like World War II, with mine removal and other support roles.

The battalion was inactivated in 1995.

== Insignia ==
- Battalion's insignia is the shield and motto of the coat of arms.
- Motto "We pave the way"
- Coat of Arms: Shield: Gules, the back of a dexter mailed fist proper, grasping a portable ramp argent.
- Crest: On a wreath of the colors (argent and gules) an embattled tower azure issuant from a mound of snow proper supporting a lion rampant or, holding in dexter forepaw an acorn of the last, slipped and leaved vert, surmounting and extending above the tower and in base the upper part of two spears saltirewise, shafts of the second, heads vert and tied at the center of the like. The shield is red for Engineers. The mailed fist is indicative of the power and aggressive-ness of the organization while the portable ramp indicates one of its functions. World War II service during which it was awarded the Presidential Unit Citation is indicated by the blue embattled tower in the color of the citation streamer and signifies repeated attacks against fortified towns. The white mound refers to the heavy snow and icy conditions encountered during the Ardennes-Alsace campaign. The gold rampant lion is from the coat of arms of Belgium while the acorn with leaves alludes to the great forests of the Ardennes and to the oak, an emblem of courage. The colors green and red commemorate the Belgian fourragere awarded the unit and the two spears allude to service with the 2d Armored Division which spearheaded the drive into Belgium and pierced the enemy defenses in the Ardennes. The arrowheads on the spears also refer to assault landings in North Africa and Sicily during World War II.

== Decorations and honors ==
- Presidential Unit Citation (Army), Streamer embroidered "Ardennes". (17th Armd Engr Bn cited for period 22 Dec 1944 – 17 Jan 1945; WDGO 2, 1946)
- Presidential Unit Citation (Army), Streamer embroidered "Rhine to Elbe River" (Co E 17th Armd Engr Bn cited for period 11 Mar – 13 Apr 1945; WDGO 100, 1945)
- Belgian Fourragere 1940 (17th Armd Engr Bn cited; DAGO 43, 1950)
- Cited in the Order of the Day of the Belgian Army for action in BELGIUM (17th Armd Engr Bn cited for action on 2 September 1944; DAGO 43, 1950)
- Cited in the Order of the Day of the Belgian Army for action in the ARDENNES (17th Armd Engr Bn cited for period 21–28 Dec 1944; DAGO 43, 1950)
- Navy Unit Commendation, Streamer embroidered SAUDI ARABIA-KUWAIT (Co A 17th Engr Bn cited for period 14 Aug 1990 – 16 Apr 1991; Ltr, Sec Navy, 24 October 1992)
- Distinguished Unit Citation: Company E, 17th Armd. Engr. Bn.: 11 March 1945 to 13 April 1945 during the advance of the 2nd Armored Division from the Rhine to the Elbe River in Germany.
- Distinguished Unit Citation: 17th Armd. Engr. Bn. : 22 December 1944 to 17 January 1945 for operations during the German Ardennes breakthrough.
- President Truman's Diary on 16 July 1945 reviewed the Second Armored Division in Berlin and tied a citation award to the guidon flag of Company E, 17th Armored Engineer Battalion.

== See also ==
- 82nd armored reconnaissance battalion
- Mine plow
- Mine roller
- Hobart's Funnies
- Allied technological cooperation during World War II
- History of the tank
- Tanks in World War I
- Tanks in World War II
