= Operation Grenade =

1945 American operation into Germany

Operation Grenade (Battle of the Roer)
- Part of the Western Allied invasion of Germany in the Western Front of the European theatre of World War II
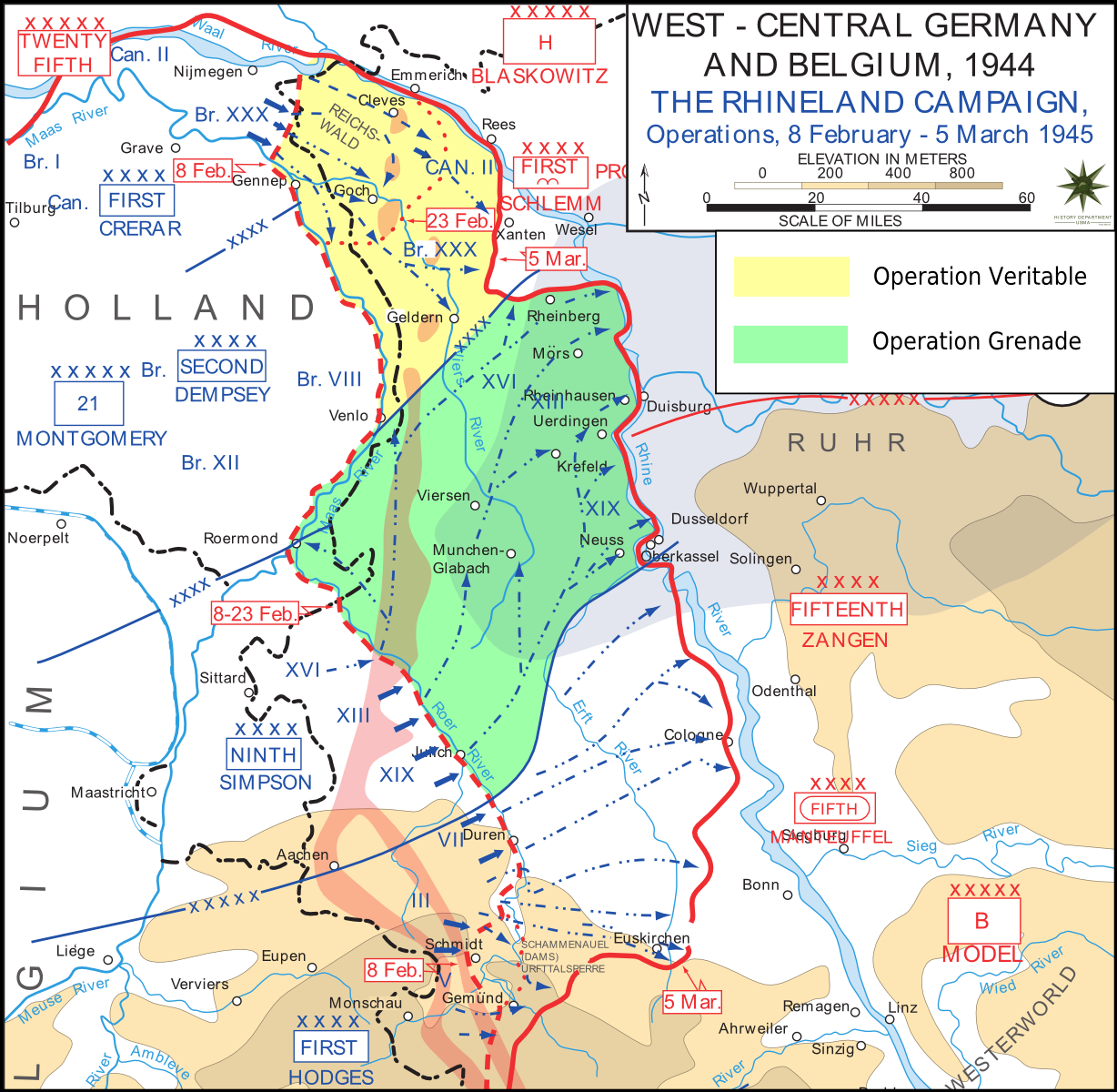
- Operations Veritable and Blockbuster (yellow) and Grenade (green)
Date	23 February – 10 March 1945 (2 weeks and 1 day)
Location	Rhineland, Germany
Result	American victory

Belligerents
United States	Germany

Commanders and leaders
(United States) William H. Simpson	(Germany) Gustav-Adolf von Zangen (Germany) Alfred Schlemm

Strength
380,000; 1,400 tanks 2,070 guns 375 aircraft	54,000; 180 tanks

Casualties and losses
1,330 killed Total: 7,478	29,739 captured 16,000 other casualties (US estimate); Total: 45,739 (Note: Ninth Army captured 29,739 prisoners during the operation, and estimated to have inflicted 16,000 other casualties on the German army. In conjunction with Operation Veritable/Blockbuster, the combined allied effort inflicted approximately 90,000 casualties on the German army.)

During World War II, Operation Grenade was the crossing of the Roer river between Roermond and Düren by the U.S. Ninth Army, commanded by Lieutenant General William Hood Simpson, in February 1945, which marked the beginning of the Allied invasion of Germany.

On 9 February, the U.S. Ninth Army—operating under Field Marshal Bernard Montgomery's Anglo-Canadian 21st Army Group since the Battle of the Bulge—was to cross the Roer and link up with the Canadian First Army, under Lieutenant-General Harry Crerar, coming from the Nijmegen area of the Netherlands in Operation Veritable, which had started at 05:00 on 8 February. However, once the Canadians had advanced, the Germans opened the sluice gates of upstream Roer dams. This stopped the Americans from crossing as planned. It had been anticipated that the Germans would try to do this, and that General Omar Bradley's U.S. 12th Army Group could capture them in time to stop the flooding.

During the two weeks that the river was flooded, Hitler would not allow Generalfeldmarschall Gerd von Rundstedt to withdraw behind the Rhine, arguing that it would only delay the inevitable fight. He ordered him to fight where his forces stood. Those forces comprised the 15th Army, commanded by Gustav-Adolf von Zangen, and the 1st Parachute Army, commanded by Alfred Schlemm.

The Ninth Army was finally able to cross the river on 23 February. By then, other Allied forces were also close to the Rhine. German forces west of the Rhine during operations Veritable, Blockbuster and Grenade lost 90,000 men, of which more than 50,000 became prisoners of war (POW). Allied casualties amounted to some 23,000 men.

== Notes ==
Footnotes

Citations
