= Clark L. Ruffner =

United States Army general

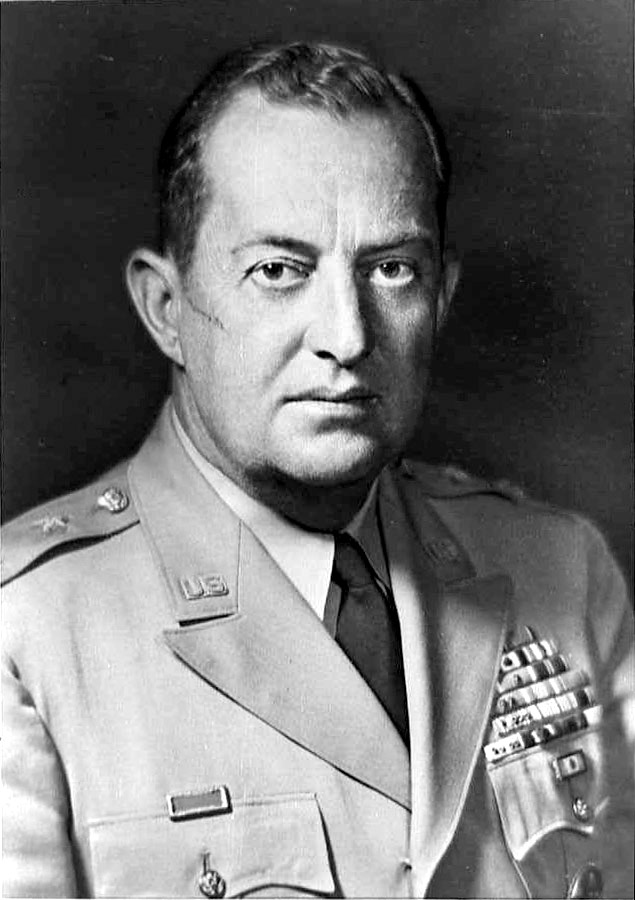
- General Clark Louis Ruffner
- Born: 12 January 1903; Buffalo, New York, U.S.
- Died: 26 July 1982 (aged 79); Washington, D.C., U.S.
- Military career
- Allegiance: United States
- Branch: United States Army
- Service years: 1924–1962
- Rank: General
- Commands: Third United States Army; 2nd Armored Division; United States Army, Pacific; 2nd Infantry Division
- Conflicts: World War II; Korean War
- Awards: Distinguished Service Cross; Army Distinguished Service Medal (3); Silver Star (2); Legion of Merit (2); Bronze Star Medal

General Clark Louis Ruffner (12 January 1903 – 26 July 1982) was a senior officer in the United States Army who served in World War II and the Korean War.

== Military career ==
Ruffner was born 12 January 1903, in Buffalo, New York, and graduated from the Virginia Military Institute in 1924. Most of his early career was spent in various cavalry units until his appointment as Assistant Professor of Military Science and Tactics at Norwich University in Vermont from 1937 to 1940.

During World War II, Ruffner first served as Assistant Chief of Staff and then Deputy Chief of Staff for VII Corps from 1942 to 1943. He then went on to become Assistant Deputy Chief of Staff for the Hawaiian Department in 1943. From there, Ruffner became Deputy Chief of Staff, Central Pacific Area, from 1943 to 1944, and Chief of Staff for the United States Army, Pacific from 1944 until after the end of the war.

At the outbreak of the Korean War, Ruffner was Chief of Staff, X Corps, but soon took command of the 2nd Infantry Division in 1951 from where he was a key commander in the conflict. Ruffner's unit occupied the center of the UN line during the Battle of the Soyang River during the Chinese spring offensive. After his command, Ruffner spent the remainder of the war in Washington working on International Security Affairs in the office of the Defense Secretary.

In 1954, Ruffner moved back into the Pacific theater where he successively served as Deputy Commanding General and Commanding General for the United States Army, Pacific. From there he became Commanding General, 2nd Armored Division, from 1954 to 1956, and after a tour in Germany, Commanding General of the Third United States Army from 1958 to 1960. During this period, he received promotions to lieutenant general and general. Ruffner concluded his career as United States Representative to NATO, and retired in 1962. He died on 26 July 1982.

== Awards and decorations ==
Ruffner's military decorations and service medals include the Distinguished Service Cross, Army Distinguished Service Medal with two Oak Leaf Clusters, Silver Star with Oak Leaf Cluster, the Legion of Merit with Oak Leaf Cluster, the Bronze Star Medal, the Air Medal with two Oak Leaf Clusters, the Army Commendation Medal, the World War II Victory Medal, the Korean Service Medal with four bronze service stars, and the United Nations Service Medal.

Military offices
Preceded by Robert B. McClure	Commanding General 2nd Infantry Division; January–August 1951	Succeeded by Thomas F. Deshazo
Preceded by Leander L. Doan	Commanding General 2nd Armored Division; 1955–1956	Succeeded by Conrad S. Babcock Jr.
Preceded by Thomas F. Hickey	Commanding General Third United States Army; 1958–1960	Succeeded by Robert Sink
