= 2nd Armored Division (United States) =

Inactive US Army formation

- 2nd AD Shoulder Sleeve Insignia
- Active: 15 July 1940–15 January 1996
- Country: United States
- Branch: United States Army
- Type: Armor
- Role: Armored warfare
- Size: Division
- Nickname: "Hell on Wheels"
- Engagements: World War II; Algeria-French Morocco; Sicily; Normandy; Northern France; Rhineland; Ardennes-Alsace; Central Europe; Gulf War; Defense of Saudi Arabia; Liberation of Kuwait
- Decorations: Belgian fourragère

Commanders
- Notable commanders: Charles L. Scott; George S. Patton; George Patton IV; Ernest N. Harmon; Edward H. Brooks; Oliver W. Dillard

Insignia
- Flag
NATO Map Symbol
2

The 2nd Armored Division ("Hell on Wheels") was an armored division of the United States Army. The division played important roles during World War II in the invasions of Germany, North Africa, and Sicily and in the liberation of France, Belgium, and the Netherlands. During the Cold War, the division was primarily based at Fort Hood, Texas, and had a reinforced brigade forward stationed in Garlstedt, West Germany. After participation in the Persian Gulf War, the division was deactivated in 1995.

== History ==
=== World War II ===
==== Initial organization ====
The 2nd Armored Division was formed at Fort Benning, Georgia on 15 July 1940. Under the first system of American armored division organization

It was originally commanded by Major General Charles L. Scott, with Colonel George S. Patton Jr. in charge of training. Scott was promoted to command the I Armored Corps in November of that year, which put Patton, now a brigadier general, in command of the division. The division, which in February 1942 passed over to the command of Major General Willis D. Crittenberger, served with the First, Seventh, and Ninth Armies throughout the war.

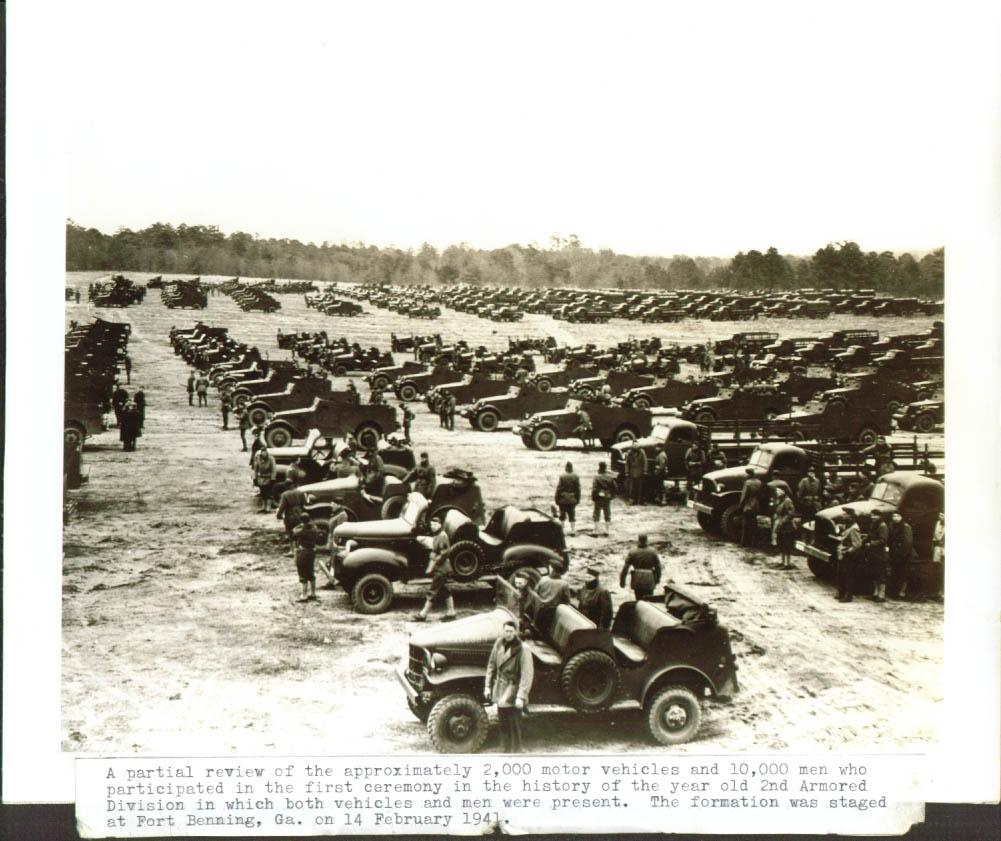
2nd Armored's first ceremony combining 10,000 men and 2,000 vehicles; Valentine's Day 1941.

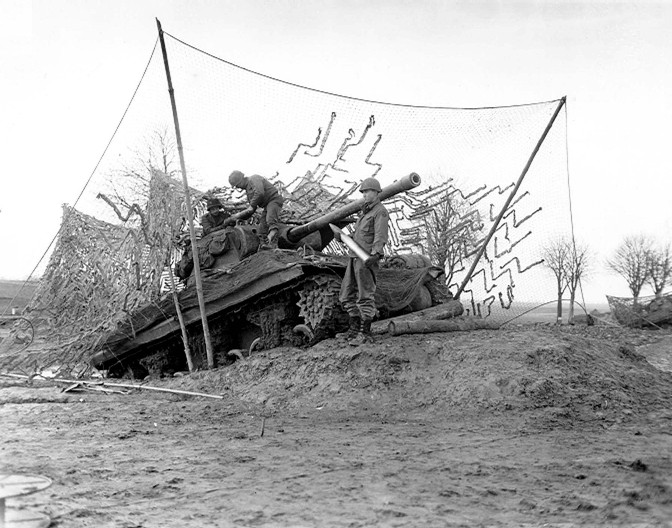
Company C, 702d Tank Destroyer Battalion, 2nd Armored Division, tank destroyer on dug-in ramp has plenty of elevation to hurl shells at long range enemy targets across the Roer River. L-r: Sgt. George E. Schelz, Pvt. Earl F. Van Horne, and Pfc. Samuel R. Marcum. December 16, 1944.

In January 1942, the 2nd Armored Division was reorganized under the "heavy" armored division table of organization, which it maintained for the remainder of the war. The most major changes involved the disbandment of the 2nd Armored Brigade, the loss of the 68th Armored Regiment to the newly-formed 6th Armored Division, the reduction of the 14th Field Artillery Regiment to a battalion, and the addition of the 92nd Armored Field Artillery Battalion. Each of the division's two armored regiments contained two medium tank battalions and one light tank battalion, with each battalion consisting of three companies (18 tank companies total). Along with the 3rd Armored Division, it retained its organization throughout World War II–the 14 other U.S. armored divisions were reorganized as "light" armored divisions, having three tank battalions, each consisting of three medium tank companies and one light tank company (12 tank companies total). Both types had an infantry component of three mechanized battalions, although the heavy divisions maintained an "armored infantry regiment" organization.

The core units of the division were the 41st Armored Infantry Regiment, the 66th Armored Regiment, the 67th Armored Regiment, the 17th Armored Engineer Battalion, the 82nd Armored Reconnaissance Battalion, and the 142nd Armored Signal Company. The 82nd Armored Reconnaissance Battalion was known as the "eyes and ears" of the 2nd Armored Division.

The 2nd Armored Division had three artillery battalions: (the 14th, 78th, and 92nd). The division also had support units, including the 2nd Ordnance Maintenance Battalion, 2nd Supply Battalion, the 48th Armored Medical Battalion, and a band and military police platoon. The military police and band were tasked with headquarters defense of base operations under the banner of the 502d Adjutant General Company (502d AG).

==== Combat chronicle ====
===== North Africa =====
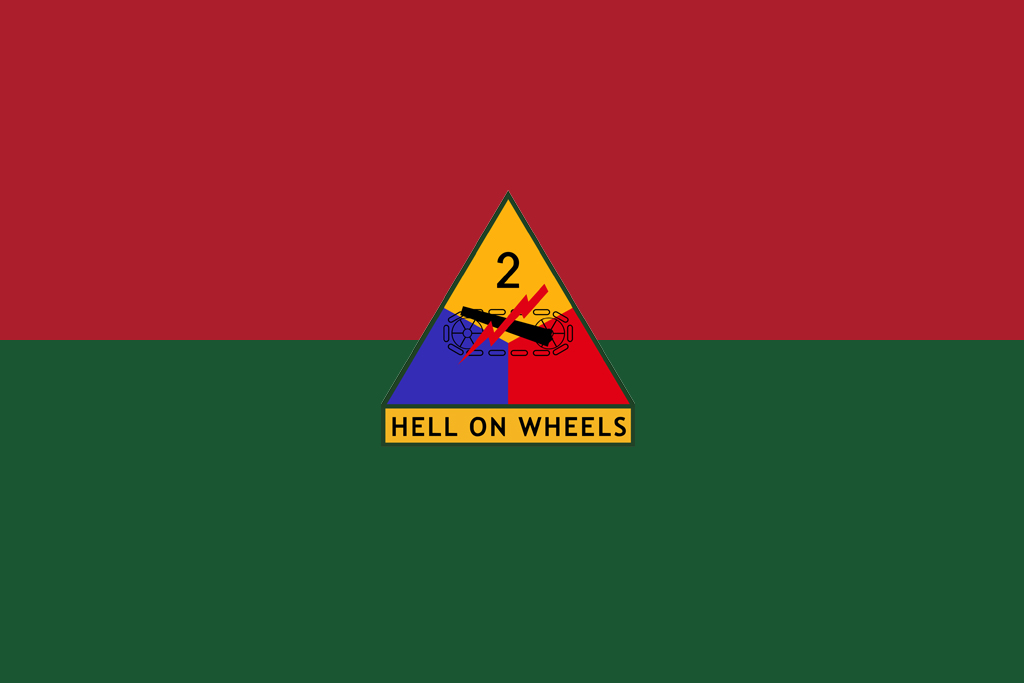
WWII 2nd Armored Division Flag

Elements of the division were among the first U.S. military to engage in offensive ground combat operations in the European and Mediterranean theater during World War II. The 2nd Armored Division, now commanded by Major General Ernest N. Harmon, served in North Africa along with the 1st Armored Division. They were part of the Western Task Force of Operation Torch, which landed at Casablanca in French Morocco on 8 November 1942. The remainder of Torch's American component were the 1st, 3rd, 9th and 34th Infantry Divisions. However, the 2nd Armored Division did not see much action in North Africa and instead remained in French North Africa on garrison and training duties. In April 1943 Major General Harmon relinquished command of the division to Major General Hugh Joseph Gaffey. Training in amphibious operations began in preparation for an amphibious landing at Sicily.

===== Sicily =====
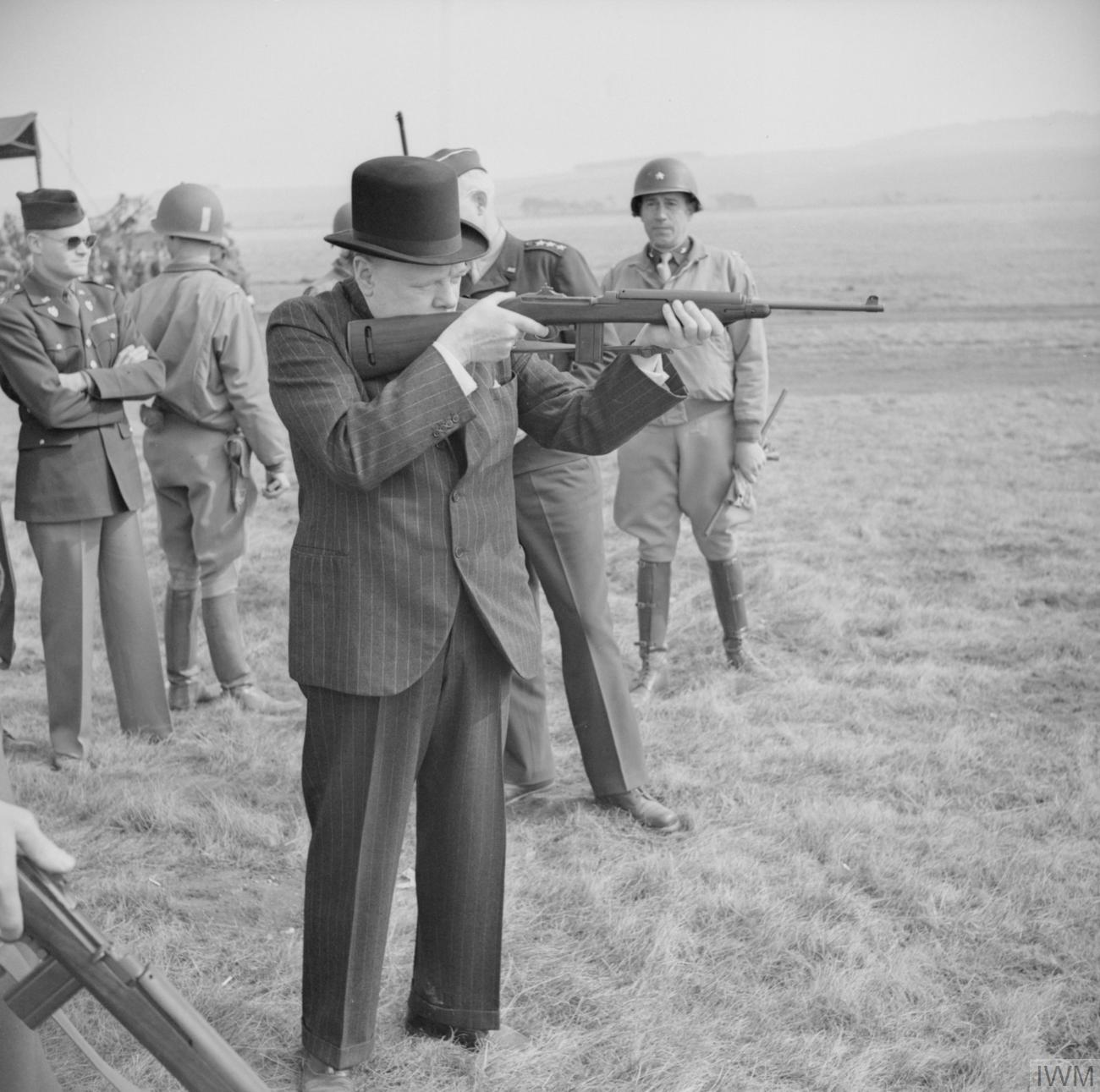
British Prime Minister Winston Churchill fires an American .30 carbine during a visit to the U.S. 2nd Armored Division on Salisbury Plain, March 23, 1944.

As the reserve force of the Western Task Force of Operation Husky, codename for the Allied invasion of Sicily, the division landed on 10 July 1943, in support of the 1st Infantry Division at the Battle of Gela. Afterwards, the division next went into action in the second landing at Licata, Sicily on 21 July following the 3rd Infantry Division's better-known earlier landing on 10 July. The 2nd Armored, operating closely with paratroopers of the 82nd Airborne Division, then fought through to the Sicilian capital of Palermo. Along the way the 2nd Armored Division captured thousands of Italian prisoners of war (POWs). The fighting in Sicily came to an end on 17 August, with the 2nd Armored Division having sustained relatively light casualties in the brief campaign, where it had gained its first Medal of Honor of World War II, belonging to Sergeant Gerry H. Kisters. During the campaign the division came under the command of the U.S. Seventh Army, under Lieutenant General George S. Patton, who had been a former commander of the division.

Soon afterwards the 2nd Armored Division was sent to England, in preparation for the Allied invasion of Normandy, and remained there until June 1944. In April the division received a new commander, Major General Edward H. Brooks, a decorated veteran of World War I, replacing Major General Gaffey.

===== Normandy =====
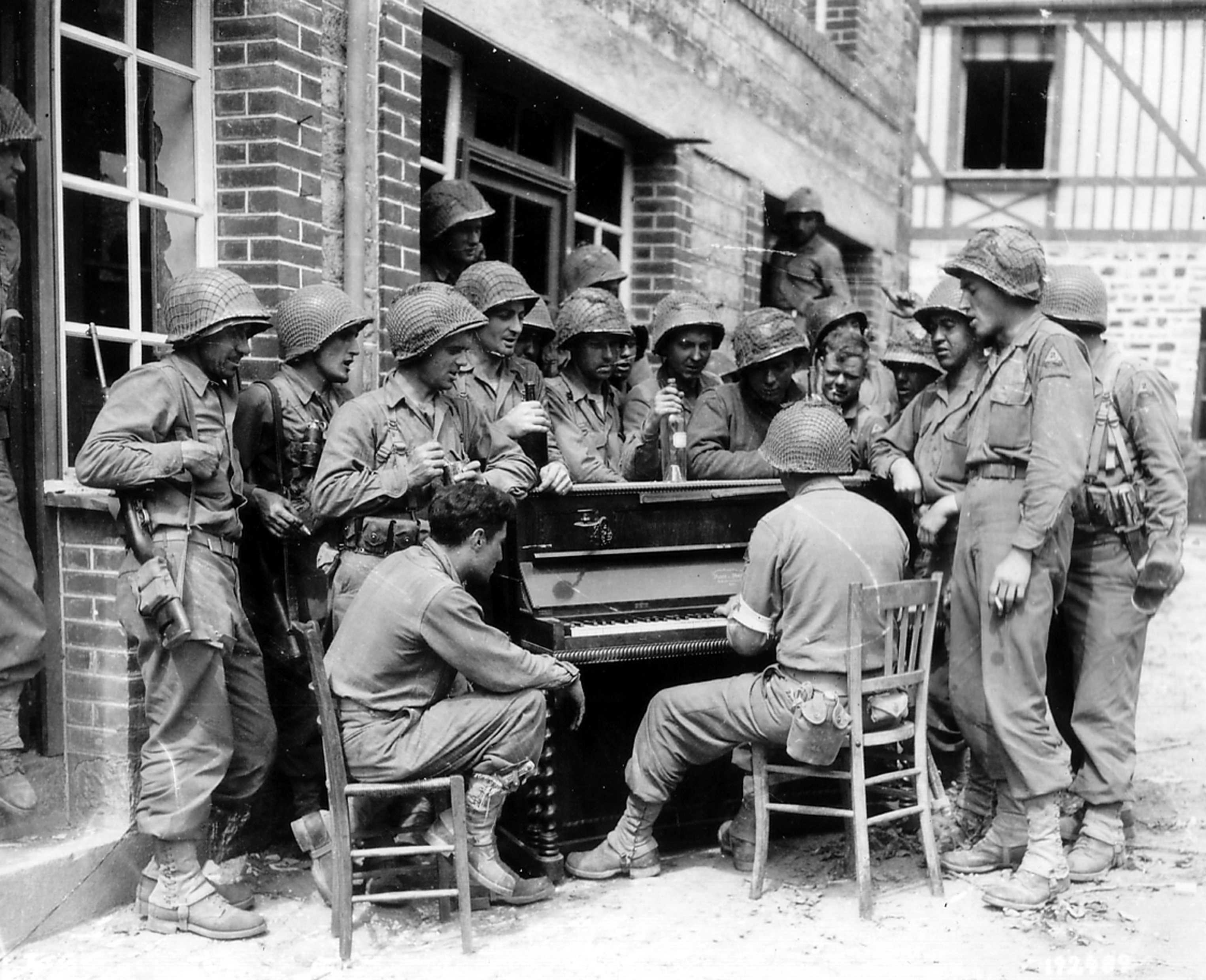
Soldiers of the division in Barenton, Normandy.

The 2nd Armored Division landed at Omaha Beach in Normandy on 9 June 1944, three days after the initial Normandy landings, and operated in the Cotentin Peninsula, later forming the right flank of the Operation Cobra assault. The division encircled the 2nd SS Panzer Division Das Reich and the 17th SS Panzergrenadier Division Götz von Berlichingen around Roncey, and destroyed most of their armored equipment. At La Chapelle, a 2nd SS Panzer column was attacked at point blank range by 2nd Armored Division artillery. Over the course of two hours American artillery fired over 700 rounds into the column. The Germans suffered the loss of 50 dead, 60 wounded and 197 taken prisoner; material losses included over 260 German combat vehicles destroyed. Beyond the town, the 2nd Armored engaged another column, killing 1,150 German soldiers and destroying an additional 96 armored combat vehicles and trucks. The U.S. 2nd Armored Division destroyed 64 German tanks and 538 other German combat vehicles during Operation Cobra, while itself losing 49 tanks. The 2nd Armored Division inflicted over 7,370 casualties on the Germans, while suffering 914 casualties of their own. This is approximately an eightfold disparity. The 2nd Armored blunted Operation Lüttich, the German counterattack on Avranches, then raced across France with the rest of the First Army, reaching the Albert Canal in Belgium on 8 September. On 18 September it crossed the German border near Sittard and took up defensive positions near Geilenkirchen. On 3 October, the division, now commanded again by Major General Harmon, launched an attack on the Siegfried Line from Marienberg (Übach-Palenberg), broke through, crossed the Wurm River, seized the town of Puffendorf on 16 November, and Barmen on 28 November.

==== Division organization ====
===== Initial division organization =====
When the 2nd Armored Division was formed on 15 July 1940 it was composed of the following units:

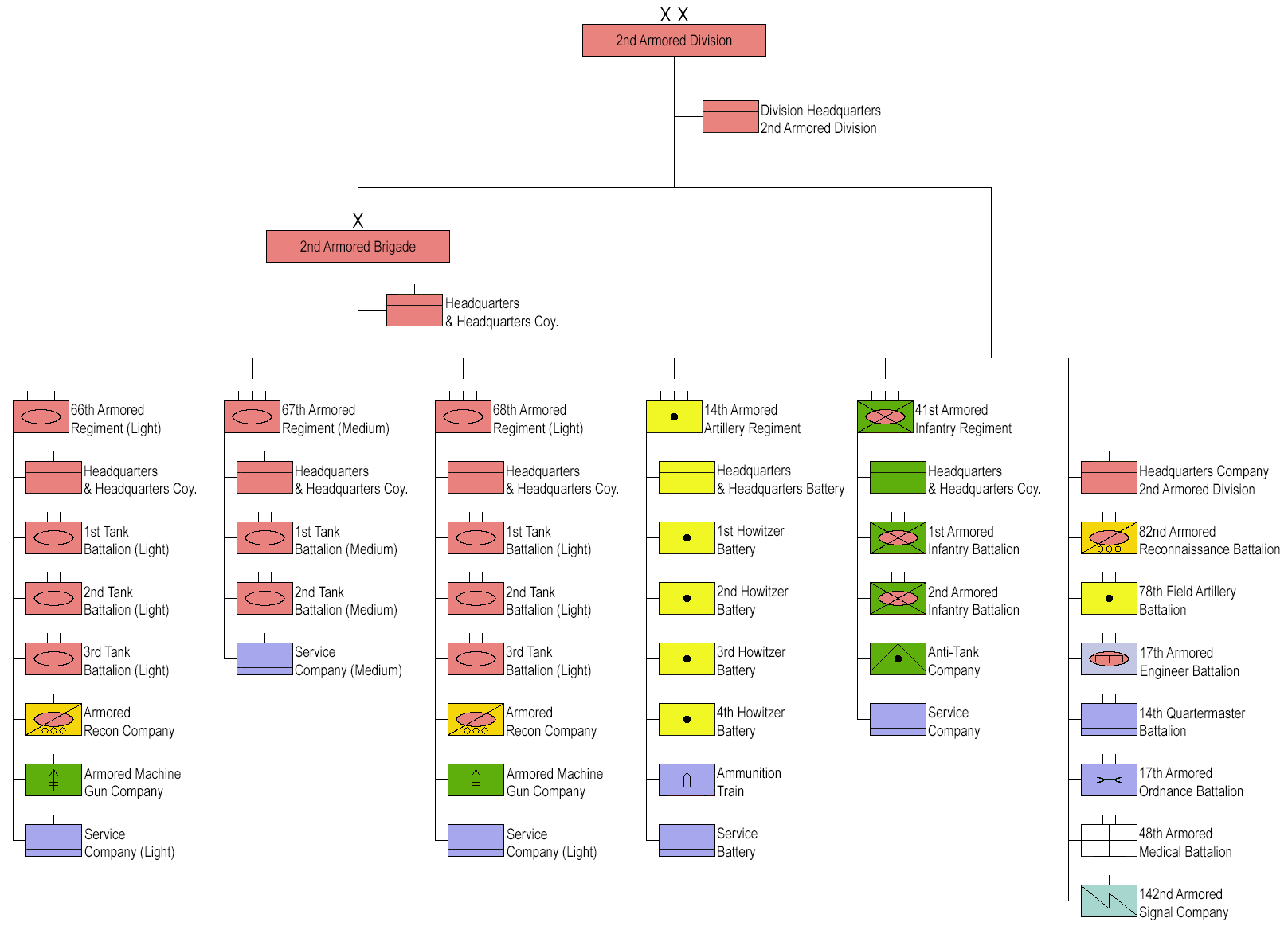
2nd Armored Division initial organization (click to enlarge)

- 2nd Armored Division
  - Division Headquarters
  - Headquarters Company, 2nd Armored Division
  - 142nd Armored Signal Company
  - 2nd Armored Brigade (formed by reorganizing the 7th Provisional Tank Brigade)
    - Headquarters and Headquarters Company
    - 66th Armored Regiment (Light)
      - Headquarters and Headquarters Company
      - Armored Reconnaissance Company (M3 scout cars)
      - Armored Machine Gun Company (M2 half-track cars and M1919 .30-caliber machine guns)
      - Service Company (Light)
      - 3× Tank battalions (Light)
        - each battalion consists of: 1× Headquarters and Headquarters Platoon, 3× tank companies with M3 Stuart light tanks
    - 67th Armored Regiment (Medium)
      - Headquarters and Headquarters Company
      - Service Company (Medium)
      - 2× Tank battalions (Medium)
        - each battalion consists of: 1× Headquarters and Headquarters Platoon, 3× tank companies with M3 Lee medium tanks
    - 68th Armored Regiment (Light) (transferred in February 1942 to the 6th Armored Division)
      - same organization as 66th Armored Regiment (Light)
    - 14th Armored Field Artillery Regiment
      - Headquarters and Headquarters Battery
        - 4× Field artillery batteries (24× M2 105mm towed howitzers)
      - Ammunition Train
      - Service Battery
  - 41st Armored Infantry Regiment
    - Headquarters and Headquarters Company
    - 2× Armored infantry battalions
      - each battalion consists of: 1× Headquarters and Headquarters Platoon, 3× Rifle companies on M3 half-tracks, and 1× Heavy Weapons Company with M3 37mm Anti-Tank guns and M4 mortar carriers
    - Anti-Tank Company (M3 37mm Anti-Tank guns)
    - Service Company
  - 82nd Armored Reconnaissance Battalion
    - Headquarters and Headquarters Detachment
    - 2× Armored reconnaissance companies (M3 scout cars)
    - Light Tank Company (M3 Stuart light tanks)
    - Armored Reconnaissance Rifle Company (M3 half-tracks)
  - 78th Field Artillery Battalion
    - Headquarters and Headquarters Battery
    - 3× Field artillery batteries (12× M2 105mm towed howitzers)
    - Anti-Tank Gun Battery (8× M1897 75mm anti-tank guns)
    - Service Battery
  - 17th Armored Engineer Battalion
    - Headquarters and Headquarters Company
    - 3× Armored engineer companies
    - Bridge Company
  - 14th Quartermaster Battalion
    - Headquarters and Headquarters Company
    - Quartermaster Truck Company
    - Light Maintenance Quartermaster Company
  - 17th Armored Ordnance Battalion
    - Headquarters and Headquarters Company
    - 2× Ordnance companies
  - 48th Armored Medical Battalion
    - Headquarters and Headquarters Detachment
    - Medical Collecting Company
    - Medical Clearing Company
    - Division Surgeon's Office

===== Heavy armored division =====
The Louisiana Maneuvers in August and September 1941 had a profound impact on the organization of US armored division. The exercises exposed that the existing armored divisions were too heavy in armor and too light in infantry and artillery. Additionally the divisions lacked the resources to organize combat teams, while the armored brigade complicated the command channel. It was also found that the division's service elements needed greater control. As a result the Table of Organization of armored divisions was radically reorganized: the armored brigade headquarter was eliminated. The number of armored regiments was reduced from three to two, and the two remaining armored regiments were reorganized to consist of one light and two medium tank battalions each. Three self-propelled 105mm howitzer battalions replaced the armored artillery regiment and field artillery battalion, and control of the artillery passed to an artillery section in the division headquarters. The armored infantry regiment was reorganized to consist of three battalions of three companies each. The engineer battalion added a fourth engineer company. Each divisions also formed two combat command headquarters, which did not have assigned units, but allowed the division commander to assemble combat teams as required. The quartermaster battalion was replaced by a supply battalion, while the ordnance battalion added a third ordnance maintenance company. For better control of the division's service elements, division trains were added. To support the division headquarters company a service company was formed, which provided transportation and supplies, and included the division's military police platoon.

After the reorganization the 2nd Armored Division was composed of the following units:

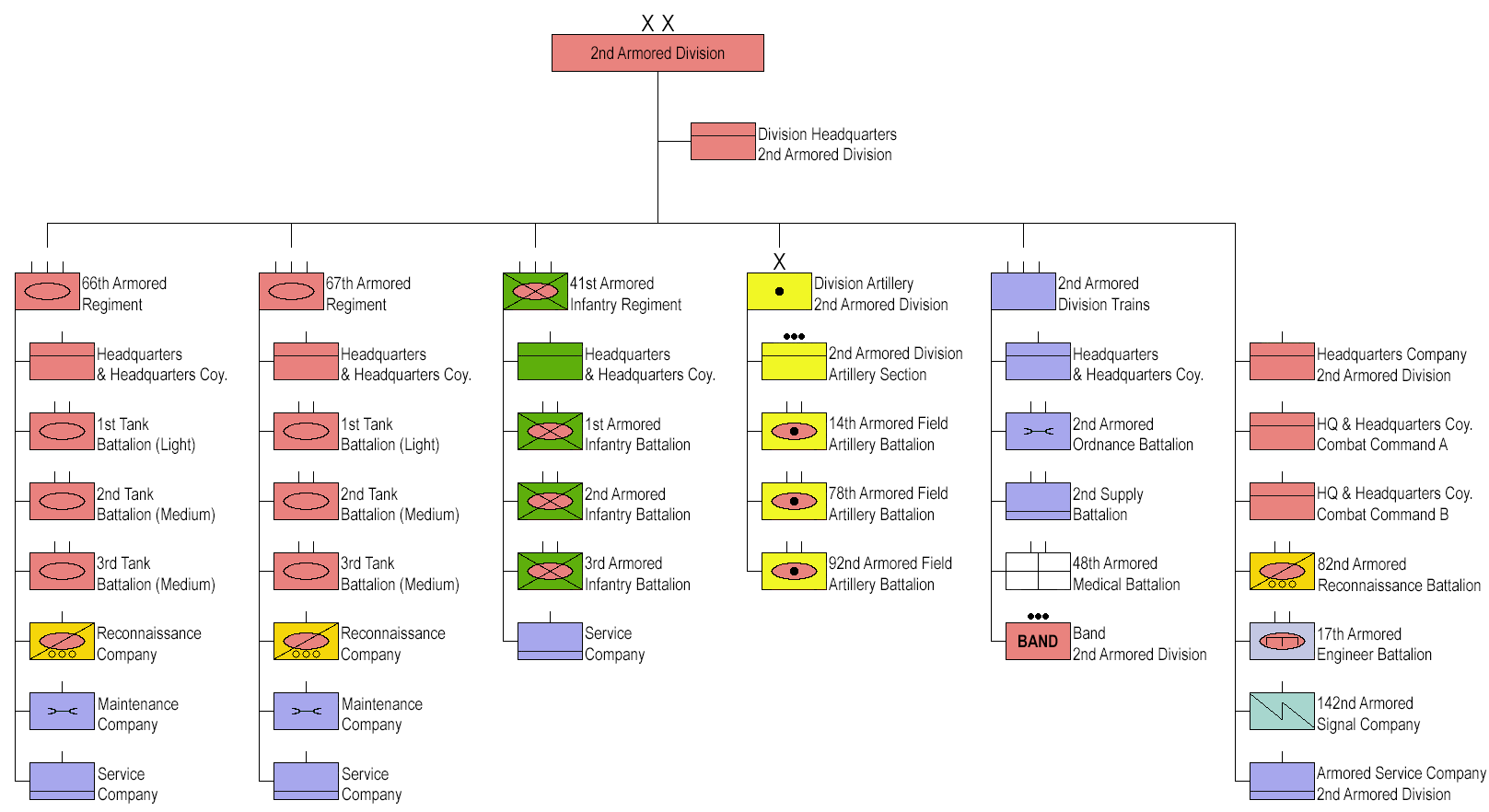
2nd Armored Division organization as a heavy armored division (click to enlarge)

- 2nd Armored Division
  - Division Headquarters
  - Headquarters Company, 2nd Armored Division
  - Headquarters and Headquarters Company, Combat Command A
  - Headquarters and Headquarters Company, Combat Command B
  - 142nd Armored Signal Company
  - Armored Service Company (includes the division's Military Police Platoon)
  - 66th Armored Regiment
    - Headquarters and Headquarters Company
    - Reconnaissance Company (initially M3 scout cars and T30 HMC self propelled guns, which were replaced by M8 Greyhound armored cars and M8 Scott self propelled guns)
    - Maintenance Company
    - Service Company
    - 1st Tank Battalion (Light) (In June 1944 the battalion transferred its A and B companies to the 2nd and 3rd Tank Battalion and received F Company, respectively I Company, in return)
      - Headquarters and Headquarters Company
      - 3× Light Tank companies (A, B, C) (M3/M5 Stuart light tanks)
    - 2nd Tank Battalion (Medium) (In June 1944 the battalion exchanged F Company with the 1st Tank Battalion's A Company)
      - Headquarters and Headquarters Company
      - 3× Medium Tank companies (D, E, F) (M4 Sherman tanks)
    - 3rd Tank Battalion (Medium)
      - Headquarters and Headquarters Company (In June 1944 the battalion exchanged I Company with the 1st Tank Battalion's B Company)
      - 3× Medium Tank companies (G, H, I) (M4 Sherman tanks)
  - 67th Armored Regiment
    - same organization as 66th Armored Regiment
  - 41st Armored Infantry Regiment
    - Headquarters and Headquarters Company
    - 3× Armored infantry battalions
      - each battalion consists of: 1× Headquarters and Headquarters Company, 3× Rifle companies on M3 half-tracks
    - Service Company
  - 82nd Armored Reconnaissance Battalion
    - Headquarters and Headquarters Company
    - 3× Reconnaissance companies (initially M3 scout cars and then M8 Greyhound armored cars)
    - Light Tank Company (M3/M5 Stuart or M24 Chaffee light tanks)
  - 17th Armored Engineer Battalion
    - Headquarters and Headquarters Company
    - 4× Armored engineer companies
    - Bridge Company
  - 2nd Armored Division Artillery
    - 2nd Armored Division Artillery Section
    - 14th Armored Field Artillery Battalion
      - Headquarters and Headquarters Battery
      - 3× Field artillery batteries (M7 Priest self propelled howitzers)
      - Service Battery
    - 78th Armored Field Artillery Battalion
      - same organization as 14th Armored Field Artillery Battalion
    - 92nd Armored Field Artillery Battalion
      - same organization as 14th Armored Field Artillery Battalion
  - 2nd Armored Division Trains
    - Headquarters and Headquarters Company
    - 2nd Armored Ordnance Battalion
      - Headquarters and Headquarters Company
      - 3× Maintenance companies
    - 2nd Supply Battalion
      - Headquarters and Headquarters Company
      - 2× Truck companies
    - 48th Armored Medical Battalion
      - Headquarters and Headquarters Company
      - 3× Medical companies
    - 2nd Armored Division Band

The 702nd Tank Destroyer Battalion had originally been formed around a nucleus of personnel from the 2nd Armored Division in December 1941, and was persistently associated with the division throughout its training in the United States and combat in the European Theater.

==== Casualties ====
- Total battle casualties: 5,864
- Killed in action: 981
- Wounded in action: 4,557
- Missing in action: 60
- Prisoners of war: 266
- Days of battle: 443

==== Awards ====
Members of the division received 9,369 individual awards, including two Medals of Honor, twenty-three Distinguished Service Crosses, and 2,302 Silver Stars as well as nearly 6,000 Purple Hearts; among those receiving the Silver Star were Edward H. Brooks, Hugh Armagio, Stan Aniol, Staff Sergeant John J. Henry, William L. Giblin, Neil J. Garrison, Morton Eustis, son of William Corcoran Eustis, and Sgt Kenneth J. White. The division was twice cited by the Belgian government and division soldiers for the next 50 years wore the fourragere of the Belgian Croix de Guerre.

=== Cold War and Vietnam ===
After a brief period of occupation duty, the division returned from overseas to Fort Hood, Texas, in 1946 to retrain and rebuild. The 2nd Armored Division returned to West Germany to serve as part of Seventh Army, VII Corps from 1951 to 1957. In late 1957, it rotated back to the United States as part of Operation Gyroscope, being replaced in Germany by the 4th Armored Division. Once back in the US, it returned to III Corps, Fort Hood.

While stationed in Germany in 1952 with the Seventh Army, the 2nd Armored Division was based at Stuttgart-Vaihingen under the command of General Williston Palmer. During this time, Palmer enlisted the help of a young Corporal Samuel Adler from within his ranks to organize the Seventh Army Symphony Orchestra. During the course of the next decade, the orchestra remained based with the 2nd Armored Division and the Seventh Army while supporting America's cultural diplomacy initiatives throughout Europe during the height of the Cold War.

The 1-50 Infantry; 2-1 Cavalry; 1-40 Field Artillery; and 1-92 Field Artillery fought in the war in Vietnam, but not the division as a whole. The division included the "Fort Hood Three", a group of three enlisted men who refused to ship out when ordered to deploy to Vietnam in 1966.

The majority of the division would spend much of the next 35 years based at Fort Hood, and the division remained on active service during the Cold War. Its primary mission was to prepare to conduct heavy armored combat against Warsaw Pact forces in defense of NATO. The division formed a key component of the U.S. military's plan to move "ten divisions in ten days" to Europe in the event of a Soviet threat to NATO. The division practiced this task numerous times during Exercise Reforger from 1967 to 1988. To build and maintain combat skills, the division's maneuver brigades deployed almost annually to the National Training Center to face an opposing force modeling Soviet military weapons and tactics.

However, with the end of the Cold War, the U.S. Army began to be reduced in size. The 2nd Armored Division was scheduled for inactivation in the spring of 1990.

==== 2nd Armored Division (Forward) ====
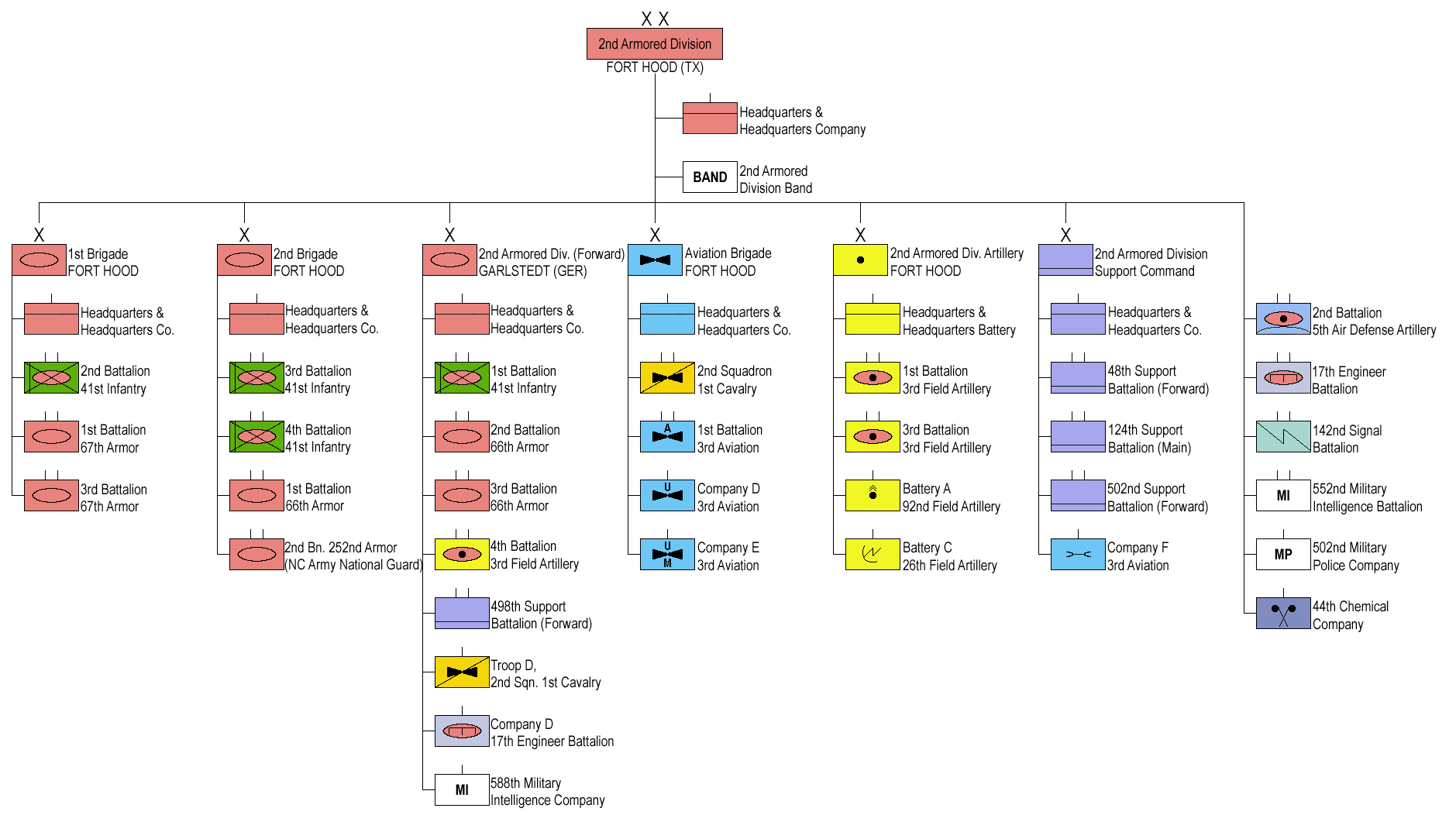
2nd Armored Division structure 1989 (click to enlarge)

In 1975, the 2nd Armored Division's third brigade forward deployed to West Germany and was assigned to NATO's Northern Army Group (NORTHAG). The brigade received additional aviation, engineer, military intelligence, medical, and logistics support units and was additionally designated as the 2nd Armored Division (Forward). In case of conflict with the Warsaw Pact, the brigade was to either secure airfields and staging areas for the deployment of III Corps from the United States, or to deploy to the Inner German Border and establish a blocking position as part of a NATO combat force.

From 1975 through 1978, the brigade headquarters was located at Grafenwöhr, along with the rotating armor and artillery battalions and the supporting engineer and cavalry units. Two rotating infantry battalions were based at Hohenfels and Vilseck. The six-month rotations continued until 1978, immediately before the move to permanent facilities in northern Germany.

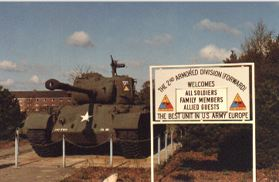
Lucius D. Clay Kaserne was home to the U.S. Army's 2nd Armored Division (Forward) from 1978 to 1993. The Kaserne was located 24 kilometers north of the city of Bremen.

2nd Armored Division (Forward) was based at a new military facility near the village of Garlstedt just north of the city of Bremen. The facilities cost nearly $140 million to construct, half of which was paid for by the Federal Republic of Germany. The brigade had approximately 3,500 soldiers and another approximately 2,500 family dependents and civilian employees. The German government constructed family housing in the nearby city of Osterholz-Scharmbeck. In addition to troop barracks, motor pools, an indoor firing range, repair and logistics facilities, and a local training area, facilities at Garlstedt included a troop medical clinic, post exchange, library, movie theater, and a combined officer/non-commissioned officer/enlisted club. The division's soldiers and family members received radio and TV broadcasts from The American Forces Network (AFN) – Europe via the AFN Bremerhaven affiliate station located in the nearby port city of Bremerhaven. In April 1986, a Burger King restaurant opened on the kaserne.

The brigade was officially designated as 2nd Armored Division (Forward) during ceremonies at Grafenwöhr, FRG on 25 July 1978. The Garlstedt facilities were officially turned over to the United States by the German government in October. At that time the Garlstedt kaserne (camp) was named after General Lucius D. Clay, revered by the German people for his role as the American military commander following World War II. His son, a retired U.S. Army major general, attended the ceremony.

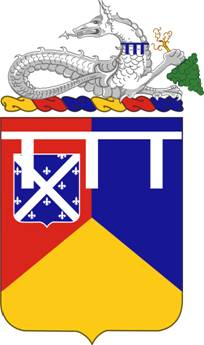
66th Armor regimental coat of arms. The 2nd and 3rd battalions of the regiment provided the heavy armor punch of the 2nd Armored Division (Forward).

The brigadier general in charge of 2nd Armored Division (Forward) had a unique command. In addition to command of the heavy brigade, he also functioned as the Commander, III Corps (Forward), headquartered in Maastricht, Netherlands, and as commander of all US Army forces in Northern Germany, including the military communities of Garlstedt and Bremerhaven. In the event of the deployment of III Corps and/or the 2nd Armored Division from the United States, the division commander would revert to his job as assistant division commander for operations of 2nd Armored Division. This contingency was practised during REFORGER exercises in 1980 and 1987. Brigadier generals who held the position included James E. Armstrong, George R. Stotser, Thomas H. Tait, William F. Streeter, John C. Heldstab, and Jerry R. Rutherford.

The brigade's subordinate combat units initially consisted of the 3d Battalion, 41st Infantry; 2d Battalion, 50th Infantry; 2d Battalion, 66th Armor (Iron Knights); 1st Battalion, 14th Field Artillery, and Troop C, 2d Squadron, 1st Cavalry. In October 1983, as part of the army's regimental alignment program, 2–50 Infantry was reflagged as 4–41 Infantry and 1–14 Field Artillery as 4-3 Field Artillery. Other brigade subordinate units eventually included the 498th Support Battalion, Company D, 17th Engineer Battalion, and the 588th Military Intelligence Company. The brigade also had a military police platoon and an aviation detachment. In 1986, under the army's COHORT unit manning and retention plan, 3–41st Infantry returned to Fort Hood and was replaced by 1–41st Infantry. In 1987, 4–41st Infantry returned to Fort Hood, Texas and was replaced by 3–66th Armor (Burt's Knights, named for Captain James M. Burt who was awarded the Medal of Honor as a company commander in the 66th Armored Regiment in the Battle of Aachen during World War II). Now an armor-heavy brigade, 2nd Armored Division (Forward) fielded 116 M-1A1 Abrams tanks and nearly 70 M2/3 Bradley Fighting Vehicles.

The brigade initially deployed to Germany with the M60A1 Patton tank and the M113 armored personnel carrier. 4–3rd Field Artillery had the M109 155 mm self-propelled howitzer. In 1984, 2–66th AR transitioned to the M1/IPM1/M1A1 Abrams main battle tank. In 1985, 3–41st IN and 4–41st IN transitioned to the M2 Bradley Fighting Vehicle; also, C/2-1 Cavalry was replaced by an air cavalry troop, D/2-1 Cavalry, armed with AH-1S Cobra attack helicopters.

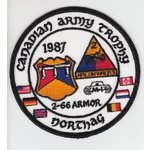
2–66th Armor's 1987 Canadian Army Trophy uniform patch.

The division participated in numerous major NATO training exercises, including "Trutzige Sachsen" (1985), "Crossed Swords" (1986) and the "Return of Forces to Germany" (REFORGER) (1980 and 1987). Division subordinate units used the NATO gunnery and maneuver ranges at the Bergen-Hohne Training Area for gunnery and maneuver training and each year the division as a whole deployed south to Grafenwöhr and Hohenfels (both in Bavaria) training areas for annual crew and unit gunnery and maneuver qualification. 2nd Armored Division (Forward) developed a reputation for excellence during these deployments, particularly in tank crew gunnery.

Tank companies from 2–66th, and later 3–66th, Armor competed in the bi-annual NATO tank gunnery competition, the Canadian Army Trophy (CAT), as part of the NORTHAG team. C Company, 2–66th first contested for the trophy in 1983. And while a West German tank platoon won the competition that year at Bergen Hohne, 2–66th surprised the competition by performing well with its old M60A1 tanks, which used optical rangefinder technology from the World War II era. This showed the value of local course knowledge over pure technology. C Company, 2–66th contested for the trophy again in 1985, and D Company, 2–66th was part of the NORTHAG team in 1987. In 1989 C Company, 3–66th Armor won the competition outright. Participation in "CAT" was a source of great pride among the tank crews of 2AD (FWD).

The division had a formal partnership with Panzergrenadierbrigade 32, a Federal Republic of Germany Bundeswehr mechanized infantry brigade headquartered in nearby Schwanewede. The division also had informal relationships with Dutch, Belgian, and British NORTHAG forces, often conducting joint training activities at Bergen Hohne.

=== Gulf War ===
The invasion of Kuwait by Saddam Hussein in August 1990 caught the division in the midst of the post-Cold War drawdown of the U.S. Army. Secretary of Defense Richard Cheney had begun force reductions which meant the 2nd Brigade was in the middle of inactivating. Thus the 2nd Brigade could not be deployed as a whole. A unit of the 2nd Brigade, Battery "A", 92nd Field Artillery Regiment, was attached to the 10th Marine Regiment, and others were attached to the Division's 1st Brigade ("Tiger Brigade"). The 1st Brigade during the Saudi Arabia deployment was known almost exclusively as the Tiger Brigade. The Tiger Brigade, commanded by Colonel John B. Sylvester, deployed to Saudi Arabia and provided heavy armor support for United States Marine Corps forces in their attack into Kuwait. The Tiger Brigade included two battalions of the 67th Armor Regiment, the 1st and 3rd, TF 3-41 Infantry and 1st Battalion, 3rd Field Artillery Regiment. It served at the Battle of Kuwait International Airport. The Tiger Brigade was credited with destroying or capturing 181 enemy tanks, 148 APCs, 40 artillery pieces, 27 AA emplacements, and 263 Iraqi soldiers killed with an additional 4,051 captured.

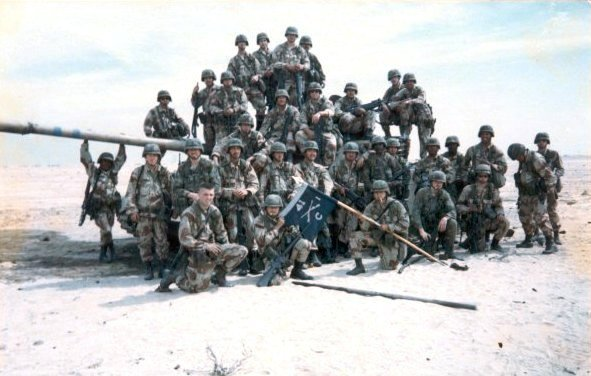
Soldiers of 2nd Platoon, Company C, 1st Battalion, 41st Infantry Regiment, 2nd Armored Division (FWD) pose with a captured Iraqi tank during the 1st Gulf War, February 1991.

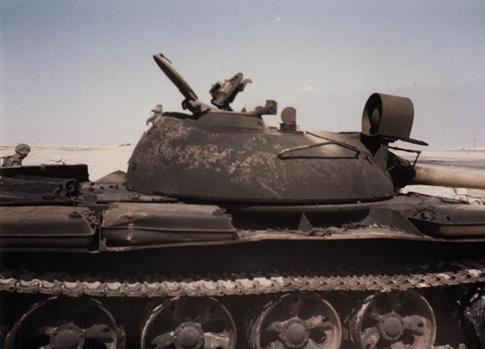
An Iraqi Republican Guard tank destroyed by the 2nd Armored Division's Task Force 1-41 Infantry during the 1st Gulf War, February 1991.

The division's 3rd brigade, based in Germany, deployed to Saudi Arabia in the fall of 1990 and acted as the third maneuver brigade of the 1st Infantry Division from Fort Riley, KS. One of the brigade's battalion task forces, Task Force 1-41 Infantry, was the first coalition force to breach the Saudi Arabian border on 15 February 1991, and conduct ground combat operations in Iraq engaging in direct and indirect fire fights with the enemy on 17 February 1991. It was involved in a six-hour battle to clear Iraq's initial defensive positions. Initially it was tasked with performing counter reconnaissance and reconnaissance missions against Iraqi reconnaissance units. The brigade served at the Battle of 73 Easting with the 1st Infantry Division (Mechanized) along with the 2nd Armored Cavalry Regiment. They were responsible for destroying the Iraqi 18th Mechanized and 9th Armored Brigades of the Republican Guard Tawakalna Mechanized Infantry Division and the Iraqi 26th Infantry Division. They played a key role in the destruction of the 12th Armored Division destroying no less than 80 combat vehicles. The brigade destroyed 60 Iraqi tanks and 35 infantry vehicles along the IPSA pipeline. This is known as the Battle of Norfolk. The division's 4-3 FA battalion played a large role in the destruction of 50 enemy tanks, 139 APCs, 30 air defense systems, 152 artillery pieces, 27 missile launchers, 108 mortars, and 548 wheeled vehicles, 61 trench lines and bunker positions, 92 dug in and open infantry targets, and 34 logistical sites during combat operations. Before the end of combat operations the 2nd Armored Division(Forward) would engage a total of 11 Iraqi divisions. By dawn of the third day of the ground campaign, the 2nd Armored Division (Forward) had a hand in the destruction of four Iraqi tank and mechanized brigades and two divisions. Between the cease-fire and the official end of the war in April 1991, 2nd Armored Division (Forward) took part in security operations to ensure peace in Kuwait. The division then redeployed to Saudi Arabia, where some of its soldiers established and ran three refugee camps near Raffia, Saudi Arabia. Division relief workers processed over 22,000 Iraqi refugees between 15 April and 10 May. After turning the camps over to the Saudi Arabian government, the unit redeployed to Germany.

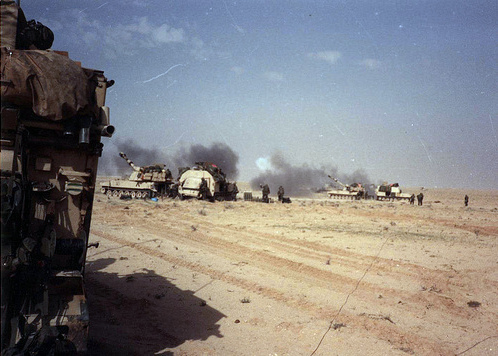
4th Battalion of the 3rd Field Artillery Regiment, 2nd Armored Division (FWD) conducts artillery strikes on Iraqi positions during the 1st Gulf War. 4-3 FA was the primary fire support battalion for Task Force 1–41 Infantry during the 1st Gulf War, February 1991.

The division's attack helicopter battalion, 1st Battalion, 3rd Aviation Regiment, deployed from Fort Hood to Saudi Arabia in fall 1990 attached to and with support from the 1st Cavalry Division (also based at Ft. Hood). The battalion was equipped with McDonnell Douglas AH-64 Apache attack helicopters. The battalion participated in many air strikes along the border region during the air portion of the campaign. The unit provided covering missions when the ground forces advanced into Iraq. 1st Battalion, 3rd Aviation Regiment was pulled back into Saudi Arabia after the cease-fire, with two squads staging in Kuwait to provide refueling and rearming services for battalion aircraft if hostilities resumed. The unit returned to Fort Hood, Texas, in April 1991 and continued the inactivation that was interrupted when Iraq invaded Kuwait. The unit was inactivated on 16 September 1991, and the regimental flag transferred to sister unit 3rd Battalion, 3rd Aviation Regiment based in Germany. The unit was transferred as a whole to Fort Campbell, Kentucky, in August 1991 and became the 2nd Battalion of the 101st Aviation Regiment (part of the 101st Airborne Division).

=== Inactivation ===
After the Gulf War the division went through a series of inactivations and reflaggings. Due to the restructuring of the U.S. Army after the end of the Cold War, the division was ordered off the active duty rolls, ending more than 50 years of continuous service. On return to Fort Hood in 1991, the Tiger Brigade and 1st Battalion of the 3rd Aviation Regiment, all that remained of the U.S.-based division, were reflagged as the 3d Brigade, 1st Cavalry Division, and the 2d Battalion, 101st Aviation Regiment respectively. On 1 September 1991, 2nd Armored Division (Forward), in Germany, officially became 2nd Armored Division after main elements of 2nd Armored Division at Fort Hood inactivated. Over the summer and fall of 1992, 2nd Armored Division was inactivated. Lucius D. Clay Kaserne was turned back over to the German government and was later to become home of the German Army Logistics and Supply School (Logistikschule der Bundeswehr) as well as the seat of General der Nachschubtruppe.

In December 1992, the 5th Infantry Division (Mechanized) at Fort Polk, Louisiana, was reflagged as the 2nd Armored Division. In 1993, the unit moved to Fort Hood. In December 1995, the 2nd Armored Division was again reflagged, this time as the 4th Infantry Division (Mechanized), stationed at Fort Carson, CO. This formally ended the 2nd Armored Division's 55-year history. Several units historically associated with the 2nd Armored Division, including battalions from the 66th Armored Regiment at Fort Hood, TX, the 41st Infantry Regiment at Fort Carson, Colorado, the 1st Armored Division at Fort Bliss, Texas, and the 172nd Infantry Brigade at Grafenwöhr, Germany (inactivated 31 May 2013).

Lucius D. Clay's name was later reused for Wiesbaden Army Airfield.

Though it was inactivated, the division was identified as the fourth highest priority inactive division in the United States Army Center of Military History's lineage scheme due to its numerous accolades and long history. All of the division's flags and heraldic items were moved to the National Infantry Museum at Fort Benning, Georgia following its inactivation.

== Commanders ==
- Charles L. Scott July 1940 – November 1940
- George S. Patton Jr. November 1940 – January 1942
- Willis D. Crittenberger, January 1942 – July 1942
- Ernest N. Harmon July 1942 – 6 April 1943
- Allen F. Kingman April 1943 – 5 May 1943
- Hugh J. Gaffey 5 May 1943 – 17 March 1944
- Edward H. Brooks 17 March 1944 – 12 September 1944
- Ernest N. Harmon 12 September 1944 – 19 January 1945
- Isaac D. White 19 January 1945 – 8 June 1945
- John H. Collier 8 June 1945 – 4 September 1945
- John M. Devine 4 September 1945 – 24 March 1946
- John W. Leonard 24 March 1946 – October 1946
- Leland S. Hobbs October 1946 – August 1947
- James G. Christiansen September 1947 – 28 June 1949
- Albert C. Smith 28 June 1949 – 1 November 1950
- Williston B. Palmer Unknown – 24 November 1951
- Charles K. Gailey Jr. 24 November 1951 – 3 April 1952
- George W. Read Jr. 3 April 1952 – April 1953
- Leander L. Doan April 1953 – 20 January 1955
- Clark L. Ruffner 20 January 1955 – 5 April 1956
- Conrad S. Babcock Jr. 5 April 1956 – 1 June 1957
- Briard P. Johnson 1 June 1957 – 30 October 1958
- Earle G. Wheeler 30 October 1958 – 1 April 1960
- Edward G. Farrand 1 April 1960 – 1 July 1961
- William H. S. Wright 1 July 1961 – 13 February 1963
- Edwin H. Burba 13 February 1963 – August 1964
- George R. Mather September 1964 – July 1965
- John E. Kelly July 1965 – 3 July 1967
- Joseph A. McChristian 3 July 1967 – 22 July 1969
- Leonard C. Shea 22 July 1969 – 1 November 1969
- Wendell J. Coats 1 November 1969 – 3 August 1971
- George G. Cantlay Jr. 3 August 1971 – 16 July 1973
- Robert L. Fair 16 July 1973 – 5 August 1975
- George Patton IV 5 August 1975 – 3 November 1977
- Charles P. Graham 3 November 1977 – 6 February 1980
- Richard L. Prillaman 6 February 1980 – July 1982
- John W. Woodmansee July 1982 – 20 August 1984
- Richard Scholtes 20 August 1984 – 24 June 1986
- Roger J. Price 24 June 1986 – 24 June 1988
- Glynn Mallory 24 June 1988 – June 1990
- Philip H. Mallory July 1990 – April 1991
- Paul E. Blackwell April 1991 - May 1992
- Jared L. Bates November 1992 – 7 May 1994
- Robert S. Coffey 7 May 1994 – 15 December 1995

== Notable personnel ==
- Paul D. Phillips, former personnel officer and plans officer (G-3); former oldest living West Point graduate, retired as a Brigadier General.

== In popular culture ==
- Fury follows an -E8 Sherman tank & crew of the 66th Armor Regiment, operating in support of the 30th Infantry Division, inside Germany, in April, 1945.

== See also ==
- Rhino tank
- 17th Armored Engineer Battalion
