= John B. Sylvester =

United States Army general

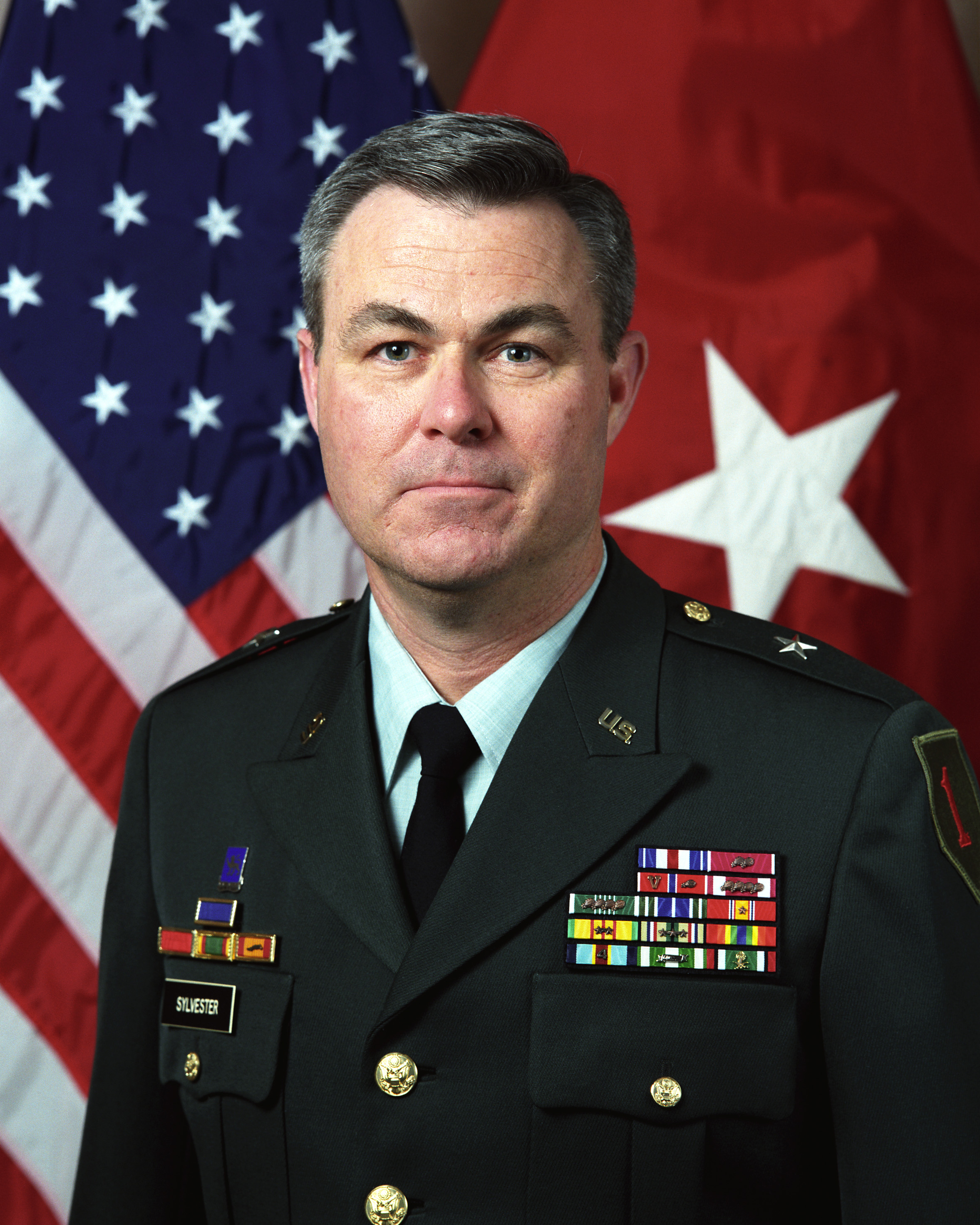
- Sylvester as a Brigadier General in 1994
- Born: May 25, 1946 (age 80); Columbia, South Carolina, U.S.
- Military career
- Allegiance: United States
- Branch: United States Army
- Service years: 1968–2004
- Rank: Lieutenant General
- Commands: Stabilisation Force in Bosnia and Herzegovina; 3rd Brigade, 1st Cavalry Division; 1st Brigade, 2nd Armored Division; 1st Battalion, 68th Armor Regiment
- Conflicts: Vietnam War; Yugoslav Wars; Gulf War
- Awards: Defense Distinguished Service Medal (3); Silver Star; Defense Superior Service Medal; Legion of Merit (3); Bronze Star Medal (2)

John B. Sylvester (born May 25, 1946) is a retired United States Army lieutenant general and decorated veteran of the Vietnam and Gulf Wars. He is best known for his command of the "Tiger" Brigade of the 2nd Armored Division OPCON to the 2nd Marine Division in the Gulf War, and his three tours of duty in the Balkans culminating as the commander of Stabilisation Force in Bosnia and Herzegovina (SFOR). Sylvester was awarded the Silver Star during Operation Desert Storm.

== Early life ==
A military brat, Sylvester was born in Columbia, South Carolina while his father was stationed at Fort Jackson. His father, Lieutenant Colonel George E. Sylvester, was a World War II veteran who served in the European front. The younger Sylvester spent his teenage years in Texas and attended Texas A&M University, graduating in 1967. He enlisted in the United States Army immediately afterward.

== Military career ==
Graduating from Officer Candidate School at Fort Benning in 1968, Sylvester was sent to Armor Officer Basic training at Fort Knox in Kentucky. He was then assigned to 2nd Battalion, 13th Armor. In 1970, he was assigned to 2nd Squadron, 11th Armored Cavalry Regiment in Vietnam. While serving on combat duty in Vietnam, Sylvester was awarded the Bronze Star Medal.

After Vietnam, Sylvester rose through the ranks, serving in numerous assignments both stateside and abroad. He earned an M.S. degree in Education and Counseling from Long Island University. In 1987, Sylvester graduated from the United States Army War College. In 1994, he served as Deputy Chief of Staff G2/G3 for the Allied Command Europe (ACE) Rapid Reaction Corps (ARRC) stationed at Rheindahlen, Germany, and later deployed with the Corps during NATO's first combat deployment to Bosnia. He later served as Director of Operations, Headquarters, Allied Forces Central Europe (today known as Joint Force Command Brunssum), based in the Netherlands.

In 1998, Sylvester was named as Assistant Chief of Staff for Operations for NATO forces in Bosnia-Herzegovina. He held two senior tours with the United States Army Training and Doctrine Command (TRADOC) at Fort Monroe, Virginia, as Deputy Chief of Staff for Training and later as the Chief of Staff. In 2001, he was promoted to the three-star rank as a consequence of being deployed on his third tour to the Balkans as the NATO force Commander, COMSFOR. His final tour on active duty was as the Chief of Staff of the United States European Command (EUCOM) in Stuttgart, Germany. He retired in August 2004 and was awarded the Defense Superior Service Medal during his retirement ceremony.

== Post-military career ==
Following his retirement Sylvester accepted a position with Military Professional Resources Inc. (MPRI), as a manager for several joint venture companies performing law enforcement work in support of the United States Department of State and the Department of Justice.

== Personal ==
Sylvester married Rebecca Jean "Becki" Schlamersdorf on August 29, 1969 in Tell City, Indiana.
