= 78th Field Artillery Regiment =

Artillery regiment of the United States Army

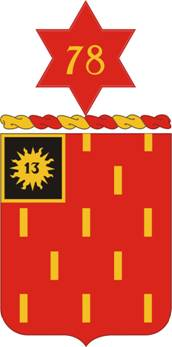
- Coat of arms
- Country: United States
- Branch: Army
- Type: Field artillery
- Mottos: SEMEL ET SIMUL (At Once and Together)

Insignia
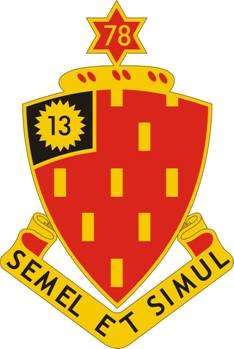
- Distinctive unit insignia

The 78th Field Artillery Regiment is a regiment of the Field Artillery Branch of the United States Army. Initially activated on 1 July 1916, the 78th Field Artillery Battalion did not see action in World War I, but would later be reactivated at the start of World War II and participate in the campaigns for Algeria-French Morocco, Sicily, Normandy, Northern France, Ardennes-Alsace, Central Europe, and the Rhineland with the 2nd Armored Division. The 78th Artillery Battalion's six batteries were reorganized into separate battalions in 1957, with the 1st Battalion, 78th Field Artillery being the only remaining active unit of the 78th Field Artillery.

The 1st Battalion, 78th Field Artillery is assigned to the 428th Field Artillery Brigade, and conducts Initial Entry Training in order to provide the Army with combat ready Field Artillery Soldiers. It conducts Advanced Individual Training for the 13-series (Field Artillery) Military Occupational Specialties (MOS) of 13B (Cannon Crewmember), 13F (Joint Fire Support Specialist), 13J (Fire Control Specialist), 13M (Multiple Launch Rocket System Crewmember), and 13R (Firefinder Radar Operator).

== History ==
=== Africa ===
On 8 November 1942, the 78th Armored Field Artillery Battalion, part of the 2d Armored Division, approached the coast of French Morocco. At dusk the 78th landed at Safi and began to move inland. The batteries of the 78th were all equipped with T-19s and 105 mm howitzers mounted on half-tracks. On 9 November, the 78th received word that a sizeable French force was marching from Marrakech to Safi. The landing team was ordered to intercept this force. That afternoon Battery C, 78th FA occupied a position to support a tank attack against the French and began to "rain steel" upon the enemy. The French, determined not to be pushed over, soon began firing on the 78th's position using World War I equipment. The antiquated French equipment did not present a legitimate threat, prompting General Harmon to disengage and march to his main objective -Casablanca. At dawn on 11 November, the armored column moved to the outskirts of Mazagan. Battery C, 78th FA and Battery B, 14th FA prepared to support an attack on the town soon after dawn. However, just before the attack, the French agreed to an armistice ending the "Battle of Mazagan". At Fedahla, due to heavy surf and equipment losses, the landing team which included Battery A, 78th FA, commanded by Captain George Bain, did not land until late in the evening on 9 November. On 10 November, the landing team started an envelopment that was soon called off upon receiving word of the armistice. At Port Lyautey only seven American tanks were on land when the French launched an attack with thirty-two Renault tanks in an effort to overrun the American beachhead. Captain C.W. Walter, commander Battery B, 78th FA, and Lieutenant Richard Moses, the forward observer, had landed with the seven American tanks. The two officers suddenly found themselves involved in serious action. The remainder of the landing team landed the next day. The team moved into position and kept the French at bay until the armistice.

=== Sicily ===
On 8 July 1943, the 78th sailed from the Bay of Tunis to Sicily as part of Task Force Kool. The invasion fleet had been subjected to continuous raids from the German Air Force. The 78th was directed to reinforce the artillery supporting the 18th Infantry and occupy positions 500 yards inland from the beach. The battalion maintained the same position on 9 July when it was ordered to support 1st Division units on the east flank. On 13 July, the 78th was ordered to support the 1st and 31-d Ranger Battalions in their attack on the small mountain town of Butera. The Rangers attacked at night on 13 July and, supported by artillery from the 78th, captured the town by early morning. The next day, the battalion displaced to new positions to support the consolidation of gains made by the Rangers. In the afternoon word came that the Germans had launched a serious counterattack against elements of the 1st Division about six miles to the north and effective antitank measures were needed. General Gaffey ordered the 78th to engage the German tanks by direct fire. However, the 1st Division had already repulsed the German counterattack. On 18 July, the 78th was ordered to reinforce the 14th FA, which was supporting Combat Command A in its mission to capture Palermo. However, upon reaching Palermo, there was no need to employ large armored units, and the 78th was no longer needed in Sicily.

=== Normandy ===
On 11 July 1944, the 78th Armored Field Artillery Battalion landed on the beaches of Normandy. The 78th was placed under the command of Combat Command B, Brigadier General I.D. White. The next several weeks were devoted to the reconnaissance of possible routes to launch counterattacks, fighting off German air attacks, and defending against enemy artillery. On 1 July, the 78th teamed with the 2d Armored Division to relieve the 7th British Armored Division near Caumont. The Germans frequently counterattacked the 2d Armored Division, subjecting it to continuous artillery fire. The 75 played a large role in repulsing these counterattacks. Under heavy artillery shelling, the 78th returned fire without hesitation. On 17 July, the 2d Armored Division was relieved by the 50th British Brigade and began preparing for the St. Lo breakthrough.

=== Operation Cobra ===
The 2d Armored Division was to attack alongside the 1st Infantry Division and 3d Armored Division. In order to support the advance of the leading elements and to counter the German attacks, the 78th positioned two batteries in a crossroad west of Notre Dame and one battery east of the town. The flexibility of the 78th allowed them to engage targets in opposite directions, providing maximum support to the mission. On 29 July, the Germans attacked with paratroopers and tanks, with the intent to break through to the south and occupy the crossroads. The 78th fired over 500 rounds to break up the German attack against the task force. At 0800 on 29 July, small arms fire grew in intensity north of Battery B and reports told of 200 men and 15 tanks advancing. The 4th Division fell under heavy fire and began to withdraw to Battery B's position. The 4th Division had lost all of its officers and was extremely disorganized. Battery B dropped their howitzers and picked up small arms and machine guns and took positions to block the advance of the Germans. Battery C positioned itself at the crossroad and covered the enemy with direct fire. The 78th, defending with every available weapon, finally halted the German advance. At this time a tank and infantry reserve arrived and drove the enemy forces north. The 78th occupied positions between Lengronne and St. Denis le Gast to support 1St Battalion, 41st Infantry and 1st Battalion, 67th Armored Regiment. After occupying its positions, the 78th continued to exchange fire with the enemy infantry in an attempt to break through to the south. Late in the evening, an enemy column of tanks and infantry infiltrated the area. Batteries A and B used M-7s to destroy the enemy vehicles until the enemy attacked the 78th 's area of operations. The infantry attacked the flanks of the Headquarters Battery and Battery B. Both batteries were drawn into a small arms battle with enemy infantry. Battery A and Battery C fired artillery upon the Germans, providing the support needed for the Headquarters Battery and Battery B to repulse the German attack. 96 German vehicles, including tanks and armored vehicles, were destroyed in the action, and 1,200 Germans were killed in the battle. The 78th suffered 50 dead and 60 wounded. For their actions, the 78th was awarded the Presidential Unit Citation and the French Croix de Guerre with Silver Star.

=== Siegfried Line ===
On 20 September, the 2d Armored Division was relieved by a reinforced cavalry unit and began preparations for the assault on the Siegfried Line. The plan for the breach of the Siegfried Line called for 30th Infantry Division to force a crossing of the Wurm River at two points, and create a penetration of the west wall. The 2d armored Division would then attack through the 30th Division and seize the towns of Linnich and Julich on the Roer River. On 2 October, the 30th Division attacked, meeting strong resistance. They were unable to create a breach before it was decided to send the 2d Armored Division. The 78th participated in the attack by reinforcing the fires of the 30th Division, then supported Combat Command B when the 2d Armored Division began its attack on 3 October. The 78th was the first artillery unit to cross the Siegfried Line. The German resistance was extremely effective and fanatical. The German artillery and tank fire created great confusion, slowing the advance of Combat Command B. During the fighting, the 78th fired continuously. It was the heaviest rate of fire for the battalion during its time in combat. The 2d Armored Division was directed to hold its position until 16 November, when it attacked in an attempt to cross the Roer River. The Germans counterattacked with large armored forces. The 78th helped to repel these counterattacks through its fires. On 28 November, the 2d Armored Division reached the west bank of the Roer, assuming a defensive role.

=== The Bulge ===
The 2d Armored Division was given orders to move south to help repel the Germans as they launched a counterattack toward the Meuse River and Liege. On 23 December, contact was established, and the division attacked, resulting in the destruction of the 2d Panzer Division. The division launched another attack to pinch off the western portion of the German salient. During these attacks, the 78th operated in support of Combat Command B. Numerous times the battalion organized small task forces to eliminate pockets of Germans hiding in the woods, In January the division went through extensive rehabilitation and maintenance in its preparation to march towards Berlin.

=== Berlin ===
On 23 February, the Ninth Army launched its attack on the Rhine. The 78th played a major role in helping the division cross the Rhine and eventually march to Berlin. On 1 April, the 78th, in support of Combat Command B, advanced north of the Ruhr Industrial District completing the closure of the gigantic Ruhr pocket by sinking up with the 3d armored Division. In late April, the division was relieved and assumed military government duties. The 2d Armored Division was selected to be the first unit to occupy the American zone of Berlin. The 2d armored Division returned to the United States to become the only armored division remaining in the U.S. Army.

== Lineage ==
Constituted on 1 July 1916 and organized 1 June 1917 at Fort Riley, Kansas, the 20th Cavalry was formed from elements of the 13th Cavalry. This lineage is enshrined in the unit crest as the numeral 13 in the blazing sun. In November 1917, the 20th Cavalry was converted, reorganized, and redesignated as 78th Field Artillery Regiment, part of the 6th Division. On the crest's wreath of red and gold, the 6-pointed star charged with the number 78 represents the 6th Infantry's insignia and its relationship to the Regiment. Battle participation in Europe was limited and the regiment was inactivated following World War I. The field of the unit crest is red for Artillery. The gold billets are from the coat of arms of Franche-Comté, the area where the 78th Field Artillery Regiment was located during World War I. Beneath the crest is a Scroll with the motto SEMEL ET SIMUL meaning "At Once and Together".

In 1940 the unit was activated as the 78th Field Artillery Battalion, part of the 2nd Armored Division. Re-designated the 78th Armored Field Artillery Battalion in 1942, the unit participated in the campaigns for Algeria-French Morocco, Sicily, Normandy, Northern France, Ardennes-Alsace, Central Europe, and the Rhineland.

In 1957 in Germany the regiment was relieved of assignment from the 2nd Armored Division and each of its six batteries were reorganized into separate battalions.

A Battery was re-designated as the 1st Battalion, 78th Artillery remained on assignment with the 2nd Armored Division.

B Battery was re-designated as the 2nd Battalion, 78th Artillery was assigned to the 4th Infantry Division and later the 1st Armored Division.

C Battery was re-designated as the 3rd Battalion, 78th Artillery was withdrawn from the Regular Army and allotted to the Army Reserve's 90th Infantry Division, later inactivated on 31 December 1965.

D Battery was re-designated as the 4th Battalion, 78th Artillery was withdrawn from the Regular Army and allotted to the Army Reserve's 102nd Infantry Division, later inactivated on 31 December 1965.

E Battery was re-designated as the 5th Battalion, 78th Artillery was assigned to 194th Armored Brigade, later inactivated on 18 May 1970.

F Battery was re-designated as the 6th Battalion, 78th Artillery was assigned to the 6th Infantry Division, later inactivated on 25 July 1968.

On 1 September 1971 the 78th Artillery was re-designated the 78th Field Artillery under the Combat Arms Regimental System.

In October 1988 1st and 2nd Battalion, 78th Field Artillery were inactivated, however shortly thereafter in February 1989 the 1st Battalion, 78th Field Artillery was reactivated and transferred to Fort Sill, Oklahoma under US Training and Doctrine Command where it continues in the conduct of Initial Entry Training

== Distinctive unit insignia ==
- Description
  - A Gold color metal and enamel device 1 13/32 inches (3.6 cm) in height consisting of the shield, crest and motto of the coat of arms.
- Symbolism
  - The background shield of the crest is red for artillery and the gold billets are from the coat of arms of the Duchy of Franche Compte, the area in France where the 78th Artillery was located during World War I. The numeral 13 in the Blazing Sun represents the 13th Cavalry, the original unit in the battalion lineage. The six-pointed star at the top represents the divisional insignia of the 6th Infantry Division, the unit to which the battalion was assigned in World War I. The motto at the bottom of the shield, "Semel et Simul", translates as "At Once and Together."

== Coat of arms ==
- Blazon
  - Shield- Gules, billetté Or; on a canton of the last voided Sable, a sun in splendor of the second charged with the Arabic number "13" of the third (for the 13th Cavalry).
  - Crest- On a wreath of the colors Or and Gules, a six-point mullet Gules charged with the Arabic number "78" Or.
  - Motto- SEMEL ET SIMUL (At Once and Together).
- Symbolism
  - Shield- The field is red for Artillery. The gold billets are from the arms of Franche-Comté, the canton from the badge of the parent organization.
  - Crest- The crest is the divisional shoulder sleeve insignia charged with the number of the regiment.
  - Motto- The unit motto for the 1st Battalion, 78th Field Artillery is "TEAMWORK"
- Background-
  - The coat of arms was originally approved for the 78th Field Artillery Regiment on 16 May 1921. It was redesignated for the 78th Field Artillery Battalion (Armored) on 2 January 1941. It was redesignated for the 78th Armored Field Artillery Battalion on 20 April 1954. It was redesignated for the 78th Artillery Regiment on 17 November 1958. The insignia was redesignated for the 78th Field Artillery Regiment effective 1 September 1971

== Campaign streamers and decorations ==
Campaign Streamers

- World War I
  - Streamer without inscription
- World War II
  - Algeria-French Morocco (with arrowhead)
  - Sicily (with arrowhead)
  - Normandy
  - Northern France Rhineland
  - Ardennes-Alsace Central Europe

Decorations

- Presidential Unit Citation (Army), Streamer embroidered NORMANDY (78th Armored Field Artillery Battalion cited; DA GO 28, 1948)
- French Croix de Guerre with Silver Star, World War II, Streamer embroidered NORMANDY (78th Armored Field Artillery Battalion cited; WD GO 43, 1950)
- Belgian Fourragere 1940 (78th Armored Field Artillery Battalion cited; DA GO 43, 1950)
- Cited in the Order of the Day of Belgian Army for action in BELGIUM (78th Armored Field Artillery Battalion cited; DA GO 43, 1950)
- Cited in the Order of the Day of the Belgian Army for action in the ARDENNES (78th Armored Field Artillery Battalion cited; DA GO 43, 1950)
