= Gerry H. Kisters =

United States Army Medal of Honor recipient (1919–1986)

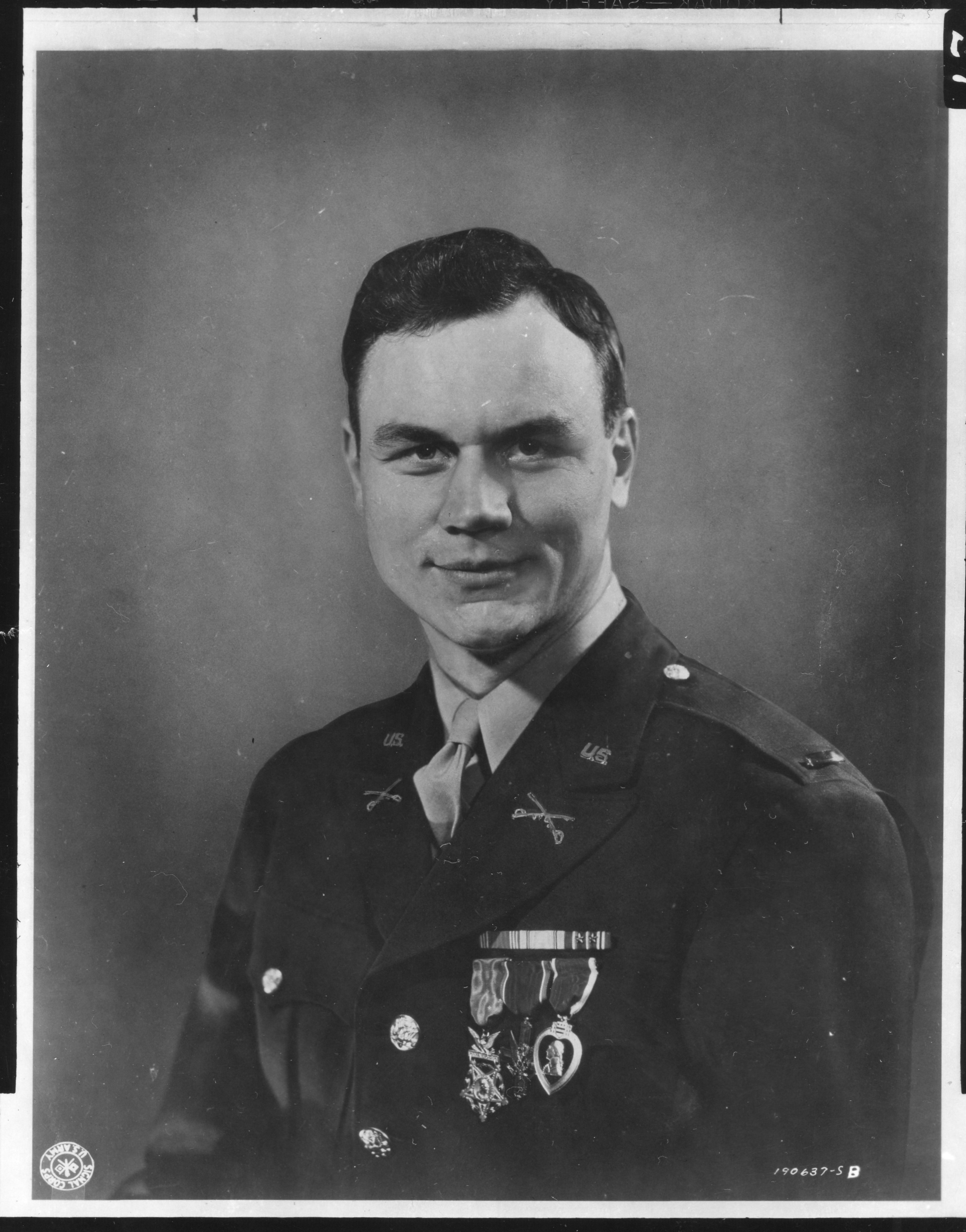
- Kisters in his dress uniform with medals on full display
- Born: March 2, 1919; Salt Lake City, Utah
- Died: May 11, 1986 (aged 67); Bloomington, Indiana
- Burial place: Rose Hill Cemetery (Bloomington)
- Military career
- Allegiance: United States of America
- Branch: United States Army
- Rank: First Lieutenant
- Service number: 35150942
- Units: 91st Reconnaissance Squadron, 2nd Armored Division
- Conflicts: World War II
- Awards: Medal of Honor; Distinguished Service Cross; Purple Heart

Gerry Herman Kisters (March 2, 1919 – May 11, 1986) was a United States Army soldier and a recipient of the United States military's highest decoration, the Medal of Honor, for his actions in World War II.

== Biography ==
Kisters was born in Salt Lake City, Utah, to a family that had worked in the fur trade for generations; his family moved to Bloomington, Indiana, in 1937, where his father opened a fur shop. Kisters worked for his father and then opened his own fur shop in Vincennes, Indiana, operating it for several years before he was drafted in January 1941. He was assigned to a reconnaissance unit training at Fort Bliss, Texas.

By 1942 Kisters's unit, formerly attached to the 1st Cavalry, had become an independent unit, the 91st Cavalry Reconnaissance Squadron. At the end of 1942 they were sent to Casablanca to join the Tunisian campaign. On May 7, 1943, Kisters, now a staff sergeant, surprised and killed the crew of a German 88 mm artillery gun, earning a Distinguished Service Cross,

By July 31, 1943, Kisters's unit was attached to the 2nd Armored Division, then involved in the Allied invasion of Sicily. On that day, near Gagliano, Sicily, he and an officer captured an enemy machine gun position. Kisters then went forward alone and, although wounded in both legs and his right arm on his approach, single-handedly captured a second machine gun emplacement. He was subsequently promoted to second lieutenant and, on February 18, 1944, was awarded his Distinguished Service Cross and the Medal of Honor. He was the first American soldier to be awarded both during World War II. He was featured in war bond drives and the Monroe County Airport was named Kisters Field in his honor.

Kisters was sent back to the U.S. and spent months recovering from his injuries. After his recovery he taught reconnaissance at Fort Riley in Kansas and reached the rank of first lieutenant. After the war he reopened his fur shop and became a successful businessman.

He died at age 67 and was buried at Rose Hill Cemetery in Bloomington, Indiana.

== Citations ==
Kisters' official Medal of Honor citation reads:

On 31 July 1943, near Gagliano, Sicily, a detachment of 1 officer and 9 enlisted men, including Sgt. Kisters, advancing ahead of the leading elements of U.S. troops to fill a large crater in the only available vehicle route through Gagliano, was taken under fire by 2 enemy machineguns. Sgt. Kisters and the officer, unaided and in the face of intense small arms fire, advanced on the nearest machinegun emplacement and succeeded in capturing the gun and its crew of 4. Although the greater part of the remaining small arms fire was now directed on the captured machinegun position, Sgt. Kisters voluntarily advanced alone toward the second gun emplacement. While creeping forward, he was struck 5 times by enemy bullets, receiving wounds in both legs and his right arm. Despite the wounds, he continued to advance on the enemy, and captured the second machinegun after killing 3 of its crew and forcing the fourth member to flee. The courage of this soldier and his unhesitating willingness to sacrifice his life, if necessary, served as an inspiration to the command.

Kisters' Distinguished Service Cross Citation reads:

The President of the United States of America, authorized by Act of Congress July 9, 1918, takes pleasure in presenting the Distinguished Service Cross to Staff Sergeant Gerry Herman Kisters (ASN: 35150942), United States Army, for extraordinary heroism in connection with military operations against an armed enemy while serving with Company B, 91st Reconnaissance Squadron, 2d Armored Division. On ** May 1943, near ***, Tunisia, Staff Sergeant Kisters made several individual reconnaissance missions, returning each time with timely and valuable information concerning location of artillery emplacements. Alone, and while subjected to enemy heavy artillery and concentrated machine gun fire, and individual rifle fire, Staff Sergeant Kisters crept forward on an artillery piece which was firing on our forces near ***. By the effective use of his hand grenades and rifle, Staff Sergeant Kisters wiped out the entire crew. The extraordinary heroism, initiative, and devotion to duty with complete disregard for his own welfare displayed by Staff Sergeant Kisters reflect great credit upon himself and the military service, and are deserving of the highest praise.

== Awards and decorations ==

1st row	Medal of Honor	Distinguished Service Cross	Bronze Star Medal
2nd row	Purple Heart	Army Good Conduct Medal	American Defense Service Medal
3rd row	American Campaign Medal	European–African–Middle Eastern Campaign Medal with arrowhead and two campaign stars	World War II Victory Medal

== See also ==
- List of Medal of Honor recipients
- List of Medal of Honor recipients for World War II
