= 92nd Field Artillery Regiment =

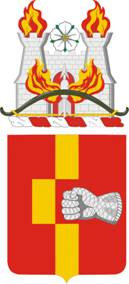
- Coat of arms
- Active: 1933–1996
- Country: United States
- Branch: Army
- Type: Field artillery
- Motto(s): Brave Cannons
- Engagements: World War II; Korean War; Vietnam War; Gulf War

Insignia
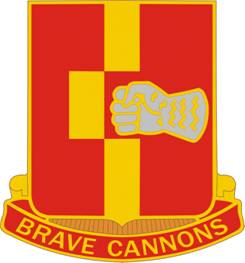
- Distinctive unit insignia

The 92nd Field Artillery Regiment is an inactive parent regiment of the Field Artillery Branch of the United States Army. It was constituted in 1933, with its last active battalions, the 1st and 3rd Battalions, inactivated in 1996.

== History ==
=== Interwar period ===
The regiment was constituted on 1 October 1933 in the Regular Army as the 92nd Field Artillery. It was assigned to VIII Corps's 18th Field Artillery Brigade and allotted to the Eighth Corps Area. It was organized by 1934 with headquarters at Tulsa as a Regular Army Inactive unit, manned by a small cadre of Organized Reserve personnel. The regiment conducted summer training at Fort Sill, and was inactivated by January 1940 after its reservists were relieved from the unit. It was reorganized by February 1941 with more reservists at Tulsa.

=== World War II ===
It was redesignated on 1 January 1942 as the 92nd Armored Field Artillery Battalion and assigned to the 2nd Armored Division. It was activated on 8 January at Fort Benning. The 92nd was equipped with M7 Priest 105 mm self-propelled guns. It spent almost a year training in the United States and participated in the 1942 Louisiana and North Carolina maneuvers. In December, it embarked from New York aboard the USAT Thomas H. Barry to join the rest of the division near Rabat, landing on 24 December near Casablanca.

The battalion then moved north to the Mamora Forest near Rabat, where it and the division guarded against a possible Spanish attack from Spanish Morocco. For the next several months, the battalion conducted training, and in March and April it relocated forward with the division to Port-aux-Poules in Algeria, east of Oran. There, the battalion conducted amphibious assault training with LCTs in preparation for the Allied invasion of Sicily, which began on 10 July. However, the battalion remained in reserve at Port-aux-Poules with the division's Combat Command Reserve (CCR) during the invasion due to a lack of transports and the division's need for mobility rather than support troops in Sicily. Due to the speed of the Axis collapse on the island the 92nd was not needed for the operation.

After turning in its vehicles and equipment, the 92nd was embarked aboard a British liner, now a troop transport, at Oran in November. It landed at Liverpool on 24 November, and was transported to Tidworth Camp, where it received new Priests and half-tracks. The battalion spent the winter and early spring of 1944 training for the Invasion of Normandy on the Salisbury Plain. In late April it began practicing loading equipment onto LCTs for the invasion. On 6 June the battalion received orders to march to Southampton for embarkation aboard LCTs, but its crossing of the English Channel was delayed due to the fierce German resistance at Omaha Beach. It arrived off Vierville-sur-Mer at dusk on 10 June, and landed on Omaha Beach in the afternoon of 11 June.

With the 2nd Armored, the battalion fought in the Normandy campaign, the Northern France Campaign, the Rhineland Campaign, the Ardennes-Alsace campaign, and the Central Europe Campaign of World War II.

=== Korean War ===
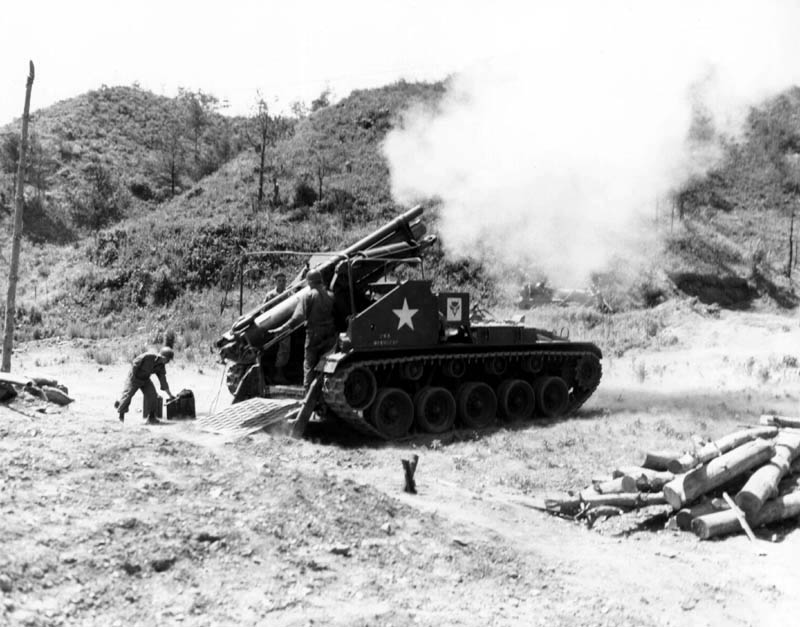
155-mm howitzer M41 Howitzer Motor Carriage acting as "base gun" for Battery A, 92nd Armored Field Artillery Battalion, firing adjusting rounds near Kimhwa County (Korea).

At the onset of the Korean War, the 92nd Field Artillery Battalion was detached from the 2nd Armored Division on 10 November 1950 and deployed to Korea as an independent battalion under the command of Lieutenant Colonel Leon F. Lavoie. At the time, the unit was equipped with 155mm M41 Gorilla self-propelled howitzers. In a conflict in which enemy units frequently infiltrated or overran forward positions, the battlefield mobility and defensive firepower and armor of M-41 units was seen as being greatly preferable to that of towed artillery units, leading Lt Col. Lavoie to advocate for the conversion of all towed artillery to self-propelled chassis. The 92nd is recorded as having fired the 150,000th and 300,000th artillery shells of the war. It was inactivated on 27 July 1955 in Japan.

=== Parent regiment ===
The regiment was reorganized and redesignated on 31 March 1958 as the 92nd Artillery, a Combat Arms Regimental System (CARS) parent regiment, and was redesignated as the 92nd Field Artillery on 1 September 1971. On 1 July 1986, it was withdrawn from CARS and reorganized under the United States Army Regimental System.

==== Battery A and 1st Battalion ====
Battery A was constituted on 1 October 1933 in the Regular Army, and served with the 92nd Armored Field Artillery Battalion in World War II and the Korean War. It was inactivated along with the battalion on 27 July 1955 in Japan. On 31 March 1958, it was redesignated as Headquarters and Headquarters Battery, 1st Battalion, 92nd Artillery. On 25 June 1958, the 1st Battalion became the 1st Howitzer Battalion, and was activated in Germany along with organic elements. The battalion fought in the Vietnam War from 1967 to 1971, providing fire support to American units there. It received a Valorous Unit Award and the Republic of Vietnam Gallantry Cross with Palm and Streamer. On 5 February 1968, the battalion was redesignated as the 1st Battalion, 92nd Field Artillery. It was assigned to the 2nd Armored Division on 30 November 1971. The battery was reorganized and redesignated as Battery A, 92nd Field Artillery, on 1 July 1986, and the rest of the battalion was inactivated. The battery remained with the 2nd Armored Division and was inactivated on 15 September 1991 at Fort Hood after fighting in the Gulf War. It was reactivated on 16 December 1992 at Fort Hood, and inactivated there on 15 January 1996, being relieved from the division.

==== 2nd Battalion ====
Battery B was constituted 1 October 1933 in the Regular Army, and served with the 92nd Armored Field Artillery Battalion in World War II and the Korean War. It was inactivated along with the battalion on 27 July 1955 in Japan. It was redesignated on 31 March 1958 as Headquarters and Headquarters Battery, 2d Battalion, 92d Artillery. On 25 June, the battalion became the 2nd Howitzer Battalion and was activated in Europe along with its organic elements. It was redesignated on 24 March 1964 as the 2nd Battalion, 92nd Artillery and on 1 September 1971 as the 2nd Battalion, 92nd Field Artillery. The battalion was inactivated on 16 April 1988 in Germany.

==== 3rd Battalion ====
Battery C was constituted 1 October 1933 in the Regular Army, and served with the 92nd Armored Field Artillery Battalion in World War II and the Korean War. It was inactivated along with the battalion on 27 July 1955 in Japan. It was redesignated on 31 March 1958 as Headquarters and Headquarters Battery, 3rd Battalion, 92d Artillery. The battalion became the 3rd Howitzer Battalion on 30 April 1959 and was withdrawn from the Regular Army and allocated to the Army Reserve, with its organic elements being constituted. The battalion was activated on 1 June 1959 with headquarters at Canton, Ohio. On 1 December 1963, it became the 3rd Battalion, 92nd Artillery, and on 1 September 1971 the 3rd Battalion, 92nd Field Artillery. Its headquarters was moved to Akron on 26 October 1969, and the battalion was inactivated on 15 March 1996.

==== 4th Battalion ====
Battery D was constituted on 1 October 1933 in the Regular Army, and was absorbed by Battery A on 8 January 1942. It was reconstituted on 31 March 1958 and redesignated as Headquarters and Headquarters Battery, 4th Battalion, 92nd Artillery. On 30 April 1959, the battalion became the 4th Howitzer Battalion and was withdrawn from the Regular Army and allocated to the Army Reserve. Its organic elements were simultaneously reconstituted, and the battalion was activated on 1 June 1959 with headquarters at Clearfield, Pennsylvania. In the fall of 1961, the battalion was ordered into active military service at Clearfield during the Berlin Crisis. It was released on 10 August 1962 from active military service and reverted to reserve status after serving at Fort Bragg. The battalion was redesignated 4th Battalion, 92nd Artillery on 31 January 1968 and 4th Battalion, 92nd Field Artillery on 1 September 1971. On 15 November, its headquarters was moved to Erie. The 4th Battalion was inactivated on 15 December 1993 at Erie.

==== 5th Battalion ====
Battery E was constituted 1 October 1933 in the Regular Army and was absorbed by Battery B on 8 January 1942. It was reconstituted on 31 March 1958 and redesignated as Headquarters and Headquarters Battery, 5th Battalion, 92d Artillery. On 1 April 1960, the battalion became the 5th Howitzer Battalion and was assigned to the 24th Infantry Division and activated in Germany. Simultaneously, organic elements were constituted and activated. The battalion was inactivated on 1 February 1963. It was redesignated as the 5th Howitzer Battalion, 92nd Field Artillery on 1 September 1971 and on 15 September 2003 as the 5th Battalion, 92nd Field Artillery, while inactive.

==== 6th Battalion ====
Battery F was constituted 1 October 1933 in the Regular Army and was absorbed by Battery C on 8 January 1942. It was reconstituted on 31 March 1938 and redesignated as Headquarters and Headquarters Battery, 6th Battalion, 92nd Artillery. It was assigned to the 2nd Armored Division on 31 May 1963, when its organic elements were constituted. The 6th Battalion was activated at Fort Hood on 8 July 1963. It was redesignated as the 6th Battalion, 92d Field Artillery on 1 September 1972, and inactivated at Fort Hood on 30 November.

== Honors ==
The 92nd Field Artillery was awarded six campaign streamers and four unit decorations in World War II, ten campaign streamers and two unit decorations in the Korean War, twelve campaign streamers and one unit decoration in the Vietnam War, and three campaign streamers and one unit decoration in the Gulf War, for a total of 31 campaign streamers and eight unit decorations.

=== Unit decorations ===
Ribbon	Award	Year	Notes
Dark blue ribbon with a gold border	Presidential Unit Citation (Army)	1944	for the Normandy campaign
Dark blue ribbon with a gold border	Presidential Unit Citation (Army)	1950	for the engagement at Chinhung-Ni during the Battle of Chosin Reservoir
	Valorous Unit Award	1969	Streamer embroidered "DAK TO–BEN HET"
	Navy Unit Commendation	1990–1991	Streamer embroidered "SAUDI ARABIA–KUWAIT"
	Belgian Fourragere 1940	1944–1945	
	Cited in the Order of the Day of the Belgian Army		for actions in Belgium
	Cited in the Order of the Day of the Belgian Army		for actions in the Ardennes
White ribbon with vertical green and red stripes on its edges and a red and blue circle in the middle	Republic of Korea Presidential Unit Citation	1950	Streamer embroidered "INCHON TO HUNGNAM"

Republic of Vietnam Gallantry Cross Unit Citation with Palm, confirmed in Department of the Army General Order 54, 1974

=== Campaign streamers ===
Conflict	Streamer	Year(s)
World War II	Sicily (with arrowhead)	1943
World War II	Normandy	1944
World War II	Northern France	1944
World War II	Rhineland	1944
World War II	Ardennes–Alsace	1944–1945
World War II	Central Europe	1945
Korean War	UN Defensive	1950
Korean War	UN Offensive	1950
Korean War	CCF Intervention	1950
Korean War	First UN Counteroffensive	1950
Korean War	CCF Spring Offensive	1951
Korean War	UN Summer-Fall Offensive	1951
Korean War	Second Korean Winter	1951–1952
Korean War	Korea, Summer-Fall 1952	1952
Korean War	Third Korean Winter	1952–1953
Korean War	Korea, Summer 1953	1953
Vietnam War	Counteroffensive, Phase II	1967
Vietnam War	Counteroffensive, Phase III	1967–1968
Vietnam War	Tet Counteroffensive	1968
Vietnam War	Counteroffensive, Phase IV	1968
Vietnam War	Counteroffensive, Phase V	1968
Vietnam War	Counteroffensive, Phase VI	1968–1969
Vietnam War	Tet 69/Counteroffensive Consolidation I	1969
Vietnam War	Summer–Fall 1969	1969
Vietnam War	Winter–Spring 1970	1969–1970
Vietnam War	Sanctuary Counteroffensive	1970
Vietnam War	Counteroffensive, Phase VII	1970–1971
Vietnam War	Consolidation I	1971
Gulf War	Defense of Saudi Arabia	1990–1991
Gulf War	Liberation and Defense of Kuwait	1991
Gulf War	Cease-Fire	1991

== Distinctive unit insignia ==
- Description

A Gold color metal and enamel device 1 5/32 inches (2.9 cm) in height overall consisting of a shield blazoned: Gules, a pallet rompu Or, in sinister fess a dexter mailed clenched fist, couped at the wrist Proper. Attached below and to the sides of the shield a Red scroll inscribed “BRAVE CANNONS” in Gold letters.

- Symbolism

Scarlet and yellow are the colors used for Artillery. The mailed fist symbolizes the armored attack of the organization.

- Background

The distinctive unit insignia was originally approved for the 92nd Armored Field Artillery Battalion on 20 June 1942. It was redesignated for the 92d Artillery Regiment on 12 November 1958. The insignia was redesignated effective 1 September 1971, for the 92d Field Artillery Regiment.

== Coat of arms ==
=== Blazon ===
- Shield

Gules, a pallet rompu Or, in sinister fess a dexter mailed clenched fist, couped at the wrist Proper.

- Crest

On a wreath of the colors Argent and Gules a castle of the first with entrance arch Sanguine and two turrets inflamed Proper the battlements between the turrets supporting a Rose of Sharon also Proper and in base a bow fesswise Sable with drawstring Or armed with a fire arrow point up palewise inflamed all Proper.

- Motto: Brave Cannons.

=== Symbolism ===
- Shield

Scarlet and yellow are the colors used for Artillery. The mailed fist symbolizes the armored attack of the organization.

- Crest

The fire arrow hurled from an arbalest, an early artillery weapon, symbolizes the mission of the battalion. The shape of the bow further alludes to the Battle of the Bulge in which the unit participated. The flames refer to the fire support provided in the Normandy invasion for which they were awarded the Presidential Unit Citation. The arrow further alludes to their assault landings and the medieval castle traditionally represents the areas in which the unit fought during World War II: Europe, France and Germany. The Rose of Sharon (the Korean national flower) symbolizes service in Korea for which they were awarded the Korean Presidential Unit Citation.

- Background

The coat of arms was originally approved for the 92nd Armored Field Artillery Battalion on 24 June 1942. It was redesignated for the 92d Artillery Regiment on 12 November 1958. It was amended to add a crest on 19 October 1965. The insignia was redesignated effective 1 September 1971, for the 92d Field Artillery Regiment.
