= 3rd Aviation Regiment (United States) =

- coat of arms
- Active: August 1987 -
- Country: United States
- Branch: United States Army Aviation Branch
- Type: Aviation
- Part of: 3rd Infantry Division (United States)
- Mottos: Ex Alis Pugnamus; Latin: "We Fight On Wings"
- Colors: Ultramarine Blue, Golden orange

Insignia
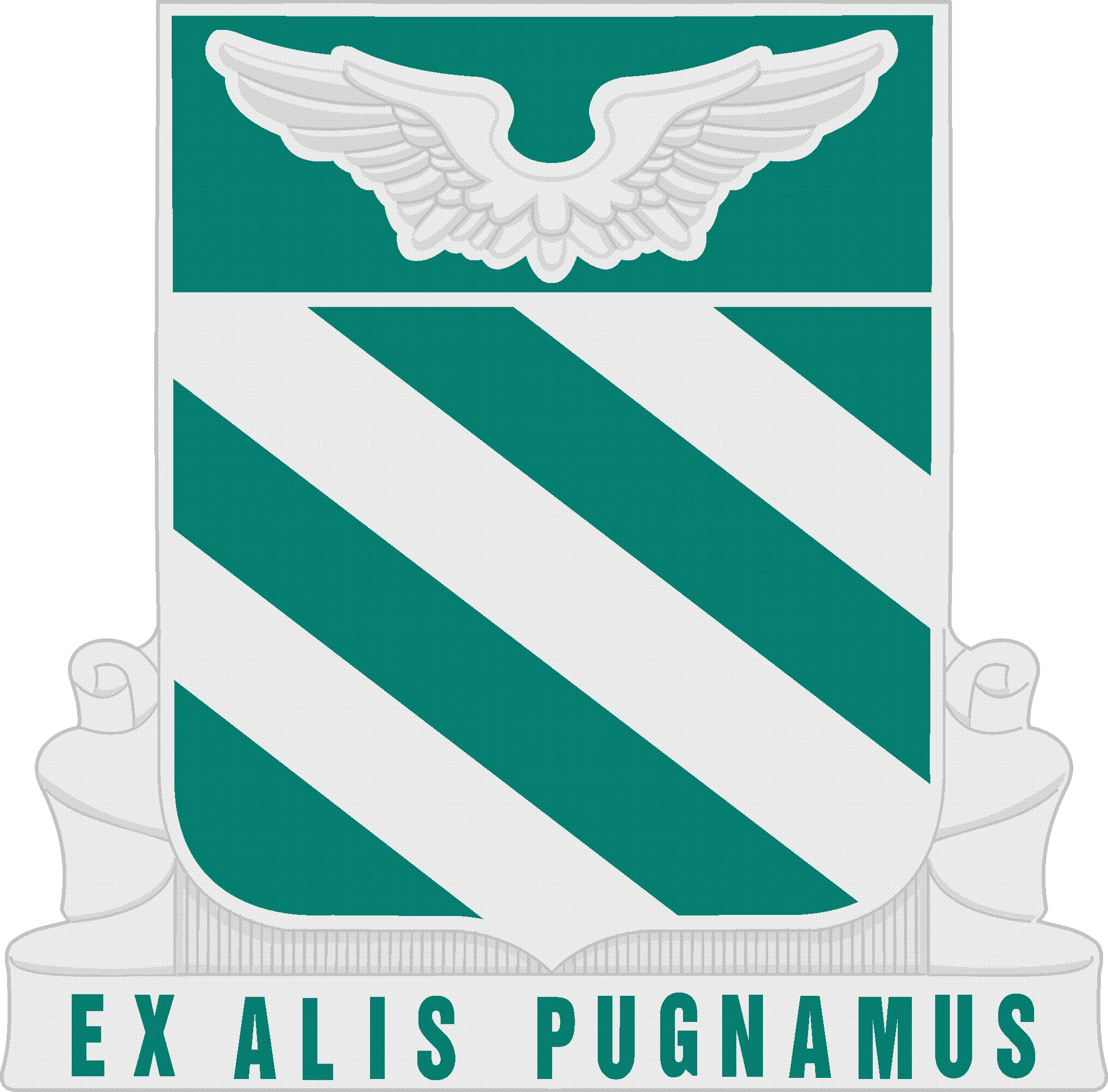
- Distinctive Unit Insignia

Aircraft flown
- Attack helicopter: AH-64E Apache
- Cargo helicopter: CH-47F Chinook
- Utility helicopter: UH-60M Black Hawk
- Reconnaissance: MQ-1C Gray Eagle

The 3rd Aviation Regiment is a regiment of the United States Army Aviation Branch. It operates the Boeing AH-64 Apache attack helicopter, Sikorsky UH-60 Black Hawk helicopter, and Boeing CH-47 Chinook helicopter. It has been associated with the 3rd Infantry Division for some time.

== History ==
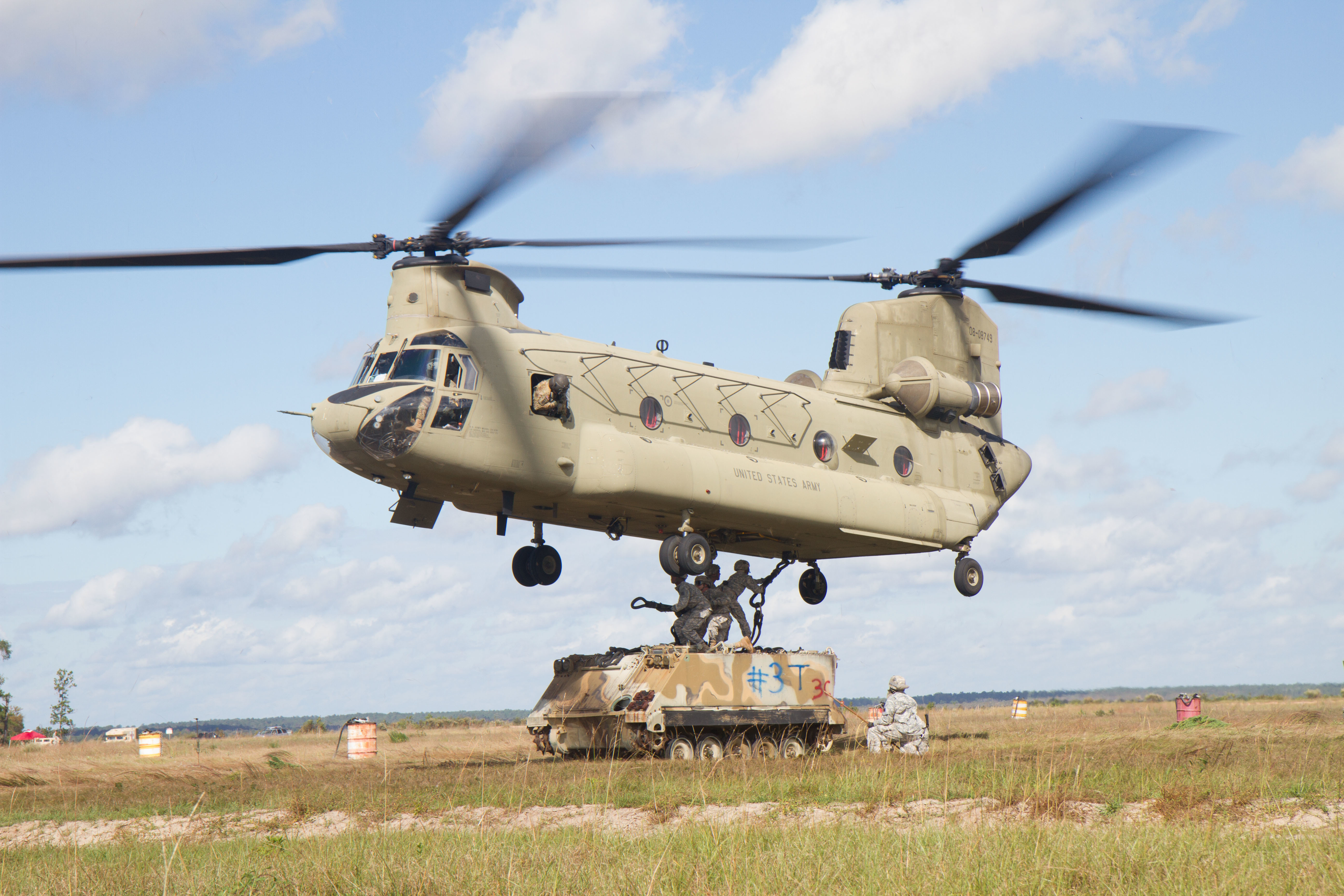
M113 armored personnel carrier being slung underneath a CH-47 Chinook of 2nd Battalion, 3rd Aviation Regiment

Originally designated the 3d Aviation Company (Combat), the unit was activated and assigned to the 3d Infantry Division on 1 July 1957 at Fort Benning, Georgia. On 5 June 1963, the 3d Aviation Battalion was activated in Germany. (Despite being activated, however, the unit was largely unmanned beyond company strength. Due to the demand for aviators and maintenance personnel in Vietnam, as well as spare parts, divisional aviation battalions based in Europe and the continental United States usually did not exist.) The battalion was formally inactivated on 15 January 1967 in Germany and reactivated there on 21 August 1978. In April 1981, the 3d Aviation Battalion (Combat) relocated from Kitzingen Army Airfield to Giebelstadt Army Airfield.

On 16 November 1984, the aviation component of the 3d Infantry Division was expanded and provisionally activated as the U.S. Army's first combat aviation brigade in a mechanized infantry division. The brigade was officially activated on 15 March 1985 as the Aviation Brigade, 3d Infantry Division and contained all of the aviation units of the 3d Infantry Division, some of which were redesignated or reflagged on 16 June 1987 as elements of the 3d Aviation Regiment. (While informally referred to as the 4th Brigade to put it on par with the division's three mechanized/armored brigades, its actual designation was "Aviation Brigade, 3d Infantry Division.") The brigade consisted of two attack helicopter battalions (reflagged as 2-3 and 3-3 in 1987), one general support battalion (Task Force 23), and a divisional cavalry squadron (3d Squadron, 7th Cavalry Regiment (3-7 Cav)).

When the Army went "regimental" with its Aviation branch in 1987, the company lineages of the 3d Aviation Battalion were perpetuated in the following manner:

HHC:

- Headquarters Company, 3d Aviation Battalion, reorganized and redesignated 16 August 1987 as Company D, 3d Aviation; concurrently relieved from assignment to the 3d Infantry Division and assigned to the 2d Armored Division (Headquarters, 3d Aviation Battalion – hereafter separate lineage)
- Inactivated 15 March 1991 at Fort Hood, Texas, and relieved from assignment to the 2d Armored Division
- Redesignated 16 May 2004 as Headquarters and Headquarters Company, 4th Battalion, 3d Aviation, and activated at Fort Campbell, Kentucky (organic elements concurrently constituted and activated)
- Battalion redesignated 1 October 2005 as the 4th Battalion, 3d Aviation Regiment

Company A:

- Reorganized and redesignated 16 August 1987 as Headquarters and Headquarters Company, 1st Battalion, 3d Aviation; concurrently relieved from assignment to the 3d Infantry Division and assigned to the 2d Armored Division (organic elements concurrently constituted and activated)
- Relieved 14 August 1991 from assignment to the 2d Armored Division
- Inactivated 15 August 1991 at Fort Campbell, Kentucky
- Assigned 16 February 1996 to the 3d Infantry Division and activated at Fort Stewart, Georgia
- Relieved 16 May 2004 from assignment to the 3d Infantry Division and assigned to the Combat Aviation Brigade, 3d Infantry Division
- Redesignated 1 October 2005 as the 1st Battalion, 3d Aviation Regiment
- Inactivated 15 September 2015 at Hunter Army Airfield, Georgia
- Activated 15 October 2015 in Germany

Company B:

- Reorganized and redesignated 16 August 1987 as Headquarters and Headquarters Company, 2d Battalion, 3d Aviation, and remained assigned to the 3d Infantry Division (organic elements concurrently constituted and activated)
- Relieved 15 January 1991 from assignment to the 3d Infantry Division
- Inactivated 15 July 1993 in Germany
- Assigned 16 February 1996 to the 3d Infantry Division and activated at Fort Stewart, Georgia
- Relieved 16 May 2004 from assignment to the 3d Infantry Division and assigned to the Combat Aviation Brigade, 3d Infantry Division
- Redesignated 1 October 2005 as the 2d Battalion, 3d Aviation Regiment

Company E:

- Constituted 16 November 1979 in the Regular Army as Company E, 3d Aviation Battalion, an element of the 3d Infantry Division, and activated in Germany
- Reorganized and redesignated 16 August 1987 as Company E, 3d Aviation, relieved from assignment to the 3d Infantry Division, and assigned to the 2d Armored Division
- Inactivated 15 February 1991 at Fort Hood, Texas, and relieved from assignment to the 2d Armored Division
- Redesignated 1 October 2005 as Company E, 3d Aviation Regiment
- Activated 16 October 2008 at Fort Huachuca, Arizona
- Assigned 16 February 2013 to the Combat Aviation Brigade, 3d Infantry Division

The 1st Battalion, 3d Aviation Regiment, deployed from Fort Hood to Saudi Arabia in the fall of 1990 attached to and with support from the 1st Cavalry Division (also based at Ft. Hood). The battalion was at that time part of 2d Armored Division. It was equipped with McDonnell Douglas AH-64 Apache attack helicopters. The battalion participated in many air strikes along the border region during the air portion of the campaign. The unit provided covering missions when the ground forces advanced into Iraq. 1st Battalion, 3rd Aviation Regiment was pulled back into Saudi Arabia after the cease fire, with two squads staging in Kuwait to provide refueling and rearming services for battalion aircraft if hostilities resumed. The unit returned to Fort Hood, Texas in May 1991 and continued the inactivation that was interrupted when Iraq invaded Kuwait. The unit was inactivated in July 1991 and the regimental flag transferred to sister unit 3rd Battalion, 3rd Aviation Regiment based in Germany. The unit was transferred as a whole to Fort Campbell, KY in July/August 1991 and became the 2d Battalion, 101st Aviation Regiment (part of the 101st Airborne Division (Air Assault)).

In April 1991, the Brigade deployed to Northern Iraq and Southwest Turkey to support the Kurdish refugees and prevent further Iraqi aggression in the region.

During the post-Cold War drawdown of US forces in Germany, the brigade's flag was transferred on 16 February 1996 to Fort Stewart as part of the reflagging of the 24th Infantry Division (Mechanized) as the 3d Infantry Division (Mechanized). In February 1998, the Aviation Brigade deployed to Kuwait for Operation Desert Thunder and played a part in deterring Iraqi aggression.

From September 2000 to October 2001, elements of the Aviation Brigade deployed to Bosnia-Herzegovina for SFOR 8 and SFOR and enforcement of the Dayton Peace Accords. In August 2002, the Brigade deployed to Kuwait to prepare for the 2003 invasion of Iraq. At 201830z March 2003, the Aviation Brigade, as the Division's main effort, initiated combat operations with supporting fires from the Division Artillery. During the battle at An Nasiriah, the Aviation Brigade shaped the battlespace in order for 3d Brigade to destroy enemy unit's in the vicinity of the Highway 1 Bridge and Tallil Airbase. In Baghdad, the Brigade continued to play a vital role in the ongoing fight for the security of the city.

In 2004, the brigade was redesigned as the U.S. Army's first modular Combat Aviation Brigade and deployed to Iraq in January 2005 for Operation Iraqi Freedom III. This redesign enabled the brigade to significantly increase its ability to operate 24 hours a day for an indefinite period providing an unprecedented level of aviation combat power to the division. The brigade's accomplishments include flying over 80,000 hours in support of over 26,707 combat missions to include over 13,455 attack and recon missions, 289 air assaults and raids, and over 3,760 MEDEVAC missions transporting over 4,998 patients. The attack aircraft provided 24-hour coverage over the Multi-National Division - Baghdad area of responsibility from January 2005 to January 2006, proving to be the Division's most flexible and effective, quick reaction force. With an additional assault helicopter battalion and the Chinooks in the general support aviation battalion, the brigade was able to offer the division a new mission - Air Assault. The brigade also performed general aviation support missions, including being the sole provider of helicopter support for the senior members of the Iraqi Transitional Government.

== Distinctive unit insignia ==
The distinctive unit insignia was originally approved for the 3d Aviation Battalion on 29 August 1963. It was amended to correct the symbolism on 6 September 1963. It was rescinded on 8 July 1976. It was reinstated for the 3d Aviation Battalion and amended to revise the symbolism on 10 April 1978. The insignia was redesignated for the 3d Aviation Regiment with the description revised on 1 July 1987.

The insignia is a silver color metal and enamel device 1 1/8 inches (2.9 cm) in height overall consisting of a shield blazoned: Azure (Teal Blue), three bendlets Argent, on a chief of the first, a pair of wings displayed fesswise of the second. Attached below the shield a Silver scroll inscribed "EX ALIS PUGNAMUS" in blue letters.

== Deployments ==
- 1st Battalion
  - Afghanistan 2012-2013 (Previously 2-159th Attack Reconnaissance Battalion "Gunslingers" (AH-64D)).
- 2d Battalion "Knighthawks" (Hunter Army Airfield)
  - Company A (UH-60L) "Barnstormers"
    - Afghanistan 2017 - 2018
    - Operation Atlantic Resolve 2019 - 2020
  - Company B (CH-47F) "Hercules"
    - Afghanistan 2017 - 2018
  - Company C (HH-60M) "Dustoff"
    - Afghanistan 2017 - 2018
  - Company F
    - Afghanistan Nov 2009 - Nov 2010
    - Afghanistan Dec 2012 – Jul 2013
- 3d Battalion
  - Iraq 2005 (Previously 1st Battalion, 229th Aviation Regiment).
- 3d Squadron, 17th Cavalry Regiment "Lighthorse" (Hunter Army Airfield)
  - Troop A (AH-64E)
- 4th Battalion (Assault Helicopter) "Brawlers" (Hunter Army Airfield)
  - Company A (UH-60M) "Spiders"
    - Afghanistan 2017 - 2018
  - Company B (UH-60M) “Blackhearts”
    - Afghanistan 2017 - 2018
  - Company C (UH-60M) “Ravens”
    - Afghanistan 2017-2018
  - Company D "Demons"
    - Afghanistan 2017 - 2018
  - Company E “Executioners”
    - Iraq 2009-2010
    - Iraq 2010-2011

== Structure ==
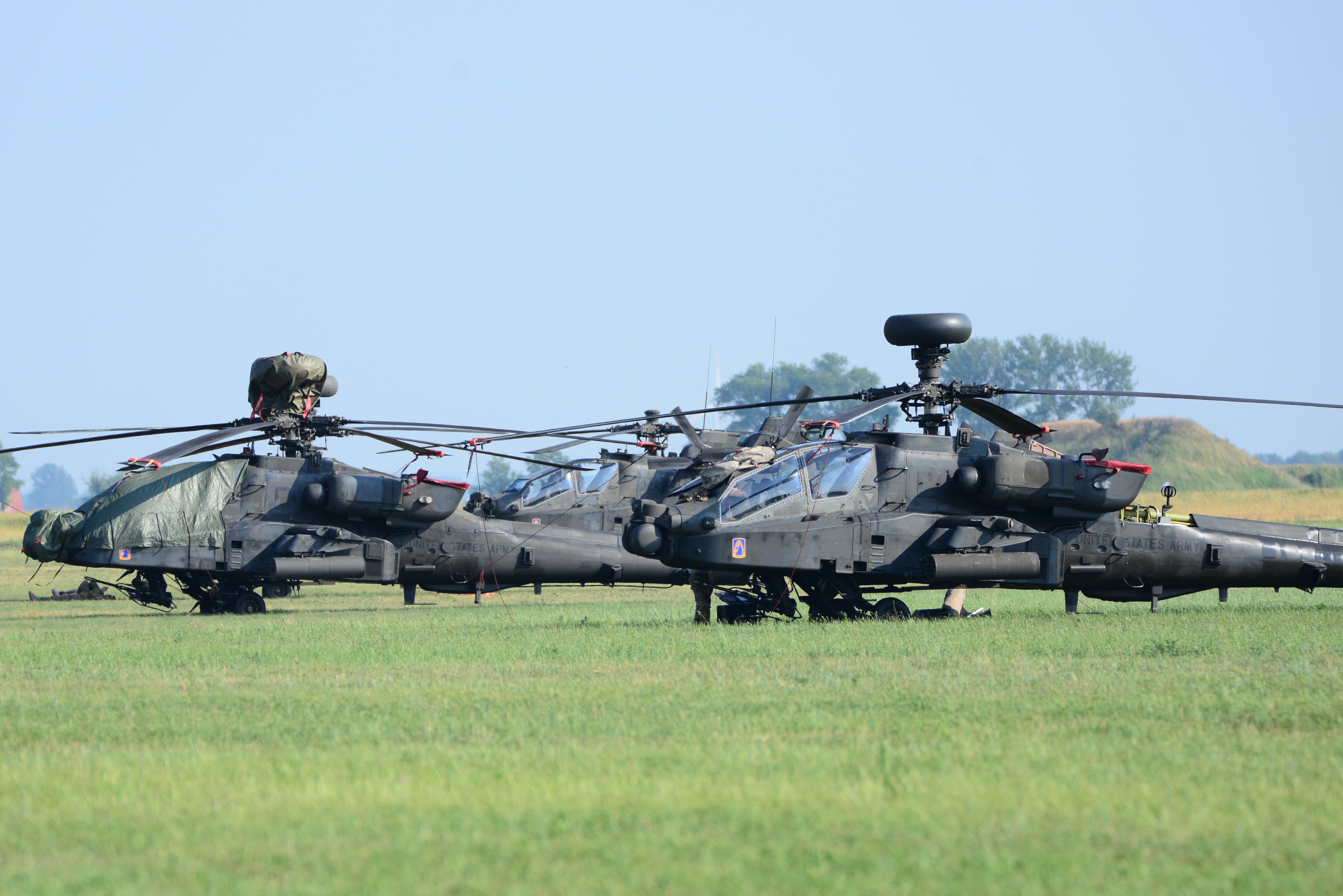
Apache helicopters from the 1st Battalion, 3rd Aviation Regiment (Attack Reconnaissance), 12th Combat Aviation Brigade

- 1st Battalion (Attack Reconnaissance) "Vipers" Combat Aviation Brigade, 3rd Infantry Division
- 2nd Battalion "Knighthawks" (Hunter Army Airfield)
  - Company A (UH-60) "Barnstormers"
    - Afghanistan 2017 - 2018
    - Operation Atlantic Resolve 2019 - 2020
  - Company B (CH-47F) "Hercules"
    - Afghanistan 2017 - 2018
  - Company C (HH-60) "Dustoff"
    - Afghanistan 2017 - 2018
  - Company D
  - Company E (Forward Support) "Eagles"
  - Company F
    - Afghanistan Nov 2009 - Nov 2010
    - Afghanistan Dec 2012 – Jul 2013
- 3rd Battalion
  - Iraq 2005 (Previously 1st Battalion, 229th Aviation Regiment).
- 3d Squadron, 17th Cavalry Regiment "Lighthorse" (Hunter Army Airfield)
  - Troop A (AH-64E)
- 4th Battalion (Assault Helicopter) "Brawlers" (Hunter Army Airfield)
  - Company A (UH-60) "Spiders"
    - Afghanistan 2017 - 2018
  - Company B (UH-60) “Blackhearts”
    - Afghanistan 2017 - 2018
  - Company C (UH-60) “Ravens”
    - Afghanistan 2017-2018
  - Company D "Demons"
    - Afghanistan 2017 - 2018
  - Company E
- 603rd Aviation Support Battalion (603rd ASB) "Workhorse"
