= John W. Woodmansee =

Lieutenant general of the U.S. Army

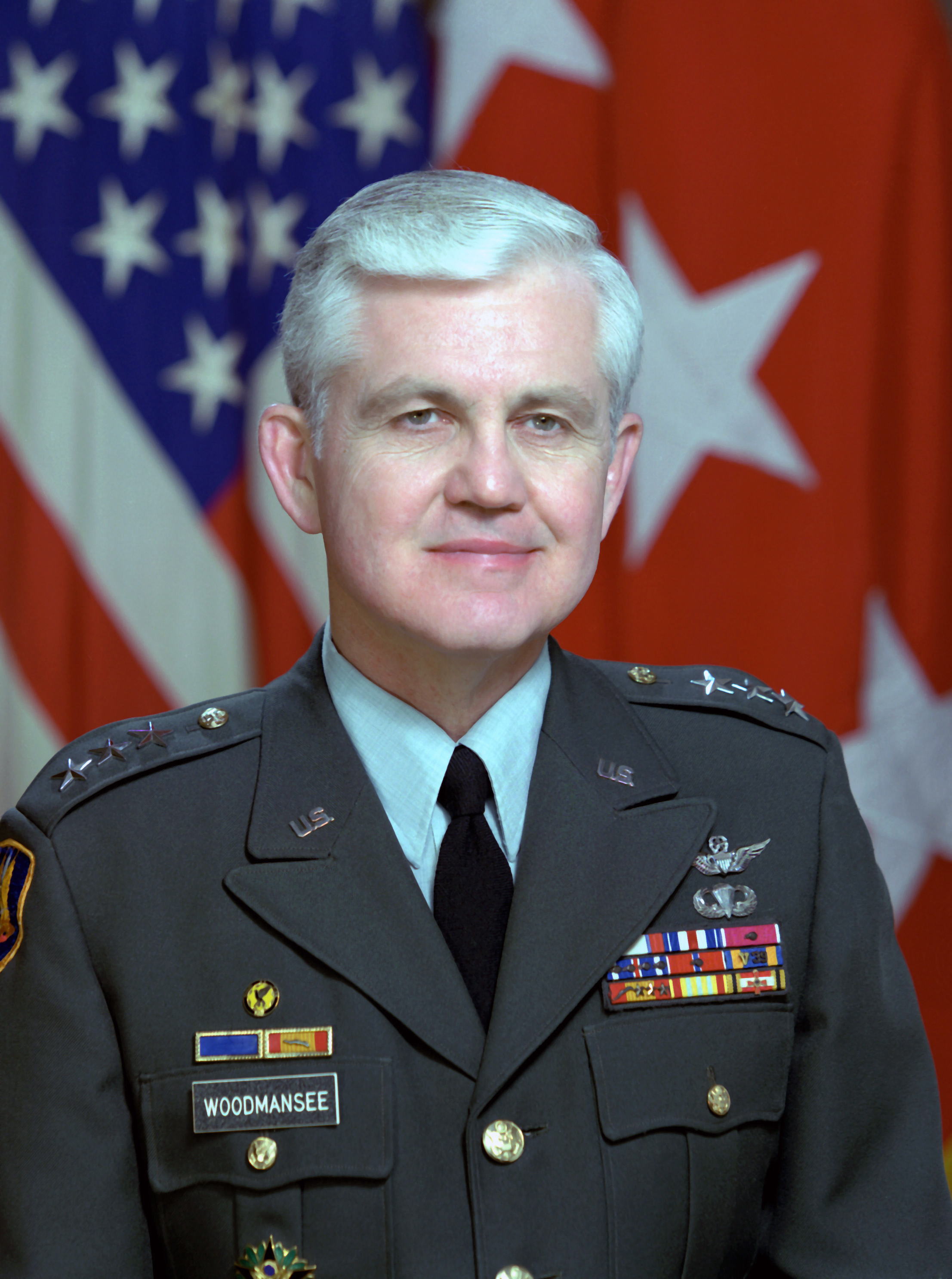
- Born: 27 January 1934 (age 92); Charlotte, North Carolina, U.S.
- Military career
- Allegiance: United States
- Branch: United States Army
- Service years: 1956–1989
- Rank: Lieutenant general
- Commands: V Corps; 2nd Armored Division; 1st Brigade, 1st Cavalry Division; 7th Squadron, 1st Air Cavalry, 1st Aviation Brigade
- Conflicts: Vietnam War
- Awards: Distinguished Service Medal (2); Silver Star Medal; Legion of Merit (2); Distinguished Flying Cross (5); Bronze Star Medal (2); Air Medal (39)

John William Woodmansee Jr. (born 27 January 1934) is a retired lieutenant general in the United States Army. His assignments included Commanding General of V Corps. He graduated from Culver Military Academy in 1952 and from the United States Military Academy in with a B.S. degree in military science in 1956. Woodmansee later earned an M.S. degree in public administration from George Washington University in 1965 and an M.A. degree in political science from Stanford University in 1973. In 1988, he was posted to West Germany.

Trained as an armor officer and helicopter pilot, Woodmansee was awarded the Silver Star Medal, five Distinguished Flying Crosses, two Bronze Star Medals (2) and 39 Air Medals for his service during the Vietnam War, where he flew over 1,500 combat hours. Woodmansee has also received two Distinguished Service Medals and two awards of the Legion of Merit.
