= William F. Streeter =

United States Army general

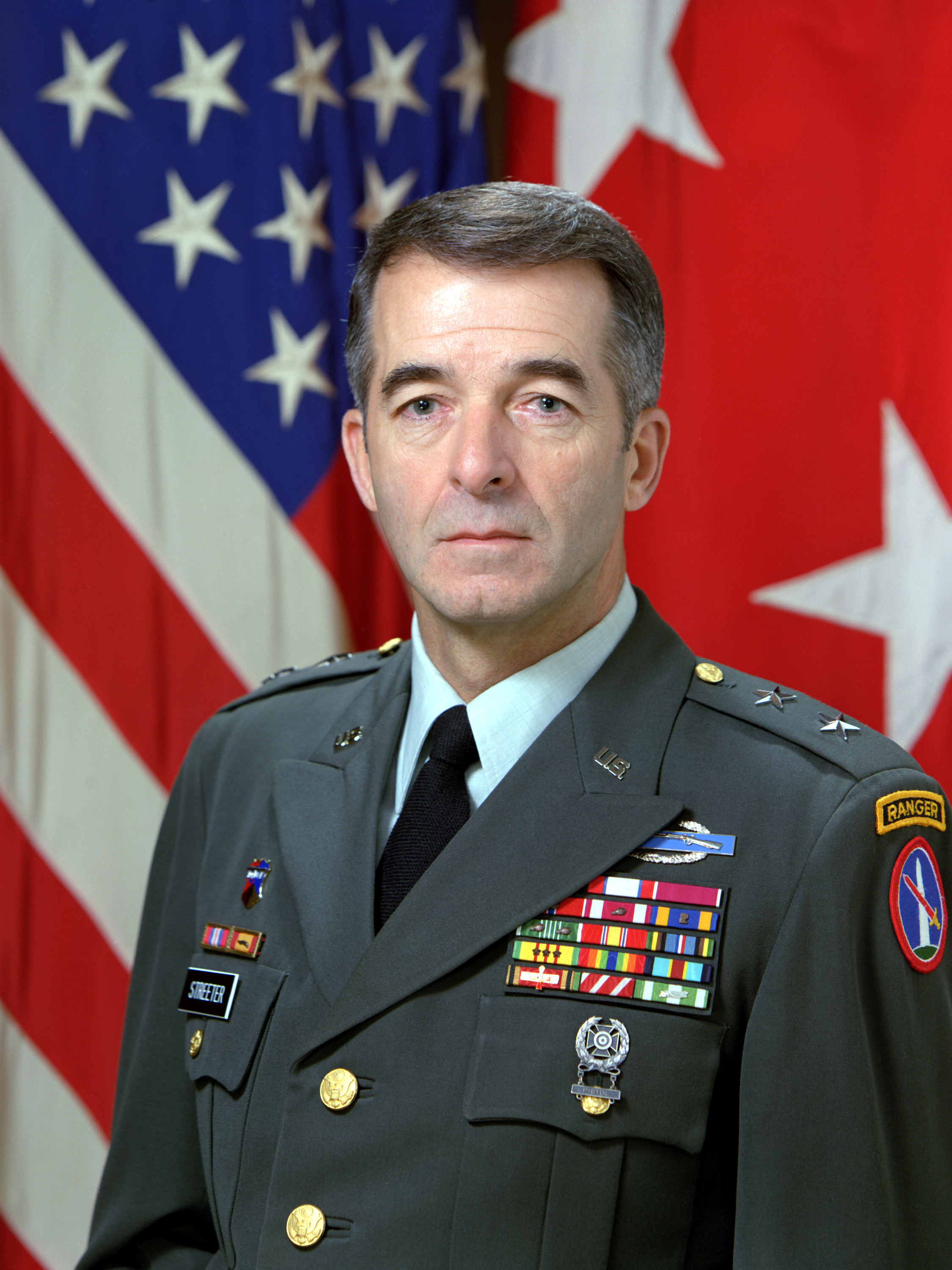
- Nickname: Bill
- Born: July 14, 1937 (age 88); Greenfield, Massachusetts, U.S.
- Allegiance: United States of America
- Branch: United States Army
- Service years: 1959–1993
- Rank: Major general
- Commands: 1st Cavalry Division; 2nd Brigade, 1st Cavalry Division; 1st Battalion, 66th Armor Regiment
- Conflicts: Vietnam War
- Awards: Distinguished Service Medal; Legion of Merit; Bronze Star Medal (2); Meritorious Service Medal (2); Air Medal (2)

William Frederick Streeter (born July 14, 1937) is a retired United States Army major general who served as Commanding General, 1st Cavalry Division from 1988 to 1990. He also commanded the U.S. Army Military District of Washington, coordinating military participation in the bicentennial celebration for the U.S. Constitution in 1990 and the first inauguration of Bill Clinton in 1993.

Streeter graduated from Norwich University in 1959 with a B.S. degree in business administration. He later earned an M.S. degree in public administration from Shippensburg State College while also studying at the nearby Army War College. He retired from active duty in 1993.
