= Stanton Babcock =

American equestrian

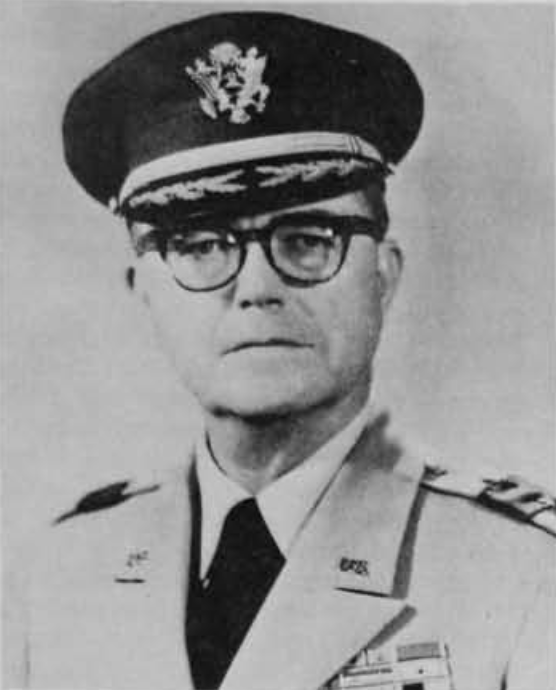

Personal information
- Full name: Conrad Stanton Babcock Jr.
- Born: January 12, 1904 Fort Leavenworth, Kansas, U.S.
- Died: March 10, 1979 (aged 75) Carmel-by-the-Sea, California, U.S.

Sport
- Sport: Equestrian

Conrad Stanton Babcock Jr. (January 12, 1904 – March 10, 1979) was an American equestrian. He competed in two events at the 1936 Summer Olympics. Babcock was also a Major General of the Army who commanded the 2nd Armored Division between April 1956 and June 1957.

== Family ==
He was the son of Brigadier General Conrad Stanton Babcock (1876-1950) who was buried at Arlington National Cemetery and the father of actress Barbara Babcock. He was married to Jadwiga Florence Noskowiak (1903-2000).

== Life ==
In 1925 Babock graduated from the United States Military Academy in West Point and was commissioned in the Cavalry. During the following 36 years he advanced through the ranks up to Major General. In 1941, he was assigned as military attache to the United States Ambassador in Japan. After the Attack on Pearl Harbor and the following involvement of the United States in World War II he was interned until being returned to the United States in late 1942. In 1944 Babcock belonged to the staff of the Joint Chiefs of Staff where he served on the strategic plans committee. In 1945 he took part in the Battle of Okinawa where he was wounded, and he was unable to participate in any military actions for the remainder of the war.

In 1950 Babcock served as one of the advisors of John Foster Dulles on the Japanese Peace Treaty negotiations. In the following years he held several positions as staff officer in various headquarters and military units. Between 1951 and 1954 he was attached to the United States Military Mission to United Nations. This was followed by an assignment to the staff of the 7th Infantry Division in South Korea. In 1955 he was assigned to the 2nd Armored Division in West Germany where he first served as Assistant division commander. Between April 1956 and June 1957 he commanded this division. His next assignment led him to France where he served as Chief of the Military Assistance Advisory Group. Between 1959 and 1960 Babcock commanded the VIII Corps. Finally he was assigned to the staff of the United States Mission to North Atlantic Treaty Organization (NATO) in Paris. There he was in charge of the Mutual Weapons Development Team. Babock retired in 1961.

Between 1961 and 1976 he worked in various functions for the Stanford Research Institute. Later he moved to Carmel-by-the-Sea in California. He died on 10 March 1979 in that city.
