= Paul Logasa Bogen =

Paul Logasa Bogen (March 15, 1915 – June 4, 1972) was an early proponent of the Army as nation builders. He was a United States Army soldier known for his work at the Defense Intelligence Agency, the Army War College and for General Westmoreland in Vietnam. He also innovated the use of helicopters for close combat support and planned security for Khrushchev's visit to the United States in 1959.

== Early life ==
Paul Logasa Bogen was born on March 15, 1915, to Dr. Louis Isaac Bogen and Jeanie Deanna Logasa in Lincoln, Nebraska. His mother was the sister of Charles Logasa and Hannah Logasa He was originally expected to be born on Saint Patrick's Day and was to be named Patrick. When he was born two days early his parents named him Paul instead.

Bogen attended the University of Nebraska from 1933 to 1937, originally majoring in Mechanical Engineering before switching to Speech Communications. He was a member of the Army ROTC program obtaining the rank of Cadet Captain and being elected Finance Office of Phalanx, the University's military honor fraternity. Here he met an Elizabeth Jane Herd, whom he would marry on May 16, 1942, at Fort Benning, Georgia, in the Post Chapel.

== Military service ==
Third US Army staff, Bogen left far rear

After graduation, Bogen was commissioned as a reserve officer in the Army and assigned the command of a CCC division in Louisiana. After the Nazi invasion of Poland, Bogen requested his reserve commission to be activated. Upon activation, he was assigned to the 2nd Armored Division as an assistant to then Colonel George S. Patton at Fort Benning, Georgia.

He served in World War II in the 6th Armored Division, first as a tank commander, then as a scout, and finally as the Assistant G-3, I&E, where he co-authored the official unit history. He saw combat from Normandy, Brittany, North France, the Ardennes, the Rhineland, and across Germany. He was among early American Army soldiers to meet up with the Russians near Mittweida, Germany along the Zschopau River on May 8, 1945.

=== Graduate education ===
After World War II, he left active duty and became an Army reserve lieutenant colonel. During this time, he pursued a doctorate in Speech Communications at Ohio State University with research in the nascent fields of educational radio and television. As he neared completion of his degree, the growing tensions between the United States and the Soviet Union led to the Army re-activating him.

When he returned from his tour of duty, he was disappointed to find that his faculty adviser at Ohio State had published his dissertation as his own work. He decided not to start over so he did not get his doctorate.

=== Korean War ===
From 1951 to 1954, during the Korean War, he was an instructor at the Command and General Staff College at Fort Leavenworth, Kansas where he revamped the curriculum, introduced modern pedagogical techniques, better training of instructors, and helped design Bell Hall. During this time, he served on the local School Board. In June 1954, he was assigned to Fort Richardson, Alaska, as Chief of Staff to the commander of Army forces in Alaska, General James F. Collins. In June 1957, he was assigned to Fort Knox, Kentucky, where he was a commanding officer of a battalion. In June 1958, he was awarded a Regular Army commission and promoted to the rank of colonel and sent to Carlisle, Pennsylvania to the U.S. Army War College as a student in Strategy and Logistics. Upon graduation, he became a professor at the War College. When the Defense Intelligence Agency (DIA) was established in 1961, Bogen was made the Assistant to the Director. During his time at the DIA, Bogen was assigned to be the chief of security for the visit of Nikita Khrushchev to the United States.

=== Vietnam War ===
From 1964 to 1965, Colonel Bogen served under General William Westmoreland as the head of the Army Concept Team in Vietnam and was an outspoken opponent of the Tactical Air Command System Report that favored consolidating all tactical air operations under the US Air Force. During his service in Vietnam, he received the Legion of Merit twice, a Bronze Star, and an Air Medal.

=== Return to War College ===
In 1966 after returning from Vietnam, Colonel Bogen was again a faculty member at the U.S. Army War College as the first recipient of the Eisenhower Chair of Strategic Appraisal During this time, he was recognized as one of the first professional soldiers to advocate the military as nation-builders.

=== 4th Army ===
In 1969, Bogen was transferred to Fort Sam Houston in San Antonio, Texas, where he served as the chief of staff of the 4th Army. Upon the merging of the 4th and 5th Armies in 1971, he was offered a promotion to brigadier general as commander of Schofield Barracks in Hawaii after being passed over at least four times for a promotion.

== Retirement ==
Colonel Bogen, however, decided he did not want to relocate again, particularly since his second oldest son had just started college and his youngest was in the middle of high school. Instead, he retired and began to write his memoirs. However, he died of anaphylactic shock from a hornet sting at his home in San Antonio in 1972. His youngest son, John, died in 2003, his oldest son, James, died in 2005, his wife, Elizabeth, died in 2009, his middle son, Charles, died in 2010 and his daughter, Patricia died in 2019. He was survived by 9 grandchildren.
