= George Windle Read Jr. =

US Army general (1900–1974)

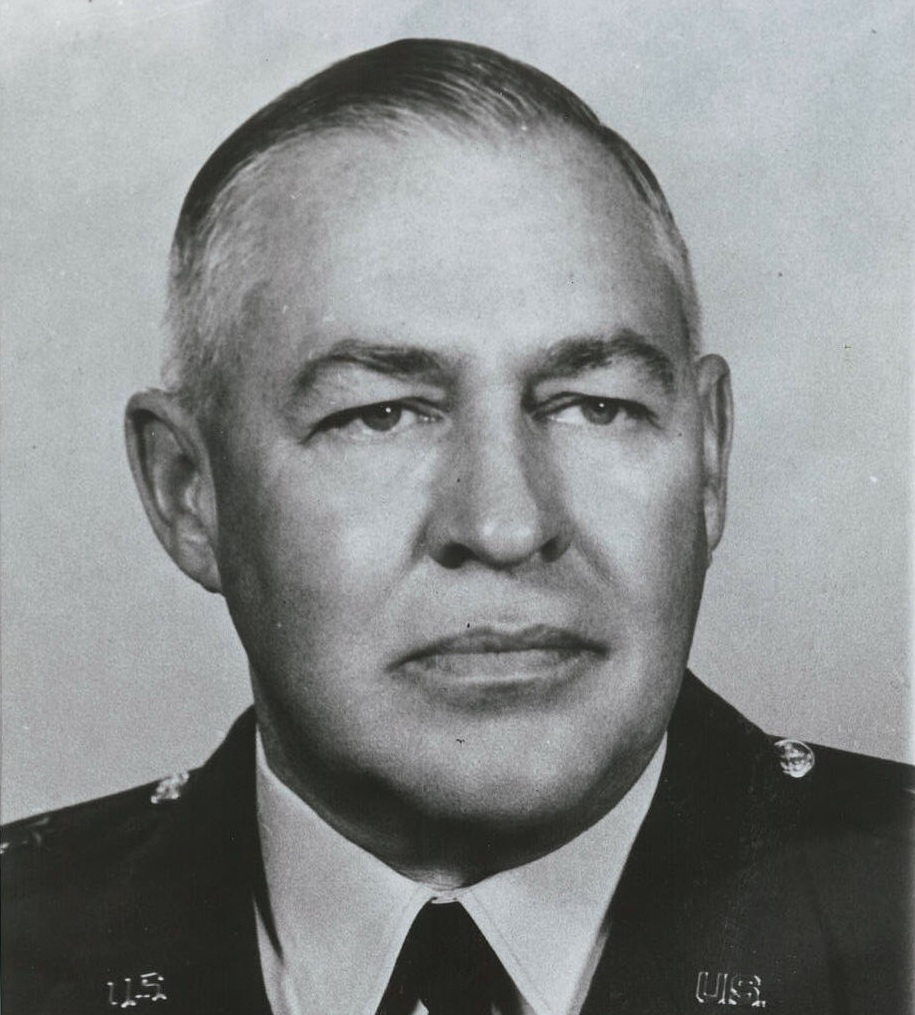
- Read as commander of Second United States Army, 1958
- Born: 29 July 1900; Fort Grant, Arizona, US
- Died: 15 December 1974 (aged 74) Fort Ord, California, US
- Buried: Arlington National Cemetery
- Allegiance: United States
- Branch: United States Army
- Service years: 1917–1960
- Rank: Lieutenant general
- Service number: 0-12603
- Commands: 68th Tank Regiment; Combat Command B, 6th Armored Division; 6th Armored Division; 1st Brigade, United States Constabulary; 2nd Armored Division; Allied Land Forces South East Europe; U.S. Army Armor Center and School; Second United States Army
- Conflicts: World War I World War II
- Awards: Distinguished Service Medal; Silver Star; Legion of Merit; Bronze Star; French Legion of Honor; French Croix de Guerre with Palm; Belgian Croix de Guerre; Greek Grand Cross of the Royal Order of the Phoenix

George Windle Read Jr. (29 July 1900 – 15 December 1974) was a lieutenant general in the United States Army. He was prominent as a top-tier polo player, a successful commander of World War II armor units, and the U.S. Army's Chief of Armor.

== Early life ==
Read was born at Fort Grant, Arizona, on 29 July 1900, the son of Burton Young Read and Major General George Windle Read (1860–1934), one of the top commanders in the American Expeditionary Force during World War I. His grandfather was Lieutenant General S.B.M. Young, who served as the first Chief of Staff of the United States Army. Read was educated on military posts throughout the United States, and graduated from Central High School in Washington, D.C.

Read was decided upon a military career from an early age; at 13, he took part in a summer Boy Scout encampment that included military training. In the late 1800s and early 1900s, Washington's high schools maintained a corps of cadets, with students organized into companies and regiments for drill and ceremony competitions. During his high school years, Read was an active participant as a member of the corps' Company H, 1st Regiment.

== World War I ==
Read enlisted in the Army on 15 May 1917, shortly before his seventeenth birthday. He served with the 15th Cavalry Regiment and the 30th and 42nd Infantry Divisions during World War I, attaining the rank of sergeant.

== Post World War I ==
Read completed the officer candidate school in Langres, France, and was commissioned as a second lieutenant of Infantry in 1919. He soon transferred to Cavalry, and graduated from the Cavalry School Basic Course in 1921.

He served throughout the United States and overseas during the 1920s and 1930s. From 1922 to 1925 Read served in the Philippines as aide de camp to his father.

A championship caliber polo player, Read took part in several tournaments during the 1920s and 1930s, playing on teams sponsored by the Army.

Read graduated from the Cavalry School Regular Course in 1937, afterwards serving in the Middle East as an observer in Palestine and a member of the Armored Force Board that was based in Cairo, Egypt.

== World War II ==
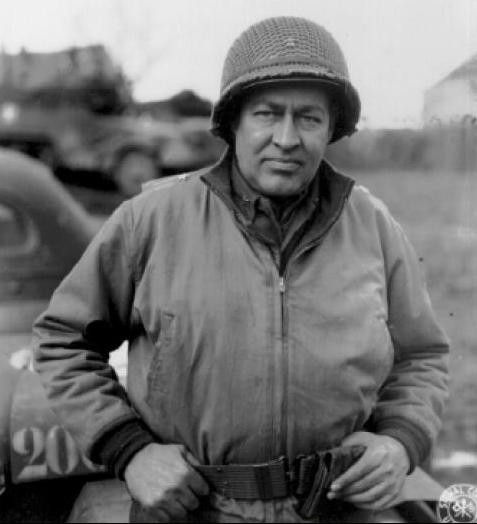
General Read with the 6th Armored Division in World War II

After graduating from the Command and General Staff College in 1941, Read was assigned as Training and Operations Officer, G-3, for the 6th Armored Division.

Read served with the 6th Armored Division in Europe throughout World War II, including assignments as commander of the 68th Tank Regiment, commander of the division's Combat Command B, assistant division commander, and division commander from April to May, 1945 and again from July until the division was deactivated in September, 1945.

== Post World War II ==
In the late 1940s Read served as President of Army Ground Forces Board 3 at Ft. Benning, Georgia. (The Army created several ground forces boards to test new weapons and equipment and make procurement recommendations.)

From 1948 to 1950 Read served as Deputy Chief of Staff for Logistics, G-4, for the United States Constabulary.

During the early 1950s General Read commanded 1st Brigade, United States Constabulary in West Germany.

From April 1952 to April 1953 Read served as commander of the 2nd Armored Division.

In 1953 Read was assigned as commander of the U.S. Army Armor Center and School at Fort Knox, Kentucky, where he remained until 1955.

He then commanded Allied Land Forces South East Europe, remaining in this post until 1957.

In 1957 Read assumed command of the Second United States Army, remaining in this position until his retirement in 1960.

== Awards and decorations ==
General Read's U.S. decorations included multiple awards of the Distinguished Service Medal, the Silver Star, and multiple awards of the Legion of Merit and Bronze Star Medal.

His foreign awards included the French Legion of Honor and Croix de Guerre with Palm, Belgian Croix de Guerre, Luxembourg War Cross, Greek Grand Cross of the Royal Order of the Phoenix, and Order of Merit (Chile).

== Retirement and death ==
General Read resided in Aptos, Santa Cruz County, California after his retirement from the Army, and died at Fort Ord's Silas B. Hays Army Hospital on 15 December 1974, from the effects of lymphocytic leukemia. He was buried at Arlington National Cemetery, Section 3, Site 3946.

== Family ==
In 1933, Read married Ernestine Eaton Renzel (1903–1988). They had no children.

Military offices
Preceded by Robert W. Grow	Commanding General 6th Armored Division; April–September 1945	Succeeded by Post deactivated
Preceded by Charles K. Gailey Jr.	Commanding General 2nd Armored Division; 1952–1953	Succeeded by Leander L. Doan
