= Robert W. Grow =

United States Army general

Robert Walker Grow
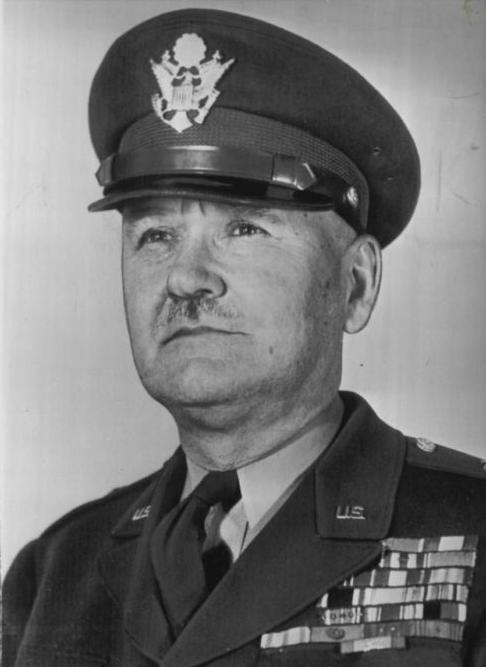
- Born: February 14, 1895; Sibley, Iowa, United States
- Died: November 3, 1985 (aged 90); Falls Church, Virginia, United States
- Burial place: Arlington National Cemetery, Virginia, United States
- Military career
- Allegiance: United States
- Branch: United States Army
- Service years: 1914–1951
- Rank: Major General
- Nickname: "Bob"
- Service number: 0-4621
- Units: Cavalry Branch; Field Artillery Branch
- Commands: 34th Armored Regiment; 6th Armored Division; 3rd Armored Division; 26th Infantry Division
- Conflicts: World War I World War II
- Awards: Distinguished Service Cross; Army Distinguished Service Medal; Legion of Merit; Silver Star; Bronze Star

Major General Robert Walker Grow (February 14, 1895 – November 3, 1985) was a senior United States Army officer who commanded the 6th Armored Division during World War II. He was notable for his court-martial in 1951 for failing to safeguard classified information.

== Early life and military career ==
Born in Sibley, Iowa to Nellie (née Walker) and John Thomas Grow. His mother died when he was two years old and Grow went to live with his paternal grandparents, as his father went to Canada to work. He graduated from the University of Minnesota in 1916. He married Mary Louella Marshall (1896–1974), daughter of Willamina H. "Willie" (née Robertson) and J Walter Marshall, of Cleveland, Tennessee on November 5, 1917, in Hamilton, Tennessee. They had two sons, Robert Marshall and Walter Thomas, both attendees of the United States Military Academy at West Point, New York. They had an additional child die as a one-day-old in Brownsville, Texas.

Grow joined the Minnesota National Guard in February 1914, whilst attending the University of Minnesota, and was commissioned as an officer in November 1915. On December 5, 1916, he was promoted to first lieutenant. April 1917 saw the American entry into World War I and Grow was promoted again, this time to captain, in the National Army on August 5, 1917. On October 12, he transferred to the Regular Army but retained his captain rank. Grow did not see active service during World War I.

He remained in the army during the interwar period, attending both the United States Army Command and General Staff College and the United States Army War College.

Robert W. Grow was the commander the 6th Armored Division on the Western Front, fighting during the battles of Normandy and of the Bulge.

His command of the 6th Armored Division in its rapid assault across the Brittany Peninsula is considered one of the finest examples of armor in the exploitation phase. This stunning advance is often overlooked due to the more glamorous exploits of the rest of the U.S. Army surrounding the German Seventh Army at the same time.

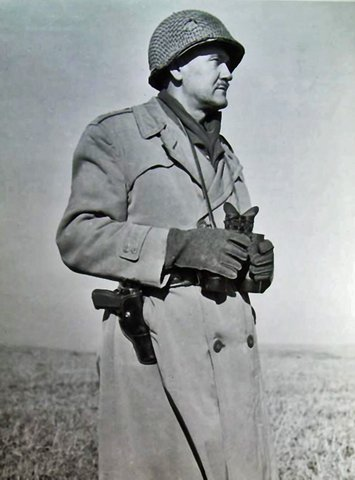
Major General Robert W. Grow in the field.

== After the war ==
He is also known for being court-martialed in 1951 during the Cold War on charges of failing to safeguard classified information. At the time, he was the senior U.S. military attache in Moscow, and portions of his diary fell into Soviet hands and were published in part by Richard Squires, a British defector to East Germany. Grow retired after the court-martial and later became an executive of the Falls Church, Virginia chamber of commerce. He was reprimanded and suspended from command for six months. Only after the trial did the public discover that many of the sentiments that Squires attributed to Grow were forgeries. The case was appealed and ultimately came before President Eisenhower in 1957, who approved the findings but remitted the sentence. "Spymaster," by ex-CIA official Tennant Bagley, gives an updated account of the affair of the diary by a Soviet intelligence agent.

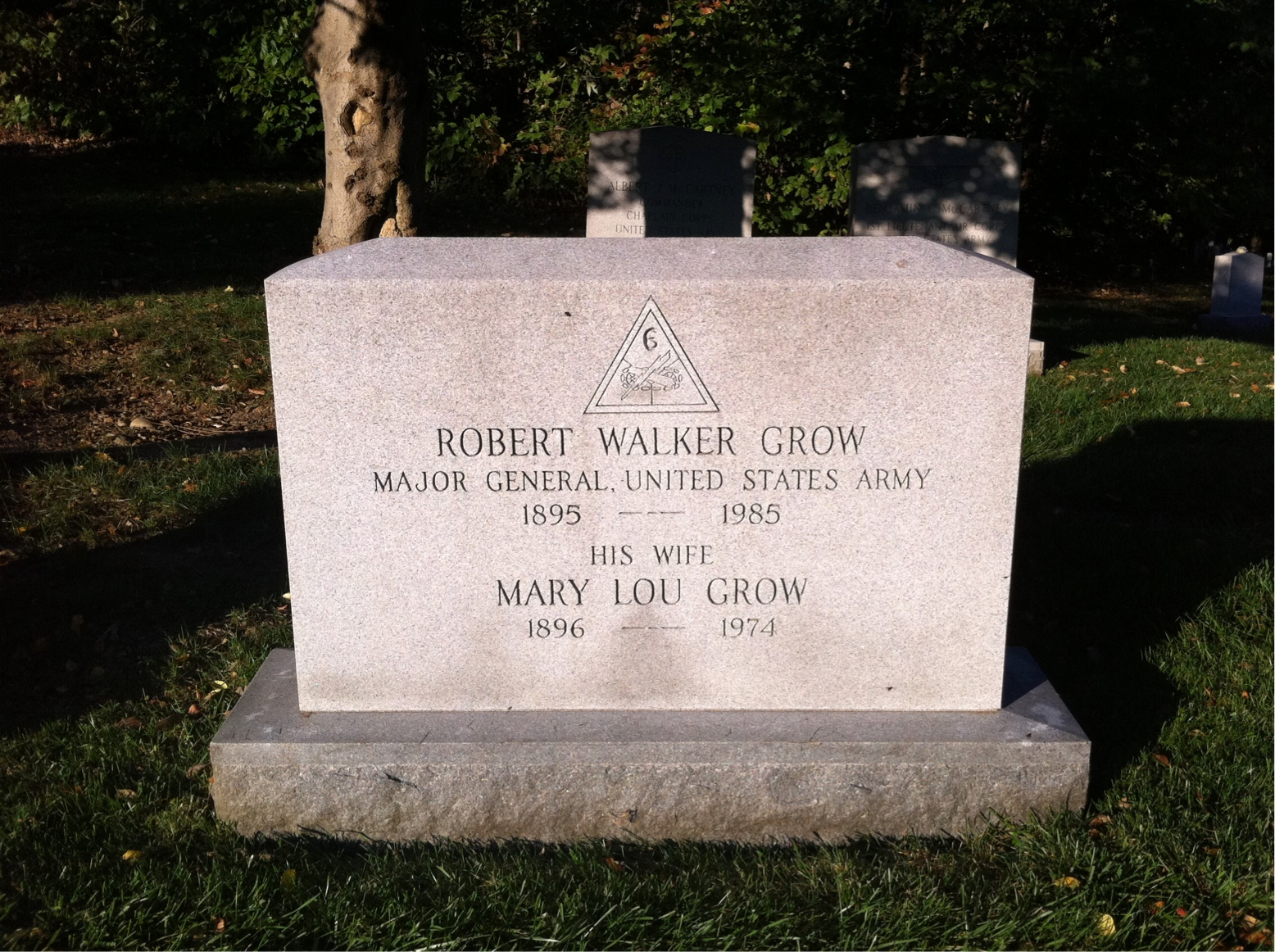
The grave of Major General Robert Walker Grow at Arlington National Cemetery.

Not long after the court-martial, his son, Walter Thomas Grow, was on summer vacation from the United States Military Academy at West Point in 1953 when a fire started in his bedroom of the family home in Falls Church, Virginia. Walter Thomas Grow, 21, died of smoke inhalation on August 12, 1953.

Military offices
Preceded by William H. H. Morris Jr.	Commanding General 6th Armored Division; 1943–1945	Succeeded by George W. Read Jr.
Preceded by Frank A. Allen Jr.	Commanding General 3rd Armored Division; July–November 1945	Succeeded by Post deactivated
Preceded by Stanley Eric Reinhart	Commanding General 26th Infantry Division; November–December 1945	Succeeded by Post deactivated
