= 1st Battalion, 68th Armor Regiment =

- Active: 16 January 1996–present
- Country: USA
- Branch: Regular Army
- Type: Armor
- Garrison/HQ: Fort Carson
- Nickname: Silver Lions
- Mottos: "Fight Like Hell", "With Great Speed"

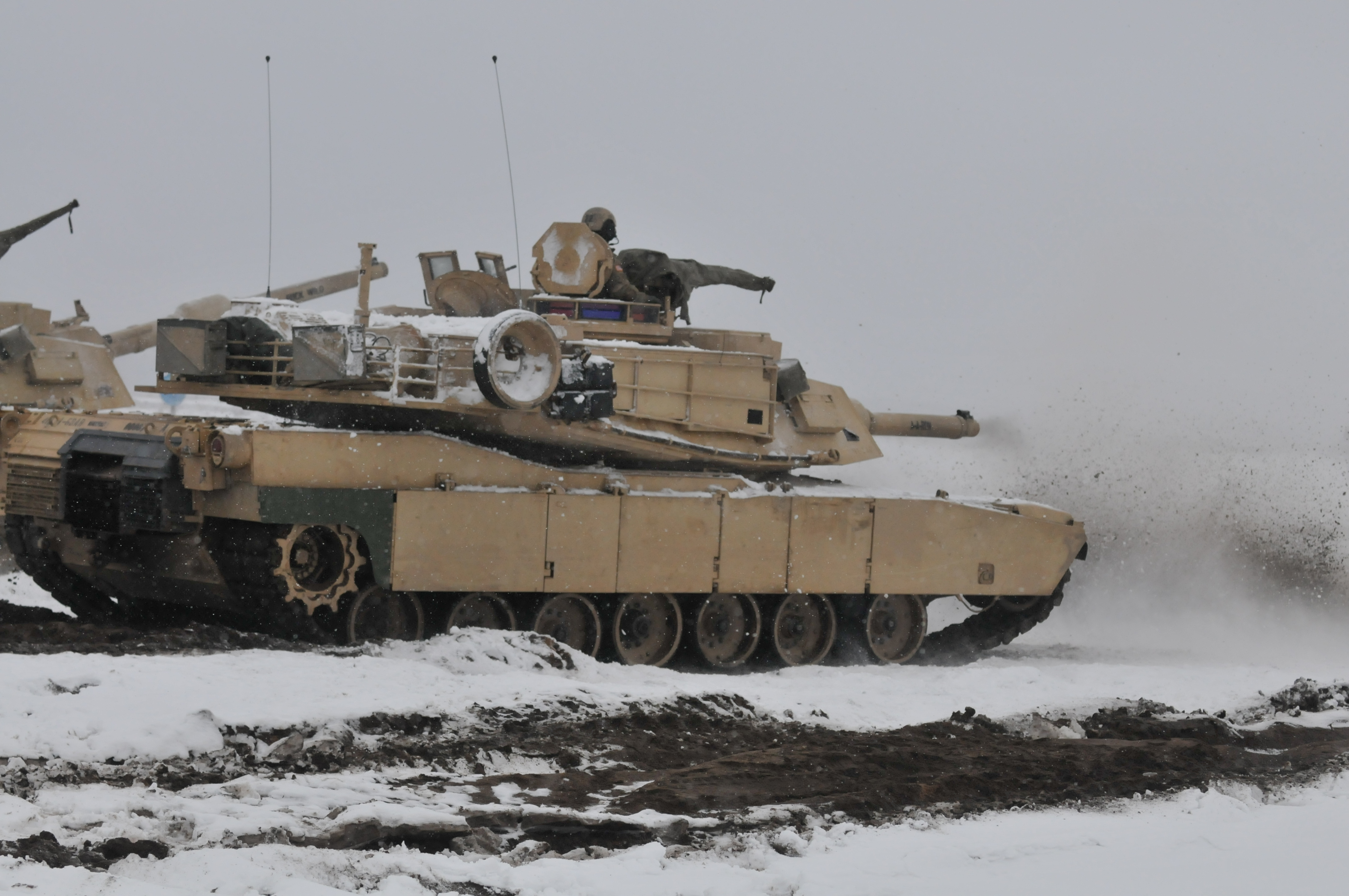
1-68th Armor, 4th ID conducts live-fire certification with their M1A2 Abrams in Poland, circa 2017

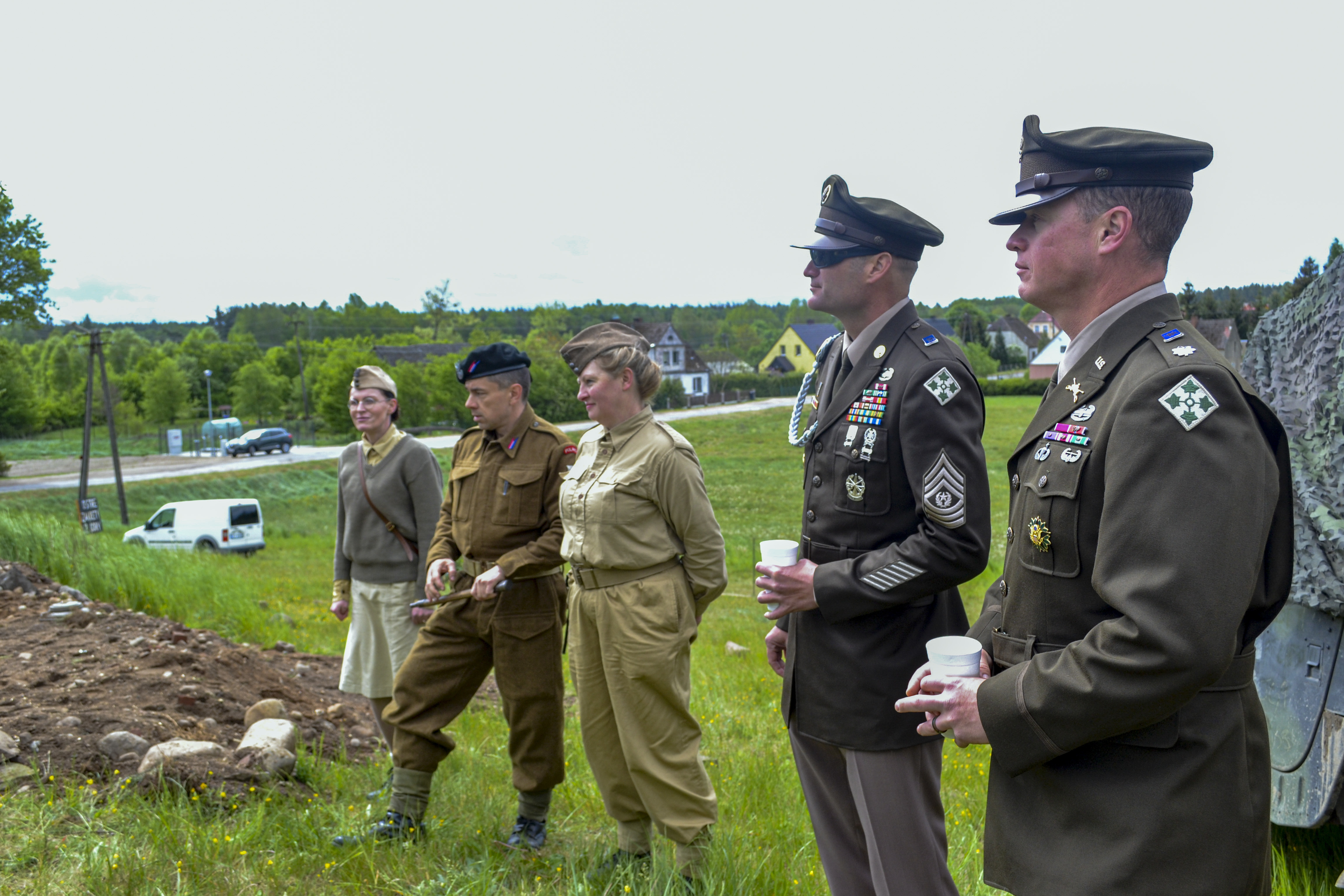
LTC Bies and CSM Kurtzhals watch a Battle of Monte Cassino reenactment near Drawsko Pormorski, Poland in 2022.

The 1st Battalion, 68th Armor Regiment (1–68 Armor) is a battalion of the 68th Armor Regiment, United States Army.

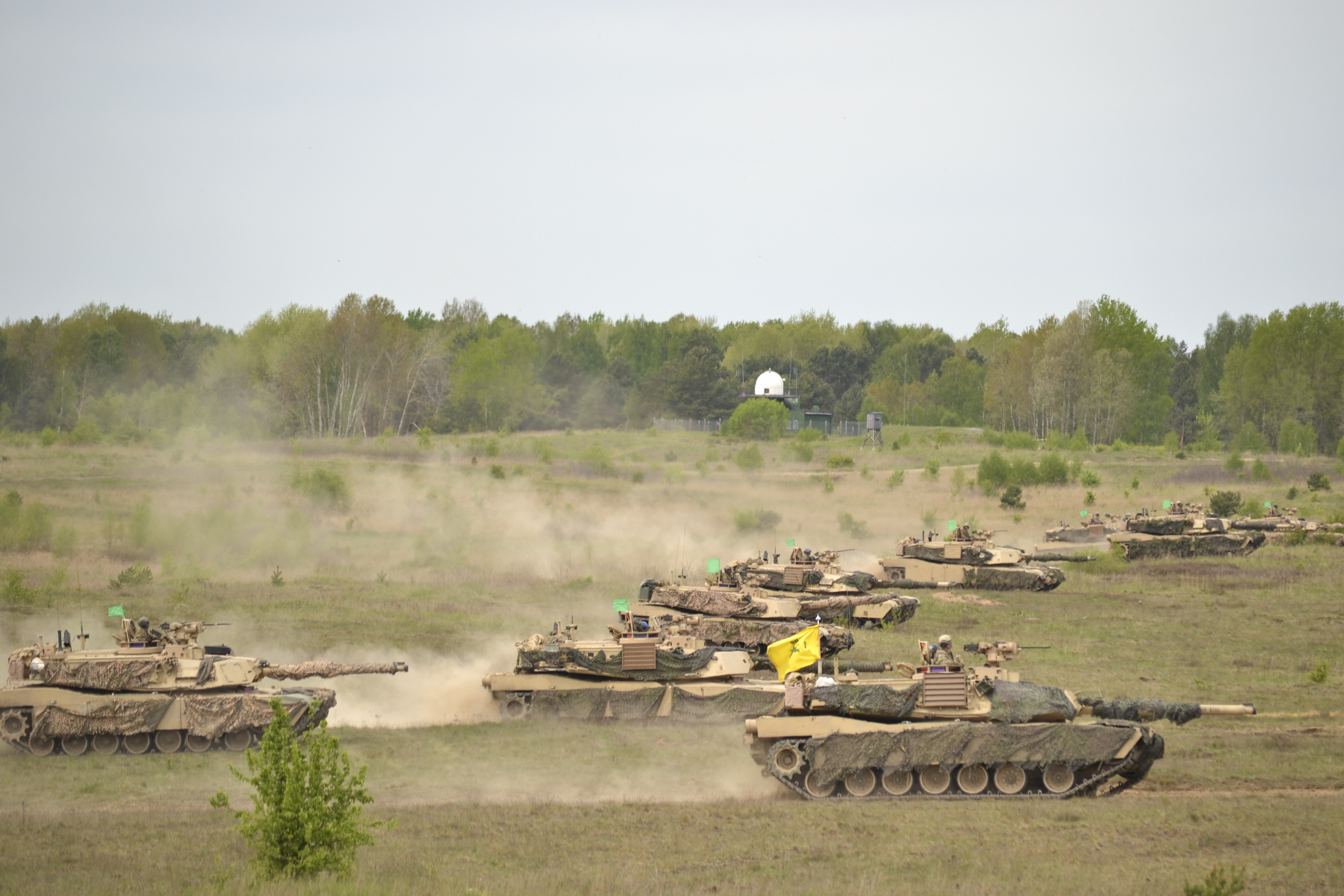
68th Armor Regiments tanks conducting an attack in Poland during a multinational live fire exercise, 2022.

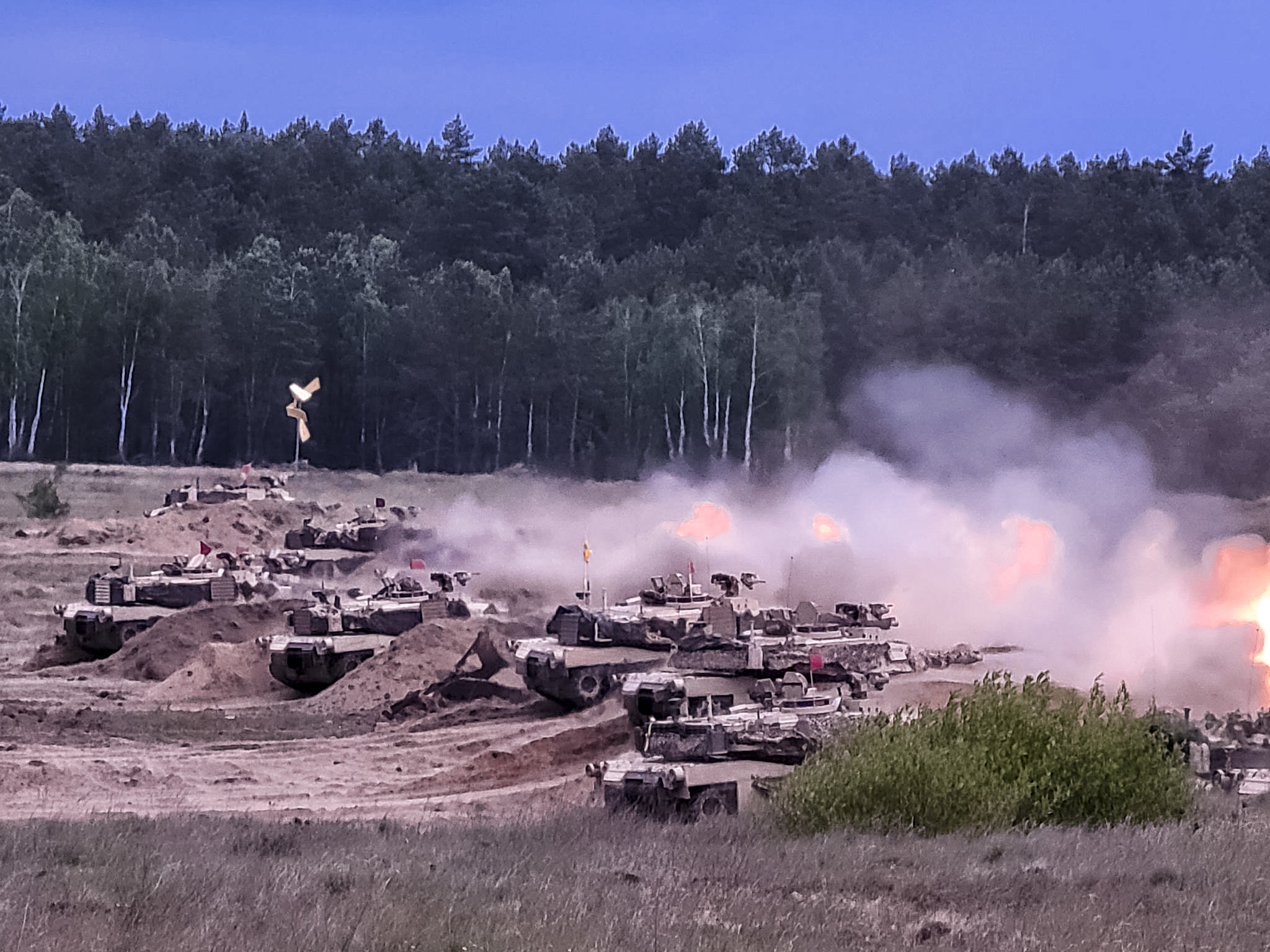
The Silver Lions stop the enemy advance cold with "shock effect", circa 2022.

== Operation Iraqi Freedom ==
Upon return from deployment to Operation Iraqi Freedom (OIF) 1, the 4th Infantry Division immediately began reorganization into the "modular brigade" structure of the new US Army. The 4th Infantry Division was again deployed to OIF in late 2005, replacing 3rd Infantry Division in Baghdad. The 3rd Brigade was attached to the 101st Airborne Division and the 1–68 was sent to Baqubah, Iraq. Before recent deployment, it was commanded by Lieutenant Colonel George S Dotson.

The 1st Battalion, 68th Armor Regiment was deployed in support of Operation Iraqi Freedom from 1 December 2007 to 1 March 2009. Alpha Company was sent to FOB Prosperity attached to 3-29 FA manning coalition checkpoints in central Baghdad's International Zone. Headquarters and Headquarter Company (HHC) was set in at COP Callahan, a converted shopping mall. COP Callahan also housed Delta, Echo, and Fox Companies while Charlie Company occupied COP Ford. At the end of February Alpha Company rejoined the battalion and was sent to JSS Ur. Alpha Company along with elements of 4/64, 3 ID began conducting combat patrols in the Hy Ur and Sadr City districts as a mechanized infantry company. On 8 July members of the Jaysha Madi and Hezbollah successfully deployed 10 Improvised Rocket Assisted Mortars directed at Alpha Company at JSS Ur. 9 of the 10 IRAMs exploded inside the JSS, destroying the Aerostat Balloon which had coverage over most important routes and checkpoints in the area. Alpha company was then sent to FOB Apache(Gunner's Palace) while 3rd Platoon Alpha company was detached to Delta company for the remainder of the deployment and sent to JSS Shaab. COP Callahan was abandoned for COP Bastintine at the end of 2008. All 1-68 soldiers returned to Ft. Carson, CO by the end of March 2009 being relieved by the 1st Cavalry Division.

After being reorganized, the 1st Battalion, 68th Armor Regiment became known as the 1st Combined Arms Battalion, 68th Armor Regiment. HHC became known as Havoc with scouts, snipers, mortars and medics and staff positions. Alpha company, known as Attack, and Bravo, known as Blackhawk, were designated as infantry companies with M2A3 Bradley infantry fighting vehicles. Charlie company, known as Steel, and Delta, known as Destroyer, were set up as tank companies with 14 M1A2 Main Battle Tanks each. Echo company, known as Exile, became an engineering company. Foxtrot company, known as Forerunner, was attached from 64th Brigade Support Battalion to provide dining facility (DFAC), maintenance/recovery and a supply distribution platoon. The final company is Golf Company which is the rear-detachment company for the battalion when deployed.

== OIF 6 ==
1–68 Armor deployed to Iraq as part of operation new dawn throughout southern Iraq with a detachment company assigned to 4–10. Taskforce blackjack is in Al Assad, containing Destroyer Company, 1–68 in an advise and assist training role for the Iraqi army

== Unit awards ==
Valorous Unit Award for dates of service 1 Dec 2005 - 4 Nov 2006.

This award is gifted to those who perform extraordinary heroism in action against an armed enemy.

During the period 1 December 2005 to 4 November 2006, Headquarters and Headquarters Company, 1st Battalion, 68th Armored Regiment and its subordinate units displayed extraordinary heroism in action against an armed enemy in support of Operation Iraqi Freedom. In the face of constant life- threatening enemy actions throughout Diyala Province including, Baqubah, Khalis, Narwan and Khan Bani Saad, the unit demonstrated unwavering courage and determination in securing the people of Iraq by neutralizing the insurgency, training Iraqi security forces, and by improving local governance, infrastructure, and economy. Headquarters and Headquarters Company, 1st Battalion, 68th Armored Regiment's outstanding performance of duty is in keeping with the finest traditions of military service and reflects great credit upon the unit, 3d Heavy Brigade Combat Team, 4th Infantry Division, and the United States Army,

Valorous Unit Award for dates of service 3 Dec 2007 - 1 Mar 2009.

For extraordinary heroism in action against an armed enemy. During the period 3 December 2007 to 1 March 2009, Headquarters and Headquarters Company, 1st Battalion, 68th Armored Regiment and its subordinate units displayed extraordinary heroism in action against an armed enemy while in support of Operation Iraqi Freedom in Baghdad and Sadr City. The unit demonstrated the ability to innovate and adapt to accomplish their mission beyond the call of duty. The unit's ability to, fight and win on any ground against multiple enemies in a complex environment while simultaneously enabling local government and coalition forces represents an outstanding effort. Headquarters and Headquarters Company, 1st Battalion, 68th Armored Regiment's outstanding performance of duty is in keeping with the finest traditions of military service and reflects distinct credit upon the unit, the Multi-National Division-Baghdad, and the United States Army.

Headquarters and Headquarters Company, 3d Brigade Combat Team, 4th Infantry Division (to include: 3d Battalion, 29th Field Artillery Regiment; 4th Squadron, 10th Cavalry Regiment; 1st Battalion, 8th Infantry Regiment; 1st Battalion, 66th Armored Regiment; 588th Engineer Battalion; 1st Battalion, 68th Armored Regiment; 64th Support Battalion) ASUA 4 Jan 17 to 15 Oct 17

2d Battalion, 17th Field Artillery Regiment (to include: Company A, 52d Infantry Regiment; Troop C, 1st Squadron, 126th Cavalry Regiment; Troop A, 8th Squadron, 1st Cavalry Regiment (Less Detachment); Detachment, Troop B, 8th Squadron, 1st Cavalry Regiment; Detachment, Headquarters and Headquarters Company, 2d Brigade Combat Team, 2d Infantry Division [Stability Transition Team, Team 20 (Provisional)]; Detachment, 1st Battalion, 68th Armored Regiment [Security Force Assistance Advisory Team, Team 35 (Provisional)] VUA 15 April 12 to 9 Jan 13

3d Brigade, 4th Infantry Division, HHC (to include:1st battalion, 8th Infantry; 1st Battalion, 68th Armor; 3d Battalion, 29th Field Artillery; 4th Engineer Battalion; company C, 64th Support Battalion; Battery A, 2d Battalion, 20th Field Artillery; 85th Medical Detachment; Troop B, 9th Cavalry; Company B, 1st battalion, 101st Aviation; 915th Medical Detachment; Company B, 704th support Battalion; 1st Battalion, 12th Infantry Regiment; 534th signal company; Detachment, 418th Civil Affairs Battalion; Detachment, 443d Civil Affairs Battalion; Detachment, Company C, 104th Military intelligence battalion; Detachment, Company D, 104th Military Intelligence Battalion; 3d Platoon, 46th Chemical company; Detachment, 519th Military Intelligence Battalion; Detachment, 610th Engineer Detachment) VUA 20 Apr 03 to 22 Mar 04

1st Battalion, 68th Armored Regiment, HHC (to include: Company A, 1st Battalion, 68th Armored Regiment; Company B, 1st Battalion, 68th Armored Regiment; Company C, 1st Battalion, 68th Armored Regiment; Company D, 1st Battalion, 68th Armored Regiment; Company E, 1st Battalion, 68th Armored Regiment; Company F, 64th Support Battalion ) VUA 1 Dec 05 to 4 Nov 06

1st Battalion, 68th Armored Regiment, HHC (to include: Company A, 1st Battalion, 68th Armored Regiment; Company B, 1st Battalion, 68th Armored Regiment; Company C, 1st Battalion, 68th Armored Regiment; Company D, 1st Battalion, 68th Armored Regiment; Company E, 1st Battalion, 68th Armored Regiment; Company F, 64th Support Battalion) VUA 3 Dec 07 to 1 Mar 09

2d Battalion, 17th Field Artillery Regiment (to include: Company A, 52d Infantry Regiment; Troop C, 1st Squadron, 126th Cavalry Regiment; Troop A, 8th Squadron, 1st Cavalry Regiment (Less Detachment); Detachment, Troop B, 8th Squadron, 1st Cavalry Regiment; Detachment, Headquarters and Headquarters Company, 2d Brigade Combat Team, 2d Infantry Division [Stability Transition Team, Team 20 (Provisional)]; Detachment, 1st Battalion, 68th Armored Regiment [Security Force Assistance Advisory Team, Team 35 (Provisional)] VUA 15 April 12 to 9 Jan 13

3d Brigade Combat Team, 4th Infantry Division, HQ (to include: 1st Battalion, 8th Infantry Regiment; 1st Battalion, 68th Armored Regiment; 4th Squadron, 10th Cavalry Regiment; 3d Battalion, 29th Field Artillery Regiment; 64th Support Battalion; Special Troops Battalion, 3d Brigade Combat Team, 4th Infantry Division; 422d Military Police Company) MUC 21 Mar 10 to 10 Mar 11

== Previous Commanders ==
2007-2009: LTC Michael Pappal

2011-2013: LTC Scott Taylor

2013-2015: LTC Jeremy Wilson

2015-2017: LTC Stephen Capehart

2017-2019: LTC Jon Kluck

2019-2021: LTC Michael Erlandson

2021-2023: LTC Charles Bies

2023-Current: LTC Michael Hebert
