= Study hall =

Place during school day for study

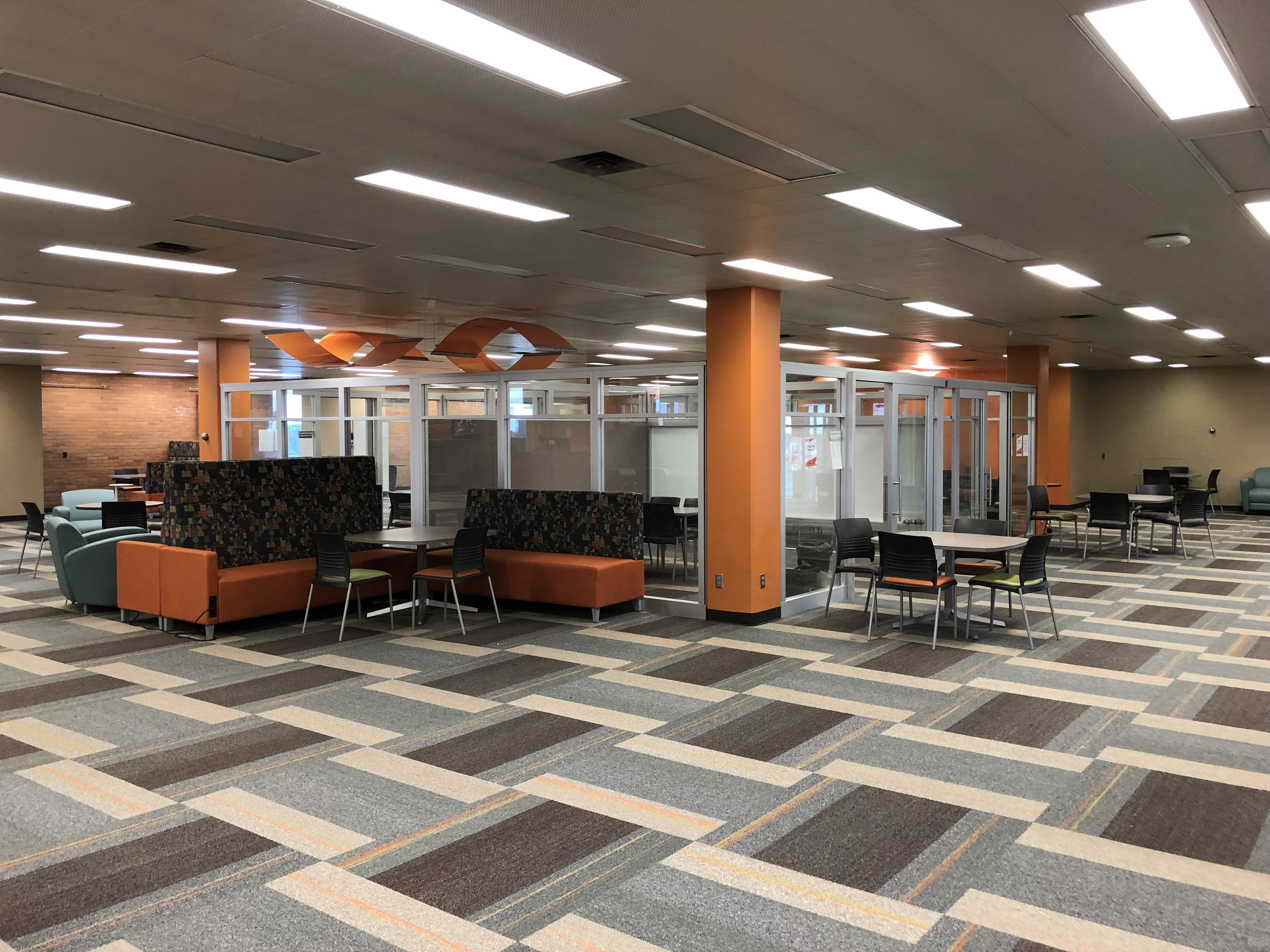
A group study area in a university.

Study hall, known as private study, SAS, structured study or free periods in the United Kingdom, is a term for a place to have a study time during the school day where students are assigned to study when they are not scheduled for an academic class. They are most commonly found in high schools and some middle schools, especially in the United States. In colleges, such a place may be called a student lounge. It is not to be confused with studying in a hallway.

== Description ==
Study halls generally have assigned rooms and are monitored by teachers or teacher's aides, who often encourage students to use this time to complete homework, catch up on missing assignments, or study for tests or quizzes. Sometimes, students also use study halls to converse, make phone calls, text messages, play video games, or otherwise socialize or pursue non-academic topics, though this is sometimes discouraged or forbidden. Periods in which such things are allowed are occasionally differentiated from study halls by the name "free period". Some students even eat lunch during a study hall due to long lines and short lunch periods at their schools.

Study halls are often used by students to visit with teachers, who have a "prep period", in order to discuss work or assignments. A study hall can be a period to utilize school resources or otherwise request teacher assistance in any subject not understood by the student.

Academics, such as school principal Jeff Gilbert, feel that study hall is an inefficient allocation of time which is often underutilized, but others say it is a positive addition to a regular schedule because it creates a good environment for completing homework or large projects.

== History ==
The word 'study hall' was first attested as early as 1813.

In 1835, at Maynooth College in Ireland, the corridors were so cold in the winter that Study-hall was preferred by students even with their strict silence policy.

A 1938 examination by Hannah Logasa on the use of study hall concluded that students did not use the time for studying, and that the primary purpose of the period was to permit school administrators to carry out a more orderly organized school day.

A 1966 study reported that students who spent additional time at home working on homework achieved higher grades than students who spent more time in study hall.
