= 6th Armored Division (United States) =

WW2 US Army formation

- 6th Armored Division shoulder sleeve insignia
- Active: 15 February 1942–18 September 1945; 5 September 1950–16 March 1956
- Country: United States
- Branch: United States Army
- Role: Armor
- Size: Division
- Part of: Third Army
- Garrison/HQ: Camp Chaffee
- Nickname: "Super Sixth"
- Engagements: World War II; Normandy; Northern France; Rhineland; Ardennes-Alsace; Central Europe

Commanders
- Notable commanders: MG William H. H. Morris; MG Robert W. Grow; BG George W. Read Jr.

Insignia
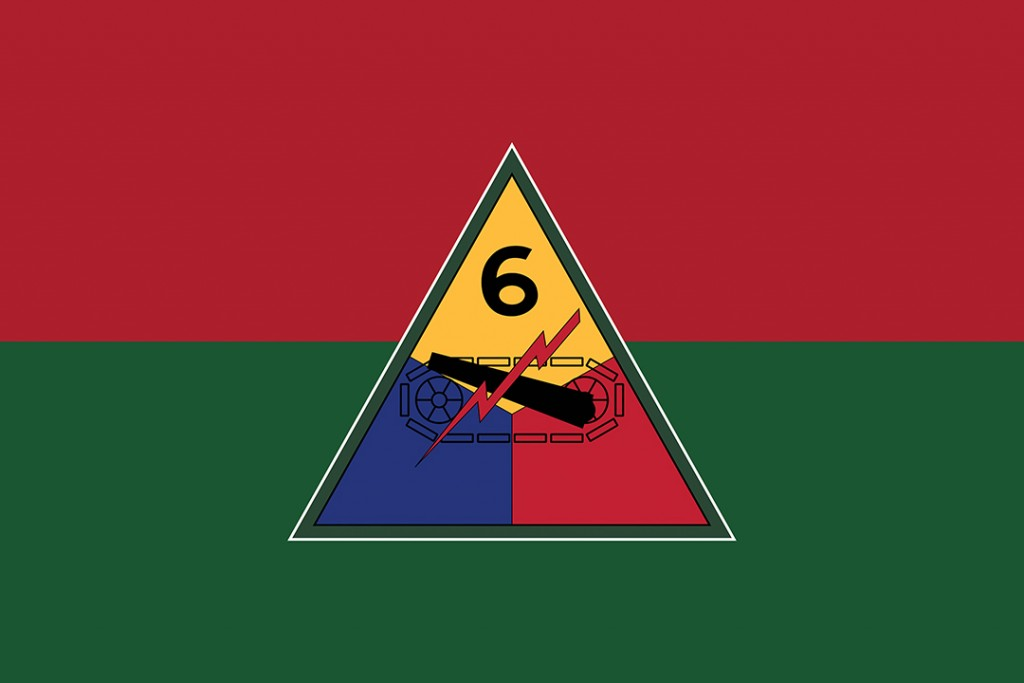
- Flag of the United States Army 6th Armored Division

The 6th Armored Division ("Super Sixth") was an armored division of the United States Army during World War II. It was formed with a cadre from the 2nd Armored Division.

== History ==
=== Training ===
The 6th Armored Division was activated in the Army of the United States on 15 February 1942 at Fort Knox, Kentucky. The major elements of the division originally were the 68th and 69th Armored Regiments and the 50th Armored Infantry Regiment; the 68th Armored Regiment had originally been part of the 1st Armored Division, while the 69th Armored Regiment had been part of the 2nd Armored Division. Brigadier General William H. H. Morris, Jr. was its first commander. It moved to Camp Chaffee on 15 March 1942 to make way for other Armored units, and then completed its assembly and unit training. The division then participated in the VIII Corps Louisiana Maneuvers from 25 August 1942, and then returned to Camp Chaffee on 21 September 1942. The 6th AD then moved to Camp Young at the Desert Training Center on 10 October 1942, and participated in the first California Maneuvers.

=== Reorganization ===
The 6th AD then moved to Camp Cooke to continue its training, where it was reorganized in September 1943, losing its "heavy" organization of two armored regiments and one armored infantry regiment in favor of a "light" organization of three tank battalions and three armored infantry battalions. Maj. Gen. Robert W. Grow assumed command of the Division at Camp Cooke, California on 31 May 1943 and commanded the division through the war until 30 July 1945. The 6th AD then staged at Camp Shanks, New York on 3 February 1944, departed the New York Port of Embarkation on 11 February 1944, and arrived in England on 23 February 1944.

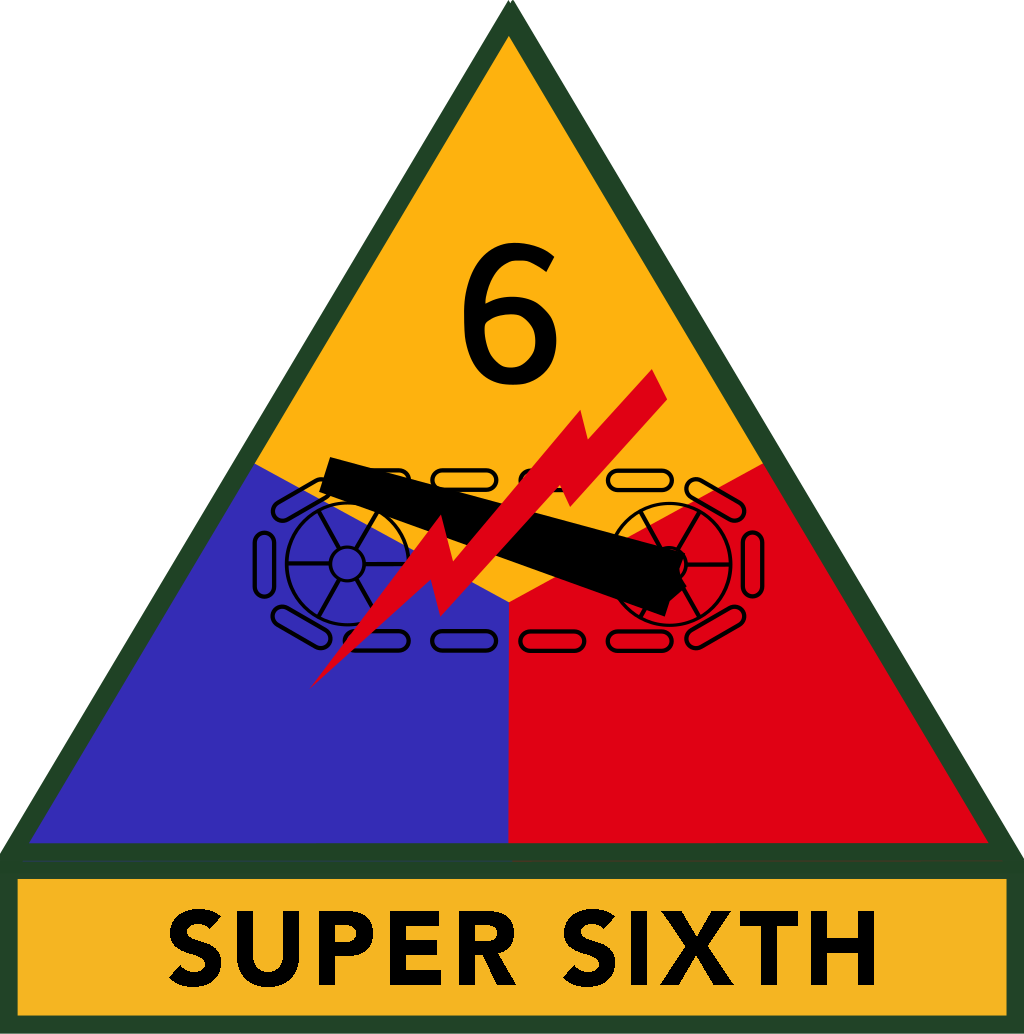
6th Armored Division "Super Sixth" insignia

After continuing its training for five months in Gloucestershire, England, the 6th AD landed on Utah Beach in Normandy on 18 July 1944 as a follow-on unit, and went on the offensive as separate combat commands in the Cotentin Peninsula in support of the Normandy Campaign.

=== Division organization ===
==== Heavy armored division ====
The division was activated as a heavy armored division in 1942. At the time the 6th Armored Division was composed of the following units:

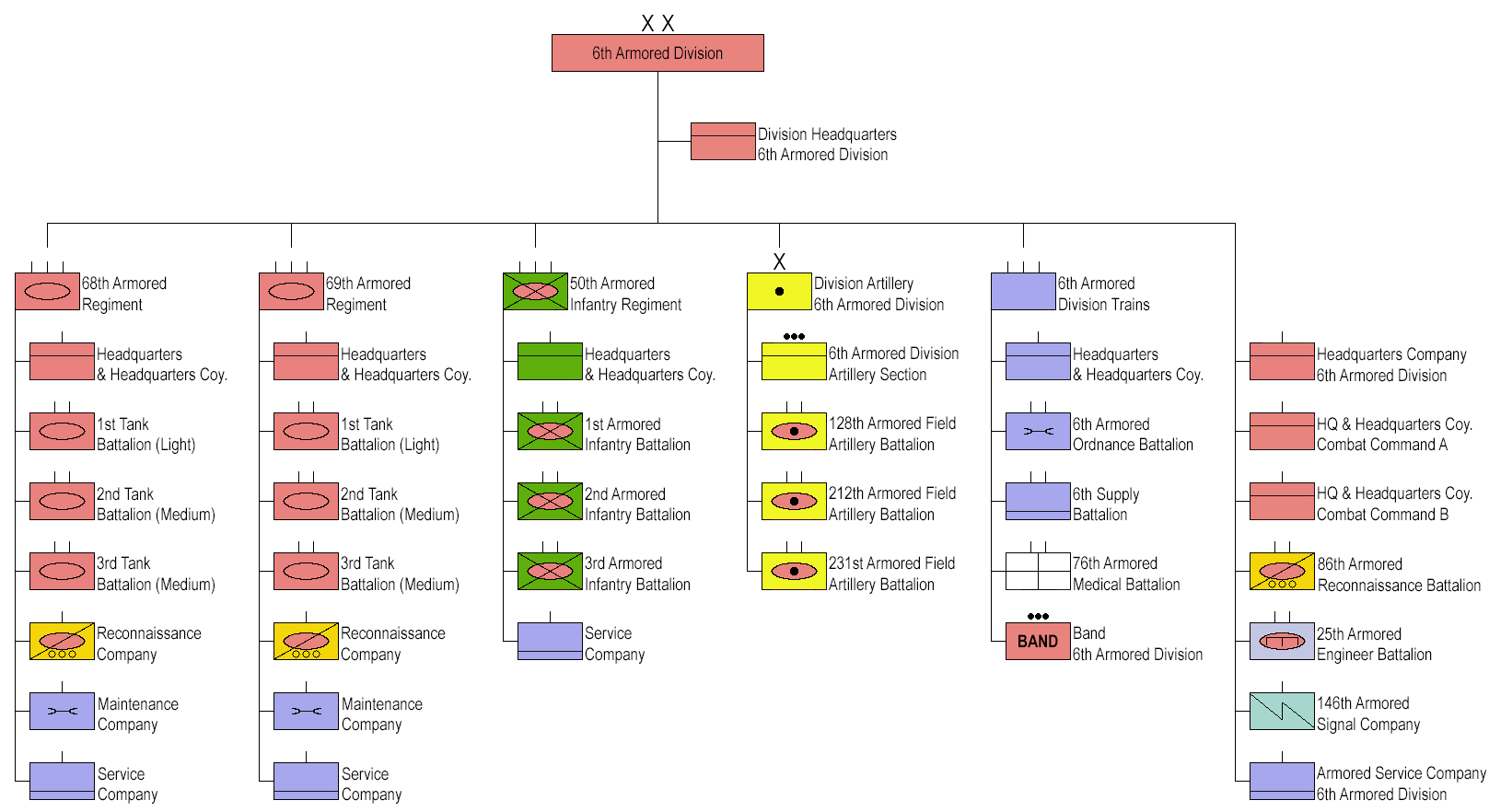
6th Armored Division organization after the division's activation (click to enlarge)

- 6th Armored Division
  - Division Headquarters
  - Headquarters Company, 6th Armored Division
  - Headquarters and Headquarters Company, Combat Command A
  - Headquarters and Headquarters Company, Combat Command B
  - 146th Armored Signal Company
  - Armored Service Company (includes the division's Military Police Platoon)
  - 68th Armored Regiment (transferred from the 2nd Armored Division)
    - Headquarters and Headquarters Company
    - Reconnaissance Company (M3 scout cars and T30 HMC self propelled guns)
    - Maintenance Company
    - Service Company
    - 1st Tank Battalion (Light)
      - Headquarters and Headquarters Company
      - 3× Light Tank companies (A, B, C) (M3/M5 Stuart light tanks)
    - 2nd Tank Battalion (Medium)
      - Headquarters and Headquarters Company
      - 3× Medium Tank companies (D, E, F) (M4 Sherman tanks)
    - 3rd Tank Battalion (Medium)
      - Headquarters and Headquarters Company
      - 3× Medium Tank companies (G, H, I) (M4 Sherman tanks)
  - 69th Armored Regiment (transferred from the 1st Armored Division)
    - same organization as 68th Armored Regiment
  - 50th Armored Infantry Regiment
    - Headquarters and Headquarters Company
    - 3× Armored infantry battalions
      - each battalion consists of: 1× Headquarters and Headquarters Company, 3× Rifle companies on M3 half-tracks
    - Service Company
  - 86th Armored Reconnaissance Battalion
    - Headquarters and Headquarters Company
    - 3× Reconnaissance companies (M3 scout cars)
    - Light Tank Company (M3/M5 Stuart)
  - 25th Armored Engineer Battalion
    - Headquarters and Headquarters Company
    - 4× Armored engineer companies
    - Bridge Company
  - 6th Armored Division Artillery
    - 6th Armored Division Artillery Section
    - 128th Armored Field Artillery Battalion
      - Headquarters and Headquarters Battery
      - 3× Field artillery batteries (M7 Priest self propelled howitzers)
      - Service Company
    - 212th Armored Field Artillery Battalion
      - same organization as 128th Armored Field Artillery Battalion
    - 231st Armored Field Artillery Battalion
      - same organization as 128th Armored Field Artillery Battalion
  - 6th Armored Division Trains
    - Headquarters and Headquarters Company
    - 14th Armored Ordnance Battalion
      - Headquarters and Headquarters Company
      - 3× Maintenance companies
    - 14th Supply Battalion
      - Headquarters and Headquarters Company
      - 2× Truck companies
    - 76th Armored Medical Battalion
      - Headquarters and Headquarters Company
      - 3× Medical companies
    - 6th Armored Division Band

==== Light armored division ====
Early in 1943, the Army Ground Force began a series of studies to reorganize the various divisions within the Army. After reviewing the tables of organization and after allowing the various commands to review and comment on the proposed restructure, the War Department published on 15 September 1943 a new armored division tables of organization. The restructuring removed the two armored regiments and armored infantry regiment from the table of organization and replaced them with three tank battalions and three armored infantry battalions. Each tank battalion included one light and three medium tank companies. Both Combat Commands, A and B, remained, but an additional Reserve Command was added to the organization. This was a small headquarters element of 10 personnel tasked to clarify command and control in the division's rear area. Armored engineer battalions lost their bridge companies, while their engineer companies were reduced from four to three. The division's cavalry reconnaissance squadron was increased in size to include an HQ Troop, four reconnaissance troops, a light tank company, and an assault gun troop of four platoons (one for each reconnaissance troop). Within the division trains, the division lost its supply battalion and the division's armored service company. These changes pared the division's strength from 14,630 men to 10,937, slashed the number of tanks from 360 to 263, reduced the variety of vehicles to ease repair problems, and eliminated the maintenance-prone motorcycles.

After its reorganization as a light armored division the 6th Armored Division was composed of the following units:

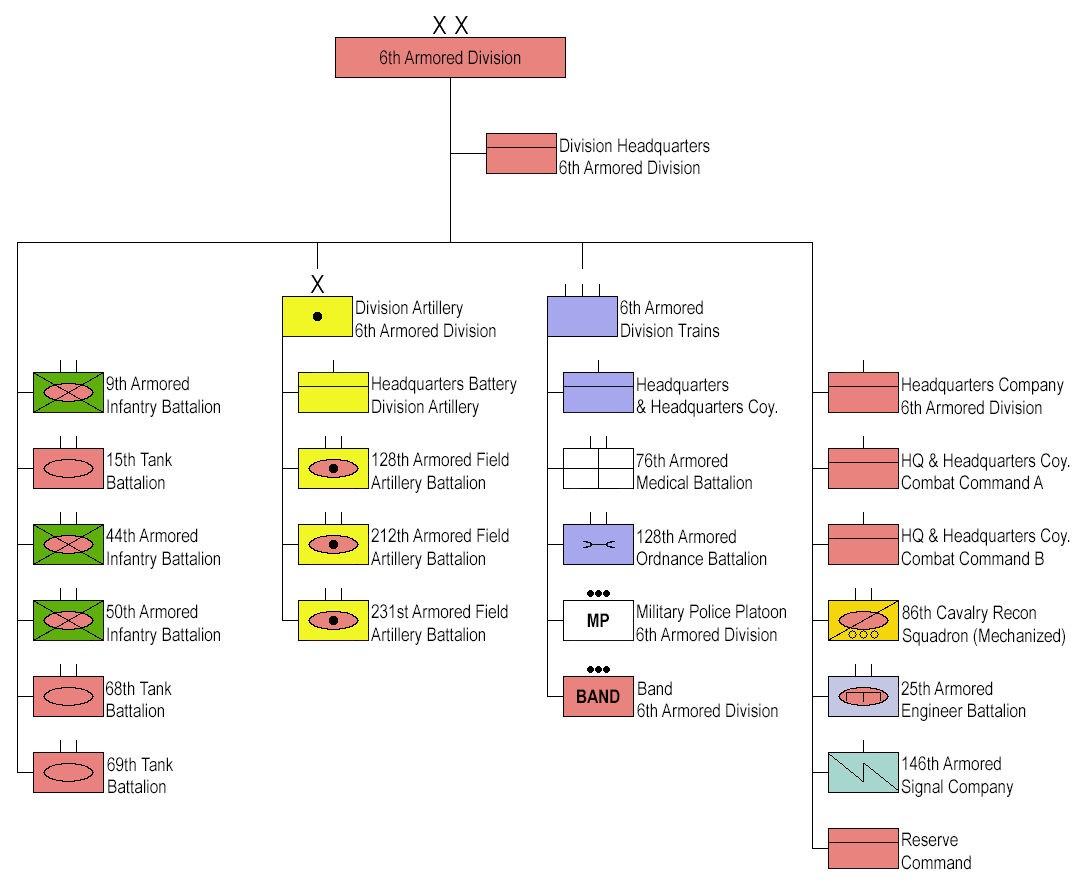
6th Armored Division organization after the division's reorganization (click to enlarge)

- 6th Armored Division
  - Division Headquarters
  - Headquarters Company, 6th Armored Division
  - Headquarters and Headquarters Company, Combat Command A
  - Headquarters and Headquarters Company, Combat Command B
  - 146th Armored Signal Company
  - Reserve Command
  - 15th Tank Battalion
    - Headquarters and Headquarters Company
    - 3× Medium Tank companies (M4 Sherman tanks)
    - Light Tank Company (M3/M5 Stuart or M24 Chaffee light tanks)
    - Service Company
  - 68th Tank Battalion
    - same organization as 15th Tank Battalion
  - 69th Tank Battalion
    - same organization as 15th Tank Battalion
  - 9th Armored Infantry Battalion
    - Headquarters and Headquarters Company
    - 3× Rifle companies (M3 half-tracks)
    - Service Company
  - 44th Armored Infantry Battalion
    - same organization as 9th Armored Infantry Battalion
  - 50th Armored Infantry Battalion
    - same organization as 9th Armored Infantry Battalion
  - 86th Cavalry Reconnaissance Squadron (Mechanized)
    - Headquarters and Headquarters and Service Troop
    - 4× Cavalry reconnaissance troops (M8 Greyhound armored cars)
    - Cavalry Assault Gun Troop (M8 Scott self propelled guns)
    - Light Tank Company (M3/M5 Stuart or M24 Chaffee light tanks)
  - 25th Armored Engineer Battalion
    - Headquarters and Headquarters Company
    - 3× Armored engineer companies
  - 6th Armored Division Artillery
    - Headquarters and Headquarters Battery
    - 128th Armored Field Artillery Battalion
      - Headquarters and Headquarters Battery
      - 3× Field artillery batteries (M7 Priest self propelled howitzers)
      - Service Battery
    - 212th Armored Field Artillery Battalion
      - same organization as 128th Armored Field Artillery Battalion
    - 231st Armored Field Artillery Battalion
      - same organization as 128th Armored Field Artillery Battalion
  - 6th Armored Division Trains
    - Headquarters and Headquarters Company
    - 76th Armored Medical Battalion
      - Headquarters and Headquarters Company
      - 3× Medical companies
    - 128th Armored Ordnance Battalion
      - Headquarters and Headquarters Company
      - 3× Maintenance companies
    - Military Police Platoon
    - 6th Armored Division Band

=== Combat chronicle ===
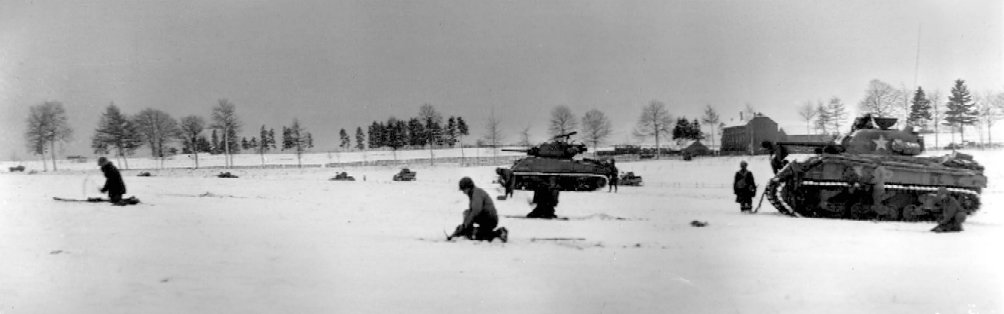
Members of the 44th Armored Infantry, supported by tanks of the 6th Armored Division, move in to attack German troops surrounding Bastogne. 31 December 1944

At the end of the Normandy Campaign, 6th AD assembled at Le Mesnil on 25 July 1944. 6th AD then passed through 8th Infantry Division to clear the heights near Le Bingard on 27 July 1944, and Combat Command A secured a bridgehead across the Sienne (river) near Pont de la Roque on 29 July 1944, and overran Granville on 31 July 1944. 6th AD then returned to Avranches, where it relieved 4th AD and secured the area bridges. In mid-August in Europe, the 6th Armored Division moved down to Lorient, where it was relieved by the 94th Infantry Division in September. Elements of the division participated in the Battle for Brest (7 August - 19 September 1944) using rapid advance and outflanking the enemy.

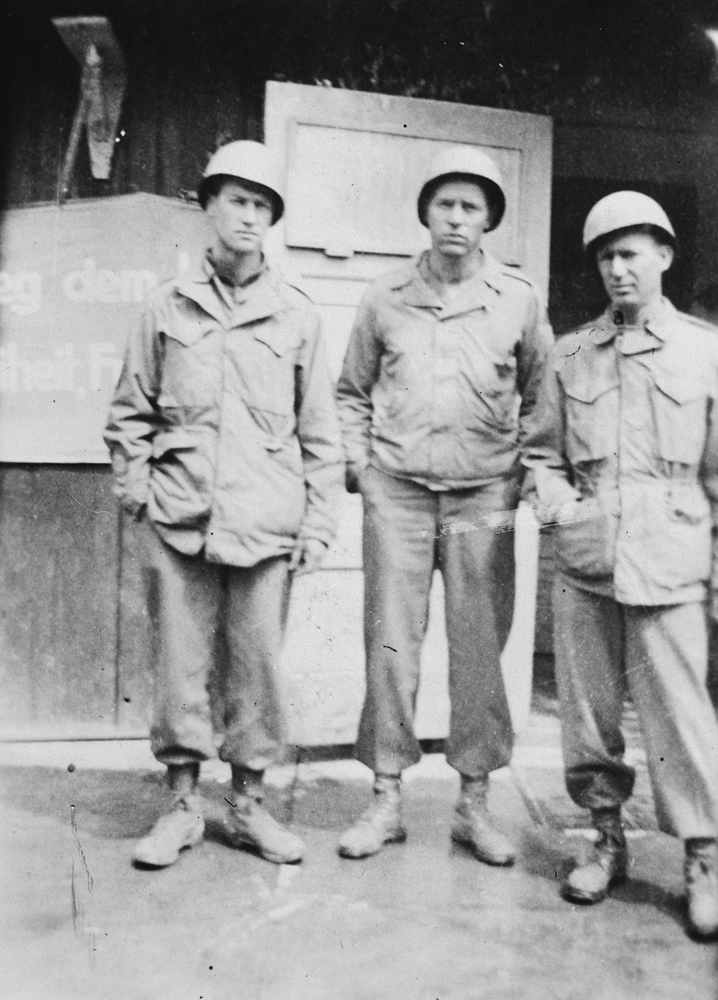
Three American soldiers from the 6th Armored Division pose in front of a building in the Buchenwald concentration camp. Pictured on the right is Sgt. Ezra Underhill (circa May 1945).

The 6th then turned east and cut across France, reaching the Saar in November. It crossed the Nied River on 11–12 November, against strong opposition, reaching the German border on 6 December, and established and maintained defensive positions in the vicinity of Saarbrücken.

On 23 December, the division was ordered north of Metz to take part in the Battle of the Bulge, and took over a sector along the south bank of the Sauer. The 6th was heavily engaged in the battle for Bastogne, finally driving the enemy back across the Our River into Germany by late January 1945.

After a short period of rehabilitation, the division resumed the offensive, penetrated the Siegfried Line, crossed the Prum, reached the Rhine River at Worms on 21 March, and set up a counterreconnaissance screen along its west bank. The 6th crossed the Rhine at Oppenheim on 25 March, drove on to Frankfurt, crossed the Main, captured Bad Nauheim, and continued to advance eastward, and surrounded and captured Mühlhausen on 4–5 April. After repulsing a light counterattack, it moved forward 60 miles to cross the Saale River and assisted in freeing Allied prisoners of war and the German concentration camp at Buchenwald. The division raced on, took Leipzig, crossed the River Zwickau Mulde at Rochlitz on 15 April 1945, and stopped, pending the arrival of the Red Army. Defensive positions along the Mulde River were held until the end of hostilities in Europe.

On 30 April 1945 command was transferred to Brigadier General George W. Read Jr. The division arrived at Camp Shanks, New York on 18 September 1945 and was inactivated.

=== Casualties ===
- Total battle casualties: 4,670
- Killed in action: 1,169
- Wounded in action: 3,667
- Missing in action: 88
- Prisoner of war: 83

=== Post-World War II ===
The division was reactivated at Fort Leonard Wood, Missouri on 5 September 1950 in response to the Korean War, and served as a training division until inactivation on 16 March 1956.

6th Armored Division (Training) organization at Fort Leonard Wood:

- Headquarters
  - Division Headquarters Company
  - Combat Command A
  - Combat Command B
  - Combat Command Reserve
- Maneuver Battalions (served as basic training/advanced training units)
  - 86th Recon Bn
  - 5th Heavy Tank Battalion
  - 15th Tank Battalion
  - 68th Tank Battalion
  - 69th Tank Battalion
  - 9th Armored Infantry Battalion
  - 44th Armored Infantry Battalion
  - 50th Armored Infantry Battalion
- 25th Armored Engineer Battalion
- U/I Signal Company/Bn?
- HHB, 6th Armored Division Artillery
  - 62nd Armored Field Artillery Battalion
  - 93rd Armored Field Artillery Battalion
  - 231st Armored Field Artillery Battalion
  - 253rd Armored Field Artillery Battalion
  - 61st Anti-Aircraft Artillery (Automatic Weapons) Battalion
- HHC, 6th Armored Division Trains
  - 6th Quartermaster Battalion
  - 128th Armored Ordinance and Maintenance Battalion

In 1985, the US Army recognized the 6th Armored with the designation of "Liberators."

== Commanders ==
- Brigadier General William H. H. Morris, Jr. (16 January 1942 – 17 May 1943)
- Major General Robert W. Grow (31 May 1943 – 30 April 1945)
- Brigadier General George W. Read Jr. (July–September 1945)
- Major General Samuel D. Sturgis III (1951–1952)
- Major General James G. Christiansen (1952–1953)
- Major General Arthur W. Pence (12 April 1953 – 1954)
- Major General Frank S. Bowen Jr. (1954–1955)

== Official history ==
At the end of World War II, two 6th Armored Division G3 officers, Majors Paul L. Bogen and Clyde J. Burk along with Aide-de-Camp Captain Cyrus R. Shockey, compiled a Combat Record of the Sixth Armored Division in the European Theatre of Operations 18 July 1944 – 8 May 1945. The official history by George F. Hofmann, The Super Sixth: History of the 6th Armored Division in World War II (1975, reprinted 2000) has been called by World War II scholar Martin Blumenson, a "first-rate military history." He also noted that General Patton called the 6th AD one of the two best divisions in his Third Army.
