= Charles Logasa =

American artist

- Born: July 14, 1883; Davenport, Iowa, U.S.
- Died: February 23, 1936 (aged 52)
- Known for: Painting

Charles Logasa (July 14, 1883 – February 2, 1936) was an artist.

== Early life ==
Charles Logasa was born in Davenport, Iowa, United States, on July 14, 1883, to Sephardic Jewish parents and Ukrainian immigrants. His father was Seth Moses Logasa. He had two sisters, Jeanie Deana Bogen née Logasa, and Hannah Logasa He came with his parents to Omaha, Nebraska, between the ages of three and five years old. As a boy he became a pupil of J. Laurie Wallace who was a pupil of Thomas Eakins. As a young man he studied drafting and engineering and around 1905 was employed as a draftsman for the City of Omaha in the Engineer's Office drawing maps. At the age of 22 he turned to oil painting. About 1910 or 1911 he left Omaha. He entered the service of the United States Geological Survey as a topographic draftsman in Washington, D.C.

== Art Student in Washington, D.C. ==
Logasa continued his art education with Messer and Brooke as a part-time student at the Corcoran College of Art and Design. In 1913 he took a year's leave of absence from his duties as topographic draftsman for the United States Geological Survey and went to Paris where he entered the Académie Julian studying under Paul Laurens. He returned to Corcoran until 1917. While he was a student, he rented a studio at 1421 F Street where, in 1916, he exhibited a selection of works from the Armory Show (1913), introducing Washington, D.C., to the new abstraction being made in Europe. The show contained 34 or 35 pictures on loan from Alfred Stieglitz in New York City. It had an immediate impact in Washington: it was very controversial. Logasa was called a "hopeless degenerate" and expelled from art school. The show featured among its works two watercolors by Paul Cézanne, two drawings and two oils by Pablo Picasso, a drawing and a watercolor by Henri Matisse and two by Georges Braque. Corcoran College of Art and Design, as with most other American art schools before the 1930s, was controlled by academics hostile to the new European Modernism.

== Europe & Travels ==
In 1920, growing recognition enabled Logasa to devote himself full-time to his painting. He traveled in Europe during the 1920s, returning to establish a residence in New York City in 1928. When Joaquín Torres García returned to Europe from New York City in 1924 and gave up his art, Logasa was able to convince him to start working again.

A foreword he composed after a Mexican stay in Old Monterrey in 1936 reveals a wry humor not often seen in his painting.

== New York City ==
In 1928 after his return to New York, he exhibited with the Salons of America and with the Independents. On April 2, 1930, he was listed on the United States Federal Census as living in a hotel on 7th Avenue and 51st Street in Manhattan. He lists himself as an artist having been in that occupation for 6 years. In May 1931, he was asked to hang a one-man show, his first, at the Contemporary Arts Gallery in New York. The same year he was invited to the Carnegie International. In 1932 he was represented in the Pennsylvania Annual Academy and in the Whitney Museum Biennial of American Art. Logasa was also a director of the Society of Independent Artists, an organization created to organize annual exhibitions by avant-garde artists. Exhibitions were to be open to anyone who wanted to display their work, and shows were without juries or prizes. Founded in 1916, the society was begun by collectors Walter Arensberg, and Katherine S. Dreier, along with Modern artists John Covert, Marcel Duchamp, William J. Glackens, Albert Gleizes, John Marin, Walter Pach, Man Ray, John Sloan and Joseph Stella.

== Joslyn Art Museum ==
Twenty paintings by Charles Logasa were given to the Society of Liberal Arts, Joslyn Art Museum, Omaha, Nebraska, by his sister, Hannah Logasa of Chicago. In March 1939, the complete collection was shown there. On June 25, 1966, another exhibit opened at the Joslyn and included Logasa's paintings and drawings.

== Death ==
He died in New York City on February 23, 1936, at the Hotel Taft (New York Times, 24 February 1936, 17:3). He was interred in Rock Island, Illinois, at Chippianook Cemetery.
