= Hannah Logasa =

American librarian

Hannah Logasa Professor Emeritus
- Анна Логаса (Russian) חנה לאֹגַסַ (Hebrew)
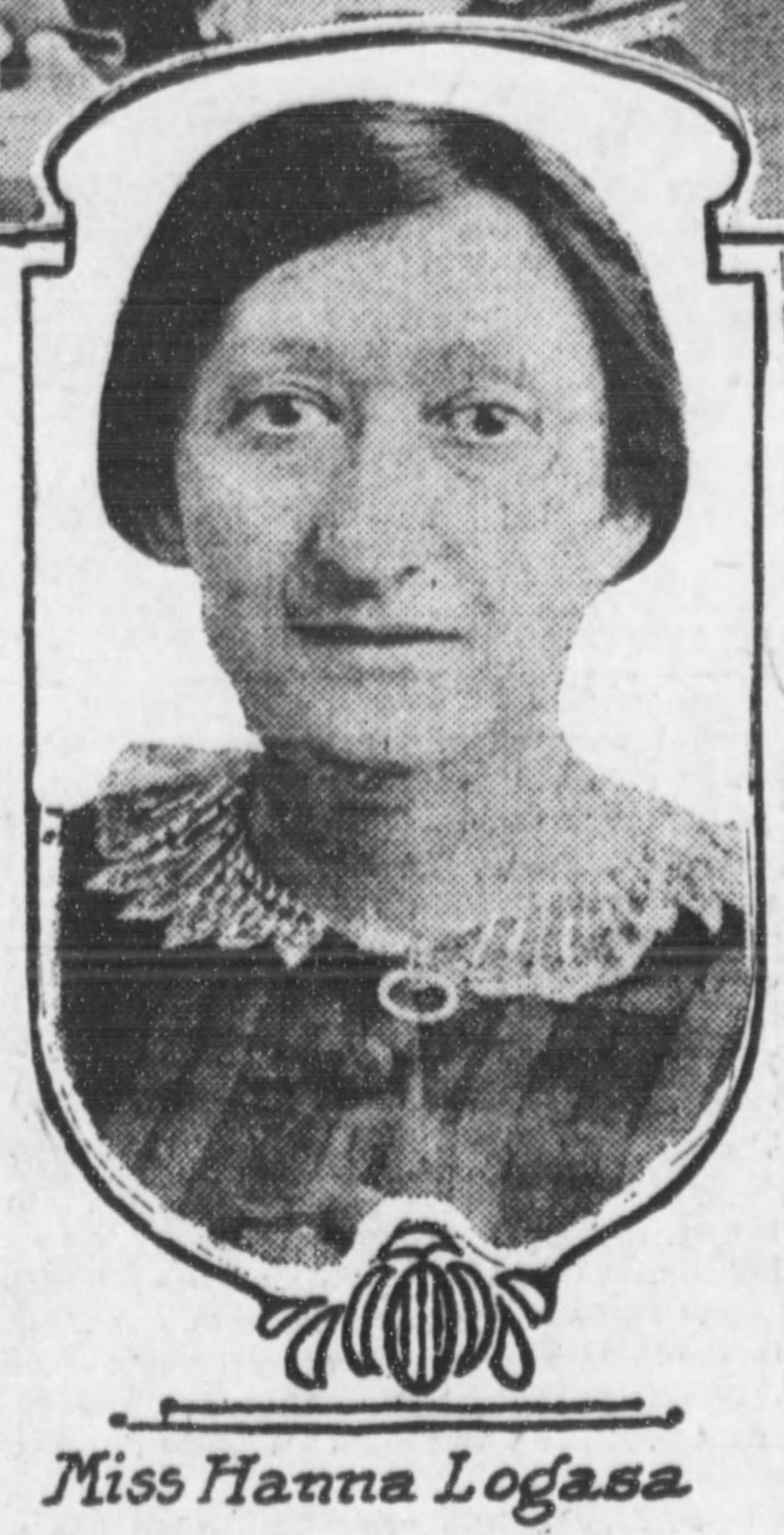
- Born: February 27, 1878; Krasnoe, Vinnitsya, Podolia, Ukraine
- Died: December 11, 1967 (aged 89); Omaha, Nebraska, USA
- Known for: Professionalising school libraries
- Awards: Phi Beta Kappa

Academic background
- Education: State University of Iowa

Academic work
- Discipline: Libraries
- Sub-discipline: School libraries

Signature
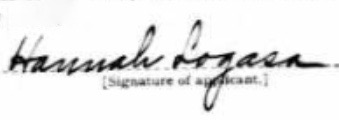

Hannah Logasa (1878–1967) is considered a pioneer of school libraries. Credited with identifying the necessity of libraries in school, Logasa worked to achieve strong interaction between the library, students, and teachers at the University of Chicago Laboratory High School.

== Early life ==
Hannah Logasa was the daughter of Seth Moses Logasa, a Ukrainian immigrant to Omaha, Nebraska and a Sephardic Jew, and her mother Ida (née Wasserman). She was one of four siblings. She had an older sister, Bertha Glikbarg (née Logasa), a brother, artist Charles Logasa, and a sister named Jeanie Deana Bogen (née Logasa). She moved to Omaha from Ukraine when she was three years old.

== Career ==
From 1904 to 1914 Logasa worked at the Omaha Public Library. By 1908, she was a head librarian, and in 1914 was head of the department of statistics and accounts. During this period she attended class in library science at the State University of Iowa.

=== University of Chicago Laboratory High School librarian ===
In 1909, education psychologist Charles Hubbard Judd arrived at the University of Chicago and in 1910, set up a study hall in the school library of the University of Chicago Laboratory High School. The library and the study hall were established in September 1910. The first librarian hired to run the library resigned after a short time because she had not expected the extra work the study hall and formation of the library would take. In 1914, Logasa was appointed head librarian at University of Chicago Laboratory School. In the interim, without a librarian, the library room had become disorderly. Logasa was very successful in bringing Judd's vision to a reality, building up the library collection, improving student morale, and supervising study.

In the late 1910s, Logasa was a member of the Commission on Library Organization and Equipment of the National Education Association and the North Central Association of Colleges and Secondary Schools chaired by Carl Casper Certain. The Commission published a preliminary report in 1917 and a final report, Standard Library Organization and Equipment for Secondary Schools of Different Sizes, in 1920, which set guidelines and standards for early school libraries. Her work in promoting school libraries, both at the Lab and nationally, earned her a position as an instructor of education at the University of Chicago in 1928. In 1929 she began teaching home study courses in library science. After retiring as a professor emeritus, she returned to Omaha. She left the university in 1939, although she remained on the roles of faculty until her death.

== School libraries ==
Logasa's influence was magnified by her writing, and she is considered the pioneer "who professionalized children’s school libraries". Her textbook, The High School Library: Its Function in Education was among the first professional materials created for librarians serving teens. She is credited with identifying the necessity of libraries in school, and creating strong interactions between librarians, students, and teachers. She was a member of the National Education Association, the National Council of Teachers of English, and the American Association of School Librarians.

Logasa wrote a number of bibliographic indices that became known as definitive sources. They include indices to plays, poems, and non-fiction of the period. Logasa was a proponent of progressive education, advocating scientific method, testing, and student feedback. She believed in the importance of adolescent psychology in succeeding as a librarian, and took a democratic approach to library use. She did not fully agree with progressive tenets, as she believed that textbooks were functionally valuable and should not be discarded.

== Soybeans and Israel ==
During the late 1940s and early 1950s Logasa became interested in the fledgling nation of Israel. In order to help the new nation she decided to try to identify a potential staple crop, and after extensive research she determined that soybeans could help the Israeli government feed its people and sent her report to David Ben-Gurion. The report was well received and Israel began planting soybeans.

Ben-Guiron personally urged Logasa to visit him in Israel, which she did in 1961. She did not inform Ben-Guiron she had come but he had found out and sent flowers to her hotel along with an invitation to visit him in his home in Tel Aviv. When she declined, Ben-Guiron went to talk with her. Later in 1967, while visiting the US, Ben-Guiron invited Logasa to meet with him again in Chicago.

== Later life, legacy and tributes ==
By 1940, she had moved to Lincoln, Nebraska, and in the 1950s she lived in Denver, Colorado. She continued to be active in school libraries and youth education during her later life. At the time of her death, she was again living in Omaha. She died on December 11, 1967, at a hospital in Omaha. Her funeral was at Temple Israel in Omaha and she was buried in Rock Island, Illinois. Her will stipulated that "proceeds from her books were to go to the University [of Chicago]...", and she also left money for the Omaha Public Library "for the purchase of books". She entrusted most of her estate to David Ben-Gurion to support agricultural research in Israel. Near Sde Boker, Israel, a building used for agricultural experimentation bears a plaque with her name.

Upon her death, columnist David McMorris of the World Herald wrote a tribute to Logasa: "...this modest lady was a nationally known bibliographer... a grateful Ben-Gurion credited her with helping save the newly founded state of Israel from starvation." McMorris continued, "She was a pioneer in expanding the library's role in schools, published bibliographies, earned a bachelor of philosophy degree and a Phi Beta Kappa key, began a Chicago U. correspondence program for training librarians."

== Selected publications ==
- Logasa, H. (1916). Some Phases of Library-Study-Room Management. The School Review, 24(5), 352–358.
- Logasa, H. (1926). The high school library: its function in education. D. Appleton and company.
- Logasa, H., & Wright, M. M. (1926). Tests for the Appreciation of Literature. Public School Pub.
- Logasa, H. (1934). An Appraisal of Current Periodicals in the High School Library. Wilson Bulletin for Librarians, IX (December, 1934), 177–80.
- Logasa, H. (1934). Historical Fiction and Other Reading References for History Classes in Junior and Senior High Schools. McKinley Publishing Company, 1934.
- Logasa, H. (1938). The school library in the reading program. Peabody Journal of Education, 16(3), 220–226.
- Logasa, H. (1938). The Study Hall in Junior and Senior High Schools.
- Logasa, H. (1938). The Study Hall. New York: Macmillan Co, 22.
- Logasa, H. (1940). The Library in the Unit Plan. The Phi Delta Kappan, 22(6), 313–320.
- Logasa, H. (1941). Biography in collections suitable for junior and senior high schools. HW Wilson.
- Logasa, H. (1942). Regional United States.
- Logasa, H. (1946). The comic spirit and the comics. Wilson Library Bulletin, 21, 238–239.
- Logasa, H. (1947). Figures tell but half the story. Library Journal, 72(13), 999–1000.
- Logasa, H. (1953). Book Selection Handbook: For Elementary and Secondary School (No. 83). FW Faxon Company, Incorporated.
- Logasa, H. (1953). Grow old along with me. Library Journal, 78(19), 1887–1888.
- Logasa, H. (1958). Historical fiction. McKinley.
- Logasa, H. (1960). Historical non-fiction.
- Logasa, H. (1963). World culture: a selected, annotated bibliography (Vol. 3). McKinley Pub. Co..
- Logasa, H. (1964). Historical fiction: guide for junior and senior high schools and colleges, also for general reader. Vol. 1. McKinley Pub. Co.
- Logasa, H. (1964). Historical non-fiction: an organized, annotated, supplementary reference book for the use of schools, libraries, general reader. Vol. 2. McKinley Pub. Co.
- Logasa, H. (1965). Book Selection in Education for Children and Young Adults (No. 93). FW Faxon Company.
- Logasa, H. (1967). Science for Youth: an annotated bibliography for children and young adults (Vol. 6). McKinley Pub. Co.
- Irwin, L. B., & Logasa, H. (1971). A guide to historical fiction for the use of schools, libraries, and the general reader (Vol. 1). McKinley Pub. Co.
- Logasa, H. (2007). Historical fiction and other reading references for classes in junior and senior high schools. Read Books.
- Logasa, H. The Librarian's Contribution to the Educational Standards of the High School. Fifty-fourth Yearbook of the National Education Association of the United States.
- Logasa, H. The Supervision of High School Library Service. Supervision of Secondary Subjects, 607–51.

== See also ==
- Jews and Judaism in Omaha, Nebraska
