= 68th Armor Regiment =

- Coat of arms
- Active: 1933 – 2026
- Country: United States
- Branch: United States Army
- Type: Armor
- Size: Regiment
- Garrison/HQ: Fort Carson
- Nickname: "Silver Lions"
- Mottos: Ventre a Terre (With Great Speed)

Insignia
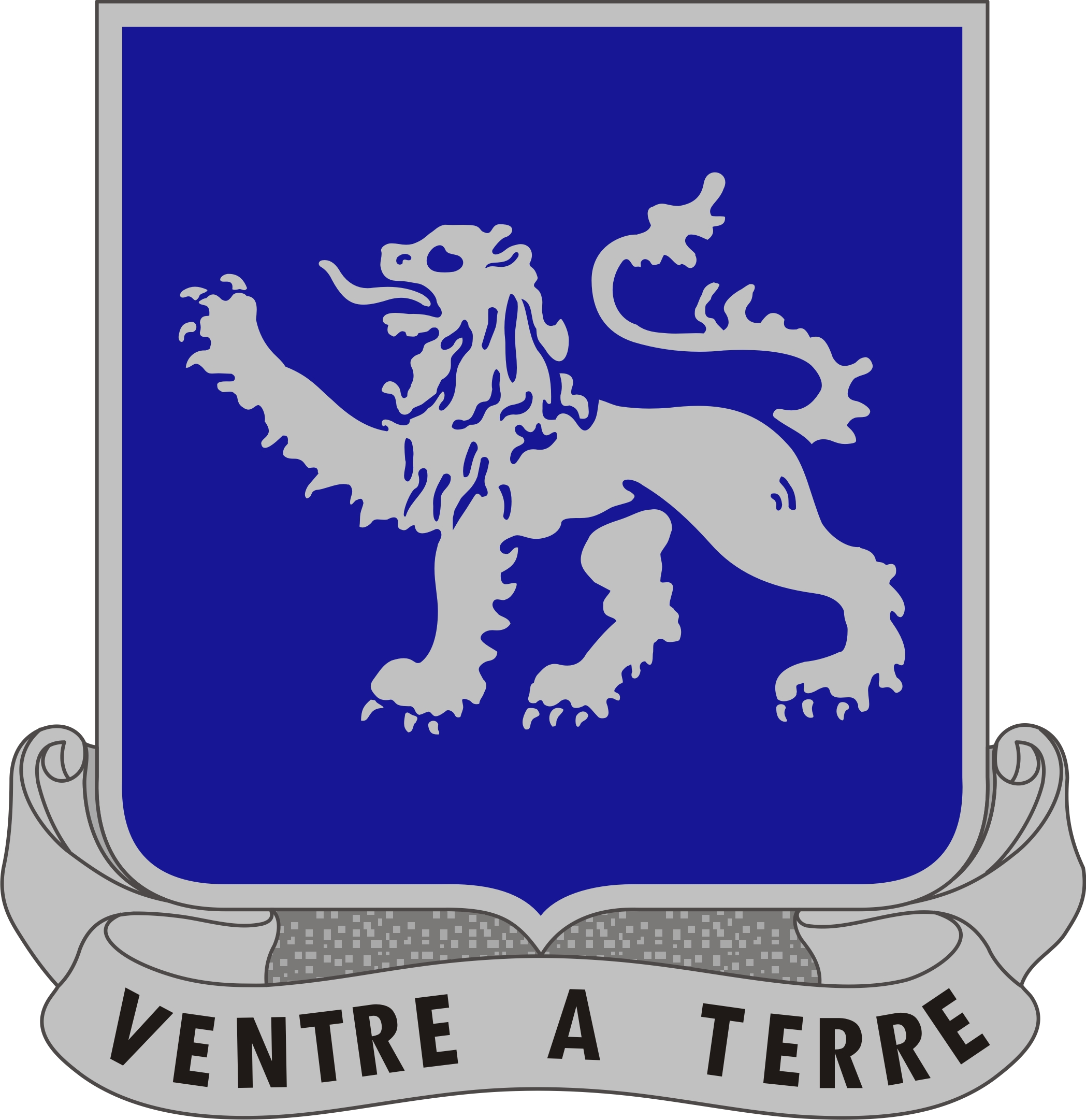
- Distinctive unit insignia

The 68th Armor Regiment is an armored regiment of the United States Army. It was first activated in 1933 in the Regular Army as the 68th Infantry Regiment (Light Tanks).

== Lineage ==
=== World War I ===
During World War I in France as part of the American Expeditionary Forces (AEF), the 326th, 327th, and 328th Battalions, Tank Corps and the 1st Tank Center were established between April and June 1918. In September 1918, the 326th and 327th Battalions were redesignated the 344th and 345th Battalions respectively, and they fought in the St. Mihiel and Meuse-Argonne campaigns. The 345th was the predecessor lineage to the 1st, 2nd, and 7th Tank Companies, and Company B of the 344th became the 5th Tank Company. The 328th Battalion, formed in the U.S., became the 3rd, 4th, and 6th Tank Companies.

==== Unrelated unit also designated "68th Infantry Regiment" ====
The 68th Infantry Regiment was originally constituted in the Regular Army on 9 July 1918 and assigned to the 9th Division. It was organized in July 1918 at Camp Sheridan, Montgomery, Alabama, from personnel of the 46th Infantry Regiment. It did not go overseas before the end of the war, and was relieved from the 9th Division and demobilized 15 February 1919 at Camp Sheridan.

=== Interwar period ===
The 68th Infantry was constituted on 1 October 1933 in the Regular Army as the 68th Infantry (Light Tanks), and absorbed the lineage of the tank companies. The 68th Infantry (Light Tanks) was allotted to the 6th Corps Area, and activated as a "Regular Army Inactive" (RAI) unit at Peoria, Illinois, manned with Organized Reserve personnel. On 7 April 1937, the headquarters location was changed to Chicago, Illinois. The 1st and 2nd Battalions were activated on 1 January 1940 at Fort Benning, Georgia, less Reserve personnel, by redesignation of the 1st through 7th Tank Companies (organized in 1918) of the 1st through 7th Divisions. The inactive elements of the regiment were withdrawn from the Sixth Corps Area and allotted to the Fourth Corps Area. On 30 May 1940, the 2nd Battalion was transferred to Fort Lewis, Washington. On 30 June 1940, the 1st Battalion was inactivated at Fort Benning. On 15 July 1940, the remaining active elements of the regiment were redesignated as the 68th Armored Regiment and assigned to the 2nd Armored Brigade of the 2nd Armored Division. The regiment (less the 2nd Battalion which was already active) was activated 1 August 1940 at Fort Benning, Georgia. When the structure of U.S. armored divisions was reorganized marly in 1942, the regiment was inactivated on 8 January 1942 at Fort Benning and relieved from assignment to the 2nd Armored Division. The 68th Armored Regiment was assigned on 15 February 1942 to the new 6th Armored Division and reactivated at Fort Knox, Kentucky.

=== 1st Tank Company ===
- Organized 7 June 1918 in the National Army in France as Company A, 327th Battalion, Tank Corps, American Expeditionary Force.
- Redesignated 12 September 1918 as Company A, 345th Battalion, Tank Corps.
- Reorganized and redesignated 8 January 1921 as the 1st Tank Company and allotted to the Regular Army
- Assigned 1 April 1921 to the 1st Division
- Relieved 16 October 1939 from assignment to the 1st Division
- Consolidated 1 January 1940 with Company A, 68th Infantry and consolidated unit designated as Company A, 68th Infantry.
- Inactivated 5 June 1940 at Fort Benning.
- Redesignated 15 July 1940 as Company A, 68th Armored Regiment, and assigned to the 2nd Armored Division.
- Activated 1 August 1940 at Fort Benning.
- See "Regiment" for further history

=== 2nd Tank Company ===
- Organized 7 June 1918 in the National Army in France as Company C, 327th Battalion, Tank Corps, AEF.
- Redesignated 12 September 1918 as Company C, 345th Battalion, Tank Corps.
- Reorganized and redesignated 8 January 1921 as the 2nd Tank Company, allotted to the Regular Army, and assigned to the 2nd Division.
- Redesignated 1 January 1940 as Company D, 68th Infantry Regiment (Light Tanks).
- Redesignated 15 July 1940 as Company D, 68th Armored Regiment, and assigned to the 2nd Armored Division.

=== 3rd Tank Company ===
- Organized April 1918 in the National Army at Camp Colt, Pennsylvania as Company A, 328th Battalion, Tank Corps
- Reorganized and redesignated 8 January 1921 as the 3rd Tank Company, allotted to the Regular Army, and assigned to the 3rd Division.
- Redesignated 1 January 1940 as Company E, 68th Infantry (Light Tanks).
- Redesignated 15 July 1940 as Company E, 68th Armored Regiment, and assigned to the 2nd Armored Division.

=== 4th Tank Company ===
- Organized April 1918 in the National Army at Camp Colt, Pennsylvania as Company C, 328th Battalion, Tank Corps
- Reorganized and redesignated 8 January 1921 as the 4th Tank Company, allotted to the Regular Army, and assigned to the 4th Division)
- Inactivated 27 September 1921 at Fort Lewis, Washington.
- Activated 15 September 1931 at Fort McClellan, Alabama.
- Redesignated 1 January 1940 as Company B, 68th Infantry (Light Tanks), and relieved from assignment to the 4th Division.
- Inactivated 5 June 1940 at Fort Benning, Georgia
- Redesignated 15 July 1940 as Company B, 68th Armored Regiment, and assigned to the 2nd Armored Division.
- Activated 1 August 1940 at Fort Benning.

=== 5th and 6th Tank Companies ===
- Organized 17 February 1918 as Company B (Provisional), Tank Service, American Expeditionary Force.
- Redesignated 16 April 1918 in the National Army at Borg, France as Company B, 1st Tank Center, American Expeditionary Force.
- Redesignated on 6 June 1918 as Company B, 326th Battalion, Tank Corps.
- Redesignated 1 September 1918 as Company B, 344th Battalion, Tank Corps.
- Reorganized and redesignated 8 January 1921 as the 5th Tank Company, allotted to the Regular Army, and assigned to the 5th Division.
- Consolidated 1 January 1940 with the 6th Tank Company, 6th Division, and reorganized and redesignated as Company C, 68th Infantry Regiment
- Inactivated 5 June 1940 at Fort Benning, Georgia.
- Redesignated 15 July 1940 as Company C, 68th Armored Regiment, and assigned to the 2nd Armored Division.
- Activated 1 August 1940 at Fort Benning.

=== 7th Tank Company ===
- Organized 7 June 1918 as Company B, 327th Battalion, Tank Corps, American Expeditionary Force.
- Redesignated 12 September 1918 as Company B, 345th Battalion, Tank Corps.
- Reorganized and redesignated 8 January 1921 as the 7th Tank Company, allotted to the Regular Army, and assigned to the 7th Division.
- Inactivated 6 September 1921 at Camp Meade, Maryland.
- Redesignated 1 January 1940 as Company F, 68th Infantry Regiment (Light Tanks), and activated at Fort Benning, Georgia.
- Redesignated 15 July 1940 as Company F, 68th Armored Regiment, and assigned to the 2nd Armored Division.

=== Company G, 68th Infantry Regiment (Light Tanks) ===
- Constituted 1 October 1933 in the Regular Army as Company G, 68th Infantry Regiment (Light Tanks).
- Redesignated 15 July 1940 as Company G, 68th Armored Regiment, and assigned to the 2nd Armored Division.
- Activated 13 August 1940 at Fort Benning.

=== Company H, 68th Infantry Regiment (Light Tanks) ===
- Constituted 1 October 1933 in the Regular Army as Company G, 68th Infantry Regiment (Light Tanks).
- Redesignated 15 July 1940 as Company G, 68th Armored Regiment, and assigned to the 2nd Armored Division.
- Activated 13 August 1940 at Fort Benning.

=== Armored regiment ===
- (1st and 2nd Battalions activated 1 January 1940 at Fort Benning, Georgia, as Infantry Tank Battalions (See Above);
- 1st Battalion inactivated 30 June 1940 at Fort Benning, Georgia, (See Above).
- Converted and redesignated 15 July 1940 as the 68th Armored Regiment and assigned to the 2nd Armored Division.
- Regiment (less the already-active 2nd Battalion) activated 1 August 1940 at Fort Benning, Georgia.
- Inactivated 8 January 1942 at Fort Benning, Georgia, and relieved from assignment to the 2nd Armored Division
- Assigned 15 February 1942 to the 6th Armored Division and activated at Fort Knox, Kentucky
- Moved to Camp Chaffee, Arkansas on 20 March 1942 for divisional training and maneuvers.
- Moved to Camp Young, California on 12 October 1942 to train at the Desert Training Center.

=== Triangulation ===
- Regiment broken up 20 September 1943 and its elements reorganized and redesignated as follows:
1. Regimental Headquarters and Headquarters Company and 2d Battalion as the 68th Tank Battalion and remained assigned to the 6th Armored Division
2. 1st Battalion as the 773d Tank Battalion and relieved from assignment to the 6th Armored Division
3. 3d Battalion as the 15th Tank Battalion and remained assigned to the 6th Armored Division
4. Reconnaissance Company as Troop D, 86th Cavalry Reconnaissance Squadron, Mechanized, and remained an element of the 6th Armored Division
5. Maintenance and Service Companies, and Band disbanded.

=== World War II ===
==== Troop D, 86th Cavalry Reconnaissance Squadron ====
- Deployed from the New York Port of Embarkation on 11 February 1944.
- Arrived in England on 23 February 1944.
- Deployed further to France on 19 July 1944.
- Was located at Kahla, Germany on 14 August 1945
- Return to Boston Port of Embarkation on 18 September 1945

==== 15th Tank Battalion ====
- Deployed from the New York Port of Embarkation on 11 February 1944.
- Arrived in England on 24 February 1944.
- Further deployed to France on 22 July 1944
- Located at Jena, Germany on 14 August 1945
- Returned to the New York Port of Embarkation on 20 February 1946

==== 68th Tank Battalion ====
- Deployed from the New York Port of Embarkation on 11 February 1944.
- Arrived in England on 24 February 1944.
- Further deployed to France on 22 July 1944
- Located at Buttstädt, Germany on 14 August 1945
- Returned to the Hampton Roads Port of Embarkation on 29 December 1945

==== 773rd Tank Battalion ====
- Deployed from the San Francisco Port of Embarkation on 8 February 1944.
- Arrived in Hawaii on 15 February 1944.
- Further deployed to Saipan on 15 July 1944
- Further deployed to Tinian on 24 July 1944
- Returned to Hawaii on 17 August 1944
- Further deployed to Hojaki Shima on 26 March 1945
- Further deployed to Tokashiki Shima 27 March 1945
- Further deployed to Keise Shima 31 March 1945
- Further deployed to Ie Shima 27 March 1945
- Inactivated 15 April 1946 in Japan

=== Reconsolidation ===
- After 20 September 1943 the above units underwent changes that resulted in reconsolidation as follows:
1. 68th Tank Battalion relieved 19 July 1945 from assignment to the 6th Armored Division
  Inactivated 29 December 1945 at Camp Patrick Henry, Virginia
  Redesignated 21 August 1950 as the 68th Medium Tank Battalion and assigned to the 6th Armored Division
  Activated 5 September 1950 at Fort Leonard Wood, Missouri
  Inactivated 16 March 1956 at Fort Leonard Wood, Missouri
  Relieved 1 July 1957 from assignment to the 6th Armored Division.
2. 773d Tank Battalion reorganized and redesignated 27 October 1943 as the 773d Amphibian Tank Battalion
  Reorganized and redesignated 10 January 1944 as the 773d Amphibian Tractor Battalion
  Inactivated 15 April 1946 in Japan
  Redesignated 24 December 1946 as the 56th Amphibian Tractor Battalion
  Redesignated 18 April 1949 as the 56th Amphibious Tank and Tractor Battalion
  Activated 10 May 1949 at Fort Worden, Washington
  Inactivated 15 December 1954 at Fort Worden, Washington
3. 15th Tank Battalion relieved 9 July 1945 from assignment to the 6th Armored Division
  Inactivated 22 February 1946 – 25 February 1946 at Camp Kilmer, New Jersey.
4. Headquarters and Headquarters Company, 15th Tank Battalion, redesignated 1 August 1946 as 15th Tank Company, and activated at Fort Riley, Kansas
  Inactivated 6 November 1946 at Fort Riley, Kansas
  Activated 1 June 1947 in Italy
  Inactivated 1 December 1949 in Italy
  Redesignated 21 August 1950 as Headquarters, Headquarters and Service Company, 15th Medium Tank Battalion (organic elements of the 15th Tank Battalion redesignated as elements of the 15th Medium Tank Battalion), and assigned to the 6th Armored Division
  Battalion activated 5 September 1950 at Fort Leonard Wood, Missouri
  Inactivated 16 March 1956 at Fort Leonard Wood, Missouri
  Relieved 1 July 1957 from assignment to the 6th Armored Division.
5. Troop D, 86th Cavalry Reconnaissance Squadron, Mechanized, inactivated 19 September 1945 at Camp Myles Standish, *Massachusetts
  Redesignated 21 August 1950 as Company D, 86th Reconnaissance Battalion, and remained an element of the 6th Armored Division
  Activated 5 September 1950 at Fort Leonard Wood, Missouri
  Inactivated 16 March 1956 at Fort Leonard Wood, Missouri
  Relieved 1 July 1957 from assignment to the 6th Armored Division.
6. Maintenance and Service Companies, 68th Armored Regiment, reconstituted 1 July 1957 in the Regular Army
- 68th and 15th Medium Tank Battalions; 56th Amphibious Tank and Tractor Battalion; Company D, 86th Reconnaissance Battalion; and Maintenance and Service Companies, 68th Armored Regiment, consolidated, reorganized, and redesignated 1 July 1957 as the 68th Armor Regiment, a parent regiment under the Combat Arms Regimental System

=== Post Combat Arms Regimental System (1957) Consolidation ===
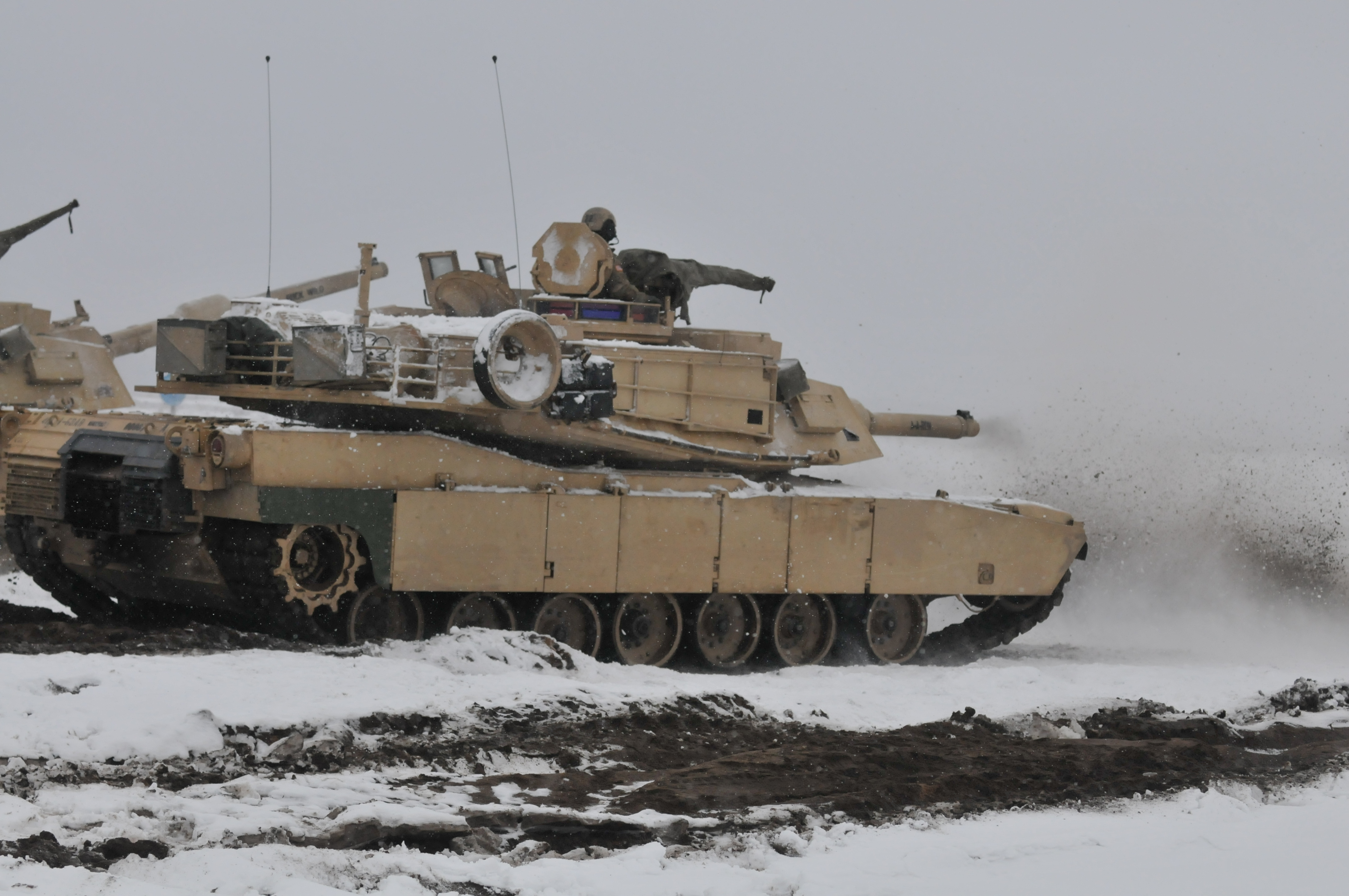
1-68th Armor, 4th Infantry Division conducts live-fire certification with their M1A2 Abrams in Poland (2017)

A Co (A), 4-68th Armor, 82nd Airborne Division conducts live fire with their LAV-25A2s at Camp Atterbury (2019)

- 68th Armor Regiment withdrawn 1 April 1984 from the Combat Arms Regimental System and reorganized under the United States Army Regimental System (USARS). 1st and 2nd Battalions remained assigned to 8th Infantry Division.
- 1st Battalion redesignated on 1 July 1957 as 1st Medium Tank Battalion (Patton), 68th Armor, assigned to 3rd Infantry Division at Fort Benning, GA. Relieved 1 April 1963 from assignment to the 3d Infantry Division; concurrently redesignated as the 1st Battalion, 68th Armor, and assigned to the 8th Infantry Division in Germany. 1st Battalion was inactivated 15 March 1991 in Wildflecken, Germany and relieved from assignment to the 8th Infantry Division. Assigned 16 January 1996 to the 4th Infantry Division and activated at Fort Carson, Colorado by reflagging 2-77th Armor.
- 2nd Battalion assigned to the 8th Infantry Division 1 April 1963 at Baumholder, Germany as the first armored battalion of the regiment assigned to 8th Infantry Division. Reflagged 1-35th Armor as part of 1st Armored Division on 15 February 1997.
- 3rd Battalion designated on 1 July 1957 as 3d Medium Tank Battalion (Patton), 68th Armor. Assigned 1 December 1957 to 9th Infantry Division at Fort Carson, Co. Inactivated 31 January 1962, redesignated, assigned to the 8th Infantry Division at Sullivan Barracks, Mannheim, and activated 1 April 1963 in Germany. Remained in Germany until late 1980s, when reflagged to 5th Bn, 77th Armor. Unit designation moved to 4th Infantry Division at Fort Carson, CO by reflagging 6-32 Armor on 1 April 84.
- 4th Battalion was activated 5 September 1950 as part of 6th Armored Division at Fort Leonard Wood, MO and deactivated 16 March 1956. Activated 13 June 1958 at Fort Bragg, NC. Unit transferred 1 July 1965 to Fort Stewart, GA. Transferred back to Fort Bragg and assigned to the 82nd Airborne Division from 22 March 1968 until 7 February 1984. 4th Bn was then reflagged as the 3rd Battalion, 73rd Armor on 1 April 84. Both units employed the M551 Sheridan. On 1 April 84, assigned to 4th Infantry Division and activated at Fort Carson, Colorado by reflagging 3-10th Cavalry.
- 5th Battalion withdrawn from Regular Army and reallocated to Army Reserve 7 April 1959. Assigned to the 77th Division, activated 1 May 1959 in Bronx, NY. Inactivated 26 March 1963, withdrawn from the Army Reserve. Assigned to 8th Infantry Division and reactivated in Germany (Sullivan Barracks) on 1 April 1966. Reflagged in 1989 to 3rd Bn, 77th Armor.
- 6th Battalion was activated on 20 April 1959, assigned to the 79th Division. When 79th Division was deactivated, the battalion was assigned on 7 January 1963 to the 157th Infantry Brigade - designated at that time as the 157th Separate Infantry Brigade (Mechanized)(USAR) at Horsham, PA. The battalion was deactivated on 1 September 1995 as one of the last two armor battalions (6-68th Armor and 8-40th Armor) in the U.S. Army Reserve.
- 7th Battalion was activated on 1 July 1957 and relieved from assignment to 6th Armored Division. Withdrawn from Regular Army and reallocated to the Army Reserve. Activated 20 March 1959 and assigned to the 83rd Division, battalion headquartered in Salem, OH. Reorganized and redesignated on 15 April 1963. Inactivated 31 December 1965.
- 8th Battalion was activated on 1 July 1957 and relieved from assignment to 6th Armored Division. Withdrawn from Regular Army and reallocated to the Army Reserve. Constituted on 27 March 1963, then activated on 15 April 1963. Assigned to the 83rd Division, battalion headquartered in Columbus, OH. Inactivated 31 December 1965.
- Company A, 4th Battalion was reactivated on 26 October 2018 as part of the 82nd Airborne Division's 1st Brigade Combat Team, equipped with LAV-25A2s acquired from the U.S. Marine Corps and was inactivated on 25 September 2020. The company was a locally-raised provisional unit and its designation was not authorized by the Department of the Army.

== Honors ==
=== Campaign participation credit ===
- World War I:
1. Saint-Mihiel;
2. Meuse-Argonne
- World War II:
1. Normandy;
2. Northern France;
3. Rhineland;
4. Ardennes-Alsace;
5. Central Europe;
6. Western Pacific (with arrowhead);
7. Ryukyu Islands (with arrowhead)
- Korean War:
1. UN Defensive (with arrowhead) (A/1st BN as 56th Amphib Tank and Tractor Bn)
2. UN Offensive (A/1st BN as 56th Amphib Tank and Tractor Bn)
3. CCF Intervention (A/1st BN as 56th Amphib Tank and Tractor Bn)
4. Summer 1953 (1st Bn as 56th Amphib Tank and Tractor Bn)
- Operation Iraqi Freedom:
1. Liberation of Iraq 19 March 2003 - 1 May 2003
2. Transition of Iraq 2 May 2003 - 28 June 2004
3. Iraqi Governance 29 June 2004 - 15 December 2005
4. National Resolution 16 December 2005 – 9 January 2007
5. Iraqi Surge 10 January 2007 -31 December 2008
6. Iraqi Sovereignty 1 January 2009 – 31 August 2010

=== Decorations ===
1. Presidential Unit Citation (Navy) for SAIPAN AND TINIAN (Regiment and all Bns) (DA GO 73, 1948)
2. Presidential Unit Citation (Navy) for INCHON (Company A, 56th Amphibious Tank and Tractor Bn), 1952 (A/1st Bn) (DA GO 63, 1952)
3. Presidential Unit Citation (Army) for LANDROFF, FRANCE (Saar Campaign, 14–15 November 1944) (Company A, 68th Tank Battalion), 1946 (A/4th Bn)
4. Presidential Unit Citation (Army) for HAN-SUR-NIED, FRANCE (Saar Campaign, 8 November - 24 December 1944)(Company B, 68th Tank Bn), 1952 (B/5th Bn)
5. Valorous Unit Award (Army) for IRAQ 2012-2013 (1st Bn)
6. Valorous Unit Award (Army) for IRAQ 2007-2009 (1st Bn)
7. Valorous Unit Award (Army) for IRAQ 2005-2006 (1st Bn)
8. Valorous Unit Award (Army) for IRAQ 2003-2004 (1st Bn)
9. Meritorious Unit Commendation (Army) for IRAQ 2010-2011 (1st Bn)
10. Superior Unit Award (Army) for Operation ATLANTIC RESOLVE in Poland and the Baltic States 2017 (1st Bn)
11. Republic of Korea Presidential Unit Citation for INCHON to HUNGNAM (Company A, 56th Amphibious Tank and Tractor Bn), 1952 (A/1st Bn)(DA GO 8, 1952)
12. Republic of Korea Presidential Unit Citation for KOREA (56th Amphibious Tank and Tractor Bn), 1952 (1st, 2nd, 3rd Bn) (DA GO 23, 1954)
13. French Croix de Guerre with Silver Gilt Star for Han-sur-Nied, France (Company B, 68th Tank Bn cited).

== History of the Silver Lions ==
The 'Silver Lions" of 1st Battalion, 68th Armor Regiment, were the only armor battalion located on Fort Carson, with 48 M1A1 Abrams Main Battle Tanks, 32 Armored Personnel Carriers, Over 50 Tactical Wheeled vehicles, 5 Tracked Maintenance/Recovery vehicles and over 600 personnel. 1–68 Armor had 4 Companies (HHC, A, B, and C), with 14 M1A1 Main Battle Tanks in each Line Company (A, B, and C). To Support the 3 line Companies there was Headquarters and Headquarters Company (HHC), the largest of the four Companies with over 300 personnel. Located in HHC were platoons of Cavalry Reconnaissance, Mortar, Maintenance, Headquarters, Signal, Supply, Intelligence, Cooks, Chemical, Administration and Medics for the Battalion.

Before the Force XXI Concept, 1st Battalion, 68th Armor had 5 companies (HHC, A, B, C and D). On 13 April 2000, A Company was deactivated, turning all 14 tanks to the Mississippi National Guard. D Company was deactivated on 14 April 2000 and re-flagged as A Company, leaving the battalion with the standard four companies, rather than five.

== Current organization of 1–68 ==
Upon return from deployment to OIF 1, the 4th Infantry Division immediately began reorganization into the "modular brigade" structure of the new U.S. Army. 4th Infantry Division was again deployed to OIF in late 2005, replacing 3rd ID in Baghdad. The 3rd Brigade was attached to the 101st and the 1–68 was sent to Baqubah, Iraq.

After being reorganized under the modular concept, the 1st Battalion, 68th Armor Regiment became known as the 1st Combined Arms Battalion, 68th Armor Regiment. HHC, known as Havoc, with scouts, snipers, mortars, medics and staff positions. Alpha, known as Attack, and Bravo, known as Blackhawk, were designated as infantry companies with M2A3 Bradley fighting vehicles. Charlie company known as Cold Steel, and Delta, known as Destroyer, were set up as tank companies with 14 M1A2 Abrams main battle tanks each. Echo Company, known as Exile company, as an engineering company. Fox company, known as Forerunner, was attached from 64th Brigade Support Battalion to provide mess support, maintenance/recovery, and a supply distribution platoon. The final company is Golf Company, which is the rear-detachment company for the battalion when it is deployed.

The battalion's last Iraq deployment was to Basra, as a part of OIF 10–11.

Currently, the names of the assigned maneuver Companies and their primary functions are as follows:

Headhunter: Battalion Headquarters company consisting of staff sections, assigned medics, forward observers, mortarmen, snipers, and Battalion Scouts.

Apex: M1A2 Abrams tank company

Barbarian: M1A2 Abrams tank company

Chaos: M2A3 Bradley Fighting Vehicle and dismounted Infantry Combined Arms Company

== Notable Members ==
- Jeffrey Dahmer - 1978 - 1981 - 2nd Battalion as a medic
- William Gainey - 1996 - Command Sergeant Major of the 2nd Battalion, 68th Armored Regiment. Went on to be appointed the first Senior Enlisted Advisor to the Chairman of the Joint Chiefs of Staff.

== See also ==
- List of armored and cavalry regiments of the United States Army

== Sources ==
- Armor-Cavalry Part I: Regular Army and Army Reserve (Army Lineage Series CMH Pub 60-1), by Mary Lee Stubbs and Stanley Russell Connor. Center for Military History, Washington, DC, originally printed in 1969, 1984.
- Army War College Historical Section (1988a) [1931]. The American Expeditionary Forces: General Headquarters, Armies, Army Corps, Services of Supply, Separate Forces (PDF). Order of Battle of the United States Land Forces in the World War. Vol. I. CMH Pub 23-1. Washington, D.C.: United States Army Center of Military History. OCLC 183412729. Archived from the original (PDF) on 13 February 2015.
- Super Sixth: The story of Patton's 6th Armored Division in WW II
- United States Army in World War II; The War in the Pacific; Campaign In the Marianas; Philip A. Crowl, 1959.
- Army Amphibian Tractor and Tank Battalions in the Battle of SAIPAN
- Tactical Units of Northern Troops and Landing Force on Saipan
- After action report, 773rd Amphibious Tractor Battalion: 25 May 44 thru 4 Aug 44 - TINIAN
- 56th Amphibious Tank and Tractor Battalion History
- USA Airborne - 50th Anniversary, Turner, 1990 ISBN 978-0938021902
- Fort Bragg ceremony marks return of 68th Armor Regiment. 2018.
- Army General Orders Unit Award Index
- Organizational Actions Of Units To Form The 68th Armor Regiment Under The US Army Regimental System (GO 35, 20 July 1983)
- The Combat Arms Regimental System: Questions and Answers, 1978
- US Army Regimental System, 2017.
