= 8th Armored Division (United States) =

WW2 US Army formation

- 8th Armored Division shoulder sleeve insignia
- Active: 1 April 1942 – 14 November 1945
- Country: United States
- Branch: United States Army
- Type: Armor
- Role: Armored warfare
- Size: Division
- Nickname: "Thundering Herd" or "Iron Snake"
- Engagements: World War II; Rhineland; Ardennes-Alsace; Central Europe

Insignia
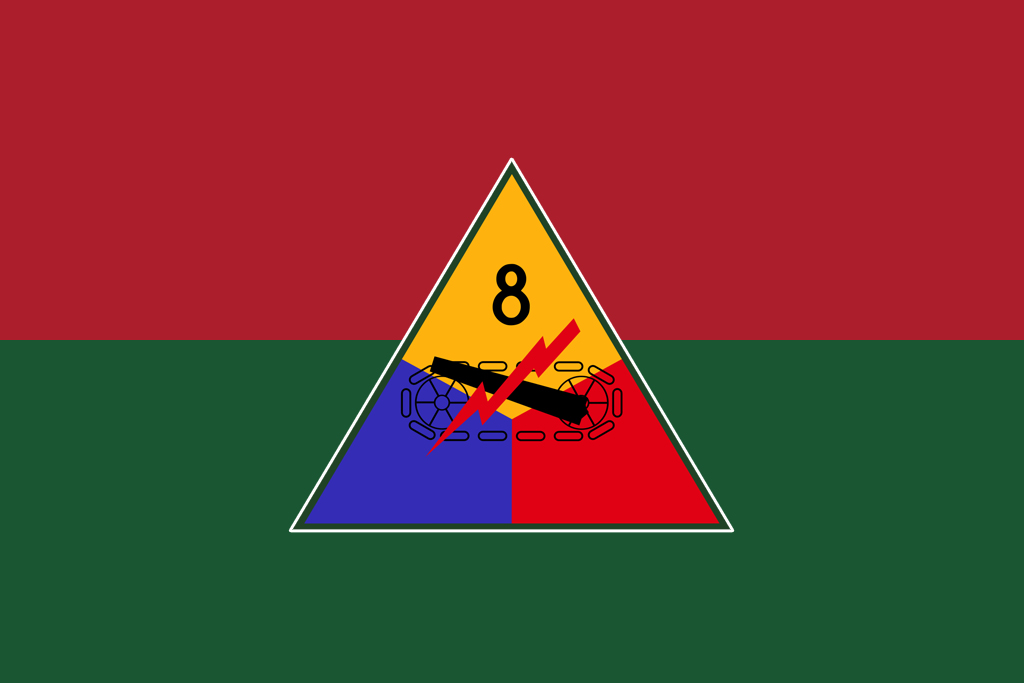
- Flag of the United States Army 8th Armored Division

The 8th Armored Division was an armored division of the United States Army that served in the European Theater of World War II.

== History ==
=== Stateside ===
The successes of the Nazi German Army's armored units in Poland and France underscored the need for an effective U.S. armored force. The tank battles of North Africa and Russia in early 1942 caused the US Army to recognize the need to drastically increase the number of its armored units. The 8th Armored Division was activated in the Army of the United States on 1 April 1942 at Fort Knox, Kentucky, with "surplus" units of the recently reorganized 4th Armored Division and newly organized units. The division served as the first official military guardian of the gold vault at Fort Knox. From 1942 to 1944 it functioned as a training command stationed at Camp Polk, Louisiana. During this period the 8th supplied trained personnel to the 9th through 14th Armored Divisions. In September 1943 the division completed reorganization from the old style triangular division to the new 'light' armored division, as per War Department Letter AG-322, in preparation for activation as a combat unit. The light format armored division was made up of three combat commands referred to as Combat Command A (CCA), Combat Command B (CCB) and a smaller unit called Combat Command Reserve (CCR). Units could be assigned to one of the combat commands at need, creating a very flexible formation.

US Infantrymen undergoing rifle instruction

During December 1943, the division participated in the D Series of exercises in Texas. The D Series were small scale maneuver problems designed as a precursor to the full scale Sixth Louisiana Maneuver Period. The D Series included exercises to simulate contact with the enemy and included recon, movement to contact, engineering and minefield clearing problems. The 8th completed the D Series and participated in the Sixth Louisiana Maneuver Period from February through April 1944 as part of the Red Force.

From the period of April through October 1944, the division conducted post-maneuver training, losing a number of trained personnel to other units and absorbing and training their replacements. At the end of October the 8th received movement orders to Camp Kilmer, New York in preparation for shipment overseas. On 6 November 1944 the division left Camp Kilmer and boarded ships in New Jersey for the United Kingdom. The ships arrived in Southampton on 18 November and the division moved to Tidworth Camp, joining the newly formed Fifteenth Army.

=== England, France and 'The Bulge' ===
After some additional training and acquisition of new equipment at Tidworth, England, the 8th Armored Division landed in France, 5 January 1945, at Le Havre and Rouen. The division assembled in the Bacqueville area of upper Normandy as part of the (then still secret) Fifteenth Army and was placed in reserve. In mid-January the division was seconded to the Third Army and raced 350 miles (560 km) across France through heavy snow and ice to Pont-à-Mousson to help stem the German drive for Strasbourg, part of the German Operation Nordwind It was at this point that the division was assigned the call-sign 'Tornado'. A detachment of the 88th Armored Cavalry undertook the division's first combat action – a reconnaissance of the best route to contact with the enemy. The division, finding the enemy already halted and beginning to fall back, took part in the Third Army drive against the Moselle-Saar salient. The 8th supported the 94th Infantry Division's attack on Nennig, Berg and Sinz, 19–28 January 1945 aimed at reducing the salient between the Saar and Moselle Rivers.

=== Belgium and The Netherlands ===
US soldiers in the Netherlands, January 1945, showing the conditions men of the 8th had to contend with in their march across France and the Low Countries.

Nennig and Berg were defended by elements of the German 11th Panzer Division; specifically the 110th, 111th and elements of the 774th Panzer Grenadier Regiments. German losses in action against 8th Armored units were 5 Panzer IV tanks, 72 prisoners and many dead and wounded. 8th Armored losses were 3 M4A3 Sherman tanks, 4 Half-tracks and heavy personnel casualties.

From Berg, the 8th continued their advance through Sinz and more heavy fighting. German losses were 8 tanks, 1 anti-aircraft gun, 1 anti-tank gun and 1 half-track. Division losses were an additional 6 tanks destroyed and 4 disabled as well as heavy personnel casualties. The week's action resulted in the loss of 50% of the personnel the 110th and 111th Panzer-Grenadier Regiments had brought into the Saar-Moselle triangle.

The division moved to Simpelveld, the Netherlands for rest and refitting absorbing approximately 200 replacements. The 8th was now part of the Ninth Army and continued refitting and replacing losses during the first half of February 1945. On 19 February the division moved to Roermond, the Netherlands to relieve the British 7th Armoured Division in the vicinity of Echt and launched a diversionary attack as part of Operation Grenade, pushing the enemy north of the Heide woods and east of the Roer River.

=== The Roer to the Rhine ===
On 27 February, 8th Armored crossed the Roer River via the Hilfarth Bridge which had been captured by the 35th Infantry Division. CCA headed for the town of Wegberg. CCB moved through Sittard, Gangelt, Geilenkirchen, Randerath, and Brachelen to arrive at the Hilfarth Bridge and crossed after CCA. CCA tanks and infantry destroyed fifteen pillboxes, captured Tetelrath, and crossed the Schwalm river while CCB attacked and captured the towns of Arsbeck and Ober Kruchten.

On 2 March – CCA captured Lobberich, moved through the 35th Inf. Div. and secured the town of Wachtendonk at the confluence of Niers River and Nette River. Co. C of the 53rd Engineers worked through the night to bridge the Niers River which was holding up the advance on Moers.

3 March CCB moved through CCA area and captured Aldekerk while CCR captured Saint Hubert, Vinnbruck and Saelhuysen in their advance toward Moers. The Division received orders to cease forward movement as it was 'pinched out' by the 35th Inf. on the right and the 84th Inf. on the left.

CCB was detached and assigned to the 35th Inf. Div. so an attack could be mounted in the direction of Rheinberg and Wesel to prevent the Germans from crossing the Rhine River. CCB attacked Lintfort and Rheinberg with the 35th. Heavy fighting, primarily against the 130th Panzer Division, took place in and around Rheinberg resulting in 199 divisional casualties and the loss of 41 tanks while the Germans suffered 350 men killed and 512 taken prisoner. The area (nicknamed '88 Lane') was under direct anti-tank and heavy artillery fire so each house had to be cleared by dismounted infantry. By 7 March a foothold was secured at Grunthal, a road crossing (B 57/B 58) in the vicinity of Alpen.

The same day the US 9th Armored Division captured a bridge over the Rhine at Remagen. The 130th Panzer Division was pulled out of the Wesel area and moved south to counterattack. By 9 March CCB of the 8th secured the town of Ossenberg as well as the towns of Borth and Wallach. CCB was relieved at 2400 and ordered to the Venlo, the Netherlands, rest area, the relief being completed on 10 and 11 March.

The division was assigned to cleanup operations in the rear areas of the Rhineland which had been bypassed during the movement to the Rhine River. During this period the division became the first US or British unit to uncover the existence of the secret Werwolf organization when several cleverly camouflaged bunkers were discovered, each containing 12 to 15 fully equipped German soldiers.

On 22 March division artillery units moved into firing positions in preparation for the assault on the east bank of the Rhine River as part of Operation Plunder. On 23 March all artillery units commenced firing over 130,000 rounds preceding the initial crossing of the Rhine River to be made by the 30th Infantry Division.

=== The Rhine to the Ruhr ===
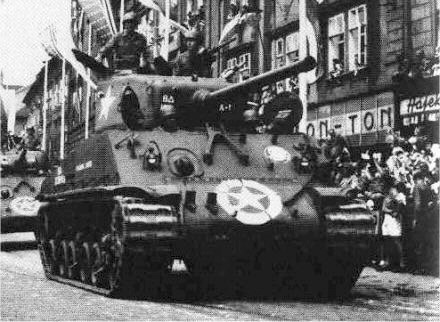
8th Armored M4A3 76(w) HVSS Sherman Tank

On 24 March 18 Tank Bn of the 8th Armored Division was ferried across in support of the 30th Infantry prior to the Division's crossing. An 18th tank was the first across the Rhine in the 9th Army area and assisted in the capture of Spellen, the first town captured east of the Rhine by 9th Army. The division was the first armored division to cross the Rhine in the 9th Army area, crossing at bridge sites 'G' and 'H'.

The 8th received orders on 27 March to secure the road running from Hamm to Soest. CCA attacked on the left flank and captured Im Loh then moved on to bypass Dorsten. Heavy house to house fighting slowed the attack. New orders were received late in the next day to capture Dorsten so that the Lippe River could be bridged allowing armor to move northward.

In the meantime, CCR, located near Bruckhausen launched an attack on Zweckel and Kirchhellen to the south on 28 March. The 116th Panzer Division was defending both and the approaches had been heavily mined. CCR captured Zweckel in the afternoon and launched an attack on Kirchellen which was secured by nightfall. An advance unit of the 80th Tank battalion that had been surrounded in Kirchellen since early that morning was relieved.

CCA captured Dorsten early the next morning and CCB moved in to secure the area so CCA could join CCR in their advance to the east towards the town of Marl. Marl was cleared by nightfall. CCA then swung southeast from Dorsten heading for Polsum. CCR attacked and captures the towns of Scholven and Feldhausen. On 29 March the German 180th Volks Grenadier Division and the 116th Panzer Division withdrew and set up new defensive lines running through the fortress town of Recklinghausen.

CCR crossed the Rappholtz-Muhlen Canal on 30 March and captured Buer-Hassel. Co. C, 53 Armored Engineers built a bridge across the canal in just 44 minutes. The next day CCR captured Kolonie Bertlich. Heading east, it passed through Westerholt and Langenbochum, engaging the German defenses in Recklinghausen only 2,500 yards (2,300 m) away.

On 31 March the division was relieved by units of the 75th Inf. Div. The 8th crossed the Lippe River, and assembled at Selm. The 8th received orders on 1 April from XIX Corps to set up two spearheads for an attack to the east, the 2nd Armored and 30th Infantry in one and the 8th Armored and 83rd Infantry in the other. CCA was assigned to attack Delbrück, CCB to attack Paderborn.

The 8th launched its attack on schedule but CCB was soon stalled by fierce German resistance at Neuhaus. On 3 April fighter-bombers (known as Jabos by the troops) of the US 9th Air Corps provided close air support in the Teutoburg Forest and Neuhaus areas. CCR and moved up to attack Elsen to help CCB repel a strong German counterattack launched from Sennelager. CCA attacked Sennelager directly in an attempt to reduce a German strongpoint.

At the end of 3 April the division was relieved by the 83rd Inf. Div. and received orders to attack towards the west to help reduce the Ruhr Pocket.

=== Ruhr Pocket ===
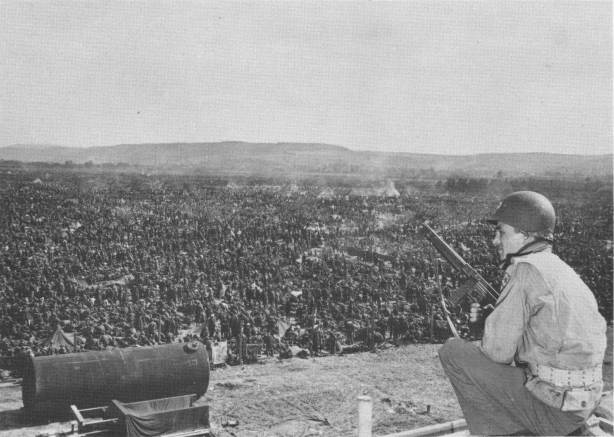
US soldier guarding German prisoners taken during the Ruhr Pocket Battle

The success of the Rhine crossing operations by Allied forces encircled approximately 430,000 German soldiers of Army Group B comprising 21 divisions of the Wehrmacht, trapping them in an area that came to be known as the Ruhr Pocket. The Twelfth Army Group was tasked with reducing the pocket.

On 3 April 8 turned 180 degrees in response to orders into the Ruhr Pocket and CCR attacked west toward Recklinghausen. CCR captured the towns of Stripe and Norddorf, and continued through Vollinghausen, Oberhagen, and Ebbinghausen before stopping for the night in front of Horne. The next day CCA attacked Erwitte. The US 9th Air Force continued to provide close air support as the division continued into the Ruhr Pocket through heavy fighting in the Lippstadt area.

Col. Wallace, the commander of CCR, was captured by German forces during the night of 4 April. On 5 April Col. Vesely assumed command of CCR and continued to attack westward capturing the towns of Horne, Klieve, Schmerlacke and Serlinghausen. At the end of the day, CCB relieved CCR and attacked westward toward Soest; capturing the towns of Schallen and Lohne while CCA continued attacking south capturing the towns of Anroechte, Mensel, Drewer, and Altenruthen. On 6 April, CCB made a 25-mile (40 km) 'end run' around Soest to the outskirts of Ost Onnen to cut off a German breakout path from the Ruhr pocket.

While CCB blocked the German withdrawal near Ost Onnen, CCA cleared the area north of the Moehne River so glider troops could be landed in case of a break-out attempt in that area. They captured the towns of Wamel, Brullinggsen, Ellingsen, and Westendorf. CCR, in the meantime, outposted all roads northeast of Soest to facilitate an attack on the town by the 94th Inf. Div.

On 7 April the eastward movement of the US 2nd Armored Division and the westward movement of the 8th Armored created a gap of 180 miles (290 km) between the two fronts. This would allow German forces to briefly cut off the US 2nd Armored. Troop A, 88th Reconnaissance Squadron captured the Moehne Talsperre Dam on the 7th to prevent the Germans from flooding the Moehne Valley. CCB began an attack on Werl in the afternoon and captured Gerlingen. The burgomeister of Ost Onnen surrendered the town later that day. The following day CCR moved to secure the road between Werl and Wickede and captured the towns of Parsit, Bremen, Vierhausen, Schluckingen and Wiehagen capturing 238 German soldiers, 1 Tiger tank, and 3 88 mm anti-tank guns. CCB captured Werl by late afternoon after heavy resistance during the day. They then captured Ost Buederich by the end of the day.

By 9 April, The threat of a German breakout had passed due to the buildup of allied troops in the area. CCB moved on Unna capturing Holtun and Hemmerude. The following day CCB continued the attack on Unna and captured Lernen. A ten-minute air strike was laid on Unna to soften it up. The Germans moved reinforcements, including Hitler Youth into Unna from the Muelhausen garrison.

On 10 April CCR advanced 7,000 yards (6,400 m) in fierce fighting and secured Stentrop, Bausenhagen, Scheda, Beutrap Wemen, and Fromern. The following day CCA joined the attack on Unna and CCB went into reserve. CCB had suffered 198 casualties this period. The next day CCR captured Hohenheide and Fröndenberg after an air strike drove 4 German tanks out of the town. The town of Billmerich was also captured. Unna finally fell that afternoon after another air strike. The Germans lost 160 personnel, 2 tanks and a battery of 88's. This surrender was the end of organized resistance from the 116th Panzer Division.

CCA continued cleaning up operations in Unna while CCR captured the towns of Hengsen, Ostendorf, Ottendorf, and Dellwig. CCA was relieved on 13 April and ordered to move east of Unna across the Weser River to the vicinity of Wolfenbüttel. CCA had lost 2 tanks, 1 half-track and 1 jeep during these operations. CCB was assigned to protect right flank of the 2nd Armored and the 83rd Inf. Div. as they moved east. They move 170 miles (270 km) to Wolfenbüttel. Later CCR was relieved and ordered to move to the vicinity of Denstorf. On the drive west, CCR suffered 203 casualties and lost 11 tanks, 3 jeeps, 9 half-tracks. The German forces lost 6 Mark V Panther tanks, 4 20 mm guns, 1 large railroad gun, and 3 tons of small arms.

=== Central Germany ===
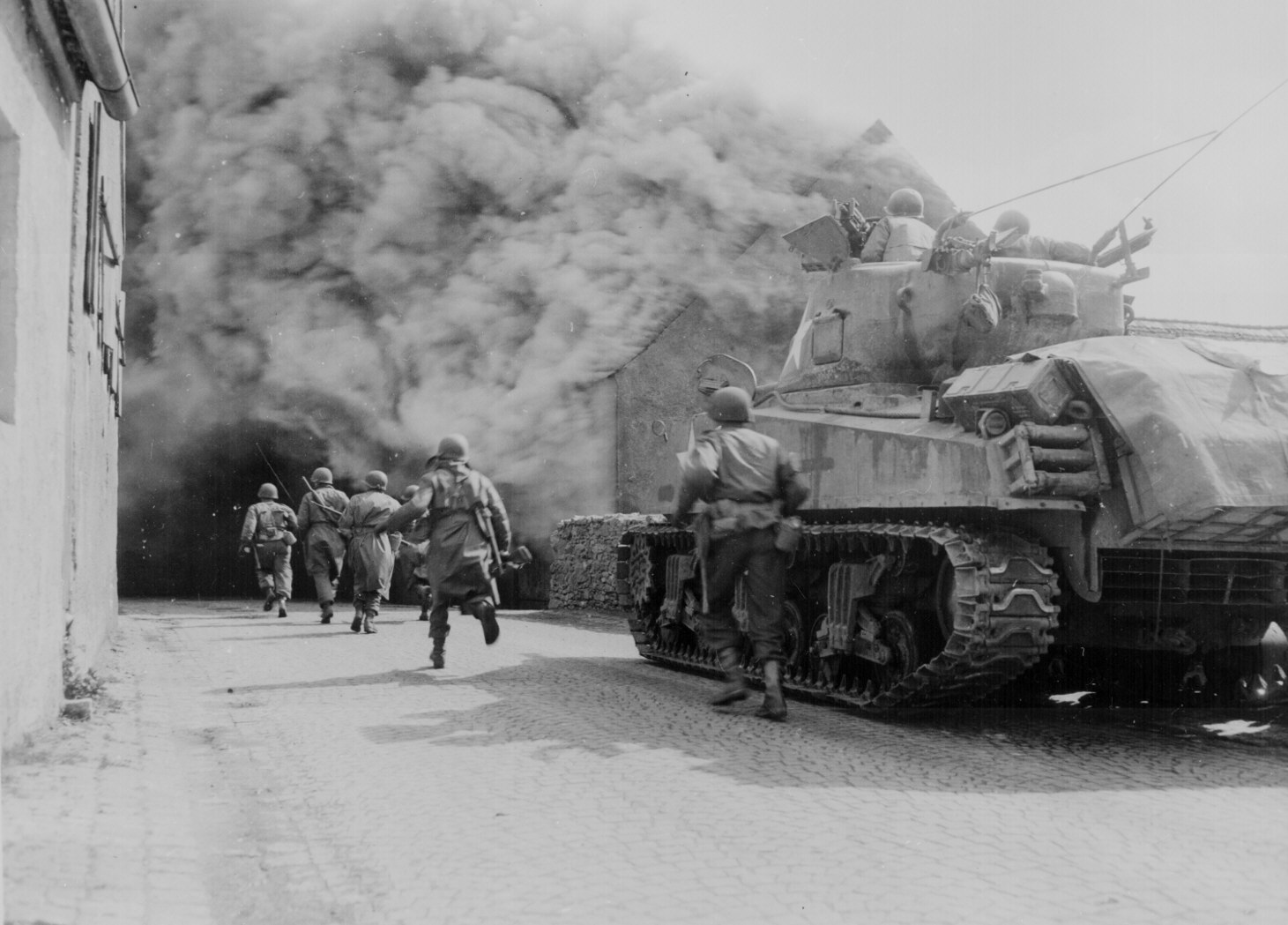
US Armored Infantrymen advance past an M4A3 Sherman tank in Central Germany, April 1945

After leaving the Ruhr Pocket on 13 April the division moved east. The 8th participated in the liberation of the Halberstadt-Zwieberge concentration camps near Langenstein (see below). Most of CCB moved on to Halberstadt with some units remaining in Wolfenbüttel until the rest of the Division arrived. On 14 April the remaining units of the Division began moving to an assembly area in the vicinity of Braunschweig with CCA going to Wolfenbüttel and CCR going to Denstorf.

For the period of 15–18 April CCB cleared the area near the Hartz Mountains of remnants of the 11th Panzer Army while CCA began moving to Seehausen to support the attack on Magdeburg by the XIX Corps. CCR moved from Denstorf to Braunschweig and continued screening the rear areas.

CCB completed clearing resistance from the edge of Forest Heimburg south of Derenburg while units of the 2nd Armored relieved CCR allowing it to move into the vicinity of Stroebeck in preparation for reducing resistance in Blankenburg. On 19 April CCA was relieved and returned to Wernigerode from Seehausen where it in turn relieved the 330th Inf. Reg. of the 83rd Inf. Div. CCB moved to Westerhausen and CCR moved to Aspenstedt to clear the remaining woods around Blankenburg. The next day the division began to attack Blankenburg. At 1000 hours a 13 plane squadron attacked Blankenburg and immediately afterward the burgomeister was contacted about surrendering after a show of force. By nightfall, most of Blankenburg had surrendered except for a few strongpoints that comprised fanatical resisters unwilling to lay down their arms or soldiers who had not yet received word to surrender.

On 21 April CCR cleared the woods south of Blankenburg and linked up with elements of the 1st Inf. Div. of the First Army. By 22 April the last organized resistance ended with the capture of Gen. Heinz Kokott, commanding officer of the 26th Volks Grenadier Div and brother-in-law of Gestapo chief Heinrich Himmler.

During the period of 23 April through 8 May the division was assigned an area of 90 kilometers long by 30 kilometers wide and went into occupation duty. Some additional cleanup was required of small pockets of resistance as stragglers were found.

=== Zwieberge concentration camps ===
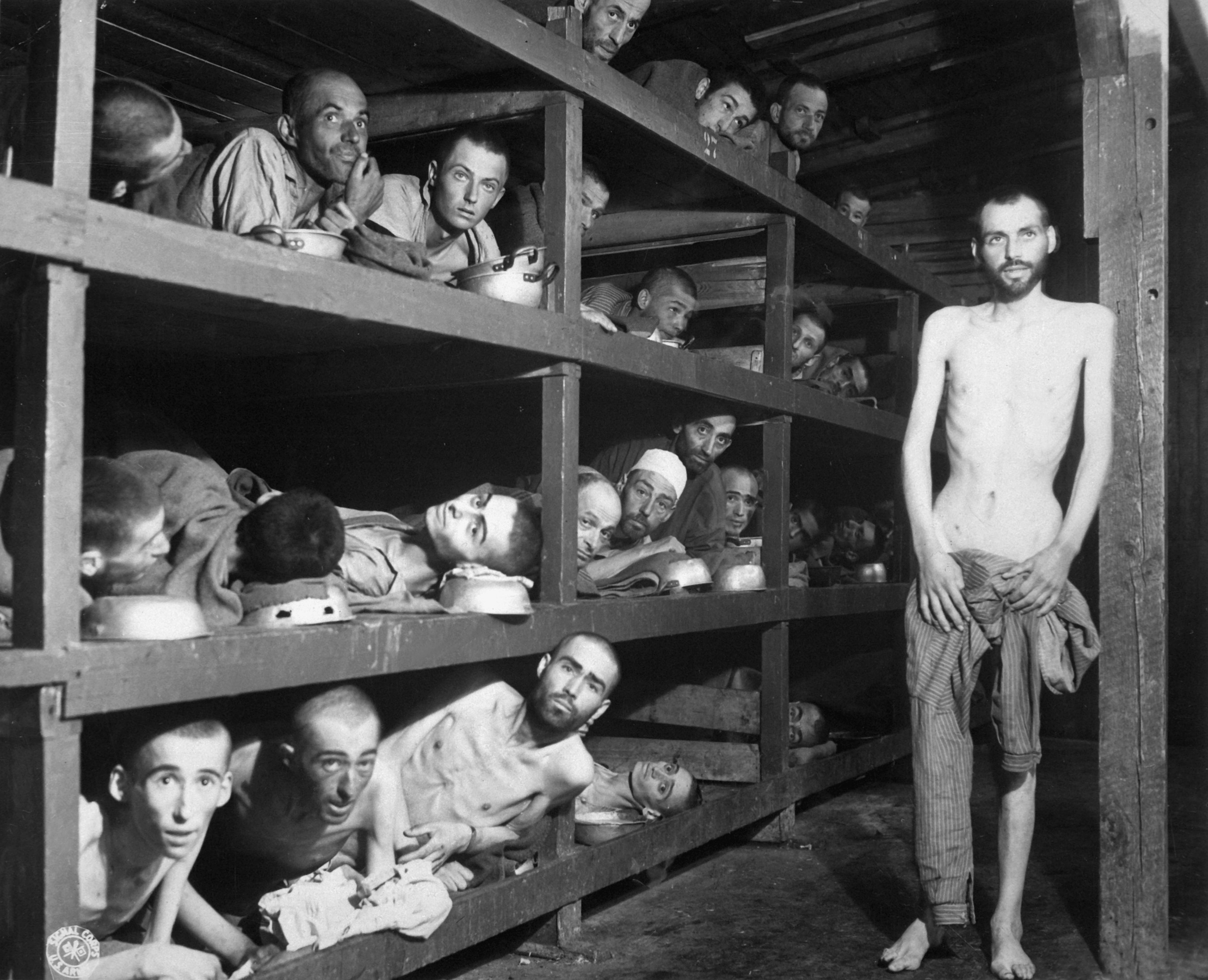
Newly liberated inmates of one of the Buchenwald slave-labor subcamps.

The 8th liberated Halberstadt-Zwieberge, a subcamp of the Buchenwald concentration camp, between 12 and 17 April 1945 during its drive through central Germany. The area around the city of Halberstadt housed a number of Buchenwald subcamps that had been established in 1944 to provide labor for the German war effort, including Halberstadt-Zwieberge I and Halberstadt-Zwieberge II. More than 5,000 inmates were incarcerated in these two subcamps, where they were forced to hollow out massive tunnels and build underground factories for Junkers Aircraft of Aircraft Motors Construction Company, which produced military aircraft.

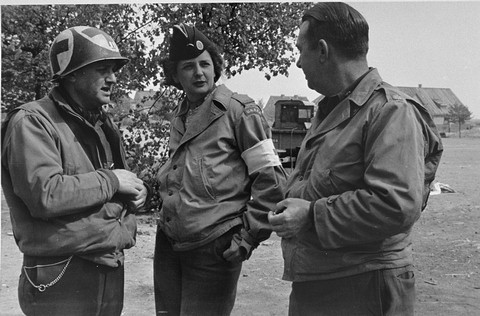
Medical personnel stand outside a school that has been converted into a hospital for concentration camp survivors from Langenstein-Zwieberge. On the left is Cpt. Joseph Lyten, a dentist from the 8th Armored Division medical battalion.

Buchenwald administered at least 87 subcamps located across Germany, from Düsseldorf in the Rhineland to the border with the Protectorate of Bohemia and Moravia in the east. Prisoners in the satellite camps were put to work mostly in armaments factories, in stone quarries, and on construction projects. Periodically, prisoners throughout the Buchenwald camp system underwent selection. The SS staff sent those too weak or disabled to continue working to the Bernburg or Sonnenstein killing centers, where they were killed by gas. Other weakened prisoners were killed by phenol injections administered by the camp doctor.

Of interest is that all details regarding the camp were sealed and classified by the US Government; presumably because of the camp's involvement with an improved version of the V-1 flying bomb. In 1997, the information was declassified through the efforts of a former 8th Armored Division officer, Dr. Bernard Metrick. The records confirmed the role of the division in liberating the camp and the division's flag was added to those on display at the U.S. Holocaust Museum honoring those who liberated the death camps.

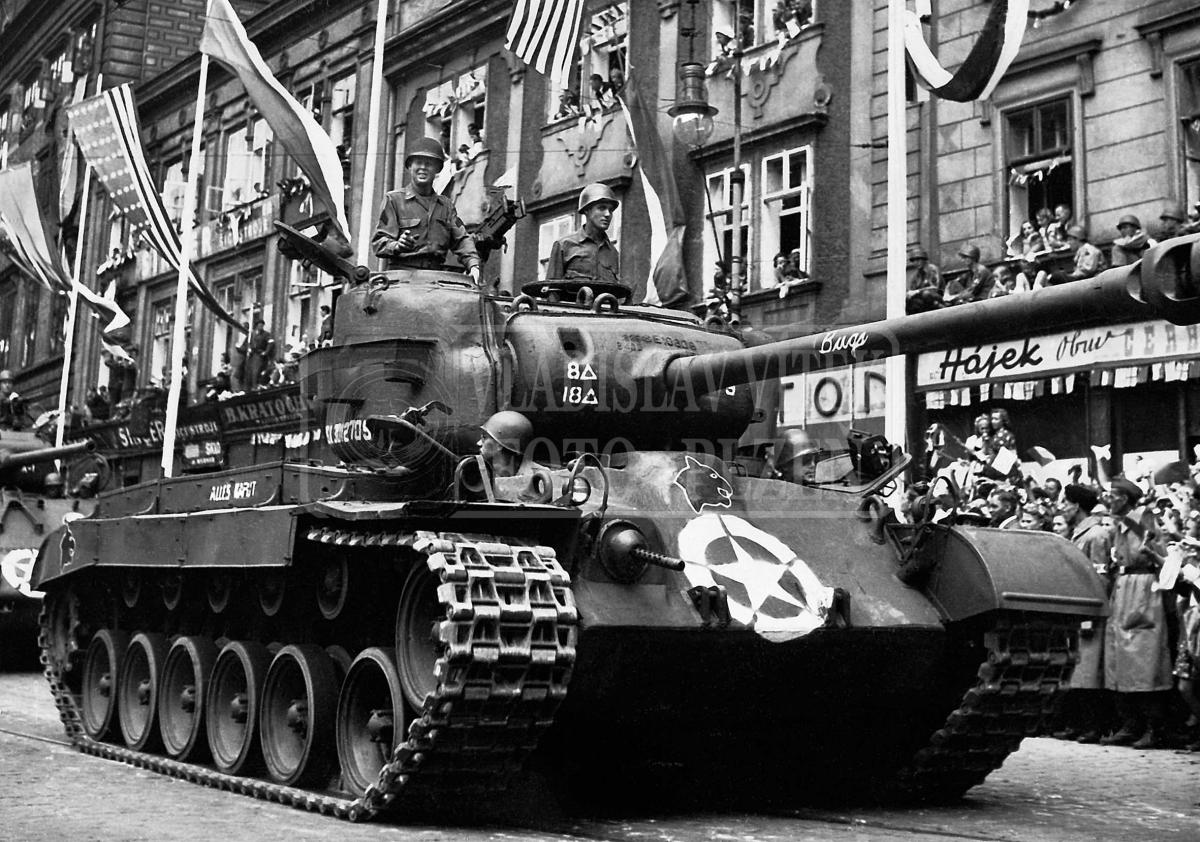
8th Armored M26 Pershing Tank

The general end of hostilities unfortunately did not mean the end of casualties for the 8th Armored. On 1 May the 58th Inf. lost two men to snipers who had to be killed since they would not surrender. The next day the 58th Inf. lost an officer and three more men when a powder plant blew up in Munchshaf. Sabotage was suspected. It is believed that these were the last official wartime casualties of the division.

=== Post war ===
From 8 May through 30 May the division remained on occupation duty and continued to clean up stragglers and small pockets of resistance. On 30 May the division was assigned to Third Army. It was relieved by units of the British Army and began its move to the city of Pilsen in western Czechoslovakia. From 1 June through 19 September, many men were sent home under the point system. Those remaining were sent to various I & E (Information and Education) training schools. Very little other training was done.

On 19 September the division began the 600-mile (970 km) trip to Camp Oklahoma City near Rheims, France, for deployment home. On 26 October the division traveled 180 miles (290 km) from Camp Oklahoma City to Camp Phillip Morris at Le Havre, France, and the division was officially dismounted. The division was inactivated on 13 November 1945 at Camp Patrick Henry, Virginia by Gen. Charles F. Colson.

There is an official 8th Armored Division memorial at the American Cemetery in the city of Margraten, The Netherlands

=== Casualties ===
- Total battle casualties: 2,011
- Killed in action: 393
- Wounded in action: 1,572
- Missing in action: 5
- Prisoner of war: 41

== Nickname ==
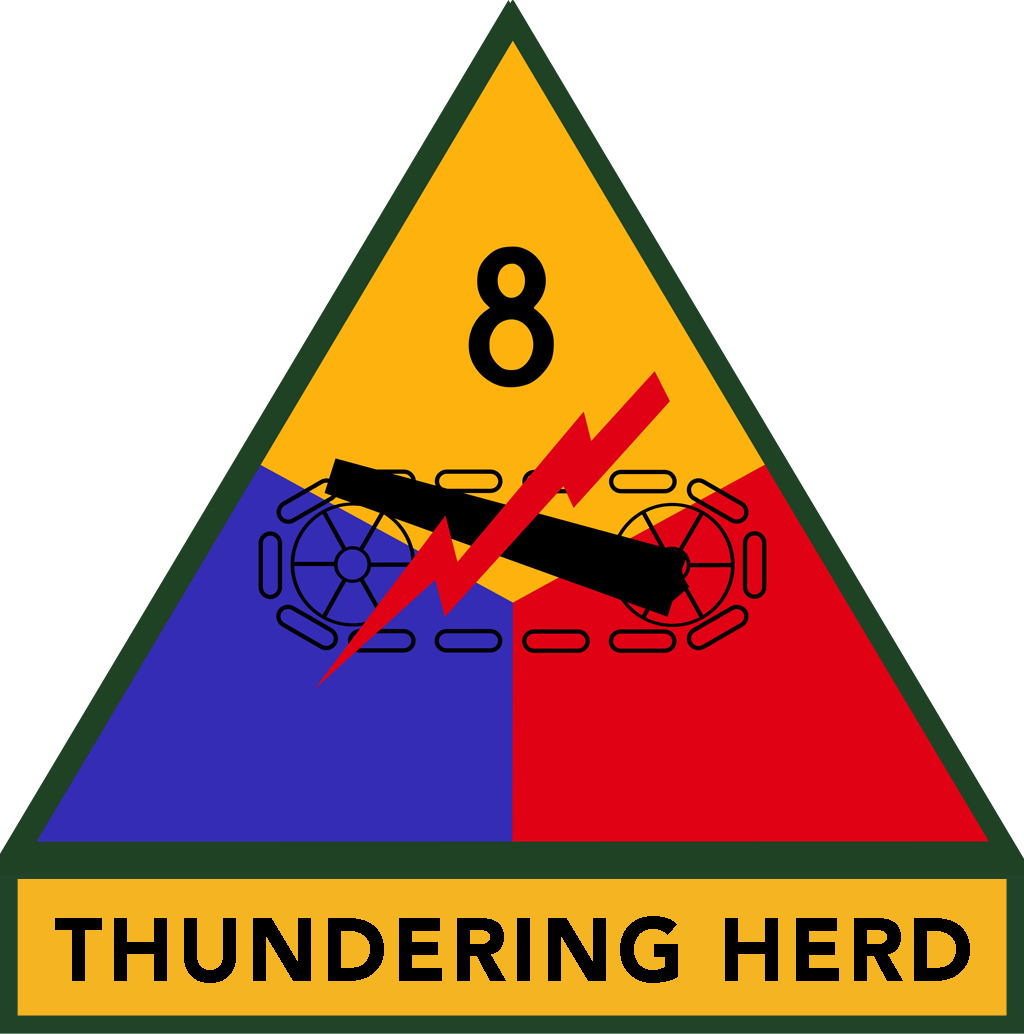
8th Armored Division "Thundering Herd" Insignia

The nickname of the 8th Armored Division, the "Thundering Herd", was coined before the division went to Europe in late 1944. It was also known as the "Iron Snake" late in the war, after a correspondent for Newsweek likened the 8th to a "great ironclad snake" as it crossed the Rhine River in late March 1945. The division is also sometimes referred to as Tornado – its wartime tactical call sign.

== Commander ==
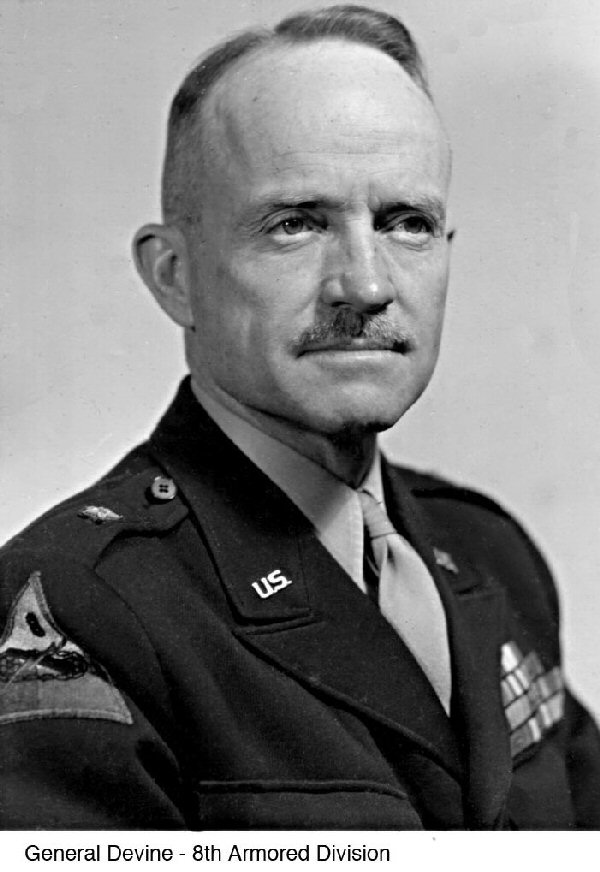
Major General John Devine

Major General William Grimes 1942–1944

- Grimes left the division on 6 October 1944 just prior to the division's shipment overseas. Grimes went on to serve as Commandant of the Cavalry School at Fort Riley, Kansas.

Major General John M. Devine 1944–45

- Devine was personally selected by Gen. Eisenhower to command the 8th Armored. His prior assignment was Commanding General, Combat Command B, 7th Armored Division. He had been in combat continuously from D-Day plus 2 (8 June 1944) when he landed at Normandy as artillery commander of the 90th Infantry Division.

== Division organization ==
=== Heavy armored division ===
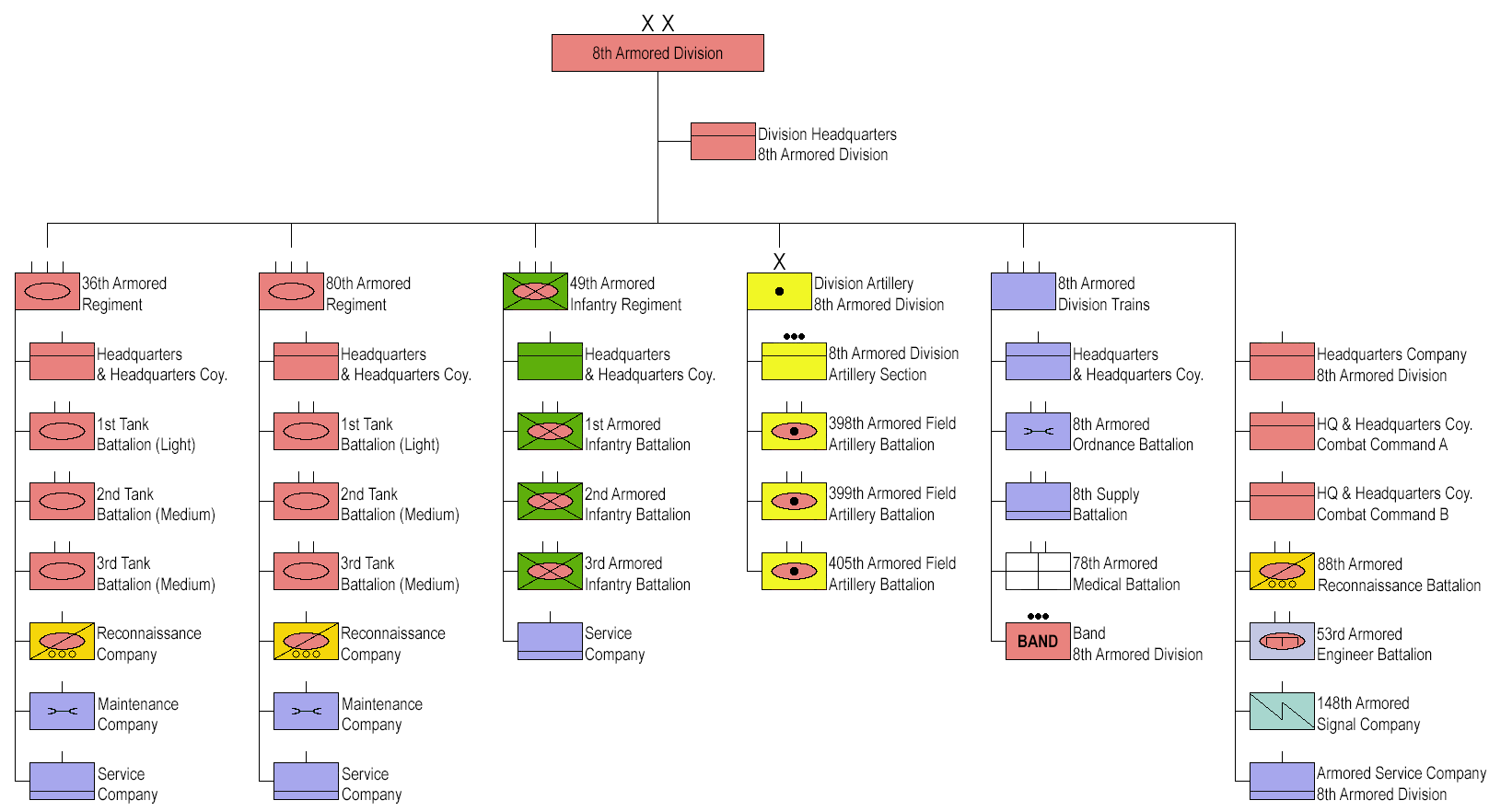
8th Armored Division organization after the division's activation (click to enlarge)

The division was activated as a heavy armored division in 1942. At the time the 8th Armored Division was composed of the following units:

- 8th Armored Division
  - Division Headquarters
  - Headquarters Company, 8th Armored Division
  - Headquarters and Headquarters Company, Combat Command A
  - Headquarters and Headquarters Company, Combat Command B
  - 148th Armored Signal Company
  - Armored Service Company (includes the division's Military Police Platoon)
  - 36th Armored Regiment
    - Headquarters and Headquarters Company
    - Reconnaissance Company (M3 scout cars and T30 HMC self propelled guns)
    - Maintenance Company
    - Service Company
    - 1st Tank Battalion (Light)
      - Headquarters and Headquarters Company
      - 3× Light Tank companies (A, B, C) (M3/M5 Stuart light tanks)
    - 2nd Tank Battalion (Medium)
      - Headquarters and Headquarters Company
      - 3× Medium Tank companies (D, E, F) (M4 Sherman tanks)
    - 3rd Tank Battalion (Medium)
      - Headquarters and Headquarters Company
      - 3× Medium Tank companies (G, H, I) (M4 Sherman tanks)
  - 80th Armored Regiment (transferred from the 4th Armored Division)
    - same organization as 36th Armored Regiment
  - 49th Armored Infantry Regiment
    - Headquarters and Headquarters Company
    - 3× Armored infantry battalions
      - each battalion consists of: 1× Headquarters and Headquarters Company, 3× Rifle companies on M3 half-tracks
    - Service Company
  - 88th Armored Reconnaissance Battalion
    - Headquarters and Headquarters Company
    - 3× Reconnaissance companies (M3 scout cars)
    - Light Tank Company (M3/M5 Stuart light tanks)
  - 53rd Armored Engineer Battalion
    - Headquarters and Headquarters Company
    - 4× Armored engineer companies
    - Bridge Company
  - 8th Armored Division Artillery
    - 8th Armored Division Artillery Section
    - 398th Armored Field Artillery Battalion
      - Headquarters and Headquarters Battery
      - 3× Field artillery batteries (M7 Priest self propelled howitzers)
      - Service Battery
    - 399th Armored Field Artillery Battalion
      - same organization as 398th Armored Field Artillery Battalion
    - 406th Armored Field Artillery Battalion
      - same organization as 398th Armored Field Artillery Battalion
  - 8th Armored Division Trains
    - Headquarters and Headquarters Company
    - 14th Armored Ordnance Battalion
      - Headquarters and Headquarters Company
      - 3× Maintenance companies
    - 14th Supply Battalion
      - Headquarters and Headquarters Company
      - 2× Truck companies
    - 78th Armored Medical Battalion
      - Headquarters and Headquarters Company
      - 3× Medical companies
    - 8th Armored Division Band

=== Light armored division ===
Early in 1943, the Army Ground Force began a series of studies to reorganize the various divisions within the Army. After reviewing the tables of organization and after allowing the various commands to review and comment on the proposed restructure, the War Department published on 15 September 1943 a new armored division tables of organization. The restructuring removed the two armored regiments and armored infantry regiment from the table of organization and replaced them with three tank battalions and three armored infantry battalions. Each tank battalion included one light and three medium tank companies. Both Combat Commands, A and B, remained, but an additional Reserve Command was added to the organization. This was a small headquarters element of 10 personnel tasked to clarify command and control in the division's rear area. Armored engineer battalions lost their bridge companies, while their engineer companies were reduced from four to three. The division's cavalry reconnaissance squadron was increased in size to include an HQ Troop, four reconnaissance troops, a light tank company, and an assault gun troop of four platoons (one for each reconnaissance troop). Within the division trains, the division lost its supply battalion and the division's armored service company. These changes pared the division's strength from 14,630 men to 10,937, slashed the number of tanks from 360 to 263, reduced the variety of vehicles to ease repair problems, and eliminated the maintenance-prone motorcycles.

After its reorganization as a light armored division the 8th Armored Division was composed of the following units:

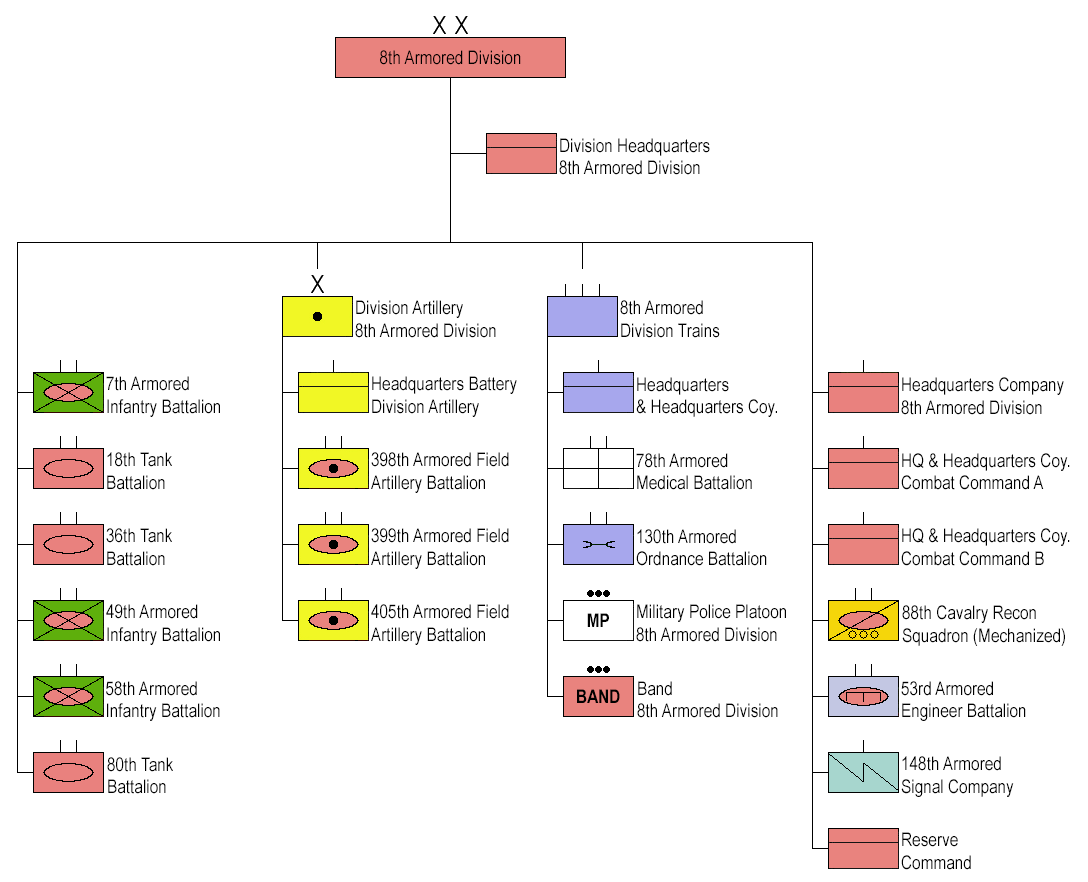
8th Armored Division organization after the division's reorganization (click to enlarge)

- 8th Armored Division
  - Division Headquarters
  - Headquarters Company, 8th Armored Division
  - Headquarters and Headquarters Company, Combat Command A
  - Headquarters and Headquarters Company, Combat Command B
  - 148th Armored Signal Company
  - Reserve Command
  - 18th Tank Battalion
    - Headquarters and Headquarters Company
    - 3× Medium Tank companies (M4 Sherman tanks)
    - Light Tank Company (M3/M5 Stuart or M24 Chaffee light tanks)
    - Service Company
  - 36th Tank Battalion
    - same organization as 18th Tank Battalion
  - 80th Tank Battalion
    - same organization as 18th Tank Battalion
  - 7th Armored Infantry Battalion
    - Headquarters and Headquarters Company
    - 3× Rifle companies (M3 half-tracks)
    - Service Company
  - 49th Armored Infantry Battalion
    - same organization as 7th Armored Infantry Battalion
  - 58th Armored Infantry Battalion
    - same organization as 7th Armored Infantry Battalion
  - 88th Cavalry Reconnaissance Squadron (Mechanized)
    - Headquarters and Headquarters and Service Troop
    - 4× Cavalry reconnaissance troops (M8 Greyhound armored cars)
    - Cavalry Assault Gun Troop (M8 Scott self propelled guns)
    - Light Tank Company (M3/M5 Stuart or M24 Chaffee light tanks)
  - 53rd Armored Engineer Battalion
    - Headquarters and Headquarters Company
    - 3× Armored engineer companies
  - 8th Armored Division Artillery
    - Headquarters and Headquarters Battery
    - 398th Armored Field Artillery Battalion
      - Headquarters and Headquarters Battery
      - 3× Field artillery batteries (M7 Priest self propelled howitzers)
      - Service Battery
    - 399th Armored Field Artillery Battalion
      - same organization as 398th Armored Field Artillery Battalion
    - 405th Armored Field Artillery Battalion
      - same organization as 398th Armored Field Artillery Battalion
  - 8th Armored Division Trains
    - Headquarters and Headquarters Company
    - 78th Armored Medical Battalion
      - Headquarters and Headquarters Company
      - 3× Medical companies
    - 130th Armored Ordnance Battalion
      - Headquarters and Headquarters Company
      - 3× Maintenance companies
    - Military Police Platoon
    - 8th Armored Division Band

== Unit commanders 24 October 1944 ==
Combat command organization, 1944–45

Combat Command A: Col. Charles F. Colson
7th Armored Infantry Battalion: Lt. Col. A. D. Poinier
18th Tank Battalion: Lt. Col. G. B. Goodrich
398th Arm'd Field Artillery Battalion: Lt. Col R. H. Dawson

Combat Command B: Col. Edward A. Kimball
49th Armored Infantry Battalion: Lt. Col. M. G. Roseborough
36th Tank Battalion: Lt. Col. J. H. Van Houten
399th Arm'd Field Artillery Battalion: Lt. Col. R. M. Lilly

Combat Command R: Col. Robert J. Wallace
58th Armored Infantry Battalion: Maj. George Artman
80th Tank Battalion: Maj. A. E. Walker
405th Arm'd Field Artillery Battalion: Lt. Col. William McLynn

Service battalions:
(attached by companies to Combat Commands)
53rd Armored Engineer Battalion: Lt. Col. E. T. Podufaly
78th Armored Medical Battalion: Lt. Col. P. D. Marx
88th Armored Reconnaissance Battalion: Lt. Col. T. B. Harrington
130th Armored Ordnance Battalion: Lt. Col. I. O. Drewry. Jr.
148th Armored Signal Company: Capt W. C. Jackson
508th CIC Detachment: Lt. A. J. Stanchick
Division Trains: Col. Y. D. Vesely
Division Artillery: Col. W. H. Holt
American Red Cross Field Director: Henry J. Broemsen
Military Police Platoon: Maj. W. H. Burger

Temporarily attached units
473rd AAA AW (SP) Battalion
809th Tank Destroyer Battalion

Strength and casualties

- Total Authorized Strength: 10,937
- Total battle casualties: 2,011
- Total deaths in battle: 469

== Armor ==
The primary striking force of the Armored Division was the tank. The 8th was composed of 3 tank battalions:

- 18th, 36th & 80th Tank Battalions

Each battalion comprised approximately 80 tanks and was organized as a headquarters unit and 6 companies:

- a Headquarters Company,
- a Service Company and
- 4 tank companies referred to as A, B, C and D companies

The headquarters unit was made up of the battalion command team and their vehicles; 3 M4A3 Sherman tanks (usually not used and held as a reserve) and various peeps (World War II US Armored divisions called the jeep a 'peep') and similar vehicles.

=== Headquarters Company (HQ Co) ===
The HQ Co was usually made up of:

- 1 platoon of 3 M4A3 Sherman tanks
- 1 platoon of 3 M4A3105 Sherman tanks.
  - These were M4A3's fitted with a 105 mm cannon and used as an assault gun.

=== Service Company ===
The Service Company contained special units like:

- Tank retrievers for recovering damaged tanks
- Tanks with plows and flails for clearing obstacles
- Medical Units

=== Tank companies ===
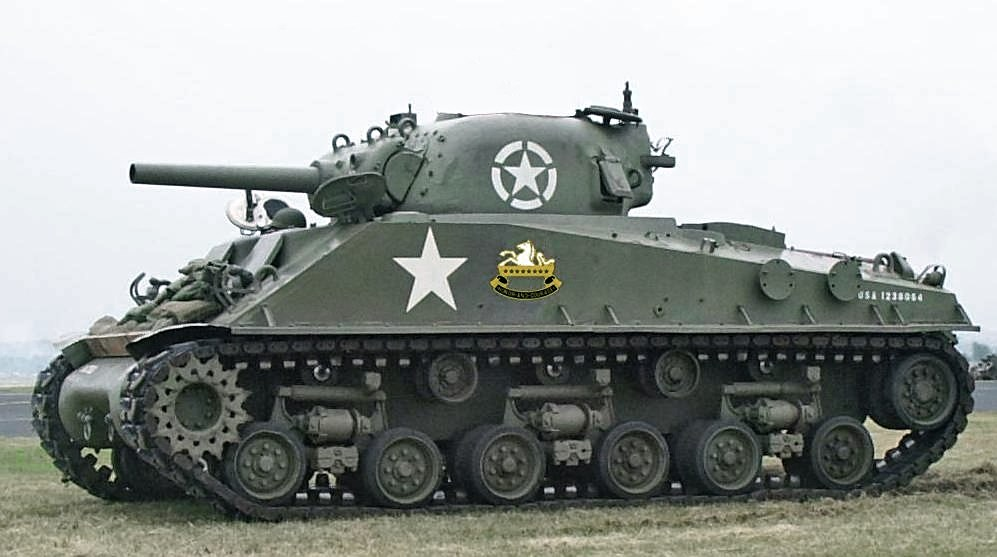
M4A3E8 105 Assault Gun

Companies A, B and C generally consisted of 17 medium tanks as follows:

- 3 platoons of 5 M4A3 Sherman tanks
- 1 M4A3 105 tank
- 1 M4A3 tank for the company commander.

Company D consisted of 17 light tanks:

- 3 platoons of 5 M5A1 Stuart tanks
- 1 section of 2 M5A1 Stuart tanks

Shortly after arriving in Europe, the 8th swapped its M5A1 tanks for the newer, more powerful M24 Chaffee light tank.

The M4A3 76 were M4A3 Shermans tanks fitted with a more powerful 76 mm cannon. Later in the war, more M4A3 76 tanks were added to the tank companies as replacements for older or damaged units. The 8th, along with many of the other armored units arriving in Europe in late 1944, was equipped with all 76 mm armed Shermans. The M4A3E8 76 or 'Easy Eight' version of the Sherman was also used by the 8th as it became available. In April 1945 the 8th began receiving the new M26 Pershing. None of the 8th Armored Pershing tanks engaged in combat before the close of hostilities.

== Armored infantry ==
Early experience with armored warfare in the First World War made it clear that tanks could not fight in isolation. It was essential that tanks be supported by infantry. The Armored Infantry was developed to fill that role.

The 8th was composed of 3 armored infantry battalions:

- 7th, 49th & 58th Armored Infantry Battalions

Each battalion was organized as follows:

- A battalion headquarters Unit
- 1 Headquarters Co (HQ Co)
- 3 armored infantry companies referred to as A, B and C Companies
- 1 Service Company

The battalion headquarters unit was made up of the battalion command team and their vehicles; 2 – 3 M2A1 or M3A1 Half-tracks and various jeeps or similar vehicles.

=== Headquarters Company (HQ Co) ===
M4 mortar carrier

The HQ Co was usually made up of:

- An HQ platoon comprising the battalion staff and their vehicles; 2 – 3 M3A1 Half-tracks and various jeeps or similar vehicles.
- A machine gun platoon with 6 M1917A1 Heavy Machine Guns, 3 M2 Heavy Machine guns, their crews (30 men total) and 3 M3A1 Half-tracks
- A mortar platoon with 3 M4 mortar carriers (made up of an 81mm mortar mounted in a M2A1 half-track and designed to fire over the rear of the vehicle) and their crews (30 men total)
- An assault gun platoon of 3 M4A3 105 tanks
- A Recon Platoon of 6 jeeps

=== Rifle companies ===
The battalion was made of 3 armored infantry companies: A, B and C which in turn were made up of:

- A Headquarters Platoon comprising the platoon staff and their vehicles: 2 M3A1 Half-tracks.
- 3 Rifle platoons of 36 riflemen divided into 3 squads of 12, 2 M1919A4 medium Machine Guns and their crews, 1 60mm mortar and its crew and the platoon's vehicles: 5 M3A1 Half-tracks.

=== Service Company ===
The Service Company was made up of:

- A Headquarters Platoon comprising the platoon staff and their vehicles: 2 M3A1Halftracks.
- An Anti-tank platoon with 9 bazooka rocket launchers, their crews (30 men in total) and their vehicles: 3 M3A1Halftracks.
- Medical units
- Other support units

Early in the war, the anti-tank platoon would have included a 37 mm anti-tank cannon but by the time the 8th entered combat in late 1944 the 37 mm was deemed ineffective against German armor and was discarded from the TO & E.

The primary weapon of the armored infantryman was the M1 Garand rifle. Crew-served weapon crewmen were usually armed with the M1911A1 pistol or the M1 Carbine as a personal weapon. The armored infantrymen were not issued the Browning Automatic Rifle as each rifle platoon contained 2 M1919A4 medium machine guns as well as the 4 M1919A4's and 1 M2 mounted on the platoon's halftracks. These machine guns could be dismounted and used as needed.

== Armored field artillery ==
The third side of the armored division's offensive triangle was the armored field artillery. The 8th Armored Division included the:

- 398th, 399th & 405th Armored Field Artillery Battalions

Each battalion comprised 18 self-propelled cannon and supporting vehicles. The battalion was broken down into 5 batteries and usually organized as:

- 1 Headquarters Battery
- 3 firing batteries referred to as A, B and C Batteries
- 1 Service Battery

=== Headquarters Battery (HQ Bat) ===
The HQ Bat was usually made up of:

- 1 Command Section of 3 M3A1Halftracks and 1 ¼ Ton Truck
- 2 observation sections of 1 M3A1Halftrack, 1 ¼ Ton truck and 1 Stinson L-5

Observation Airplane each.

- 3 M4A3 76 F.O. Forward Observer tanks, referenced as FO1, FO2 and FO3. These reported to the three armored artillery battalions, respectively. When not needed as direct observers, they were employed in their secondary roles as fighting tanks. Their crews reflected their FO role by the addition of an officer/observer who took command when not in an active tank combat situation.

=== Firing battery ===
Batteries A, B and C consisted of 6 self-propelled guns and supporting vehicles broken out as follows:

- 2 sections of 3 M7 105 mm self-propelled guns and 3 M3A1Halftracks and 1 ¼ Ton Truck
- 1 Headquarters Section with 1 M3A1Halftrack and 1 ¼ Ton Truck

=== Support Battery ===
The Support Battery comprised:

- 1 Service Section with 1 2½ Ton Truck and 1 ¼ Ton Truck
- 1 Medical Section

== Reconnaissance ==
Reconnaissance in the armored divisions was performed by the Armored Reconnaissance Battalion in the old style heavy division or by the Cavalry Reconnaissance Squadron, Mechanized in the light divisions such as the 8th.

These units were identical, except that the battalion was organized as companies, while the squadron as troops (although the light tank unit was a company in either organization).

- The 88th Armored Cavalry Recon Squadron served with the 8th Armored Division.

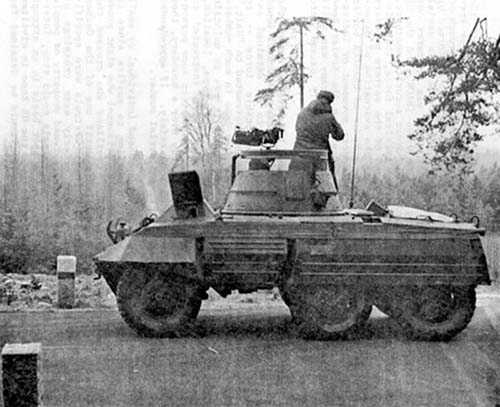
An armored cavalry unit on reconnaissance

The squadron was organized in troops and equipped as follows:

=== HQ Troop ===
- 10 Jeeps
- 4 M8 Armored Cars

=== Troops A, B, C & D ===
- 12 M8 Armored Cars
- 23 Jeeps

=== Troop E ===
- 8 M8 HMC assault guns

=== Company F ===
- 17 M5A1 tanks (Later M24 Chaffee)

Recon units were often supported by tank destroyer units, in the case of the 8th the 809th Tank Destroyer Battalion. The 809th used the M18 Hellcat 76 mm GMC.
