= Ellingsen =

Ellingsen is a surname. Notable people with the surname include:

- Åge Ellingsen (born 1962), former Norwegian ice hockey defenceman
- Audun Ellingsen (born 1979), Norwegian jazz musician (Upright bass)
- Beate Ellingsen (born 1950), Norwegian interior designer and furniture designer
- Bruce Ellingsen (born 1949), American former professional baseball player
- Eivind Ellingsen, Norwegian handball player
- Emma Ellingsen (born 2001), Norwegian model and internet personality
- Gisle Ellingsen (born 1965), former Norwegian high jumper
- Håkon Ellingsen (1894–1971), Norwegian rower who competed in the 1920 Summer Olympics
- Helge Ellingsen Waagaard (1781–1817), Norwegian farmer and non-commissioned military officer
- Jan Arild Ellingsen (born 1958), Norwegian politician for the Progress Party
- Lena Kristin Ellingsen (born 1980), actress from Saltdal, Norway
- María Ellingsen (born 1964), Icelandic actress starring in movies
- Øyvind Ellingsen (born 1975), Norwegian Professor of Cellular Cardiology
- Percy Ellingsen (1895–1947), Australian rules footballer
- Svein Ellingsen (1929–2020), Norwegian visual artist and hymnist
- Tore Ellingsen (born 1962), Norwegian economist active in Sweden

== See also ==
- Elingen
- Elling
- Ellinge
- Ellingen
