= Waagaard =

Waagaard is a Norwegian surname. Notable people with the surname include:

- Helge Ellingsen Waagaard (1781–1817), Norwegian farmer and military officer
- Ivar Anton Waagaard (born 1955), Norwegian pianist
- Michele Waagaard (born 1980), Norwegian-born Thai model, singer and radio host
