= Isaac White =

Isaac White may refer to:

- Isaac White (militia colonel), colonel in the Illinois militia
- Isaac D. White, U.S. Army general
- Isaac White (basketball), Australian basketball player
