= 809th Tank Destroyer Battalion =

- Active: 1942–1945
- Disbanded: 1945
- Country: United States
- Allegiance: Army
- Part of: Independent unit
- Equipment: M18 Hellcat; M36 tank destroyer

The 809th Tank Destroyer Battalion was a tank destroyer battalion of the United States Army active during the Second World War.

The battalion was activated on 18 March 1942, and remained in the United States until November 1944, when it was moved to the United Kingdom. It arrived in France on 20 January 1945, equipped with M18 Hellcat tank destroyers. It was attached to the 8th Armored Division on 9 February, and fought in the crossing of the Roer.

On 20 March, it was attached to the 79th Infantry Division, crossing the Rhine on the 27th, and was then attached to the 95th Infantry Division for the fighting around the Ruhr Pocket in April before being returned to the 8th Armoured on 13 April. During this month, it converted to M36 tank destroyers. In late April it saw action in the Harz Mountains, finishing the war in central Germany.

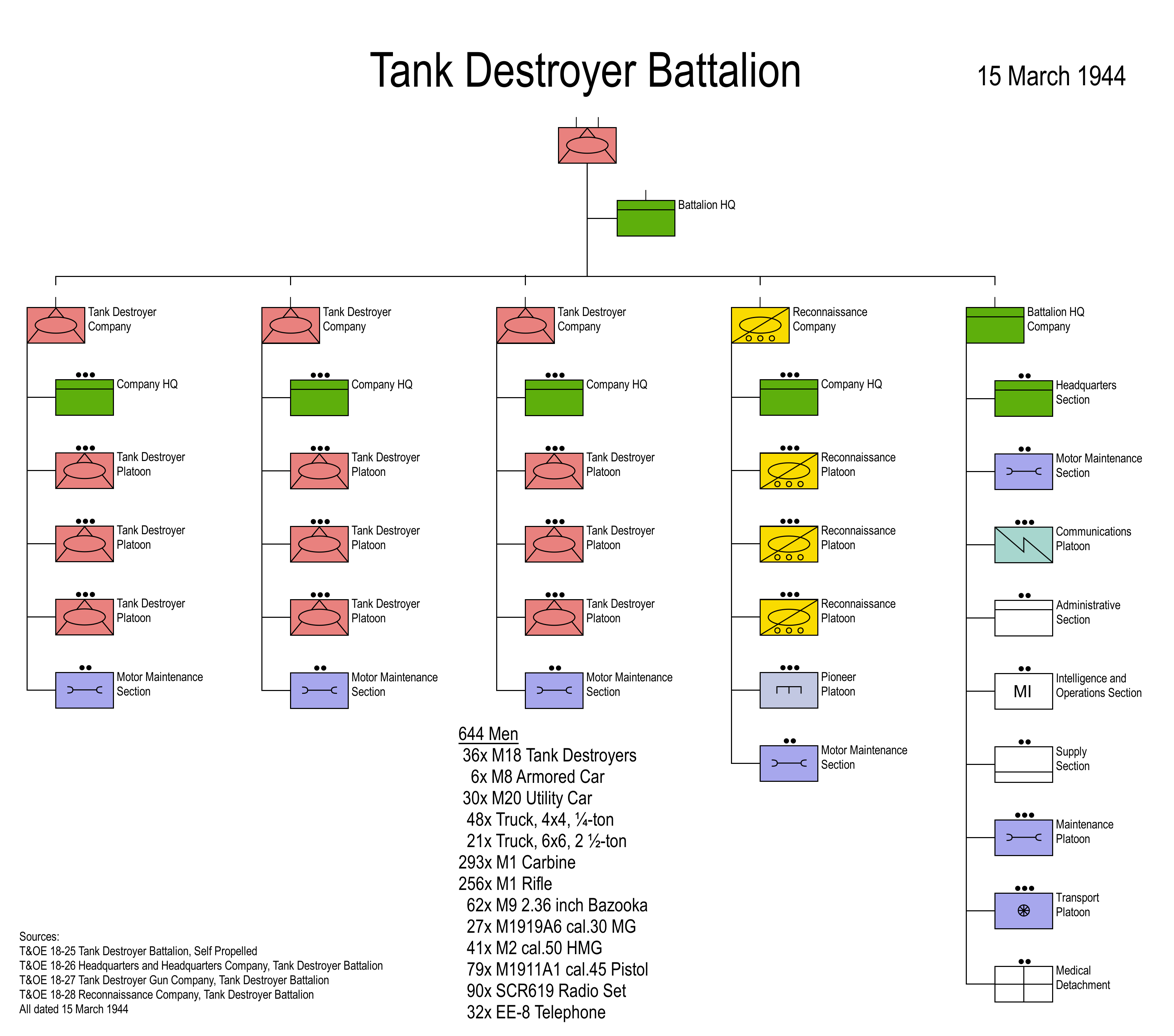
Tank Destroyer Battalion (SP) Structure – March 1944
