= John Howell Collier =

United States Army general (1899–1980)

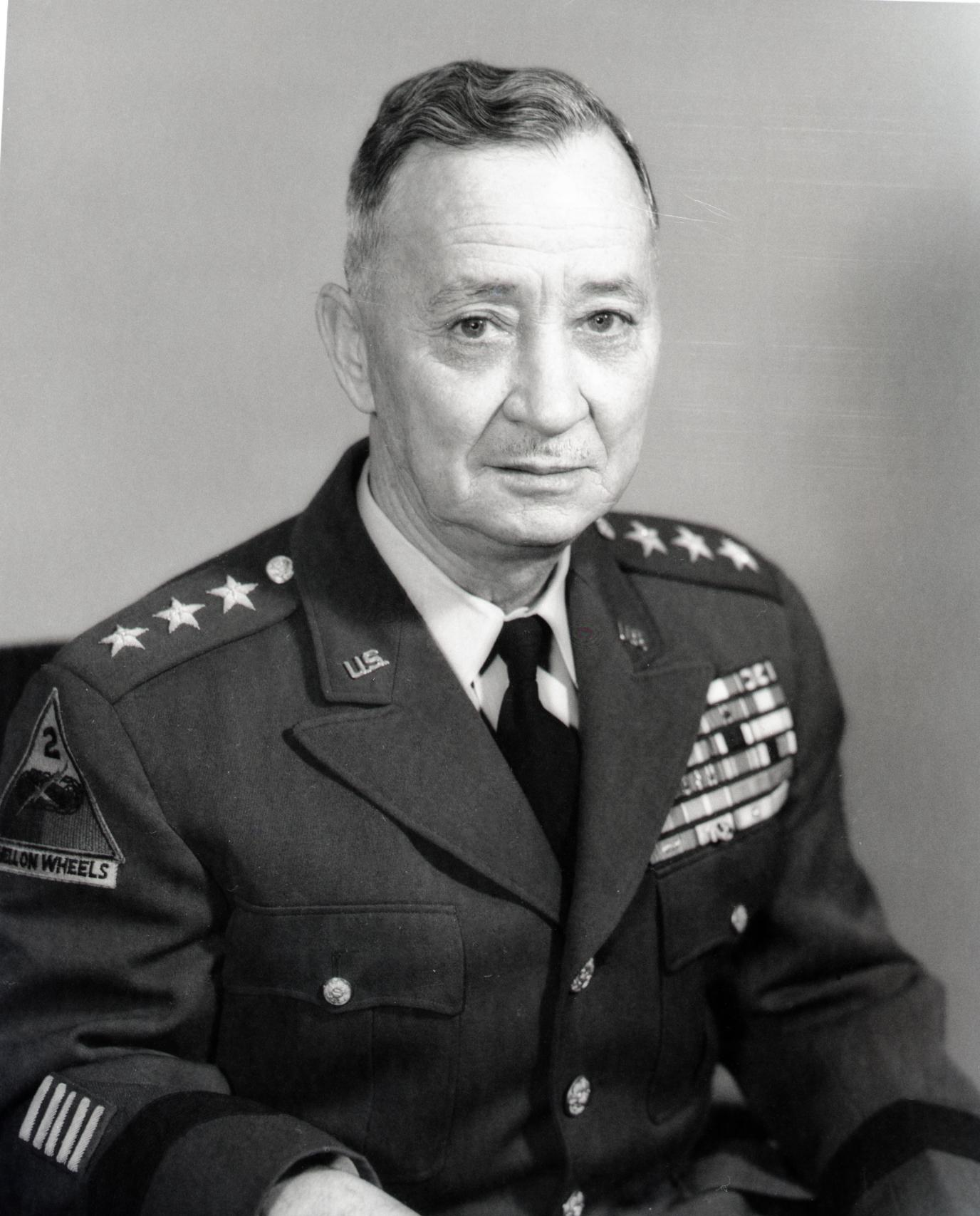
- Collier as a lieutenant general
- Born: September 8, 1898; Uvalde, Texas, US
- Died: April 21, 1980 (aged 81) San Antonio, Texas, US
- Buried: Fort Sam Houston National Cemetery
- Allegiance: United States
- Branch: United States Army
- Service years: 1914–1958
- Rank: Lieutenant General
- Commands: 3rd Battalion 66th Armored Regiment; Combat Command A, 2nd Armored Division; 2nd Armored Division; U.S. Army Armor Center and School; I Corps; Fourth United States Army
- Conflicts: Villa Expedition; World War I World War II; Korean War
- Awards: Distinguished Service Medal; Silver Star; Legion of Merit; Bronze Star

John Howell Collier (September 8, 1898 – April 21, 1980) was a lieutenant general in the United States Army. He was notable as a commander of 2nd Armored Division units in World War II and as the Army's Chief of Armor.

== Early life ==
Nicknamed "Pee Wee" because of his diminutive 5 ft 2 in (1.57 m) stature, Collier was born in Uvalde, Texas on September 8, 1898. He joined the Texas National Guard and served in the Villa Expedition.

== Subsequent military career ==
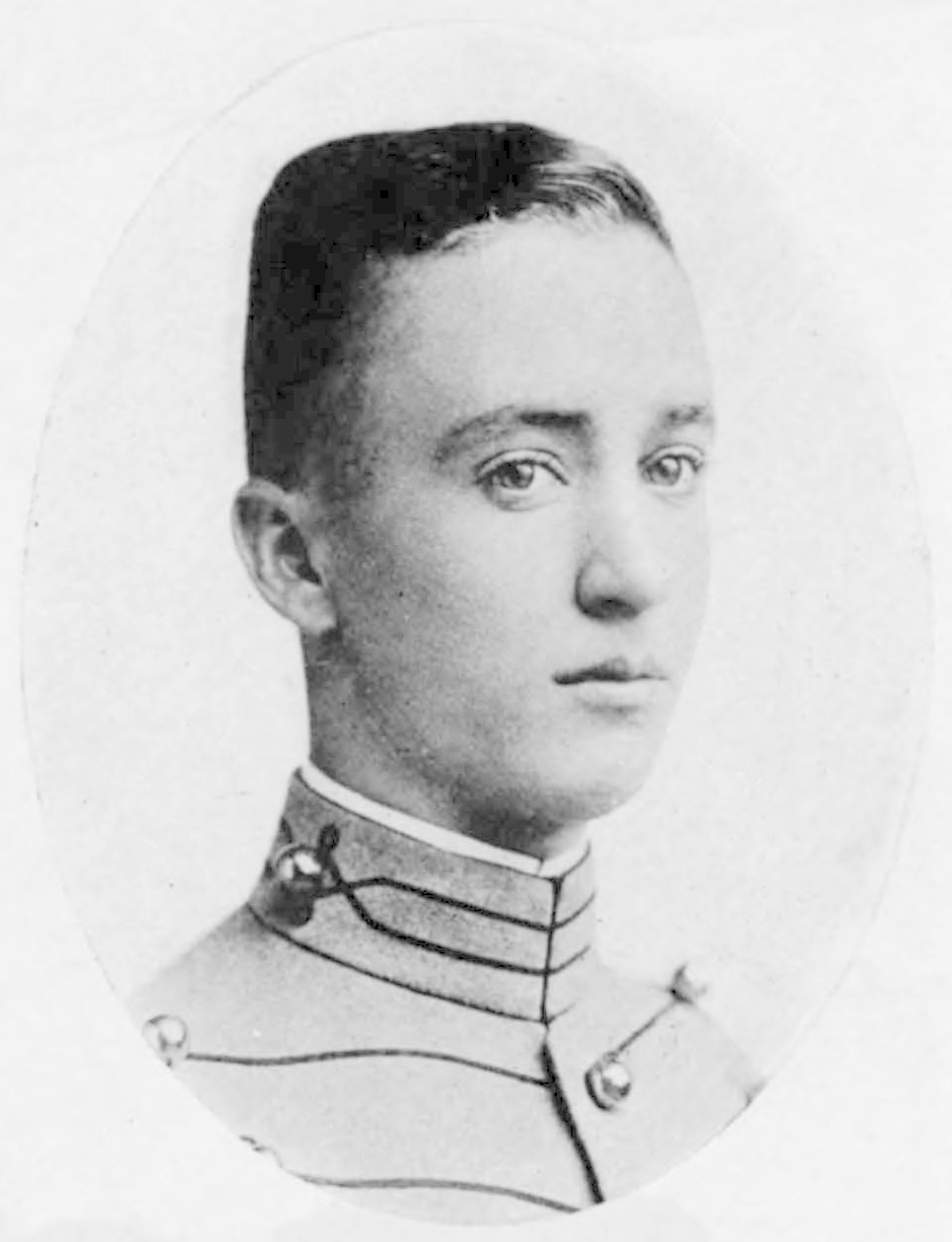
As a West Point cadet

Collier attended the United States Military Academy, from which he graduated in 1918. After receiving his commission, Collier was assigned to Europe to carry out an observation tour of World War I battlefields.

Assigned to the Cavalry branch, Collier completed the Cavalry Officer Basic Course in 1920.

Collier served in assignments throughout the United States, including instructor at New Mexico Military Institute and postings to Ft. Riley, Kansas, Ft. Benning, Georgia, and the Philippines.

Collier graduated from the Cavalry Regular Course in 1937, as well as the Advanced Equitation Course in 1938.

== World War II ==
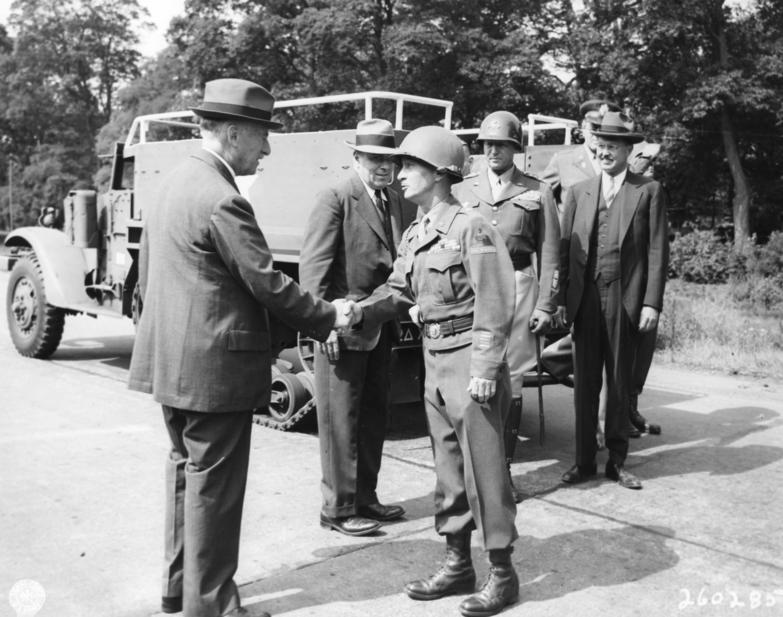
General Collier (right) shakes hands with Secretary of War Henry L. Stimson (left) during World War II in Europe at the Potsdam Conference in 1945.

After graduating from the Command and General Staff College in 1941, Collier was assigned to the 2nd Armored Division for World War II. He served in Africa and Europe as commander of the division's 3rd Battalion 66th Armored Regiment, and succeeded to command of Combat Command A when Maurice Rose was assigned to command the 3rd Armored Division. He then commanded the 2nd Armored Division from June to September, 1945.

== Post World War II ==
Collier continued his service after World War II, including high-profile assignments as the Army's Inspector of Armor, and commander of the U.S. Army Armor Center and School.

== Korean War ==
After serving as the Chief of Armor, Collier assumed command of I Corps in Korea on July 13, 1954. In November he was assigned additional duty as interim deputy commander of the Eighth United States Army until the arrival of the permanent deputy commander, Lt. Gen. Claude B. Ferenbaugh, in early January 1955. Ferenbaugh retired at the end of June and Collier relinquished command of I Corps to become deputy commander of Eighth Army and U.S. Army Forces Far East. He promptly made nationwide headlines when he attempted to prevent U.S. service members from fraternizing with South Korean women, an effort that proved unsuccessful when commanders in areas outside Eighth Army control did not follow Collier's example.

== Post Korean War ==
Collier returned to the United States in 1955 to assume command of the Fourth United States Army, where he served until his 1958 retirement.

== Awards and decorations ==
General Collier's decorations included multiple awards of the Distinguished Service Medal, two awards of the Silver Star, and multiple awards of the Legion of Merit and Bronze Star. At the end of World War II, the Union of Soviet Socialist Republics decorated him with the Order of Alexander Nevsky as the 2nd Armored Division linked up with elements of the Red Army.

== Retirement and death ==
After his 1958 retirement, Collier resided in San Antonio, Texas, where he died on April 21, 1980. Collier was buried at Fort Sam Houston National Cemetery, Section M Site 105-C.

Military offices
| Preceded by Isaac D. White | Commanding General 2nd Armored Division; June–September 1945 | Succeeded by John M. Devine |
