= Isaac D. White =

United States Army general (1901–1990)

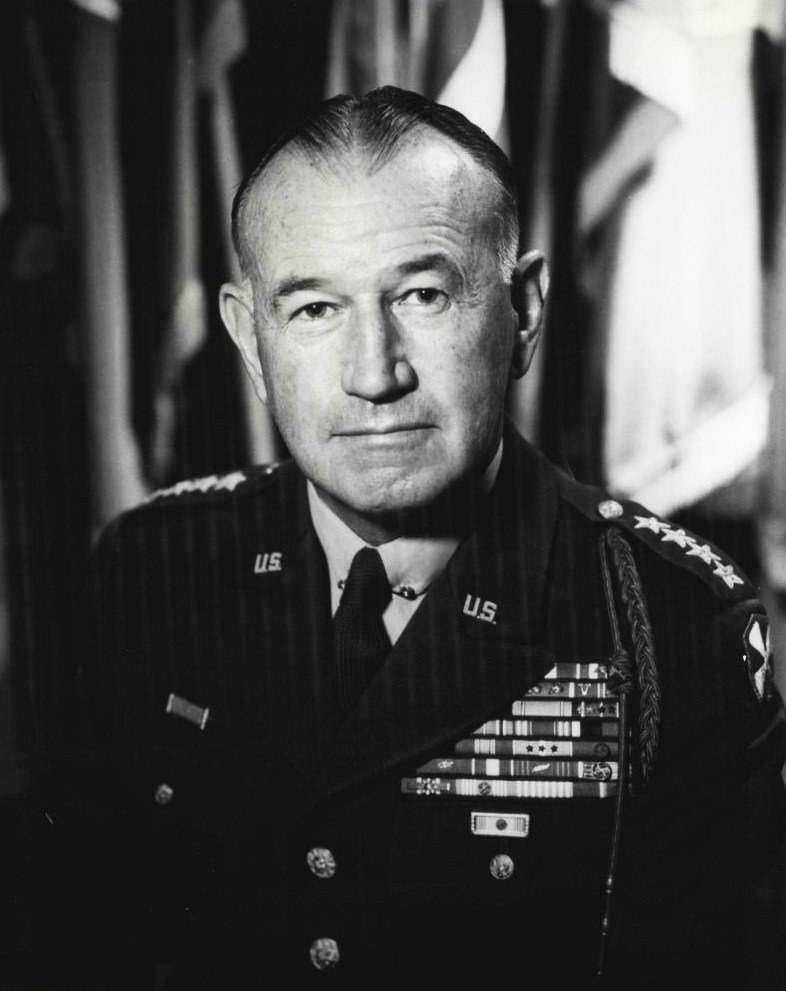
- Portrait of Isaac D. White
- Born: 6 March 1901; Peterborough, New Hampshire, U.S.
- Died: 11 June 1990 (aged 89); Hanover, New Hampshire, U.S.
- Burial place: Pine Hill Cemetery, Peterborough, New Hampshire
- Military career
- Allegiance: United States
- Branch: United States Army
- Service years: 1923–1961
- Rank: General
- Nickname: "Mr. Armor"
- Units: Cavalry Branch; Armor Branch
- Commands: U.S. Army, Pacific; Eighth United States Army; Fourth United States Army; X Corps; U.S. Constabulary; 2nd Armored Division
- Conflicts: World War II; Korean War
- Awards: Army Distinguished Service Medal (3); Silver Star (2); Legion of Merit (3); Bronze Star Medal
- Other work: Author

Isaac Davis White (6 March 1901 – 11 June 1990) was a senior officer in the United States Army who commanded the U.S. Army, Pacific (USARPAC) from July 1957 to March 1961. He was commissioned in the cavalry in 1923 and went on to serve in World War II and the Korean War. Because of his extensive experience in tank warfare, at his retirement Armor magazine dubbed him "Mr. Armor".

== Education ==
White graduated with a Bachelor of Science degree from Norwich University in 1922. His professional military education included the Cavalry School Troop Officer's Course (1928), United States Army Command and General Staff College (1939), and National War College (1948).

In 1951, White received the honorary degree of Master of Military Science from Norwich University. In 1957, Norwich awarded White an honorary LL.D. In 1958, the University of Maryland, College Park awarded him an honorary Doctor of Military Science.

== Military career ==
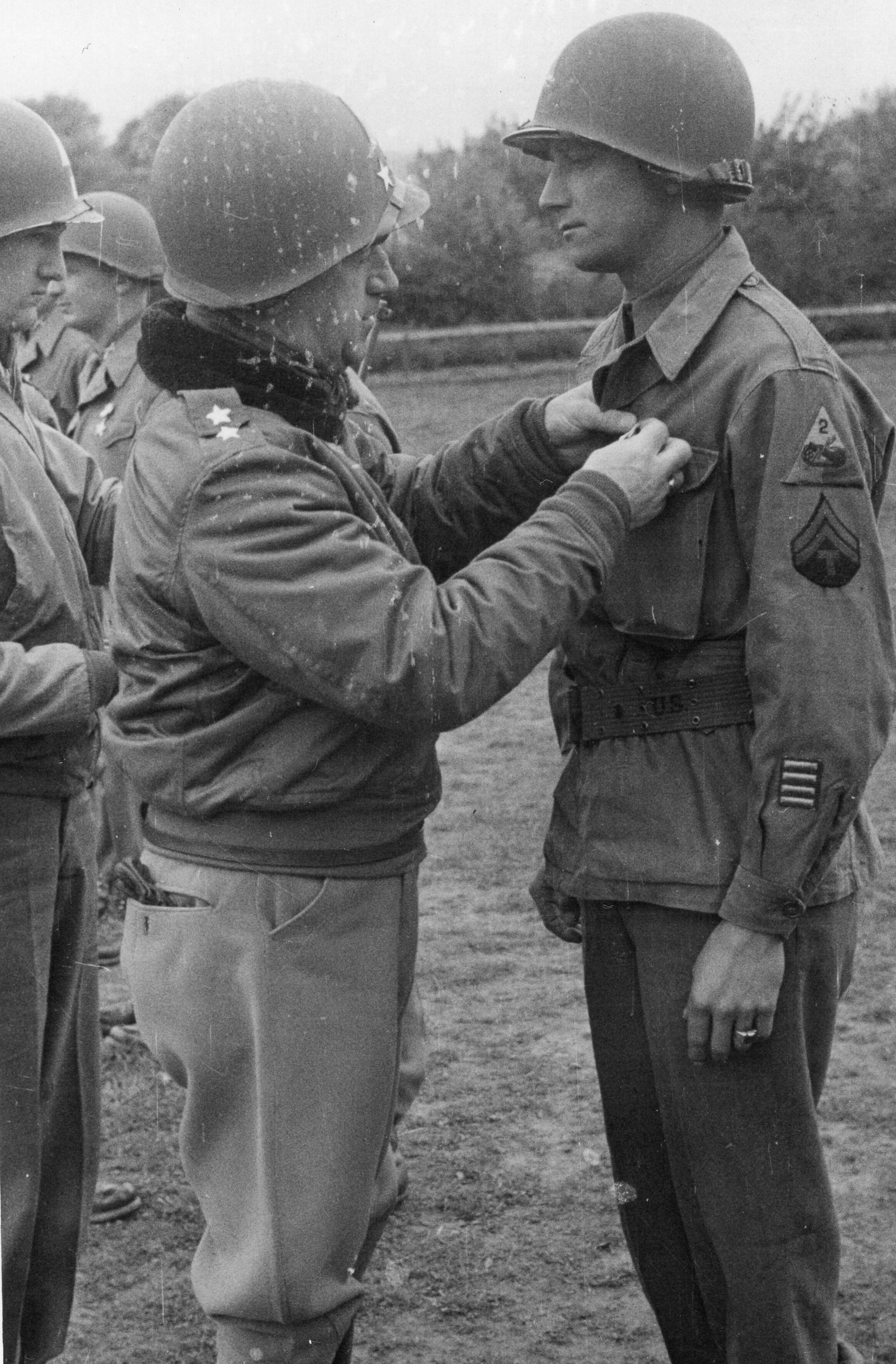
Major General Isaac D. White, commanding the 2nd Armored Division, presents T 5 Ivan L. Aleshire, from Montrose, Illinois, with the Silver Star, 4 May 1945.

Most of White's career was spent as a troop commander. His major commands include Commanding General of the 2nd Armored Division in Europe, 1945, and Commanding General of the United States Constabulary for the European Command. In the latter stages of the Korean War, he served as Commanding General of X Corps, followed by Commanding General of the Fourth Army in Fort Sam Houston, Texas. Prior to becoming Commanding General for the US Army, Pacific, White served as Commanding General for the Eighth Army in Korea.

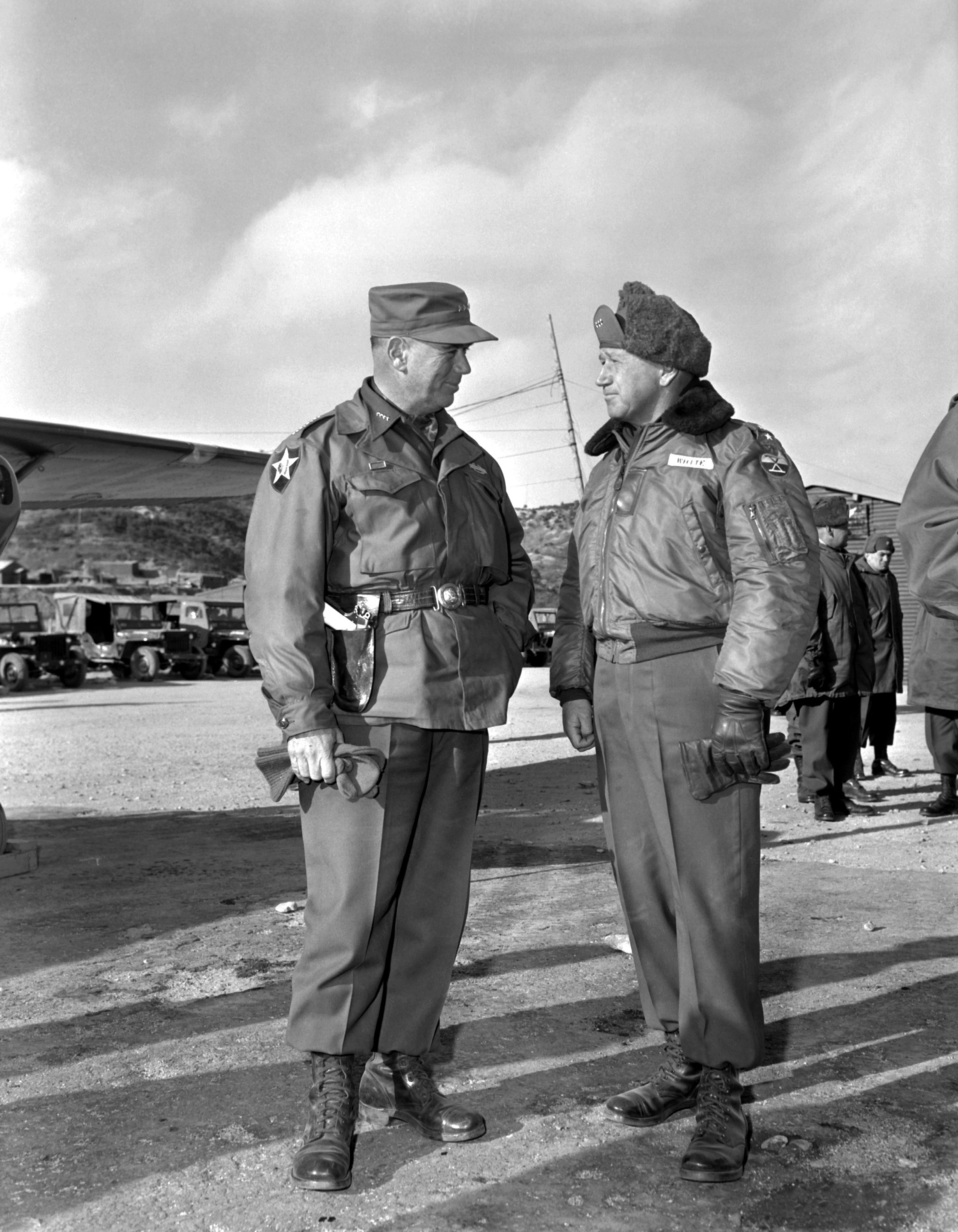
General James Van Fleet (left) talks to Lieutenant General Isaac D. White at the airstrip, during his visit north of Korea

Additional assignments include Commandant of the Cavalry School and Commandant for the Ground General School in Fort Riley, Kansas. He later served as Deputy Commanding General for the Seventh Army and Chief of Staff for First Army Headquarters, Governors Island, New York. He also served as Commandant of the Armored School. After retirement, White received recognition as a visionary, strategic military thinker with the publication of his book, Alternative to Armageddon—the Peace Potential of Lightning War. Published in 1970, he advocated a quick strike capability for US forces as an alternative to a nuclear exchange or a war of attrition, as the nation was experiencing in Vietnam at the time.

== Awards and decorations ==
White's awards include the Army Distinguished Service Medal with two oak leaf clusters, the Silver Star with oak leaf cluster, the Legion of Merit with two oak leaf clusters, the Bronze Star Medal, the World War II Victory Medal, the Korean Service Medal with three Bronze Service Stars, and multiple decorations from other nations including the Order of the Red Banner from the Union of Soviet Socialist Republics and awards from Korea, France, Belgium, Philippines, Mexico, and Japan.

U.S. Route 202, from White's birthplace of Peterborough, New Hampshire, through Jaffrey to the Massachusetts border in Rindge, has been designated the "General I.D. White Highway" in his honor.

Military offices
Preceded by Ernest N. Harmon	Commanding General 2nd Armored Division; January–June 1945	Succeeded by John H. Collier
