= John M. Devine =

United States Army general (1895–1971)

John Matthew Devine
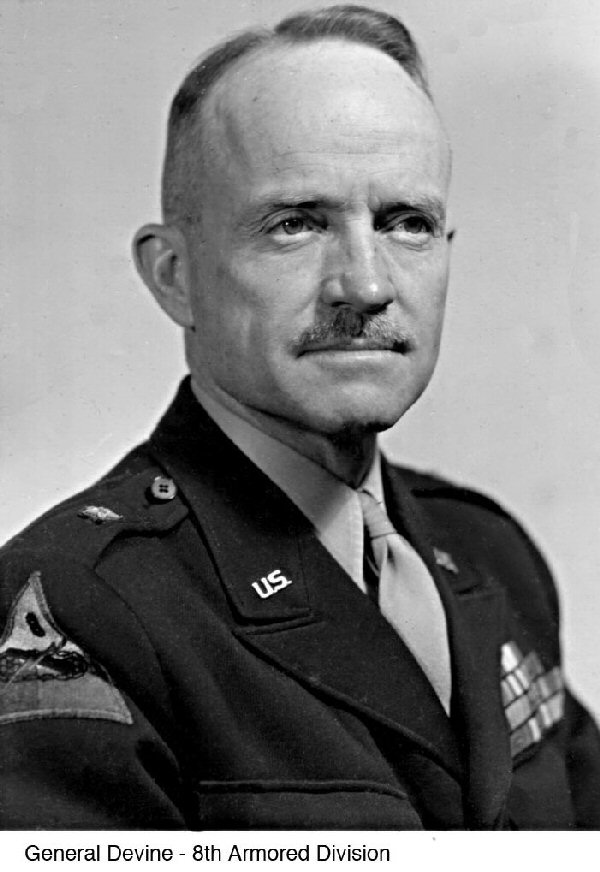
- Born: June 18, 1895; Providence, Rhode Island, US
- Died: March 8, 1971 (aged 75); Leesburg, Virginia, US
- Military career
- Allegiance: United States
- Branch: United States Army
- Service years: 1917–1952
- Rank: Major general
- Service number: 0-5232
- Unit: Field Artillery Branch
- Commands: 9th Infantry Division; 1st Cavalry Division; 2nd Armored Division; 8th Armored Division
- Conflicts: World War I; World War II; Battle of Normandy; Falaise Pocket; Battle of the Bulge; Rhineland Campaign; Ruhr Pocket; Central European Campaign
- Awards: Distinguished Service Medal; Silver Star; Legion of Merit; Bronze Star Medal (2)

John Matthew Devine (June 18, 1895 – March 8, 1971) was a highly decorated officer in the United States Army with the rank of major general. He is a graduate of the United States Military Academy, and is most noted as Commanding general, 8th Armored Division in the European Theater of Operations during World War II.

Following the War, Devine held several divisional commands, including 2nd Armored Division, 1st Cavalry Division and 9th Infantry Division and completed his service in 1952.

== Early career ==
John M. Devine was born on June 18, 1895, in Providence, Rhode Island, as the son of Patrick and Bridget Devine. He graduated from the La Salle Academy in Providence in May 1912 and received an appointment to the United States Military Academy (USMA) at West Point, New York, in June 1913. While at the academy, he was a member of the Class 1917, which produced more than 55 future general officers, including two Army Chiefs of Staff – Joseph L. Collins and Matthew B. Ridgway.

Devine graduated, 17th in a class of 139, with Bachelor of Science degree on April 20, 1917, shortly following the United States entry into World War I, and was commissioned second lieutenant in the Field Artillery Branch. Due to need of officers during the mobilization, he was promoted to first lieutenant on May 15, 1917, and to temporary rank of captain on August 5, that year. Devine was attached to the 3rd Field Artillery Regiment at Fort Sam Houston, Texas and following the intensive training and preparations for combat deployment at Leon Springs, Texas, he was ordered to the Army Field Artillery School at Fort Sill, Oklahoma in February 1918, where he completed one-month course.

He was subsequently ordered to Camp Doniphan, Oklahoma, where he was stationed until July 1918, when he embarked for Europe to reinforce American Expeditionary Force. Following his arrival to France, Devine was attached as an Instructor to the Army Field Artillery Center at Valdahon. He was later transferred to the Fourteen Training Area at Villouxel, Dijon and was promoted to the temporary rank of major.

== Interwar period ==
Devine returned to the United States in June 1919 and reverted to the peacetime rank of captain on June 30, 1919. He then rejoined his 3rd Field Artillery Regiment at Camp Grant, Illinois and served with that outfit until August 1921, when he was ordered to the Yale University. Devine graduated with Master of Science degree in communications engineering in June 1922.

Upon the graduation from Yale, Devine was ordered to the Army Field Artillery School at Fort Sill, Oklahoma, where he served as an instructor of tactics until July 1923, when he was transferred to the West Point Military Academy for same assignment. After five years of teaching, Devine returned to the Army Field Artillery School as student and entered the Advanced course.

He completed the course in July 1929 and remained there as an instructor in gunnery until June 1932, when he was promoted to major and ordered back to West Point for duty as an assistant professor of English. Devine was sent to the Presidio of San Francisco in August 1936 and assumed duty as Executive officer of the 2nd Battalion, 76th Field Artillery Regiment.

In June 1937, Devine was ordered to the Army Command and General Staff School and upon the graduation in following June, he assumed duty as an assistant professor of Military Science and Tactics at Yale University. During the end of his tenure, he was promoted to lieutenant colonel on May 16, 1940.

== World War II ==
Devine was transferred to the newly created Armor Branch in July 1940 and assumed duty as Assistant Chief of Staff for Operations (G-3), 1st Armored Division under Major general Bruce Magruder. He was one of the first officers in the Armor branch and participated in the initial training of the division and development of the branch. Devine was transferred to the headquarters, I Armored Corps under Major General Charles L. Scott.

Following the Japanese attack on Pearl Harbor and United States entry into World War II, Devine was promoted to the temporary rank of colonel on December 11, 1941, and appointed Chief of Staff, I Armored Corps under Major general George S. Patton.

On May 24, 1942, Devine was promoted to the temporary rank of brigadier general and attached to the 6th Armored Division under Major general Carlos Brewer at Fort Knox, Kentucky as commanding officer, Combat Command A, a combined brigade size unit of tanks, armored infantry, armored field artillery battalions and engineer units.

Devine was attached to the 90th Infantry Division under Major general Henry Terrell Jr. and embarked to the European Theater of Operations in April 1944. After two months of training in England, 90th Division landed on Utah Beach on D-Day, June 6, 1944, and participated in the combats in Normandy, France and in the closing of the Falaise Pocket. He was decorated with Bronze Star Medal for his service in Normandy.

On September 8, 1944, Devine distinguished himself during the combats near the city of Verdun. When a large force of enemy tanks, armored vehicles and infantry, penetrated the front, the breakthrough extended to the Divisional command post, a fire fight commenced immediately. The enemy fire became exceptionally heavy resulting in a number of casualties. Devine personally directed the defenses, moving about under small arms and tank fire in the moonlight. His efforts helped drove out the Germans and he was decorated with Silver Star for bravery. The citation for the medal reads:

The President of the United States of America, authorized by Act of Congress July 9, 1918, takes pleasure in presenting the Silver Star to Brigadier General John Matthew Devine (ASN: 0-5232), United States Army, for gallantry in action against the enemy while serving as Commanding Officer, Division Artillery, 90th Infantry Division in Northern France. On 8 September 1944 near ****, France, when a large force of enemy tanks, armored vehicles and infantry, penetrated the front, the breakthrough extended to the Command Posts of ****, a fire fight commenced immediately. The enemy fire became exceptionally heavy resulting in a number of casualties. Brigadier General Devine personally directed the defenses, moving about under small arms and tank fire in the moonlight. His calmness under fire and gallantry in action were a reassuring influence to the personnel, the action of which was material to turning back the enemy force and was in keeping with the highest traditions of military service.

Devine was transferred to the struggling 7th Armored Division, where he succeeded Brigadier general John B. Thompson (who was relieved by General Patton) as Commanding general, Combat Command B. However his tenure was short, because he was personally selected by General Dwight D. Eisenhower as new commanding general, 8th Armored Division.

The 8th Armored Division was still in the United States, preparing for the combat deployment at Camp Polk, Louisiana, but divisional commander, Major general William M. Grimes, was declared unfit for combat duty and need to be relieved. Devine succeeded him on October 2, 1944, and began with the moving of the division to the Camp Kilmer, New York in preparation for shipment overseas.

After some additional training and acquisition of new equipment at Tidworth, England, the 8th Armored Division landed in France, January 5, 1945. Devine led his division during the last combats during the Battle of the Bulge and after brief rest and refit in the Netherlands, he participated in the combats near the town of Echt. The 8th Armored Division then participated in the combats in the Rhineland and in the Ruhr Pocket, advancing more eastward to the Germany. The 8th Armored liberated Halberstadt-Zwieberge, a subcamp of the Buchenwald concentration camp, between April 12 and 17, 1945 during its drive through central Germany.

Devine was promoted to the temporary rank of major general on May 2, 1945, and following the surrender of Nazi Germany few days later, he led his division to Pilsen, Czechoslovakia for occupation duty and guarding of German Prisoners-of-War. For his service with 8th Armored Division, Devine received Army Distinguished Service Medal, Legion of Merit and second Bronze Star Medal.

He was also decorated by the Allies and received Legion of Honour and Croix de Guerre with Palm from France, Order of Orange-Nassau from the Government of the Netherlands and Order of the White Lion and War Cross 1939-1945 from the Government of Czechoslovakia.

== Postwar service ==
Devine was ordered to the United States in September 1945 and assumed command of 2nd Armored Division located at Camp Hood, Texas. He was responsible for the demobilization of many units returning home from the European Theater of Operations. From July to October 1946, he also served as commander of III Corps.

Due to the postwar reduction of the Army, Devine was reverted to the peacetime rank of brigadier general and appointed commanding general of the Universal Military Training Experimental Unit (UMT) at Fort Knox, Kentucky. The UMT was the Universal Military Training Experimental Unit for the seventeen-to-nineteenth year old volunteers. He was succeeded by Brigadier general Josef R. Sheetz.

In January 1948, Devine was transferred to Fort Monroe, Virginia for duty as Assistant Chief of Staff (G-3), Army Field Forces under General Jacob L. Devers. He was responsible for planning of training of new recruits and also had the authority to revise training manuals and schedules. Devine was promoted again to Major general in May 1948 and appointed Deputy Chief of Staff, Army Field Forces.

Devine was ordered to Tokyo, Japan and assumed command of 1st Cavalry Division in February 1949. He participated in the occupation duty until August that year, when he was sent back to the United States and assumed command of 9th Infantry Division at Fort Carson, Colorado.

== Retirement and death ==
Devine retired from the Army in 1952 and settled in Leesburg, Virginia. He served as commandant of cadets at Virginia Tech until 1961 and also enjoyed golf in his free time. Devine died on March 8, 1971, aged 75, and was buried with full military honors at United States Military Academy Cemetery beside his wife Anna Whitelegg Devine. They had together four children.

The Virginia Tech Corps of Cadets Major General John M. Devine Scholarship at Virginia Tech is named in his honor for undergraduate students who are members in good standing of the Virginia Tech Corps of Cadets.

== Decorations ==
Awards and decorations:

1st Row	Army Distinguished Service Medal	Silver Star	Legion of Merit	Bronze Star Medal with Oak Leaf Cluster
2nd Row	World War I Victory Medal with one Battle Clasp	American Defense Service Medal	American Campaign Medal	European-African-Middle Eastern Campaign Medal with four 3/16 inch service stars and Arrowhead device
3rd Row	World War II Victory Medal	Army of Occupation Medal	National Defense Service Medal	Officer of the Legion of Honor (France)
4th Row	French Croix de guerre 1939-1945 with Palm	Dutch Order of Orange-Nassau, Officer	Czechoslovak Order of the White Lion, 3rd Class	Czechoslovak War Cross 1939–1945

== See also ==
- 8th Armored Division

Military offices
Preceded by A. Arnim White	Commanding General 9th Infantry Division; October 1949 – September 1950	Succeeded by William K. Harrison Jr.
Preceded by William C. Chase	Commanding General 1st Cavalry Division; February 1, 1949 – August 1, 1949	Succeeded by Thomas W. Herren
Preceded by John Howell Collier	Commanding General 2nd Armored Division; September 4, 1945 – March 24, 1946	Succeeded by John W. Leonard
Preceded by William M. Grimes	Commanding General 8th Armored Division; October 2, 1944 – August 7, 1945	Succeeded by Charles F. Colson
