= Emma Ellingsen =

Norwegian model and influencer (born 2001)

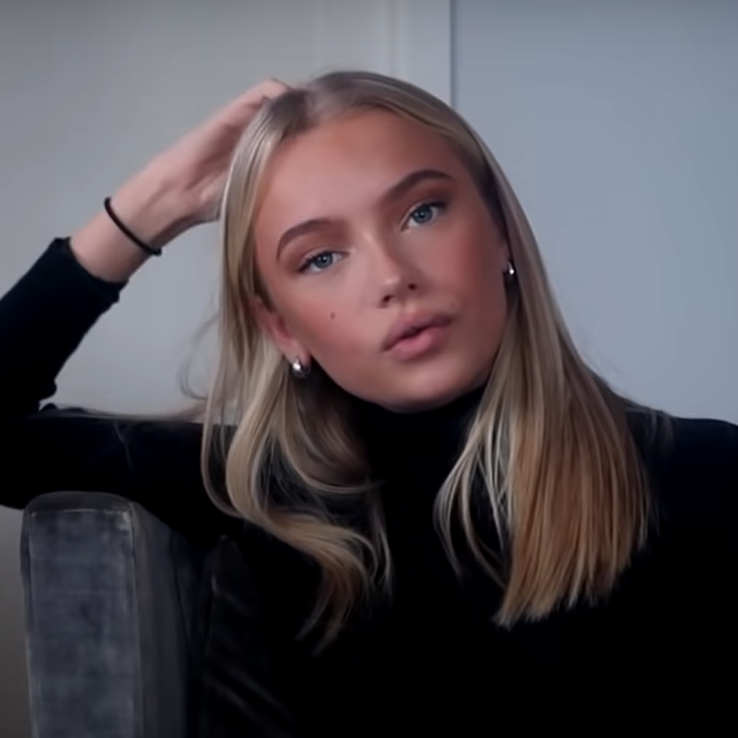
- Ellingsen in 2019
- Born: 9 September 2001 (age 25); Tønsberg, Norway
- Modeling information
- Height: 1.8 m (5 ft 11 in)
- Hair color: Blonde
- Eye color: Blue
- Agency: Team Models

YouTube information
- Channel: Emma Ellingsen
- Genres: Make-up; vlog; travel vlogs
- Subscribers: 455 thousand
- Views: 33.8 million
- Last updated: 12 November 2025

Emma Kongslie Ellingsen (born 9 September 2001) is a Norwegian model and YouTuber. Her YouTube channel features make up tutorials, video vlogs, and travel vlogs. Ellingsen is signed with the Oslo-based modeling agency Team Models.

== Early life ==
Ellingsen grew up on Nøtterøy, an island in the county of Vestfold south of Oslo. Ellingsen came out to her family and friends as transgender when she was around nine years old. As a child she was featured in the Norwegian documentary Born in the Wrong Body which focused on her and other transgender children in Norway.

== Career ==
By age 17, the young model had appeared on several cover stories for Norwegian fashion magazines and in international publications like W magazine. Ellingsen started publishing YouTube videos in English at age 15, resulting in her subscriber count increasing from 40,000 in September 2017 to around 300,000 a year later. Ellingsen is one of the most-followed people from Norway on social media. She has more than 600,000 followers on Instagram. She also has 1.7 million likes and more than 150,000 followers on TikTok.

In January 2018 Ellingsen was named 'influencer of the year' at the See and Hear Celebrity Gala. As a 17-year-old she was also nominated for the 2018 'name of the year' award given by Dagbladet newspaper, one of the largest newspapers in Norway.

In 2018, she took a year off from school to focus on her modeling and social media career.

Ellingsen was the central figure in ELLE Norway's June 2019 issue.

Once described as "Norway's rising Kendall Jenner", Ellingsen has stated that she admires Jenner's "laid-back" style, and that she gets "a lot of inspiration from her and whoever else I see on my Explore page on Instagram—when it's not all makeup and cute boys".

Ellingsen has worked for fashionable clothing seller NA-KD, modelling products and creating her own influencer collections. In June 2020, it was announced that Ellingsen would feature in the Norwegian TV Series The Bloggers.

She stars in the television series Generation Z, which came out 2018. In 2020, Ellingsen released a book, Emma.

== TV-appearances (selection) ==
- 2014: Født i feil kropp
- 2018–2019: Generasjon Z
- 2019: Glow Up
- 2020–2021: Bloggerne
- 2021: Emmas stemme
- 2022: Annerledes
- 2024: Farmen kjendis
- 2024: Sofa
- 2025: Boksen
- 2025: Skal vi danse
- 2026: Girls of Oslo
