= Bausenhagen =

Coordinates: 51°31′N 7°48′E

- Village
- Bausenhagen viewed from the west.
- Interactive map of Bausenhagen
- Country: Germany
- City: Fröndenberg
- Established: 993
- Elevation: 180 m (590 ft)

Population
  - Total: 600
- Bausenhagen viewed from the North (Haarstrang) towards the Sauerland.

Bausenhagen is a village and former municipality, since 1968 part of the city of Fröndenberg in North Rhine-Westphalia, Germany. It has about 600 inhabitants.

== Geography ==
Bausenhagen is situated on the southern part of the Haar, about 180m above sea level.

== History ==
Bausenhagen is one of the oldest settlements in the region: it celebrated 1000 years in 1993. It was a municipality until 1968, when it became part of Fröndenberg.

== Tourism ==
The present day Evangelic church goes back to the 12th century except for the tower which was destroyed several times and lastly reconstructed in 1884. Still, it is one of the major historical churches in the region. During restoration in 1956 a fresco of Jesus from the 12th century was re-discovered and thus is one of the oldest of its kind north of the Alpes. Apart from the historic site, the picturesque hilly landscape with woods, pastures and fields surrounding the village attracts both wanderers and cyclists.
