= United States Army Ground General School =

The United States Army Ground General School was a short-lived school located at Fort Riley, Kansas. It was organized in 1946 when the Army Cavalry School was closed. The mission of the Army General School was to conduct basic training for officers of all branches, to conduct officer candidate school for selected enlisted man, and to provide instruction for officers in the duties of intelligence officers. The Ground General trained many officers who served in the Korean War. It closed in 1955.
