= Elsen =

- Stadtteil of Paderborn
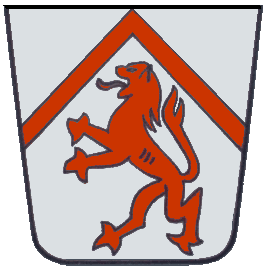
- Coat of arms
- Interactive map of Elsen
- Location within Germany Location within North Rhine-Westphalia
- Coordinates: 51°44′N 8°41′E
- Country: Germany
- State: North Rhine-Westphalia
- Admin. region: Detmold
- District: Paderborn
- City: Paderborn

Area
  - Total: 20.19 km^{2} (7.80 sq mi)
- Elevation: 112 m (367 ft)

Population (2021)
  - Total: 16,323
  - Density: 808.5/km^{2} (2,094/sq mi)
- Time zone: UTC+01:00 (CET)
  - Summer (DST): UTC+02:00 (CEST)
- Postal codes: 33106
- Dialling codes: 05254

Elsen is a village in Germany that forms a part of the city Paderborn in North Rhine-Westphalia. Until 1975 Elsen was an autonomous Gemeinde (municipality). As of 2021, Elsen has around 16,000 inhabitants.

== History ==
Based on discovery of early Germanic and Roman remains near the village, which date back to the third century B.C., it can be assumed that the area was populated by Germanic tribes during this time.

Only very few remains or artifacts exist that shed light on the early development of the village. However, a farm named Ilasan, a subsidiary location of the main farmstead Nigenhus (Neuhaus) is mentioned in a scripture dating back to 1036. In this writing the farm is given to a local clerical collegiate by the bishop of Paderborn. In a 15th-century copy of this document the village is already named "Elesen".

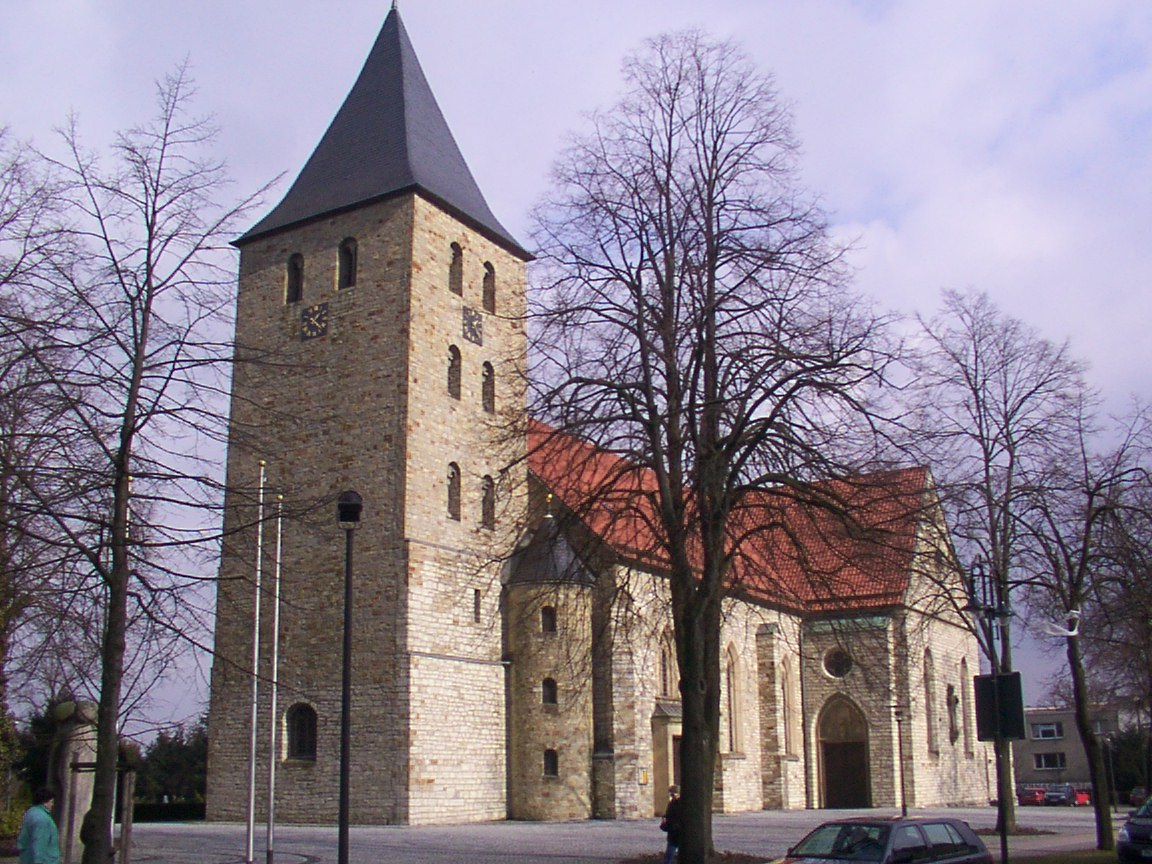
Catholic church St. Dionysius in the centre of Elsen

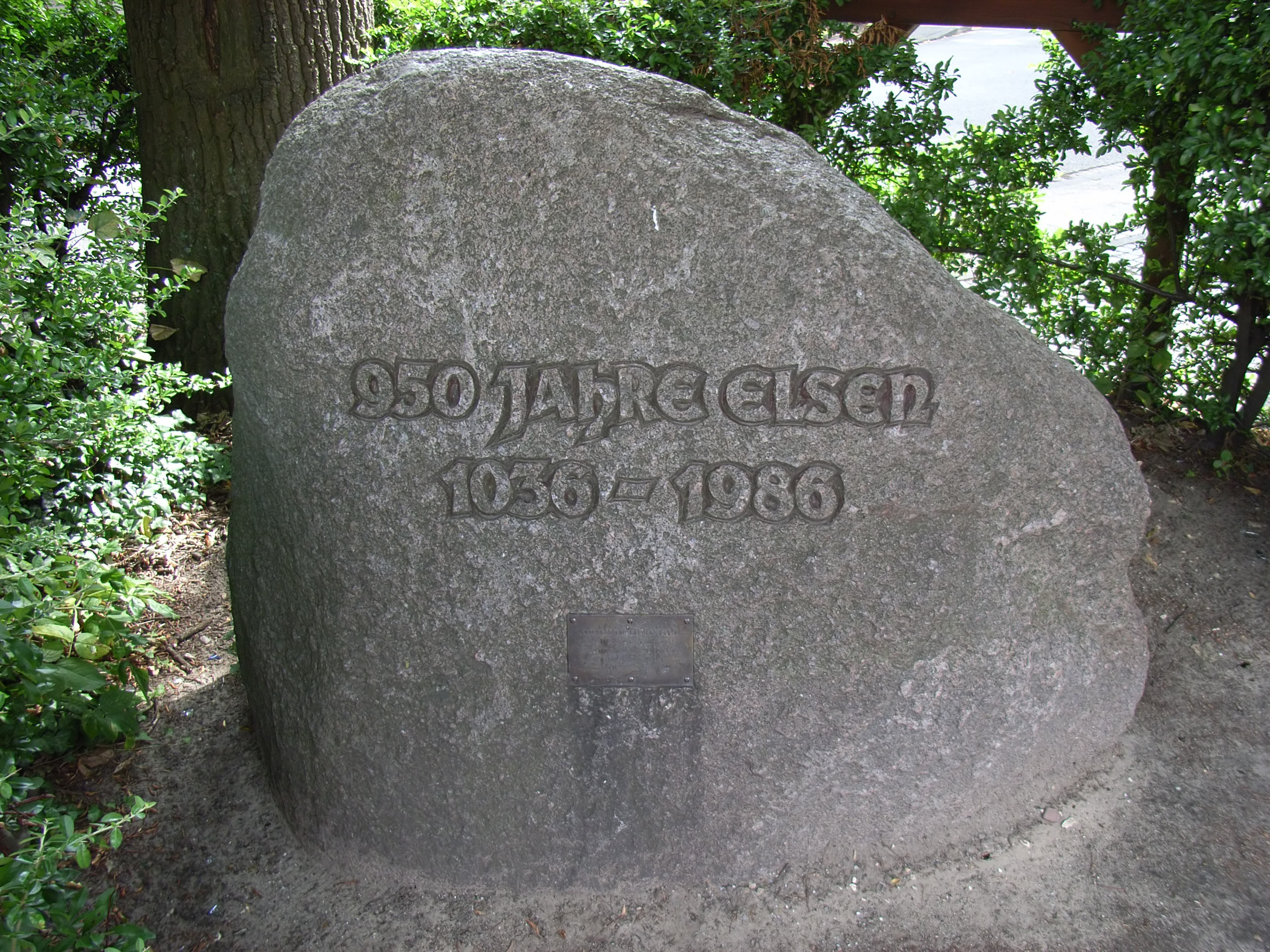
Monument for the 950th anniversary of Elsen village
