= Helge Ellingsen Waagaard =

Norwegian farmer and military officer (1781–1817)

- Born: 27 January 1781; Norderhov, Norway
- Died: 25 March 1817 (aged 36)
- Occupations: farmer and non-commissioned military officer

Helge Ellingsen Waagaard (27 January 1781 – 25 March 1817) was a Norwegian farmer and non-commissioned military officer. He served as a representative at the Norwegian Constitutional Assembly.

Helge Ellingsen Waagaard was born at Vågård farm at Lunder parish in Norderhov (now Ringerike) in Buskerud, Norway. Waagaard participated in the brief campaign in Østfold during the Swedish–Norwegian War. In 1812, he married Anne Eriksdatter Kihle (1786-1863) with whom he had four children. Waagaard died at Vågård during the spring of 1817 having never fully recovered from wounds he suffered during the campaign in 1814.

Helge Ellingsen Waagaard represented the enlisted infantry regiment, Det nordenfjeldske Infanteriregiment at the Norwegian Constituent Assembly in 1814. At the National Assembly, Waagaard generally supported the position of the independence party (Selvstendighetspartiet) together with fellow delegate Peter Blankenborg Prydz.

== Related Reading ==
- Holme Jørn (2014) De kom fra alle kanter - Eidsvollsmennene og deres hus (Oslo: Cappelen Damm) ISBN 978-82-02-44564-5
