= Camp Grohn =

U.S. Army base in Germany

Coordinates: 53°10′00″N 8°39′00″E

External image
- Camp Grohn
- Camp Grohn in the 1950s

Camp Grohn was a military base of the U.S. Army on the outskirts of Bremen, Germany, after the end of World War II from 1945 to 1954. Camp Grohn was originally built in 1936 as Flak Kaserne and housed the first battalion of the Luftwaffe's 26th Anti-Aircraft Artillery Regiment prior to the outbreak of World War II. Following the defeat of Germany in the war, the U.S. Army took over the military base and renamed it Camp Grohn after the part of Bremen in which the camp was located. Camp Grohn was in a small, joint American/British sector in northern Germany called the Bremen Enclave, which included the ports of Bremen and Bremerhaven.

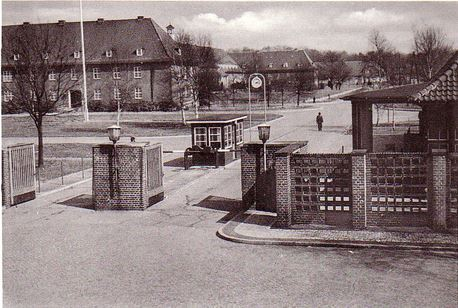
Camp Grohn, Germany

As part of the U.S. postwar occupation of Germany, various U.S. Army units were housed at Camp Grohn, including the headquarters of the 29th Infantry Division (from May 1945 until January 1946), elements of the 29th Infantry Regiment, the 307th Replacement Group (from 1952 until 1955), the 78th Infantry Division's 311th Infantry Regiment (from November 1945 until May 1946), and elements of the 1st Infantry Division's 18th Infantry Regiment (from October 1946 until July 1948). The 12 streets in the camp were named after heroes of the 311th Regiment (S/Sgt. Jonah Edward Kelley, PFC Billy A. Krowse, Capt. Samuel A. Gibson, 2nd Lt. Leroy Rooks, PFC Keith B. Fox, 1st Lt. Peter A. Novakawski, S/Sgt. Robert W. Couchman, S/Sgt. Dewaine S. McBride, PFC Ray S. Clark, Capt. Clyde H. Trivett, 2nd Lt. William E. Lorenz, and PFC David H. Parker), one of whom, S/Sgt. Jonah Edward Kelly, received the Medal of Honor for his actions at the Battle of Kesternich.

Camp Grohn became the largest forced displacement camp, housing as many as 5,000 people prior to their emigrating to the United States or elsewhere.

Shortly after the formation of the Bundeswehr, Camp Grohn was turned over to the German government in 1955 and renamed Roland Kaserne. Roland Kaserne housed a Bundeswehr logistics school during the Cold War. In 1999, the military base was inactivated and became the campus of Jacobs University.
