= F Company, 310th Infantry Regiment =

F Company, 2nd Battalion, 310th Infantry Regiment, 78th Infantry Division
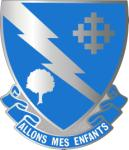
- Regimental Distinctive Unit Insignia
- Active: 1944-1946
- Country: United States of America
- Branch: United States Army
- Type: Infantry Company
- Nickname: "Fighting Foxes"
- Motto: "Tally ho"
- Engagements: World War II: Hurtgen Forest; Battle of Kesternich; Battle of the Bulge; Battle of Remagen; Ruhr Pocket; Allied Advanced to the Rhine

Commanders
- Regiment Commander: Col. Thomas H. Hayes
- Company Commanders: Captain James K. Bowman; Captain William Edmunds; Captain Richard M. Jones; Captain John H. Sharp

F Company was an infantry company in the United States Army's 78th "Lightning" Division's second battalion of the 310th Infantry Regiment. The company was called Fox, which was the sixth letter in the phonetic alphabet used during World War II. The Company participated in three major campaigns: Rhineland, Ardennes-Alsace, and Central Europe. "Combat Diary for Company F, 310th Infantry, 78th Division," a 1947 book written by its members, recounts the wartime experiences of its members.

== History ==
The first Fox Company soldiers arrived at Camp Butner in Butner, North Carolina, on March 9, 1944. On March 27, 1944, Fox Company departed for Camp Pickett in Nottoway County, Virginia. Pickett's land, water, and other resources were surveyed in late 1941; by the end of 1942, more than 1,400 buildings had been built and were in use, including approximately 1,000 enlisted barracks and 70 officer's quarters. Here at Camp Pickett, Fox Company was trained and prepared for combat by Captain John H. Sharp.

== Composition ==
Fox Company was composed of a Company Headquarters, 3× Rifle Platoons, and a Weapons Platoon. Fox Company left the United States with 189 men; 454 men are listed as having belonged to the company by the war's end, due to transfers and replacements. 53 men were killed in action, and 164 wounded in action. With a 47% casualty rate throughout their 125 days of combat.

Fox Company Officers 12 December 1944 - To - 8 May 1945 - * Denotes K.I.A
Name & Rank	Name & Rank	Name & Rank	Name & Rank	Name & Rank
Captain James K. Bowman *	1st Lt. William J. Barton	1st Lt. Donald Horsh	2nd Lt. Hubert J. Arsenault	2nd Lt. Cornelius G. Hinchey
Captain William Edmunds	1st Lt. Joseph Coombs	1st Lt. Richard E. Neuman	2nd Lt. Lester J. Asher	2nd Lt. Robert Mattox
Captain Richard M. Jones	1st Lt. Dallas E. Dimmer	1st Lt. Robert Tastor	2nd Lt. Burrel B. Budden *	2nd Lt. Fitzhugh Wallace
Captain John H. Sharp	1st Lt. Robert Endress	1st Lt. Howard R. Walton Jr.	2nd Lt. Roger T. Duncan	

== Battle of Kesternich ==
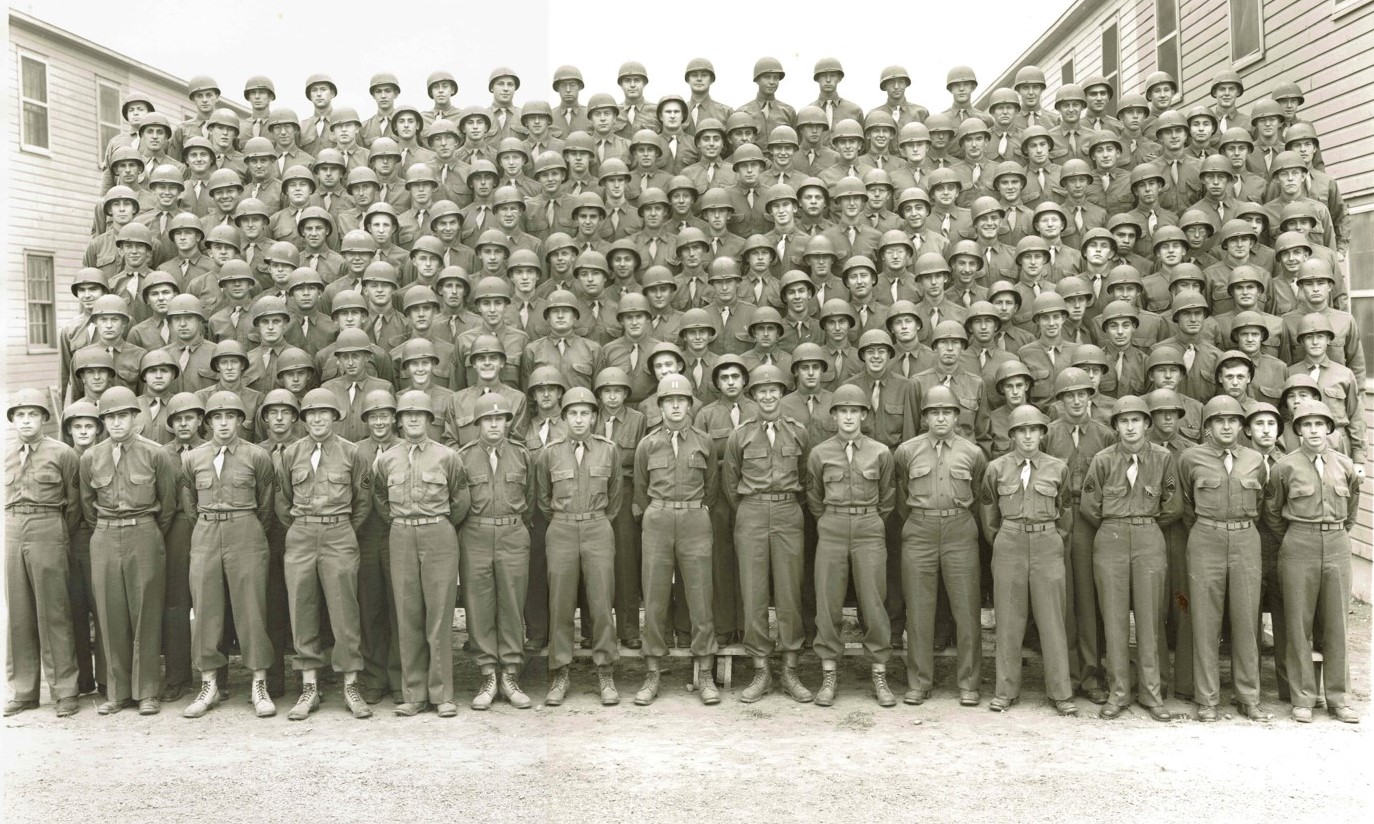
Photo of Fox Company, Camp Pickett 1944

According to the overall Allied plan, the 9th Army was to break through the Cologne Plain, where the flat terrain was ideal for armored divisions to dash the Rhine. The north-flowing Roer River and the three big dams on the upper Roer near Schmidt were a barrier that had to be seized and held. The attack was on December 13 in the region of Lammersdorf. The first town that the Fox Company entered was Pastenbach; when they left on January 13, it was freezing, and the snow that had fallen three days earlier was frosted over and was deceptively thick. They settled in for the night after entering Simmerath further to the west.

The Company was awakened by rifle fire early on December 14; patrols were organized and sent out to find the snipers, but to no avail. Captain John H. Sharp called his Platoon leaders, Lieutenants William J. Barton, Burrel B. Budden, Donald Horsch, and T-Sgt John D. Loos, and gave them the plan for the next move. With the first Platoon in reserve, the second Platoon was selected as the base platoon and launched. It was followed by the third—Company Headquarters—and fourth Platoon. The Company moved through a field to the west of Kesternich and took up position along a road that was submerged, providing protection from enemy fire. Fox reorganized rapidly and secured their position. All four Platoon leaders had become casualties. Sgts. Frank A. Leonard, Claude E. Blackwell, George A. Roman, and Horst took over the Platoons. As morning came on December 15, a much-depleted Fox Company of around seventy men moved towards Kesternich again. Fox advanced to an old sunken road bordered by more hedge-rows. They came upon the crest of a hill, and before Fox lay Kesternich. They continued into the town's outskirts after climbing a short slope. When they entered the village, they were surprised to be met with little to no small arms or artillery fire. Fox seized the target with minimal resistance.

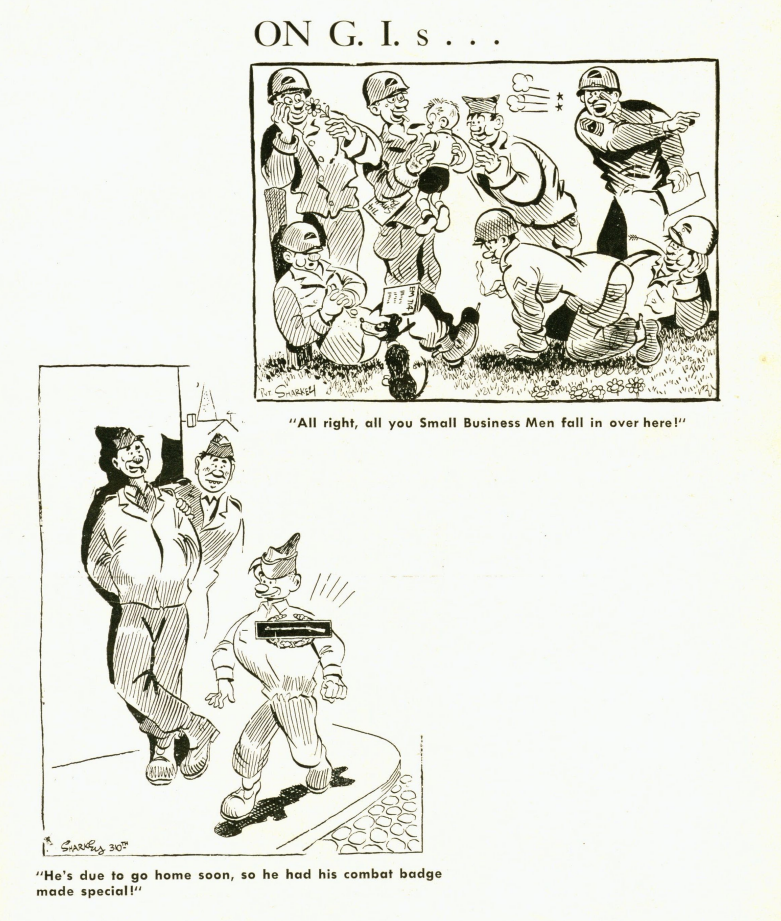
Cartoon by Pfc. Neil M. Sharkey

Around 1300, Company "E" reached the eastern edge of Kesternich with less than half of its initial troop strength and made every effort to set up defenses. Company "G," also with significantly reduced strength, reorganized and managed to hold the town's center. At midnight on December 15, Lt. Col. Creighton E. Likes took over the 2nd Battalions, 309th and 310th Infantry. These battalions were to attack and take control of the town of Kesternich with a platoon of tanks and a platoon of tank destroyers attached. The attack started at 0700 hours in the early morning hours of December 15. Company F moved east and encountered a minefield near a pillbox that was neutralized earlier in the day. After avoiding the minefield, it moved south and into the town, where it encountered the same grueling house-to-house combat as Company G. Around 1400 hours, it had cleared the southern sector. At least 500 Volksgrenadiers participated in the German counter-attack on the 2nd Battalion, 310th Infantry, which started around 1615 and lasted until early December 16. In Fox's area of town, the counterattack lasted for about an hour and a half. After the Germans stopped firing, the men got back to work digging the foxholes. By the time Fox Company realized how serious the situation was, they were cut off from allied forces and surrounded by an enemy who had vowed to seize and hold this town at all costs. Eleven men were added as reinforcements around 1830, placing them on the far left. Around that time, Sgt. Isidor Tarnofsky reported to the C.P. that he had a minor injury to his left elbow but refused to be taken to the aid station. First Sergeant Albert J. Rosenblatt advised Isidor Tarnofsky to remain in the C. P. to ensure his safety. However, he disregarded this advice because he felt assisting his squad in reloading clips and magazines was necessary. When Tarnofsky returned, he started to lead his squad and carried out other duties; an immediate hit on his foxhole killed him, and Pfc Walter Trutko was seriously injured by the blast. For his actions, Isidor Tarnofsky would be awarded the Silver Star. With only two officers left, the NCOs took over many jobs besides their own. A meeting of all Platoon Sgts was called, and each Platoon was given a house to use as a perimeter defense and shelter from artillery and snipers. Fox quickly conducted a reconnaissance and discovered they were completely surrounded.

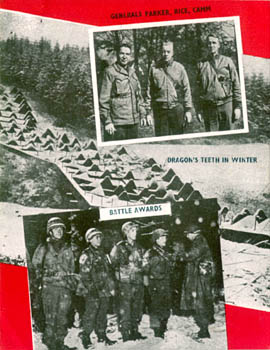
(Top) Generals Edwin P. Parker, John K. Rice, Frank Camm, (Bottom) F Company soldiers receiving battle awards.

Every morning about daybreak, artillery — Allied and enemies- would fall into Fox Company's makeshift defense area. Nightly, two-man patrols were sent out to contact friendly forces, but although most of them got through safely, no one ever returned. Over half of the guys had trench foot, and their condition only deteriorated as time went on. The injured men had to crawl to their posts because they could not walk there. They could not put their shoes back on after taking them off since their feet were three times the size of the typical person's. To make matters worse, it was freezing, and no fires were authorized due to the possibility of enemy detection. By the fourth day, virtually every man had trench foot, and several were in excruciating pain and crying nonstop. A friendly patrol sent by Battalion C.P. in the late afternoon of December 19 came across Fox Company. T-Sgt. Wilbur Horst and Pfc. Ivan E. Eikenberry volunteered when Captain Sharp called for two volunteers for another patrol on the fifth day, December 20. In Battalion C. P., another patrol was forming in the meantime (then) T-5 Charles L. Chignoli, having heard the conversation, offered assistance and requested that a litter squad join the patrol. T-Sgt. Wilbur Horst arrived at Battalion C. P. and reported the hardships and problems the soldiers were facing. Horst then led a patrol toward the beleaguered Kesternich garrison, including Lt. Priener, 1st Sgt. Scurlock, T-5 Chignoli, and a litter squad. The patrol reached Fox Company at around 01:00. Early on December 21, a delighted but devastated Fox Company withdrew to Simmerath. The division had this to say about the heroic action of Fox's men:

"The courage with which these men continued to fight for six days without food, water, or communications until rescued is a tribute to the tenacity of 78th doughs."

=== Casualties ===
In 8 days of fighting, the 310th Infantry Regiment lost 542 soldiers, 63 enlisted personnel, and 6 officers Killed In Action. Five officers and 96 enlisted men suffered wounds. 13 officers and 284 enlisted men were Missing In Action. Trench-foot incapacitated 61 enlisted men and 1 officer, and 13 enlisted men were non-combat casualties (including Combat Fatigue).

Fox Company suffered a staggering 149 casualties: 32 killed in action, 44 wounded in action, 18 captured, and 55 non-combat casualties.

Of the Company men who had gone through the 8-day battle of Kesternich, only eight men, 1st Sgt Rosenblatt, T-Sgt Horst, Sgts DiMarco, Clayton, Farnworth, and Pfcs Sharkey, Eikenberry, and Roberts, were still combat-ready. With a few Fox men who had not been through Kesternich, these eight men withdrew to Raeren Belgium, where S-Sgt Dallas E. Dimmer, the machine-gun section sergeant, received a Battlefield Commission.

Fox Company departed for a bivouac site in Lammersdorf, Germany, on December 25.

== Roer river campaign ==
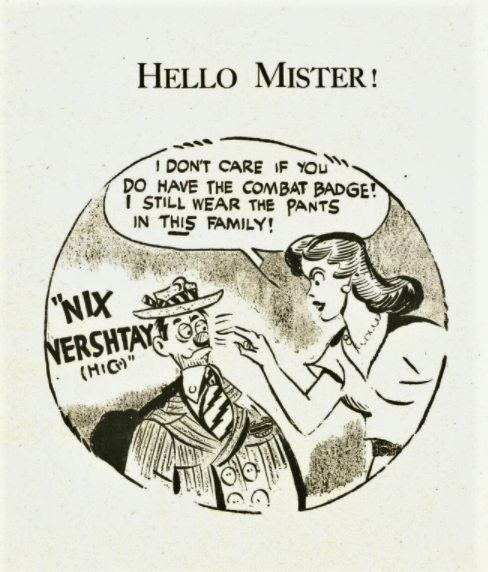
Cartoon by Pfc. Neil M. Sharkey

Most of January 1945 was spent resting and participating in tank-Infantry training. On January 7, they departed Lammersdorf for Roetgen by truck, bouncing around the Monschau district until entering the Division reserve. Roetgen was the first German town under American control; Americans arrived in the village in September 1944. In Roetgen, the men got much-enjoyed visits by the Red Cross Club mobile, with donuts and coffee for everyone. It is here, too; the men got a chance to listen to some tunes by the Andrews Sisters; more importantly, though, the men could ease up, knowing they were safe from German shells. They left Roetgen via truck on January 20, 1945, and made it to Lammersdorf the same day. They only stayed briefly since that night; the men marched to Rollesbroich. The move from Rollesbroich was made the night of January 28; the weather was awful; it was bitter cold, and because of the snow drifts, the Company's supplies had to be pulled by sled. The Company arrived in Lammersdorf the same night, where it reorganized for further attacks against the enemy. Some men held up in an old Church were surprised the following day to see uninvited guests in the form of Germans praying in the same church.

Fox Company didn't have to wait long to get an opportunity to engage the enemy; at 05:30 on January 30, the Company launched an offensive 2 miles east of Konzen, Germany. The men advanced, pushing through waist-deep snow drifts while carrying bandoleers, hand grenades, satchel charges, rocket shells, and Bangalore torpedoes. At the time of the attack, each man wore a white snowsuit. They quickly became so torn and ragged that they were more of a burden than an aid. The 1st Platoon was assigned four flame-throwing British Churchill tanks; however, mines destroyed these tanks at the first troop shelter. Tanks were also sent to the other Platoons, but they, too, were limited in action. At around 1000 hours, a blizzard arrived, freezing up practically every rifle and BAR in the Company, rendering them worthless. Despite the overwhelming odds, the Company managed to secure seven pillboxes, one troop shelter, an abandoned factory, and roughly 150 prisoners. The Company stayed at the factory it had captured that evening, January 30. However, nobody slept well that night; Only a tiny portion of the factory could only be used, and in the small spaces, the Company had to take turns sleeping. The Company began descending through the woods to Hammer on the Roer at 1530 on February 2, 1945. A six-man patrol was dispatched across the Roer to gather vital intelligence on the enemy, but it encountered strong opposition and was forced to turn around. Units of the 102nd Cavalry relieved the Company at Hammer, from where "F" Company boarded trucks and rode to Rollesbroich.

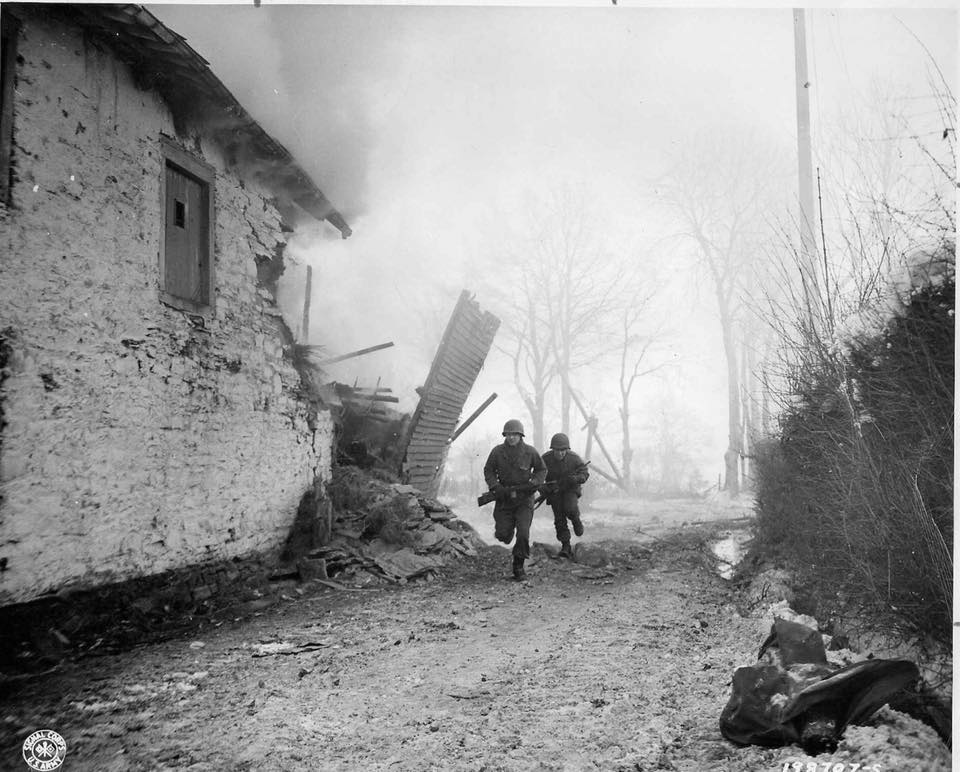
Two GIs during the Battle of Schmidt

Early on February 9, the fox men were prepared to leave the positions, but they were instructed to return to their shelters and wait for further orders. After dinner, they quickly set out for a sugar beet farm from which they could view the devastated town of Schmidt. The German shells started thundering again as soon as the men began digging in the beet field. The Germans had heavily mined this region, and "Achtung, Minen!" signs were widespread. They remained in the field of beets until the next day when they left for Schmidt. As soon as the soldiers began to move, a battery of 81-Mm mortars unleashed a continuous stream of shells over their heads. After a bloody battle, other battalions of the Regiment broke through the highly defended northern end of the town, cleaned it out, and proceeded past. 500 German soldiers had been killed or captured or dispersed. The Company was stationed in the town's cellars and devastated homes. Lt. Richard M. Jones led the First Platoon, Lt. Dallas E. Dimmer led the Fourth, Lt. Richard Neuman led the Third, and Lt. Roger T. Duncan joined Fox Company. The Company's executive officer was Lt. Robert Tastor. Fox was then informed of the impending drive through the Cologne Plains, and the men underwent training in the woods southwest of Schmidt in Eicherscheid. In one of the training sessions, Lt. Bowman introduced a group of men who had distinguished themselves through outstanding initiative and bravery in the fighting that had taken place up to that point: "I am recommending Pfc George E. Hershberger for a Bronze Star for his high level of courage," S-Sgt Donald G. Warner ("Because of his small size, you would not judge him to be a real fighter, but do not underestimate him"), S-Sgt Leonard H. Hampton ("A humorous, good-natured fellow, but a real fighter"), and Pfc William C. Crates ("He can really lay down a stream of fire from his BAR").

Units of the 309th arrived at their objective, the massive Schwammanauel Dam, just before midnight on February 9. Examination revealed that the Dam had not undergone any demolitions. The Dam, erected in 1934 primarily for defensive reasons, is 188 feet in height and 1000 meters in width. The five-tiered earthen staircase is strengthened by a reinforced concrete core over 1000 feet thick at the base. The 22,000,000,000 gallons of backup water would have threatened any river crossing operation. All the settlements along the Roer from Heinbach to Doermund would have been submerged if the Germans had unleashed this mass of water, and anyone who tried to cross the river would committing suicide. The sluiceway had a blown bridge just above it; the control houses had been obliterated. The reservoir was emptied, and the river's water level increased as water poured through the penstock and into the river. Nevertheless, the possibility of devastation and flooding was eliminated, and the Division achieved a goal that the American First Army and Ninth Army failed to accomplish in the Hurtgen Forest months before. Maj. Gen. C. R. Huebner, Commander of the V Corps, offered the Division kind praise after the capture of the Dam. "Although the 78th Infantry Division is relatively new in combat, you have given ample proof that in future operations, you will add new honors to those you have already achieved in this."

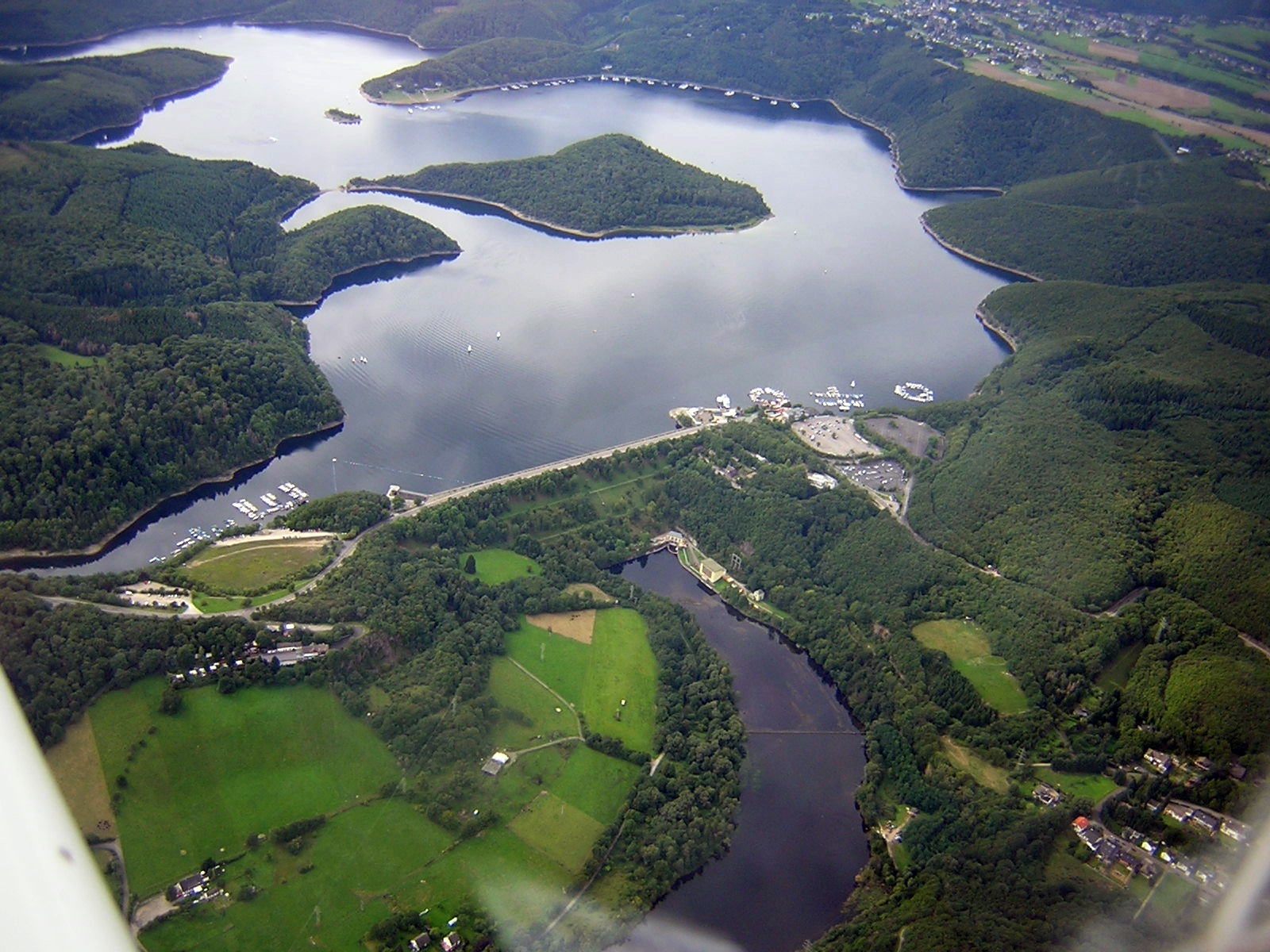
Aerial shot of the Rur Dam, Schwammenauel and Rur Reservoir

In one of his programs, the well-known radio commentator Gabriel Heattor spent considerable time complimenting the Division for "its wonderful successes." The Division's actions were featured in newspapers across the nation. The soldiers preparing to assault in the north would not be in danger if the Dam remained in Allied hands; and Fox Company was tasked with ensuring that the recently captured prize would remain in Allied hands. Therefore, they departed Schmidt on February 23 to establish themselves at the north end of the Dam. A portion of the Company functioned out of a once-beautiful restaurant; Fox men could undoubtedly imagine the public gatherings that must have occurred there during the peak of Nazism. Squads would swap turns watching over the tunnel house. The men examined the reservoir's water level every half-hour to provide crucial information to those preparing the major assault to their north. On February 23, the First and Ninth Armies launched a quick and effective advance across the Roer River and onto the Cologne Plains.

== Roer to Rhine ==
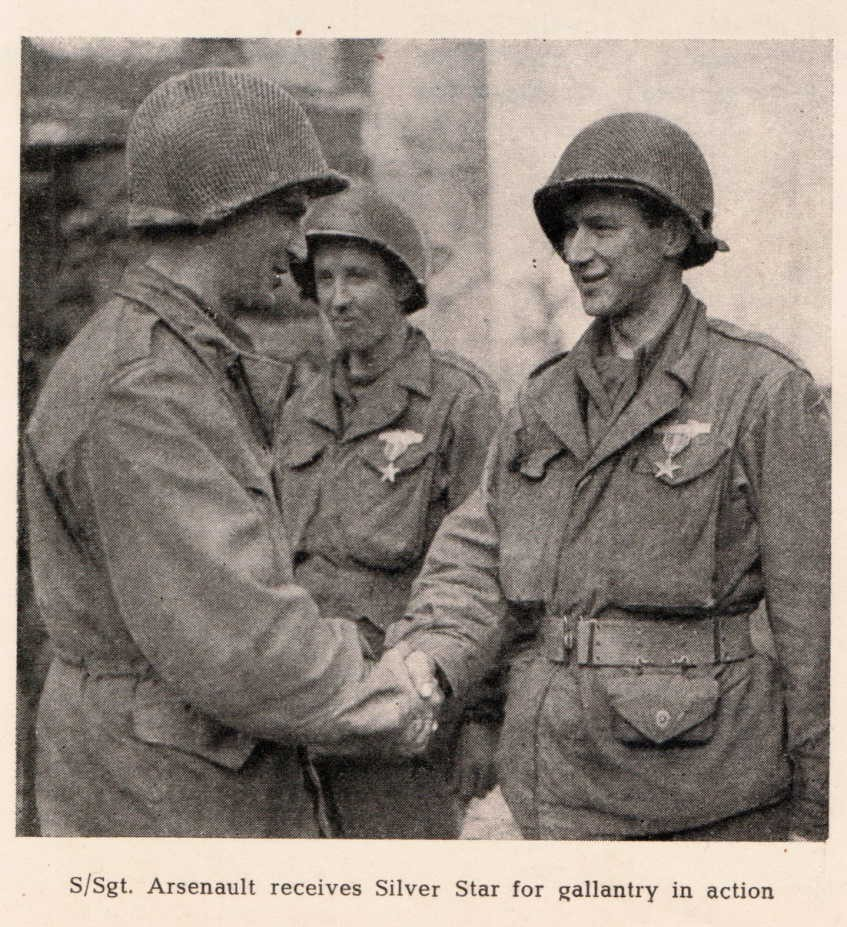
2nd Lt. Hubert J. Arsenault receiving the Silver Star

American tanks and infantry could stream into the Cologne plain thanks to American wins and advance in the Monschau region, near the Roer River, giving them a clear shot across the Rhine River, and into the heart of Germany. This thrust into German territory would include the 78th "Lightning" Division. On March 3, they left Mariawald Abbey and traveled toward Heimbach, which had been heavily bombarded. The Company established itself on the outskirts of the town. Because of broken water lines, the streets were overrun entirely with water. The next day, while still a part of Combat Command "A" of the 9th Armored Division, they left Vlatten. They started an arduous day-long forced march to the unopposed cities of Wollersheim, Embken, Fussenich, and Geich. The Company spent the entire night in Geich before departing again in the early hours of March 5. Euskirchen, a sizable city, had been captured by the Third Battalion. Without a struggle, Zulpich and Elsig were captured. Fox received an unexpected reward when many boxes of cookies were taken from a store. Units of the 9th Armored Division were being held up between the Erft canal and Kuchenheim town. Fox Company had trouble crossing the canal because the bridge had been destroyed, but they eventually made it to a large factory where they waited for the promised tank support. Despite waiting for almost an hour, no tanks appeared. Snipers appeared to be firing from workplaces, homes, and fields all around. The first and second platoons, the third on the right, and the fourth in support were to be in the attack on Kuchenheim.

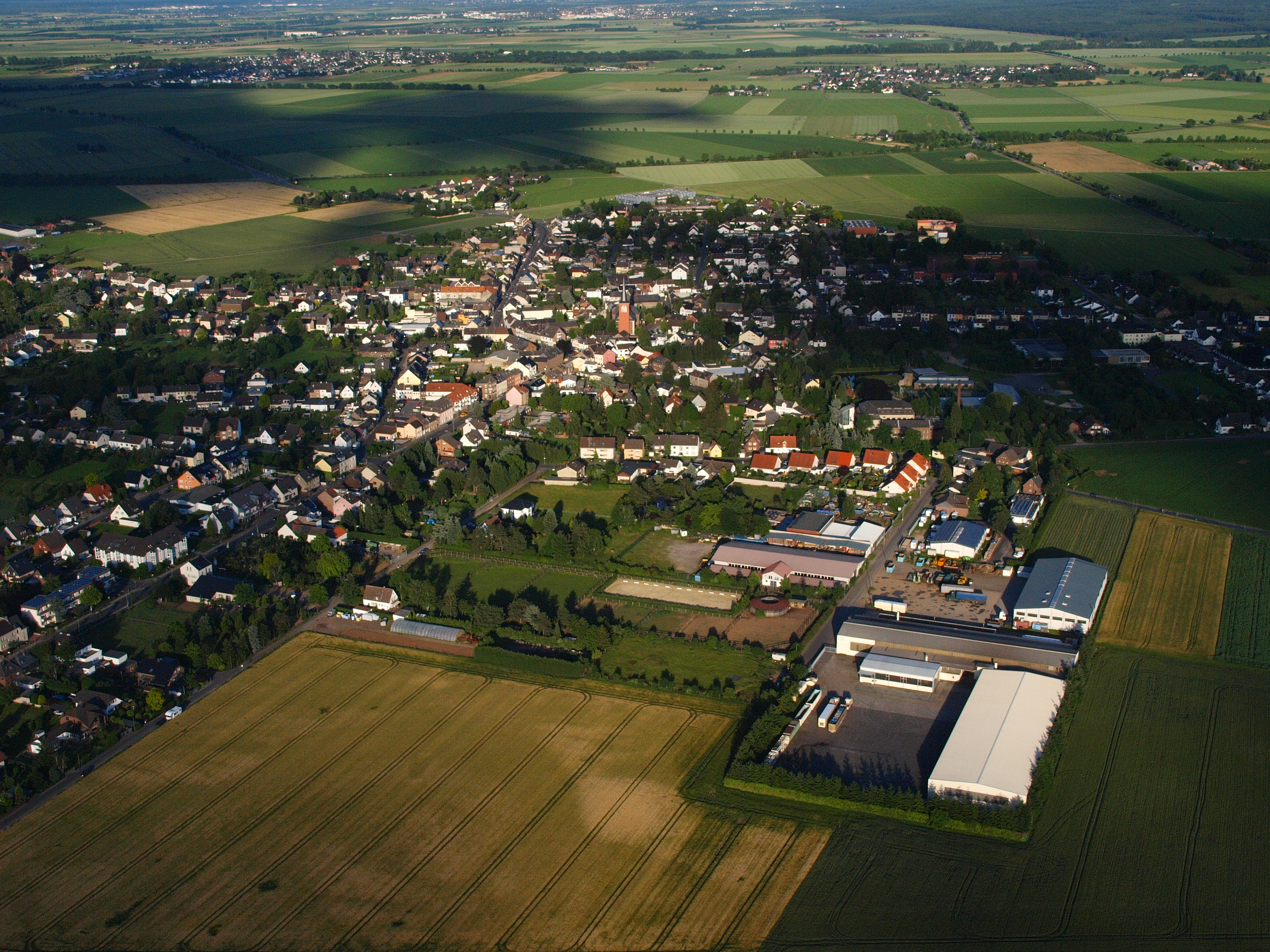
Kuchenheim

Lt. Bowman exclaimed, "The hell with the tanks; we will take this damn town without them!" There was just one route to the main point of resistance, about 200 yards over a wide-open field. A train track was on the left and parallel to their line of attack. Along this track, several enemies were dug in; Fox company suffered severe casualties before these threats were eliminated. A few yards from the factory, Lt. Roger T. Duncan was wounded. 2nd Platoon suffered significant casualties; Pfcs William T. Puhl and Daniel G. Dailey were fatally wounded, and S-Sgt Wade R. Peeler and Pfc Billie Brown were wounded during the opening exchanges of fire. Many members of the 1st Platoon were killed or wounded, Pfcs William C. Crates and Rosario J. Hussereau were killed, and S-Sgt Oren D. Armentrout, Cpl. Fredrick A. Crowthers, and T-5 Joseph Fanaras were wounded. T-5 Clarence F. Wells, a bazooka man lying flat on his stomach, had a bullet penetrate the front of his helmet, nick his wool hat, and emerge from the back of his helmet. Finally, T-5 Gilbert E. Wunrow could direct the tank support forward; they progressed for about 100 yards before stopping. They fired 75 mm rounds into the town's buildings to drive the snipers away. S-Sgt Edward M. Louchlin, Pfc Jamie E. Smith, and T-4 Charles E. Messick from the 3rd Platoon were also killed before the town was cleared.

C. O. James K. Bowman, who was promoted to Captain that morning, was killed by a sniper's bullet from the town's right side.

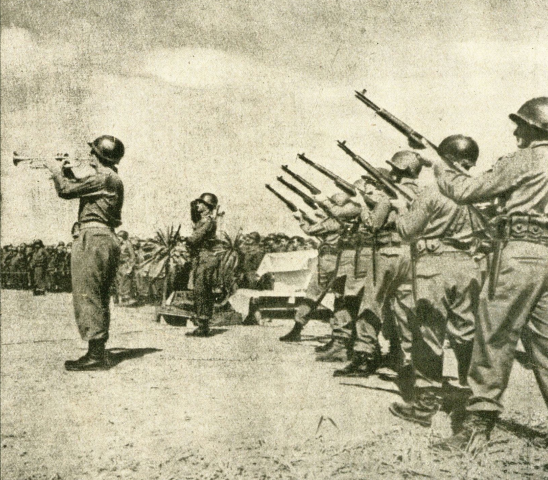
James K. Bowman's funeral

Pfc George E. Hershberger informed Lieutenant Richard M. Jones that he was the new C. O. Despite their sadness over Lt. Bowman's passing, the men persisted. Sgt. Cook led his unit in clearing out several particularly challenging sniper locations, where two snipers were killed, and the same number were wounded. T/5 Joseph Fanaras controlled the first platoon's third squad as they neutralized snipers. By repeatedly launching 75 mm shells into the points of resistance, the Tank Destroyers made a significant contribution to the final clearing of the town. There would not be much time for relaxation, as they had to leave Kuchenheim and join the Battalion before nightfall. After passing through Wiedesheim and Odendorf, they arrived in Oberdress (taken by E Company and G Company). In Oberdress, the men relieved G Company personnel. Fox traveled from Oberdress to Rheinbach in the late afternoon of March 6, where they spent the night. On March 7, Fox Company, still a component of the 9th Armored, boarded half-tracks and began the arduous journey to Heimersheimm, Ersdorf, and Wormersdorf. Then Fox Company rode forward and seized the towns of Altendorf, Gelsdorf, Vettelhoven, Bolingen, Ringen, Bingen, Heppingen, and Gimmengen.

== Remagen Bridgehead ==
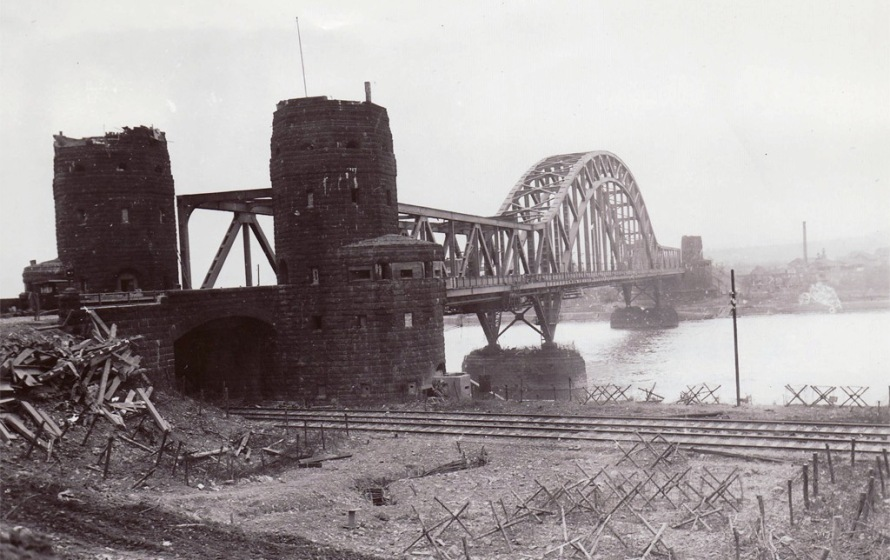
The Ludendorff Bridge at Remagen from the east bank of the Rhine

Fox Company departed with a platoon of light tanks on March 8, 1945, with the assistance of a platoon of machine guns from How Company. Their objective was Lohndorf. The tanks caused significant damage to the German garrison, and allowed the town to be taken with little resistance. At this point, the men had no idea the Ludendorff bridge at Remagen, just 4 Miles north-west, was intact and captured just a day before by the 9th Armored Division. The 1st Battalion, 310th, started to cross at midnight on the 7th and continued into the morning of the 8th. On March 9, the Company returned to Heimersheim and awaited further instruction On March 10, shortly after midnight, they departed Heimersheim and traveled through Bodendorf's suburbs before arriving in Remagen. The Ludendorff Bridge, which for the next few days became the most famous structure on earth, loomed above. A shell struck the bridge's steel girders as the men approached the heavily bombed structure, sending countless sparks into the night sky.

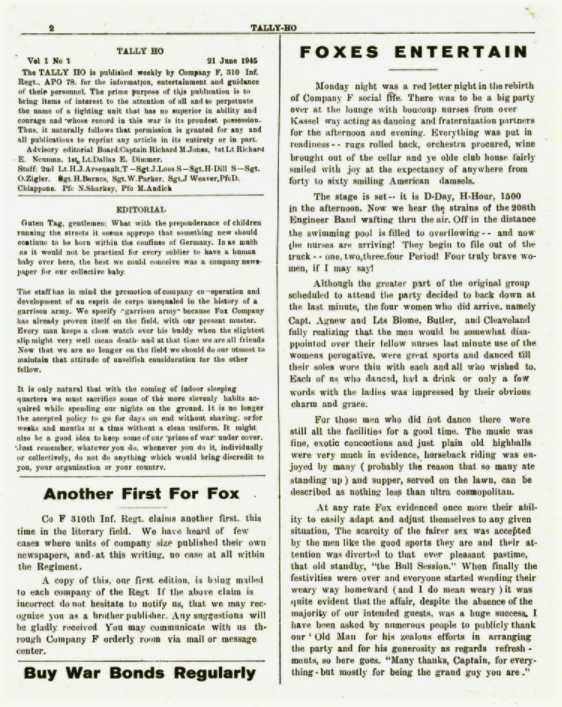
"Tally-Ho" Newspaper page 1

From the bridge, they made a right and traveled three-quarters of a mile to Kasbach along a road that ran along the river's edge. They were to follow another unit into Ohlenberg, and wait for orders there. The company launched its mission once again on March 11 in the morning. Despite being a small town, Kretzhaus was meaningful because it provided access to the famed Autobahn. The men struggled through the rain while carrying spools of wire and ammo. They kept moving towards the assembly area in a wooded area where each company prepared for the assault on Dustemich Hill and Kretzhaus Junction. The company started to advance, and the enemy launched round after round of heavy artillery at Fox to push them back across the river, and casualties were immediate. T-5 Gherkins (Med Det) and Pfc Watson from the Second Platoon were hit, and a few minutes later, Pfc's William D. Rose, Hewitt J. Saucier, Onnie D. Cooley, Benito H. Benavidez, and Albert H. Kitchen also suffered injuries. Dustemich Hill finally collapsed, and E Company dug in on its peaks; this was a substantial advantage because it permitted excellent observation of Kretzhaus and the surrounding area.

The assault was scheduled for March 12, early in the morning. As Fox Company prepared to attack Kretzhaus, G Company was supposed to seize 500 yards of strategically important ground to the north-west of the target. Fox then moved forward along the road for about 300 yards before what first appeared to be a bank of dirt revealed itself as a Tiger tank, which began spewing shells. The Germans rained down "88's" to push back the armor. The attack stopped in a sizable wooded area in front of the target, primarily made up of a sawmill and several houses. The company encountered heavy artillery bombardments, cross-fire from machine guns, and direct tank fire. Shells were bursting all around Lts. Richard M. Jones and Richard E. Neuman, Sgts. Whiteside, Donald G. Warner, Otties L. Zigler, and Pfc. Leonard Blitz as they were pinned down behind a pile of lumber. Surprisingly, nobody was hurt. A shell from an enemy tank was fired through a sawmill as some of the Fourth Platoon advanced toward it. They held out for about three hours before the enemy artillery worsened. The enemy attack, which consisted of 4 tanks and a Company, was driven off, but Fox withdrew to more favorable positions. The Company withdrew to the railroad spur and dug in; only about 50 men were left. The price was high: in the fierce fighting, Pfcs Federico Gurterrez, Gilbert A. Sandoval, Julious C. Pack, Harold I Hope, Clifford B. Kruse, Albert J. Harvin, Carl J. Katscha, Herbert W. Shwenk, Scott, Cecil O. Grabe, Gerald F. Gardner, Cook, T-4 Vincent J. Manganaro, and T-5 Herbert Ferdman (Med Det) were all wounded. Pfc John Maskell Jr. was killed while giving medical attention to T-5 Herbert Ferdman and Everett Roberts was killed by Artillery fire.

== End of WWII ==
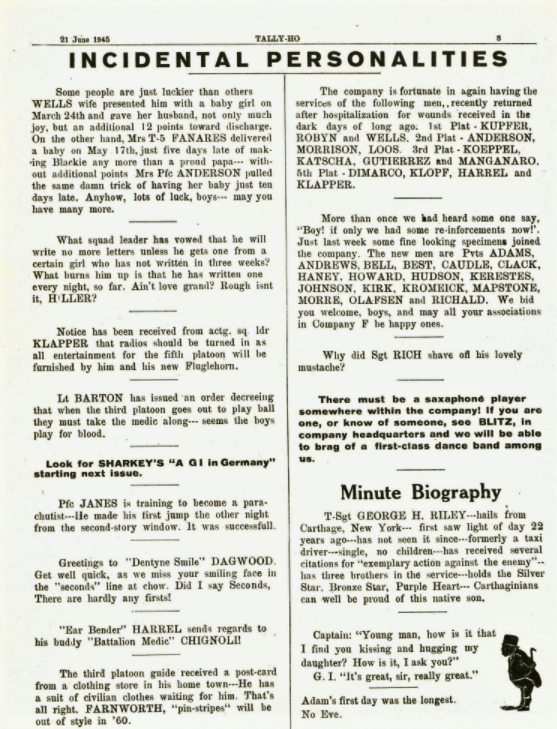
"Tally-Ho" Newspaper page 2

The following day, March 13, the Company stayed put and awaited new orders. S-Sgt. Alma R. Farnworth's return and the arrival of fresh troops strengthened the Company. The bridgehead had grown to cover 100 square miles by March 17. The main crossing points could no longer be effectively fired upon by enemy artillery. On March 17, Fox left and, after an arduous march, entered Ittenbach, a town with a view of the Autobahn, where they relieved an armored unit. The men joined the 2nd Battalion that night after being relieved by the 1st Division and about 1800 yards northwest of Ittenbach.

Fox left the following morning for Oberdollendorf on the Rhine (March 20). The men were exhausted from the long march to the city, but the "spirits" of the area soon lifted their spirits because everyone could indulge in the city's abundance of wine, champagne, cognac, and whiskey. Fox Company then got a new C.O., Captain William Edmunds, the former C.O. of A Company. Around three the following day, the Company started moving toward Neiderpleis, a sizable town before Siegburg. They encountered several small farming settlements along the way, and they all quickly fell. On March 28, Lt. Jones became the Executive Officer of E Company. The Company moved to front-line locations with a clear view of Siegburg at Vilich-Muldorf and Meindorf . The majority of the men attended church on Easter Sunday. A round shrieked down on the church as the men emerged, indicating that the Germans must have heard from the population that they were inside.

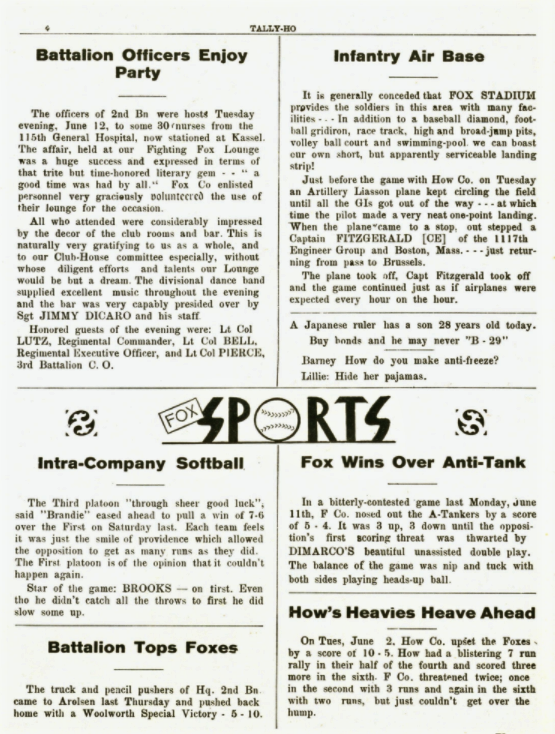
"Tally-Ho" Newspaper page 3

There was yet another advancement on April 5. The First Platoon's task was to clear Katzwinkle, while the other platoons were tasked with securing the high ground on both sides of the town. The missions were completed following an intense firefight. The enemy resisted vigorously, and much of the fighting occurred through densely forested terrain, making the going challenging. The men dug in, prepping defenses despite the heavy rain. Sgt. Harry Gales was hurt while attending to a wounded friend. The First Platoon front was the target of a significant enemy counterattack the following morning at 7:20. The friendly medic "Mike" Murphy, and Pfcs John N. Hill, Lynn C. Hancock, and Cpl. Fred B. Bigbee were killed. "Mike" had earned the respect of the men at Fox Company. On many occasions, the glum foot soldiers were cheered up by his heavy Irish accent. His tireless efforts in caring for the injured men were respected and admired. T-3 (then T-4) Louis C. Chignoli's medical staff did an excellent job overall. Cpl Dominic Benedetti and Pfcs. J.G "Doc" Brown and Archie E. French, Greatly aided the numerous accomplishments of the company. The following day, April 7, Fox continued and arrived a few yards south of Friesenhagen, where they spent the following two days in front-line positions. Fox relocated to Windenburg on the same day; where they went into Battalion reserve. The men anticipated staying for a short while, but the following day, as usual, they were once more on the move, this time to Wieferstine. A platoon of light tanks from the 774th Tank Battalion, led by Lt. Bowen, joined the Company at Wieferstine. They then continued through a wooded area, where they managed to capture Unt, Obr Nadrigen, and Woldsberg.

On April 16, Fox Company took part in the Ruhr pocket's closure and seized Wuppertal. In the remainder of April through May 8, when the war in Europe came to an end, Fox Company took part in the occupation of the newly captured regions.

== Company newspaper ==
During the occupation of Germany, Fox Company became the first company in the 310th Infantry regiment to publish regiment-wide newspapers, named the "Tally-Ho newspaper." The first paper was published on June 21, 1945. Captain Richard M. Jones had this message to tell the men.

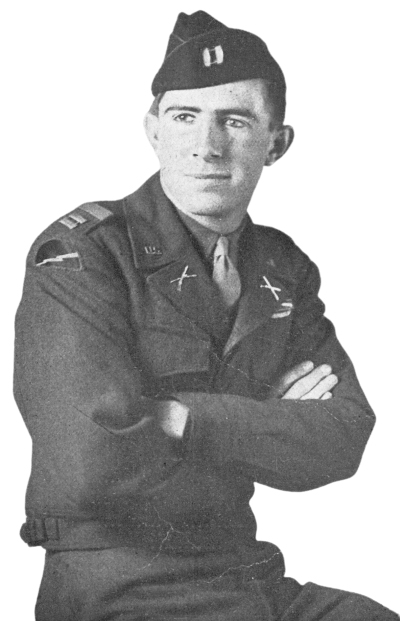
Capt. Richard M. Jones

FROM THE C. O.

The beginning of this message should go something like this: "Men of Fighting Fox, etc. But that type of opening appears far too often in "pep talks", and to me it carries little or no sentiment or sincerity. What I really want to say is this Fellows, this is the first opportunity that I have had to tell you really how I feel toward you my boys We have come through a lot in the past, and during that time I have become more attached to you and Fox Company. Most of you already know that I enjoy nothing more than having the feeling that I "am just one of the boys". When day after day I see guys like you go out and risk your lives, obey commands without a whimper and spit in death's eye. I feel nothing but pride and humble gratefulness for having the honor of being your commanding officer.

The older men will not soon forget names like Tarnofsky, Captain Bowman, Crates, Hussereau, York, Carlson and all the others: neither will you forget the heroism and courage that covers their name with glory. If and when we enter combat again let us do our job just as well as they did theirs, and we will assure our- selves that they did not die in vain. There is no doubt in my mind that this company possesses a degree of courage and plain "guts" that no other company can equal or surpass.

To the new men this may seem like a repetition of many things you have heard since entering the division, but please do not be misled. I am not giving any "rah rah" speech; my objective is to pay tribute to a grand company that has done a splendid job. I want to personally welcome you to the outfit and I am certain that you will catch the true spirit and enthusiasm that has always accompanied this unit.

== Notable personnel ==
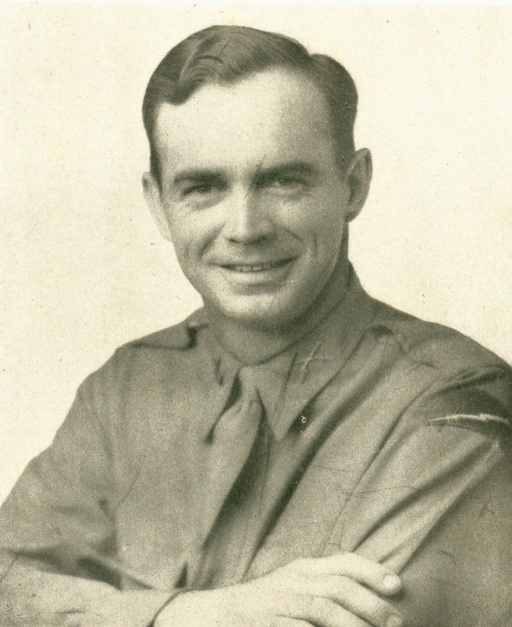
Captain James K. Bowman

Captain James K. Bowman was born on 30 Nov 1911 in Evanston, Illinois. He went to Evanston Township High School and graduated from Lafayette University, where he was an intercollegiate swimming champion in 1943. He married Barbara Ann Spenser on 27 Mar 1943 in St Joseph, Michigan. James K. Bowman was killed by sniper fire on March 5, 1945, leading an attack on Kuchenheim in North Rhine-Westphalia, Germany. When tank support didn't appear for the attack, he said, "The hell with the tanks; we'll take this damn town without them!" He is buried in the Henri-Chapelle American Cemetery in Plot: D, Row: 3, Grave: 31. His decorations include the Silver Star, Bronze Star, Purpleheart, and the Combat Infantryman Badge.

2nd Lt. Hubert J. "Jack" Arsenault was born on 20 Feb 1916 in Bath, Sagadahoc, Maine. Hubert Jerome Arsenault married Camille Simone St. Pierre in Maine on July 16, 1938, when he was 22 years old. Arsenault enlisted in the Army on February 24, 1944, in Fort Devens, Massachusetts. He served in the Korean war and he retired as a lieutenant colonel. He died on September 11, 1998, in Seaside, California, when he was 82 years old. He is buried in Arlington National Cemetery in Arlington, Virginia. In Section:68 Grave:4681. He was only 1 of 2 soldiers to receive the British Military Cross in the 310th Infantry Regiment. His decorations include the Silver Star, Bronze Star, Purpleheart, and the Combat Infantryman Badge.

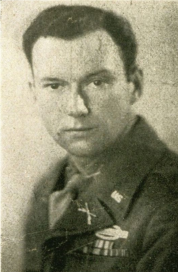
2nd Lt. Hubert J. Arsenault

S/Sgt. Joseph A. Saba Sr. was born on 23 Jan 1922 in Oneida County, New York. Saba enlisted in the US Army on 10 Sep 1940. He served as a light mortar gunner; during the 1st Battle of Kesternich, he administered medical aid to wounded soldiers and used old sheets and clothing found in a house for bandages. He married Rose Roy on 3 Oct 1959 in Utica, New York. He died on 29 Jun 1991, aged 69. His decorations include the Bronze Star & Oak Leaf Cluster, Purpleheart, and the Combat Infantryman Badge.

Sgt. Silvert J. Carlson was born on April 12, 1922, in Dalbo, Minnesota; he was Killed on April 11, 1945, in Unnenberg-Germany. Sergeant Carlson was on patrol in the lead M3 Scout Car on April 11, 1945, when him and Sgt. Samuel A. York went forward to accept the surrender of some Germans waving a white flag; in a cowardly manner, these same Germans shot them down under a flag of truce. He is buried at the Netherlands American Cemetery, in Plot: B. Row: 9. Grave: 12. His decorations include the Bronze Star & Oak Leaf Cluster, Purpleheart & Oak Leaf Cluster, and the Combat Infantryman Badge.

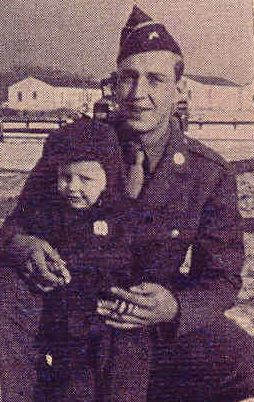
Sgt. Silvert J. Carlson

Sgt. Isidor Tarnofsky was born on 16 September 1912 in Queens County, New York. Isidor was killed in action on 14 December whilst assaulting Kesternich; he was awarded the Silver Star for his actions.

CITATION SILVER STAR For gallantry in action on 14 December 1944 in the vicinity of Kesternich, Germany. During an enemy counterattack in the Kesternich, Germany area, Sgt. TARNOFSKY was wounded in the arm by rifle fire. While en route to the rear, he encountered a Browning Automatic Rifle team protecting the flank of a platoon. The assistant Browning Automatic Rifleman had become a casualty. Sgt. TARNOFSKY, despite his wounds, joined the team and assisted the Browning Automatic Rifleman in keeping the weapon operating at top efficiency. While at this post, Sgt. TARNOFSKY was mortally wounded by 88mm fire. His selfless devotion to duty and grim determination were in accordance with the highest military traditions.

His decorations include the Silver Star, Bronze Star, Purpleheart, and the Combat Infantryman Badge. He is buried in the Montefiore Cemetery in Springfield Gardens, Queens County, New York.

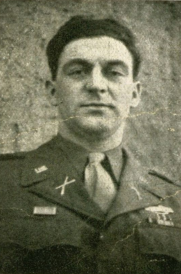
2nd Lt. Cornelius G. Hinchy

2nd Lt. Cornelius G. Hinchy was born on 2 Jul 1924 in Erie County, New York. He enlisted in the United States Army on 9 Mar 1943 in Buffalo, New York. He served in the United States Army Armed Forces until 1965, finishing his career in the United States Army Reserve; he retired as a lieutenant colonel. He died on 22 Nov 2012 (aged 88) in Elbert County, Colorado. He is buried in Elizabeth Cemetery in Elbert County, Colorado. His decorations include the Bronze Star & Oak Leaf Cluster, and the Combat Infantryman Badge.

== Platoon Photos ==
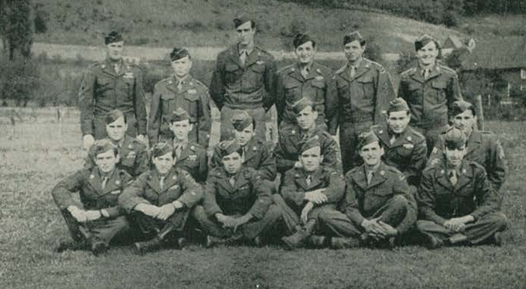
Company Headquarters: Standing: Brandenburg, Putko, Brooks, Cipriani, Caudle, Mason Second row: Beaty, Wells, Kromeich, Verch, Allen, Kushiner First row: Walsh, Heim, Gaveia, Goodson, Albanese, McNamara

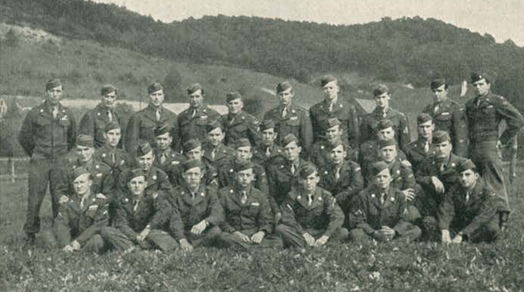
First Platoon: Standing: Loos, Dagwan, Bedenbaugh, Morrison, Stoven, Keow, Colwell, Lerne, Ziegler, Lt. Walton Second row: Ramsey, Dill, Hudson, Johnson, Roiger, Anderson, Deutsch, McBee, Cooley, Jundzil Hazleton, Hill, Nelson, Parsons, McCain First row: Cook, Brooks, Settles, Hartzog, Brown, Smothers, St. Dennis

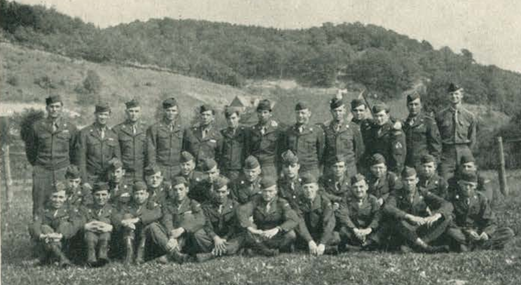
2nd Platoon: Standing: Ritz, Hampton, Bellinger, Long, Booth, Haney, Sandourl, Sass, Atkinson, Schaffner, Erkelenz, Farnworth, Lt. Barton Second row: Risner', Blevins, Koeppel, Andersen, Fizien, Khors, Itoney, Janes, Best, Kowalski, Davis First row: Zigler, Hutchison, Riches, Oechsli, Adams, McLean, McLoughlim, Skillicorn, Gard, Parrish

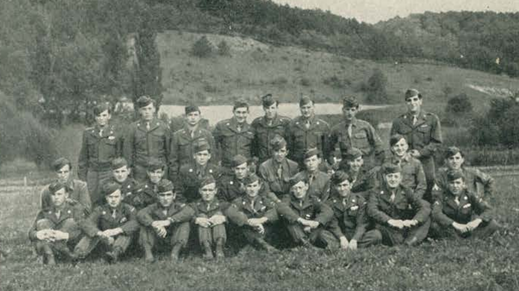
3rd Platoon: Standing: Turnev, Clouse, French, Allen, Riley, Morris, Cognats, Chiappone Second row: Martin, Albert, Moone, Tapp, Kromeich, DiMarco, Howard, McNamara, Mason, Kushiner First row: Hiller, Klopf, Anar, Goodson, Saucier, Potter, Dotson, Davah, Vilzinski

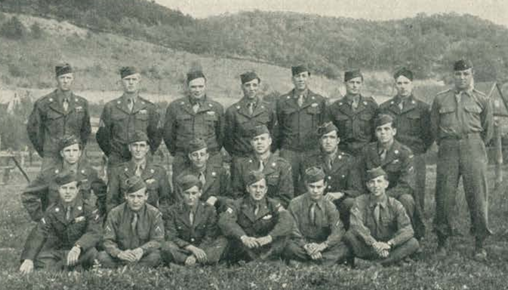
4th Platoon "Weapons Platoon" : Standing: White, Socks, Kirkwood, Depasqua, Jamevson, Hvesko, Lt. Dimmer Second row: Boone, Fretz, Kerestes, Hess, O'Malley, Allen First row: Burton, Hart, Saunders, Merlo, Morgan, Hauenstein

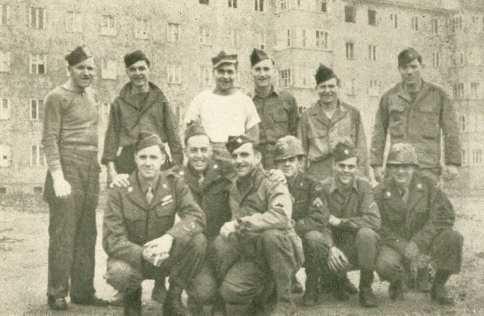
Cooks: Standing (L to R) Wilson, Socia, Johnson, Weaver, Hart, DysonKneeling (L to R) Huff, Mc Arthur, Soares, Bogers, Boucher, Johnson

== Bibliography ==
- Brubeck, W. E. (1946). The story of the 310th infantry regiment, 78th infantry division in the war against Germany, 1942-1945. William E. Brubeck Lewis S. Hollins United States Army.
- Nueman, R. E., 1st Lt. (1945). Combat Diary for Company F, 310th Infantry, 78th Division. U.S. Army. States, U. S., ARMY (1947).
- United States Army, "Blue infantrymen: the combat history of the Third Battalion, 310th Infantry Regiment, Seventy-eighth "Lightning" Division" (1946). World War Regimental Histories. 24.
