= Battle of Kesternich =

1944 battle on the German-Belgian border

First and Second Battles of Kesternich
- Part of World War II
- GIs from the 311th Infantry Regiment in Kesternich, February 1945
| Date | First battle: 13–16 December 1944; Second battle: 30 January-1 February 1945 |
| Location | In and around Kesternich, Germany 50°36′27″N 6°19′45″E |
| Result | German defensive victory in first battle U.S. victory in second battle |

Belligerents
| United States | Germany |

Commanders and leaders
| Major General Edwin P. Parker Jr. | Generalleutnant Eugen König |

Units involved
| 78th Infantry Division; Attached: 709th Tank Battalion (First battle); 736th Tank Battalion (Second battle); 893rd Tank Destroyer Battalion (both battles) | 272. Volksgrenadier-Division; Attached: I. Battalion, 753. Grenadier-Regiment, 326. Volksgrenadier-Division (First battle) |

Strength
| First battle: Two Infantry battalions Two platoons of M4 Shermans; One platoon of M10 tank destroyers Second battle: One infantry battalion One company of M4 Shermans; One platoon of M10 tank destroyers | Elements of two divisions |

Casualties and losses
| First battle: At least 1,500 killed, wounded, or missing Two tanks disabled Second battle: At least 225 killed, wounded, or missing | First battle: At least 150 killed At least 600 captured Second battle: Unknown |

Kesternich is a small village just inside the German border from Belgium. It was the site of two major battles during World War II. These battles are tied to the Siegfried Line Campaign, the Battle of the Huertgen Forest, the Battle of the Bulge, and the assault on the Roer River dams at the outset of Operation Lumberjack.

== Kesternich ==
Kesternich is a small village, which in 1944-1945 consisted of about 112 houses constructed in a method of timber-frame and stucco construction called fachwerkhäuser. Poised on top of a spur ridge, the land inside the village along the main east–west road is relatively flat. The land falls off sharply to the north into a gorge known as the Weidenbachtal, and to the south into a gorge called the Tiefenbachtal. To the east, at the end of the village, the terrain slopes down to the Roer River gorge. Surrounding the village along the ridge was a series of small fields. The houses were not tightly packed, but were surrounded by small yards containing many outbuildings and sheds. The yards, like the farm fields, were often separated by a form of traditional tall, dense hedge that is used as a windbreak. Defenders inside the village commanded excellent fields of fire.

== The First Battle for Kesternich ==
The First Battle for Kesternich took place from 13 to 16 December 1944. This battle pitted the 2nd Battalion of the 309th Infantry Regiment and the 2nd Battalion of the 310th Infantry Regiment of the 78th Infantry Division against units from the 272. Volksgrenadier-Division, including elements of the 326. Volksgrenadier-Division. This attack was part of a greater attack by the First Army's V Corps in an effort to capture the Roer River Dams that included the 78th Infantry Division as well as the 2nd Infantry Division to the south. The attack by the 78th Division interrupted Hitler's plans for the northern (right) shoulder of the Battle of the Bulge. While it may be questionable that the Germans had enough strength to push the attack west of Simmerath and Kesternich, plans were disrupted as the American attack hit the German lines on 13 December. As a result, the northern pivot-point of the German offensive was pushed from Simmerath to south of Monschau.

The 78th Division's Mechanized Reconnaissance Troop and its 311th RCT (Regimental Combat Team) had been attached to the 8th Infantry Division just to the north. For the offensive operations against Kesternich, the 78th Division had the 309th and 310th RCTs, as well as the attached, combat-experienced, 709th Tank Battalion and 893rd Tank Destroyer Battalion.

The 1st Battalion of the 309th RCT was to attack in the direction of Witzerath and Simmerath. The 3rd Battalion was to move on Bickerath and seize the ridge near Simmerath. The 2nd Battalion with its attached tanks was to capture Kesternich. The 2nd Battalion, 310th RCT, was to wait in the woods near Lammersdorf as a reserve.

Since the key objective of Kesternich was considered a tougher assignment, the 2nd Battalion of the 310th was attached to the 309th, giving it four battalions. This left the 310th with two battalions for their blocking assignment at Rollesbroich. A storm the night before left 12 inches of snow on the ground. Temperatures were below freezing. A thick ground fog permeated the landscape making visibility difficult until mid-day.

The attack by the 309th Infantry Regiment was a surprise to the Germans defending the Siegfried Line and the Americans quickly took Bickerath, Paustenbach, Witzerath, and Simmerath. In taking Simmerath, the Americans finally cut the Monschau-Düren highway and severed the Monschau Corridor. They reached the outskirts of Kesternich as darkness fell on 13 December and dug in. However, they were unable to retain their small purchase and withdrew. The 310th was also held at bay, unable to penetrate past the entrance to Rollesbroich. The advance had gone decently on the first day and optimism for operations on the next day ran high.

The 2nd Battalion, 309th Infantry Regiment started their assault on Kesternich on the morning of 14 December. Company E led the attack mounted on one platoon of tanks from the 709th Tank Battalion, Company F followed the tanks, and Company G outposted a hill next to the town. The tanks became bogged down, and Company E dismounted and moved near the village. The attack turned into a stalemate when the Germans pounded all attempted advances with machine gun fire and indirect fire from mortars. The battalion commander Lt. Col. Wilson L. Burley and assistant battalion commander Maj. Mark H. Hudson were both killed, and Capt. Douglas P. Frazier of Company H assumed command of the attack.

The murderous fire on the 309th was relieved somewhat when the 2nd Battalion of the 310th Infantry moved on Kesternich as ordered after noon the same day. The tenacity of the German defense obstructed this attack and it stalled as darkness fell. Results at Rollesbroich were much better for the Americans as the other two battalions of the 310th were able to fully enter the village, capture the pillboxes guarding the village, and consolidate their positions.

At 06:00 on 14 December the 2nd Battalion, 310th Infantry jumped off from Simmerath with the mission of assisting the 2d Battalion, 309th Infantry in the capture of Kesternich. Company E, followed by Company G, advanced on the left (north) side of the Simmerath-Kesternich road. Company F, at dawn, with the support of two M10 tank destroyers, attacked a stubborn pillbox at the west edge of Simmerath which had not been defeated the day before. Following this action Company F proceeded toward Kesternich on the right (south) side of the Simmerath-Kesternich road and to the right of E and G Companies. As Company F came abreast of Company E, approximately nine-hundred yards east of Simmerath, it came upon an antipersonnel minefield. In the meantime E and G Companies had been pinned down by fire from a previously unknown large pillbox at the west edge of Kesternich.

All requests by the 2nd Battalion, 310th Infantry to bring artillery fire on the enemy positions were denied for the reason that it was believed that friendly troops from the 2d Battalion, 309th Infantry were in Kesternich. The situation was so fluid that the 309th's commander did not even know whether or not he had any troops within the town (he did not)

The 2nd Battalion, 310th Infantry, made no further gains on 14 December, and dug in for the night approximately five-hundred yards west of Kesternich.

At 01:00 on 15 December, Lt. Col. Creighton E. Likes, Executive Officer, 309th Infantry Regiment, was placed in command of the 2d Battalion, 309th Infantry, and the 2nd Battalion, 310th Infantry. These battalions, with a platoon of tanks and a platoon of tank destroyers attached, were, as a task force, to launch a coordinated attack to seize the town of Kesternich commencing at 07:00 on 15 December.

The plan for the attack, was to have the tank destroyers improve their positions before daylight so as to bring direct fire on the pillbox at the western outskirts of Kesternich. Following the reduction of the pillbox by a team of engineers, they were to support the attack on Kesternich. Immediately following a preparation of the town by two battalions of field artillery, Company E, 310th Infantry, was to move rapidly, on the road, through Kesternich to the northeast edge of town. Company G, following Company E into town, was to clear the northern portion, then move to the right of Company E and secure the southeast edge of town. Company F was to advance from its present position, south of the Simmerath-Kesternich road, clear the southern portion of the town, then dig in. Tanks were to support the infantry in the attack and then move to the east portion of town where they were to be utilized in defense of any German counterattack.

The 2nd Battalion, 309th Infantry, (still not actually in Kesternich as their objective stated) was to advance and tie in with Company E, 310th Infantry, northeast of Kesternich.

Fire by the tank destroyers kept the pillbox crew from harassing the engineers as they moved into position, and they used a large charge in an effort to reduce the pillbox. The explosion had little penetrating effect on the thick concrete walls, however, the concussion caused the occupants to surrender. The remaining tanks moved to the west edge of town, but did not advance to the east side, or participate in the upcoming house to house fire fights; they encountered Teller mines and two tanks were disabled by German anti-tank fire. The other three tanks retreated.

The attack by the infantry of the 310th commenced on schedule following the artillery preparation. E and G Companies proceeded up the road and into the town. Company E encountered sniper and automatic weapons fire which slowed its progress considerably. It reached its objective, however, about midday. Company G encountered a determined enemy set up in fortified houses. Intense house-to-house fighting resulted in the Company becoming disorganized. Small groups became isolated in separate firefights. Casualties, especially among leaders, were high. Manpower was further weakened by soldiers returning to the rear area with German prisoners. Company G, however, succeeded in clearing the north portion of town and moved to its objective in the southeast edge of town at about 14:00.

Company F moved east and encountered a minefield in the vicinity of the pillbox that was cleared earlier in the day. It skirted the minefield to the south, entered the town and experienced the same house to house fighting as did Company G. It cleared the south portion of town by 14:00.

The German plans for the Battle of the Bulge were threatened by the loss of Kesternich. Generalleutnant Eugen König's 272. Volksgrenadier-Division had begun planning a counterattack the day before. Since they had been assembling for their participation in the Bulge, not all of his strength was available. His organic II. Battalion of the 982. Grenadier-Regiment provided troops for the attack, and the 272. Panzerjägerabteilung provided some armored vehicles (Hetzer tank destroyers and Sd.Kfz. 7/2's). The I. Battalion of the 753. Grenadier-Regiment of the 326. Volksgrenadier-Division, assembling to the south in front of Höfen and Monschau, was loaned to König for the attack and provided additional manpower.

The German counterattack against the 2nd Battalion, 310th Insting of at least 500 Volksgrenadiers began at approximately 16:15 and continued sporadically until the early morning hours of 16 December. At first, the Americans held firm, driving off the frontal attack by the I. Battalion, 753. Volksgrenadier-Regiment. In a classic envelopment maneuver, the II. Battalion, 982. Volksgrenadier-Regiment infiltrated behind the companies of the 310th Infantry inside the village to cut them off from the rear. Those GIs trapped in Kesternich faced German armored vehicles with no means to combat them. Outnumbered, with little ammunition, and cut off from their supplies, the fate of the Americans inside the village was sealed. As darkness fell, the attack by the 753. Grenadier-Regiment gained momentum, advancing steadily on the isolated companies. Once the battalion commander was captured, nearly all of the surviving Americans surrendered, although some men hid away in the houses.

After the attack, over 150 German soldiers lay dead in and around Kesternich. While the American casualties were not nearly as great, virtually the entire fighting strength of the 2nd Battalion of the 310th Infantry were now German POWs. In the end, the fight for the village was described by one GI with the simple statement, "Kesternich was very bloody." The attached troops of the 326. Volksgrenadier-Division were returned to their division for participation in the Battle of the Bulge. With the knowledge that they didn't have the strength to hold the ground they gained, the German force retreated to the east side of the village by early light the next day. Only a small force at the large bunker near the entrance to the village remained to guard their conquest.

Late on 15 December, a counterattack by the 3rd Battalion, 309th Infantry was sent to retake Kesternich and reach any survivors of the 2nd Battalion, 310th Infantry. Isolated fighting by small groups of Americans continued throughout the night. None of the patrols sent out by the 310th Infantry to contact friendly elements to the west returned. When the 309th Infantry entered the town on the morning of 16 December, One officer said later, "Very few men from the [2nd of the 310th] were found in any of the houses, none [of them] were alive."

During the seven days of fighting for the village between 13 and 19 December, the 78th Infantry Division lost approximately 1,515 dead, wounded, missing and injured, according to the division's records. German losses in dead and captured, as confirmed by the 78th Infantry Division, were approximately 770, not counting wounded or missing.

== The Second Battle for Kesternich ==
The Second Battle for Kesternich took place from 30 January 1945 to 1 February 1945. In the battle, the American 311th Infantry Regiment fought against the 272. Volksgrenadier-Division. This time the offensive was conducted under William H. Simpson's Ninth Army. Over the preceding weeks the volksgrenadiers had infiltrated back into and created strongpoints throughout the village. While this battle was no less a struggle than the earlier battle, the entrenched Germans inside the village could not stave off the unrelenting American attack and the village of Kesternich fell into American hands.

The 78th Division's plan of operations was quite ambitious. All three RCTs were to be engaged with support from the 5th Armored Division's Combat Command A. To the south, the 310th was assigned the objectives of Am Gericht, Konzen and Imgenbroich. To the north, the 309th was to hold in place as the initial operations kicked off, later they would be called on to sweep up the Monschau Corridor, taking Strauch, Steckenborn, Hechelscheid, Woffelsbach, Silberscheidt, Kommerscheidt and Harscheidt on their way to their final objectives of Schmidt and the Schwammenauel Dam. The 311th RCT was given the center, assisting the 5th Armored's CCA with their objective at Eicherscheid as well as taking their own objectives of Huppenbroich and Kesternich. The 2nd Battalion of the 311th was to take Kesternich.

The high ridge at Kesternich dictated that the town could not be fully enveloped in an attack from the west. As with the earlier attack, operations had to go straight down the center of the village. The Germans were prepared to block that route. As the GIs jumped off in the darkness, a slight snow shower helped to conceal their movement. Still, the Americans did not achieve surprise and as they met the initial German defenses mid-way into the village, they were assailed by automatic weapons fire and panzerfaust fire directed into the trees to create tree bursts.

Tank support proved problematic as the attached company of the 736th Tank Battalion had not seen combat action previously. One tank platoon was attached to Company E, and one to Company F, which also had a section of tank destroyers. The third tank platoon and the other section of tank destroyers acted as a battalion reserve. One platoon leader later remarked that timid tank support was worse than none at all. Squad leaders in highly exposed positions on the back of tanks became a common sight as they attempted to guide the armor forward into firing positions.

With ample time to develop their defense, the Volksgrenadiers had emplaced machine gun positions in houses and in the rubble behind mine fields and wire. Each of these strong points became an exercise in and of itself in order to advance. It took actions like those of squad leader Jonah Edward Kelley, who singlehandedly destroyed several machine-gun emplacements before being killed, to push the attack. At the end of the first day, the battalion had only advanced a couple of hundred yards into the rubble.

Bitter house-to-house and rubble pile to rubble pile continued on the second day. The advance made about as much gain as during the first day. However, this left the German defenders with a mere toehold on the village's eastern side.

On the third day, the 2nd Battalion finally captured the village by noon. The Americans now held a key position along the Kesternich ridge; in the first week of December, they had captured the Brandenburg-Bergstein ridge. They now held the two ridgelines on either side of the Schmidt ridge. This opened the way for the 309th RCT in conjunction with portions of the 310th RCT to push down that ridgeline to capture the Schwammenauel Dam.

At this point, on 2 February 1945, the 78th Division was returned to the command of the First Army and V Corps. Progress wasn't as speedy as desired by the commanders, and through a series of directives from General Huebner, Commander of V Corps, the 78th Division reorganized their attack. In the end, these adjustments proved to add difficulty to the operation.

== Notable Participants ==
- S/Sgt. Jonah Edward Kelley - Awarded the Medal of Honor posthumously for his service at Kesternich. Street named after him in Camp Grohn.
- Lt. Col. Richard W. Keyes - CO of 2nd Battalion, 311th Infantry, earned Distinguished Service Cross 30 January 1945 at Kesternich.
- 1Lt. Andrew G. Nufer Jr - 3rd Platoon leader, Company F, 2nd Battalion, 311th Infantry, earned Distinguished Service Cross 30 January 1945 at Kesternich.
- S/Sgt. Lynn Q. Ingersoll - Company E, 2nd Battalion, 309th Infantry, earned Combat Infantry Badge & Purple Heart, 13 December 1944, in the First Battle of Kesternich.
- Pfc. Keith B. Fox - Received the Silver Star. Street named after him in Camp Grohn.
- Pfc. David H. Parker - Received the Bronze Star. Street named after him in Camp Grohn. David H. Parker Square named after him in Cohasset, MA (his home town).

== See also ==
- Kesternich from the German Wikipedia
- 272nd Volksgrenadier Division (Wehrmacht)
- 78th Training Division

== Sources ==
- Astor, Gerald. The Bloody Forest: Battle for the Huertgen: September 1944-January 1945, Presidio Press, Novato, CA, 2000.
- Barner, Captain John H., “Advanced Infantry Officers Course 1949-1950, Operations of the2d Battalion, 311th Infantry (78th Infantry Division) in the Attack on Kesternich, Germany, 30 January – 1 February 1945 (Rhineland Campaign). (Personal Experience of a Company Commander, Cannon Company Which Supported This Action).”
- Currey, Cecil B. Follow Me and Die: the Destruction of an American Division in World War II, (Stein and Day, New York, NY, 1984.
- Gunkel, Otto, translation by Merle Hill, “New setup of the 272 VGD at Doberitz – Action in the Eifel.” (Unpublished memoir, December 1986)
- Kemman, Lawrence H. LTC, "Operations of the 2nd Battalion, 309th Infantry, the 2nd Battalion, 310th Infantry, 78th Infantry Division, in the Attack on Kesternich, Germany, 14-15 December 1944" (Rhineland Campaign)*

Miller, Edward G., A Dark and Bloody Ground: The Hürtgen Forest and the Roer River Dams, 1944 - 1945. (College Station, TX: Texas A & M University Press, 1995)

MacKnight, George Thomas. The First Battle for Kesternich (Casemate Publishers, 2023).

Miller, Edward G., “Desperate Hours at Kesternich,” World War II, Volume II, Number 4, November 1996, Cowles Enthusiast Media, History Group, Leesburg, Va.

- Miller, Edward G., Nothing Less Than Full Victory. (Annapolis, MD: US Naval Institute Press, 2007)
- McDonald, Charles B., The Siegfried Line Campaign. Washington, D.C.: U.S. Army Center of Military History, 1984.
- Nash, Douglas E., Victory Was Beyond Their Grasp: With the 272nd Volks-Grenadier Division from the Hurtgen Forest to the Heart of the Reich. Bedford, PA: Aberjona Press, 2008)
- Reineke, Johann, “Defense in Kesternich, Autumn and Winter 1944 – Excerpts from a War Diary.” (Unpublished memoir. Bremerhaven, 1954) and Loehrer, Norbert and Petrzik, Marlis, Katharina and Schattenberg, Horst, ed., translated by Tom MacKnight, Castriniacum, Kasternich, Kesternich, “OSS HEMET”. (Kesternich, Germany, The Association for the Local History of Kesternich, 1996)
- Schmidt, Gunther, “The 272 Volksgrenadier Division In Action In The Eifel 1944/45,” translation by Ron van Rijt, The Flash, January 2000, The 78th (Lighting) Division Veterans Association, Pittsburgh, PA.
- Whiting, Charles. The Battle of Hurtgen Forest, Spellmount Ltd., Kent, England, 1989. ISBN 1-86227-094-5.
