= 272nd Division =

272nd Division may refer to:

- 272nd Infantry Division, Wehrmacht, Germany, December 1943–September 1944
- 272nd Volksgrenadier Division, Wehrmacht, Germany, September 1944–April 1945
- 272nd Rifle Division, Soviet Union

== See also ==
- List of military divisions by number
