= 272nd Volksgrenadier Division =

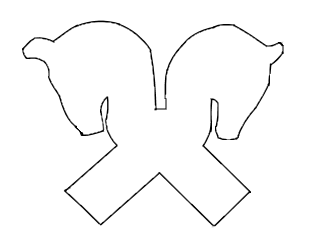
- 272. Volksgrenadier Division Vehicle Insignia
- Active: 17 September 1944 - 14 April 1945
- Disbanded: April 1945
- Country: Nazi Germany
- Branch: Army
- Type: Infantry
- Size: Division, 10,000 men total
- Engagements: Battle of the Huertgen Forest; Hubertus Heights; Bergstein; Castle Hill (Hill 400); Simmerath; Second Battle of Schmidt; The Roer River Dams; Battle of Kesternich; Retreat to the Rhine; Remagen; Battle of the Ruhr Pocket

The 272nd Volksgrenadier Division, was a German Army Volksgrenadier division formed following the defeats of the Normandy Campaign in 1944. Composed of men taken from existing Heer (army) units and airmen and sailors retasked to infantry duties, the division fought on the retreating Western Front until it was largely encircled in the Ruhr Pocket in April 1945.

== Unit history ==
The 272nd Volksgrenadier Division was formed on 17 September 1944 at the Döberitz Training Area in Germany by combining the then-forming 575th Volksgrenadier Division with the remnants of the veteran 272nd Infantry Division, which had barely managed to escape from the Allied offensives following the Normandy landings.

Organized using the new Volksgrenadier division structure designed in August 1944, the division consisted of three two-battalion infantry regiments, a four-battalion artillery regiment, a combat engineer battalion, an antitank battalion, a signals battalion, a fusilier company, and a logistics regiment. At its full table of organization strength it fielded 10,000 men.

After six weeks of reorganization and training, the division was shipped to the Western Front in early November 1944, and fought in the Battle of the Huertgen Forest, along the Roer River, and then the retreat to the Rhine. It eventually was forced to capitulate in April 1945 when it was encircled in what became known as the Battle of the Ruhr Pocket, though a single regiment escaped but was later forced to surrender at the Harz "Fortress". Its most singular engagement was during the Battle of Kesternich from 13 to 18 December 1944, when it managed to encircle and destroy an entire battalion from the 310th Infantry Regiment of the U.S. 78th Infantry Division, capturing over 300 men and officers.

Though, like other Volksgrenadier divisions, the 272nd's ranks were filled with a large proportion of former Luftwaffe (Air Force) and Kriegsmarine (Navy) personnel (up to 50% by some estimates), the division performed creditably, due in part to the large number of veteran commanders and non-commissioned officers it retained from the old 272nd Infantry Division, which itself was built on the foundation of the disbanded 216th Infantry Division.

Volksgrenadier divisions had lower manpower at 10,000 men vs. the older division structure of 16,000 men and the reliance on large numbers defensive weapons including the new Sturmgewehr 44 ("assault rifle model 1944"), a radical departure from the bolt action Mauser model 98 rifle.

Combining reliance on this new weapons technology, the volksgrenadier divisions were supposed to be the new model division representing the will of the German people ("das Volk"), and their willingness to fight to the bitter end. Though a few volksgrenadier divisions lived up to this ideal, most failed to meet expectations and by the war's end, the term volksgrenadier came to be viewed by the Allies as meaning a second-rate, bottom-of-the-barrel type of soldier.

== Divisional commanders ==
- Oberst (Colonel) Georg Koßmala (30 September - 13 December 1944)
- Generalmajor (Brigadier General) Eugen König (13 December 1944 - 14 April 1945)

== Order of battle ==
Order of Battle, October 1944:

- Staff Company
- Volks-Grenadier Regiment 980
- Volks-Grenadier Regiment 981
- Volks-Grenadier Regiment 982
- Artillery Regiment 272
- Pioneer (Combat Engineer) Battalion 272
- Antitank Battalion 272
- Signal Battalion 272
- Fusilier Company 272
- Logistics Regiment 272
- Field Replacement Battalion 272

== Bibliography ==
- Tessin, Georg: Verbände und Truppen der deutschen Wehrmacht und Waffen-SS 1939-1945, Vol. 8. (Osnabrūck: Biblio Verlag, 1979)]
- Jenner, Martin: Die niedersächsiche 216./272. Infanterie-Division 1939–1945. (Nauheim: Podzun-Pallas Verlag, 1964)
- The Siegfried Line Campaign McDonald, Charles B., . (Washington, D.C.: U.S. Army Center of Military History, 1984)
- Miller, Edward: A Dark and Bloody Ground: The Hürtgen Forest and the Roer River Dams, 1944 - 1945. (College Station, TX: Texas A & M University Press, 1995)]
- Nash, Douglas: Victory was Beyond Their Grasp: with the 272nd Volks-Grenadier Division from the Hürtgen Forest to the Heart of the Reich. (Bedford: The Aberjona Press, 2008)]
- Miller, Edward G., “Desperate Hours at Kesternich,” World War II, Volume II, Number 4, November 1996, Cowles Enthusiast Media, History Group, Leesburg, VA]
- McDonald, Charles B., The Battle of the Huertgen Forest (Philadelphia: University of Pennsylvania Press, 1963)
- Miller, Edward G., Nothing Less Than Full Victory (US Naval Institute Press, 2007)
