= USNS Sgt. Jonah E. Kelley =

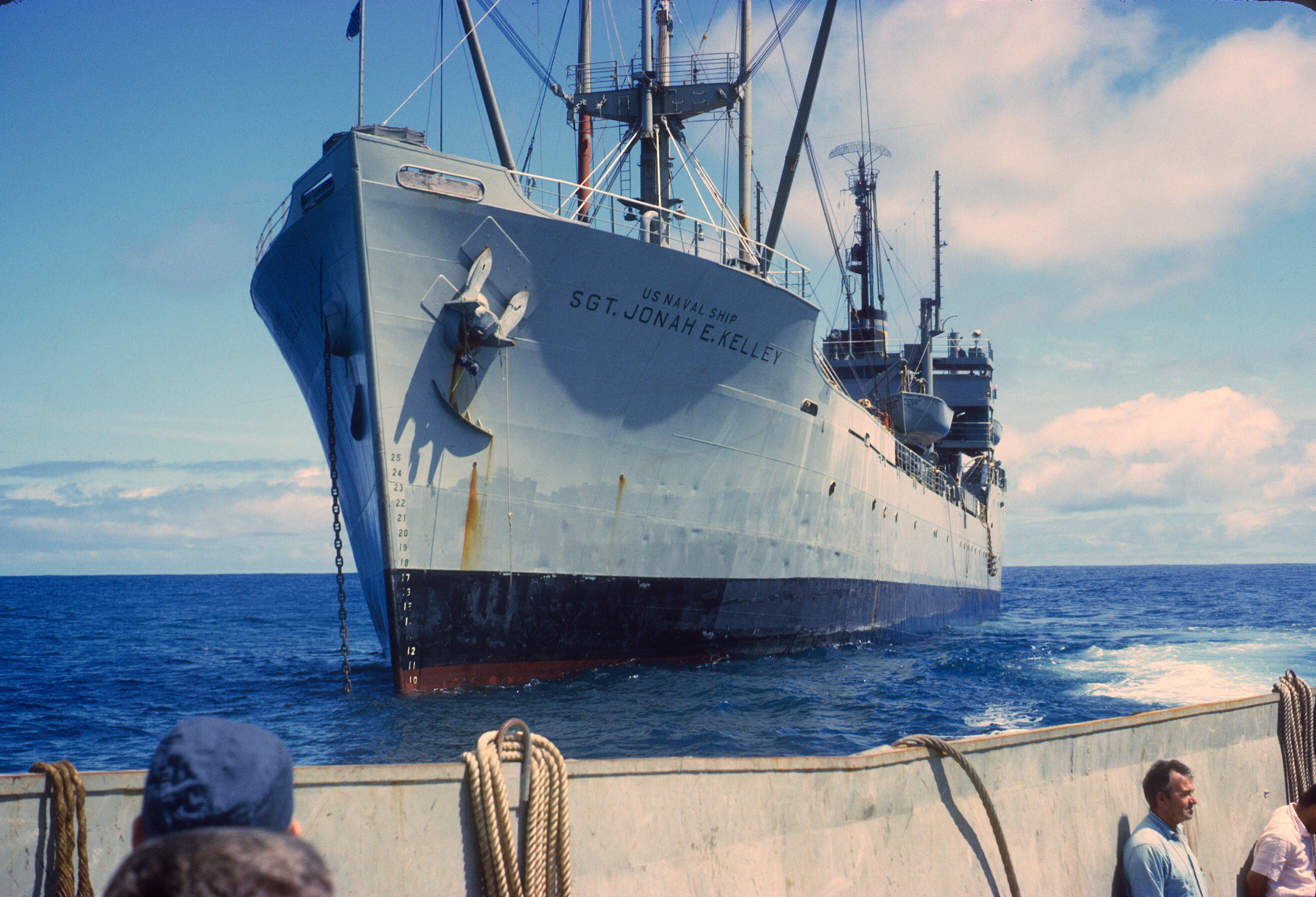
- USNS Sgt. Jonah E. Kelley

History

United States
- Name: USNS Sgt. Jonah E. Kelley
- Namesake: Jonah Edward Kelley
- Owner: United States Navy
- Operator: Military Sealift Command
- Builder: Southeastern Shipbuilding Corporation
- Laid down: 29 January 1945
- Launched: 17 March 1945
- In service: 1949
- Out of service: 1969
- Fate: Sold for scrap 1972

General characteristics
- Class & type: Jonah E. Kelley
- Displacement: 6,090 tons (full)
- Length: 338 ft 9 in (103.25 m)
- Beam: 50 ft 4 in (15.34 m)
- Draft: 17 ft 7 in (5.36 m)
- Speed: 11.5 knots
- Complement: 48; 101, later 81 passengers

USNS Sgt. Jonah E. Kelley (T-APC-116), was originally built as Link Splice under a United States Maritime Commission contract (MC hull 2489) and was laid down on 29 January 1945 by the Southeastern Shipbuilding Corporation in Savannah, Georgia. She was launched on 17 March 1945, sponsored by Mrs. L. W. Grothaus and delivered to the War Shipping Administration for operation by the Moore McCormack Lines on 28 August 1945.

Less than a year later, Link Splice was returned to the WSA and on 20 June 1946, she was transferred to the Army for use as a coastal cargo ship. Renamed USAT Sgt. Jonah E. Kelley on 31 October 1947, the ship served the Army Transportation Service as an XAKc until the spring of 1948. Conversion followed; and during her last year of Army service, she carried passengers and cargo.

In October 1949, the Military Sea Transportation Service (MSTS) was established. Five months later, the converted C1-MK-AV1 was transferred to the US Navy for MSTS use and placed in service as USNS Sgt. Jonah E. Kelley (T-APC-116). Assigned to North Atlantic operations, for almost a decade, she carried passengers and limited cargo from east coast ports, primarily New York, to northern bases, primarily Argentia and St. John's, Newfoundland. In November 1959, her passenger service was discontinued; and she commenced cargo runs between the same ports which, with few interruptions, she continued for another 10 years. Cargo handling equipment was composed of one 30 ton and two 10 ton booms. The ship could be quickly converted to include passengers with capacity for 81 troops in 21 cabins.

In November 1969, Sgt. Jonah E. Kelley was replaced by USNS Mirfak (T-AK-271); and, on the 24th, she returned to New York for the last time. She was then placed out of service and inactivation was begun. In late December, she was shifted to Norfolk; and, on the 22d, she was transferred to the Maritime Administration for berthing in the James River unit of the National Defense Reserve Fleet. On 3 October 1972 the ship was sold for scrapping to Union Minerals and Alloys Corporation for $25,000. On 6 December the ship was delivered to the company for scrapping.
