= Eugen König =

- Born: 19 September 1896
- Died: 8 April 1985 (aged 88)
- Military career
- Allegiance: Nazi Germany
- Branch: Army
- Rank: Generalleutnant
- Commands: 91st Infantry Division; 272nd Volksgrenadier Division
- Conflicts: World War II
- Awards: Knight's Cross of the Iron Cross with Oak Leaves

Eugen König (19 September 1896 – 8 April 1985) was a German general in the Wehrmacht of Nazi Germany during World War II. He was a recipient of the Knight's Cross of the Iron Cross with Oak Leaves.

== Awards and decorations ==
- Iron Cross (1914) 2nd Class (30 November 1916) 1st Class (9 July 1920)
- Clasp to the Iron Cross (1939) 2nd Class (19 June 1940) & 1st Class (9 September 1940)
- Knight's Cross of the Iron Cross with Oak Leaves
  - Knight's Cross on 1 August 1942 as Major and commander of II./Infanterie-Regiment 352
  - 318th Oak Leaves on 4 November 1943 as Oberst and commander of Grenadier-Regiment 451

Military offices
Preceded by Generalmajor Bernhard Klosterkemper	Commander of 91. Luftlande-Infanterie-Division; 10 June 1944 - 10 August 1944	Succeeded by Renamed 344. Infanterie-Division
Preceded by Oberst Georg Koßmala	Commander of 272. Volksgrenadier-Division; 13 December 1944 - 14 April 1945	Succeeded by None
