= Jonah Edward Kelley =

American soldier of World War II

- Born: April 13, 1923; Rada, West Virginia
- Died: January 31, 1945 (aged 21); Kesternich, Germany
- Burial place: 1945-1948 Netherlands American Cemetery; 1948 moved to Queens Point Cemetery, Keyser, WV
- Military career
- Allegiance: United States of America
- Branch: United States Army
- Service years: 1943–1945
- Rank: Staff Sergeant
- Nicknames: "Eddie" (family) "Ed" (friends) "Jolting Jonah" (boot camp) "Combat Kelley" (during combat)
- Units: Company E, 311th Infantry Regiment, 78th Infantry Division
- Conflicts: World War II • Battle of Hürtgen Forest • Battle of Kesternich †
- Awards: Medal of Honor; Bronze Star; Purple Heart (2)

Jonah Edward "Eddie" Kelley (April 13, 1923 – January 31, 1945) was a United States Army soldier who received the United States military's highest decoration, the Medal of Honor, for his actions in World War II.

== Biography ==
Kelley was born in Rada, West Virginia, on April 13, 1923, and grew up in nearby Keyser. He was the middle child and only son of Jonah and Rebecca Kelley; his two sisters were Beulah and Georgianna. A sports enthusiast, Kelley played football and basketball while attending Keyser High School and also participated in Boy Scouts and activities through his church, Grace United Methodist. After graduating from high school, he entered Potomac State College where he played on the football team until being drafted into the U.S. Army in 1943.

Sent to Germany, Kelley served as a staff sergeant with the 311th Infantry Regiment of the 78th Infantry Division. The division had been fighting for weeks to take the village of Kesternich, southeast of Aachen, because occupation of the village would also give control of the nearby Roer River dams.

During intense house-to-house fighting on January 30, 1945, Kelley led a squad in repeated assaults on German-held buildings. Although he received two wounds, one of which disabled his left hand, he did not withdraw to seek medical attention but continued to lead his men. The next morning, he single-handedly sought out and killed a German gunner who was preventing his squad's advance before being killed while assaulting a second German position. For these actions, he was posthumously awarded the Medal of Honor eight months later, on September 10, 1945.

Aged 21 at his death, Kelley was initially buried in Margraten, Netherlands. On March 26, 1946, his mother, Rebecca Kelley, wrote a letter to the Quartermaster's General Office, the War Department, requesting that they bring her son Eddie home to be properly buried. After three years of frustrating correspondence with the American Graves Registration division, the Kelley family finally received permission to repatriate Ed's body through the Philadelphia Quartermaster Depot. In December 1948 his remains were returned to the U.S. and interred at Queens Point Cemetery in his hometown of Keyser.

== Honors ==
Several structures have been named in Kelley's honor. Located in the suburb of Moehringen in the southeast corner of Stuttgart, Germany, is a former German military facility that was renamed Kelley Barracks and is today the garrison for Africa Command. The U.S. Army named a transport ship USAT Sgt. Jonah E. Kelley in 1947. When the ship was transferred to the United States Navy in 1950, it became the USNS Sgt. Jonah E. Kelley (T-APC-116). In 2006, legislation introduced to the West Virginia House of Delegates by Representatives Robert Schadler, Allen V. Evans, and Ruth Rowan, all of Mineral County, named a bridge on West Virginia Route 46 in Keyser in honor of Kelley. Construction on the "Staff Sergeant Jonah Edward Kelley Bridge" over New Creek began in November 2006. An Army Reserve facility at Fort Dix is named the SSG Jonah Kelley Center.

The J. Edward Kelley Society administers two awards available to people associated with Kelley's alma mater, Keyser High School. The Ed Kelley Award, established the year after Kelley's death and awarded annually ever since, is a scholarship available to students who played varsity basketball or football at the school for at least two years. The Legion of Honor, established in 1984, recognizes graduates who distinguished themselves in their careers and others who have supported the school in some way.

== Medal of Honor citation ==
Kelley's official Medal of Honor citation reads:

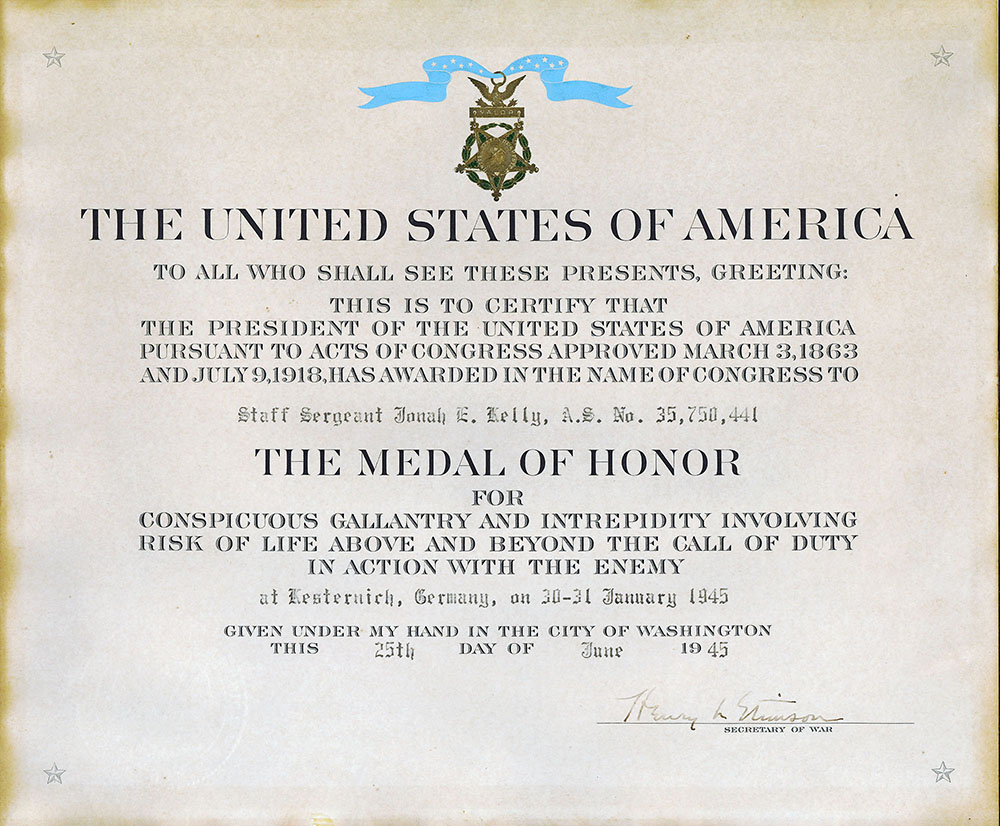
Jonah Edward Kelley MOH Citation

In charge of the leading squad of Company E, he heroically spearheaded the attack in furious house-to-house fighting. Early on 30 January, he led his men through intense mortar and small arms fire in repeated assaults on barricaded houses. Although twice wounded, once when struck in the back, the second time when a mortar shell fragment passed through his left hand and rendered it practically useless, he refused to withdraw and continued to lead his squad after hasty dressings had been applied. His serious wounds forced him to fire his rifle with 1 hand, resting it on rubble or over his left forearm. To blast his way forward with hand grenades, he set aside his rifle to pull the pins with his teeth while grasping the missiles with his good hand. Despite these handicaps, he created tremendous havoc in the enemy ranks. He rushed l house, killing 3 of the enemy and clearing the way for his squad to advance. On approaching the next house, he was fired upon from an upstairs window. He killed the sniper with a single shot and similarly accounted for another enemy soldier who ran from the cellar of the house. As darkness came, he assigned his men to defensive positions, never leaving them to seek medical attention. At dawn the next day, the squad resumed the attack, advancing to a point where heavy automatic and small arms fire stalled them. Despite his wounds, S/Sgt. Kelley moved out alone, located an enemy gunner dug in under a haystack and killed him with rifle fire. He returned to his men and found that a German machinegun, from a well-protected position in a neighboring house, still held up the advance. Ordering the squad to remain in comparatively safe positions, he valiantly dashed into the open and attacked the position single-handedly through a hail of bullets. He was hit several times and fell to his knees when within 25 yards of his objective; but he summoned his waning strength and emptied his rifle into the machinegun nest, silencing the weapon before he died. The superb courage, aggressiveness, and utter disregard for his own safety displayed by S/Sgt. Kelley inspired the men he led and enabled them to penetrate the last line of defense held by the enemy in the village of Kesternich.

== Awards and decorations ==
Staff Sergeant Jonah Edward Kelley's decorations and medals are the following:

Badge	Combat Infantryman Badge		
1st row	Medal of Honor		
2nd row	Bronze Star Medal	Purple Heart with oak leaf cluster	Army Good Conduct Medal
3rd row	American Campaign Medal	European–African–Middle Eastern Campaign Medal with one campaign star	World War II Victory Medal
Unit awards	Presidential Unit Citation		

== See also ==
- List of Medal of Honor recipients for World War II
