= 78th Training Division =

78th Infantry Division
- 78th Infantry Division shoulder sleeve insignia
- Active: 5 August 1917–9 July 1919 (National Army); 24 June 1921–22 May 1946 (Organized Reserves); 1 November 1946–1 May 1959 (Army Reserve); 1 May 1959–present (78th Training Div.)
- Country: United States of America
- Branch: United States Army Reserve
- Type: Infantry
- Size: Division
- Part of: 84th Training Command
- Nickname: "Lightning" (special designation)
- Motto: Audaciter (Boldly)
- Engagements: World War I; St. Mihiel; Meuse-Argonne; Lorraine 1918; World War II; Rhineland; Ardennes-Alsace; Central Europe

Commanders
- Current commander: BG Andrew F. Scarcella
- Command Sergeant Major: CSM Jodi R. Renner
- Notable commanders: Hugh L. Scott; Norman Schwarzkopf Sr.; Edwin P. Parker Jr.; Otho B. Rosenbaum

Insignia
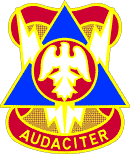
- Distinctive unit insignia

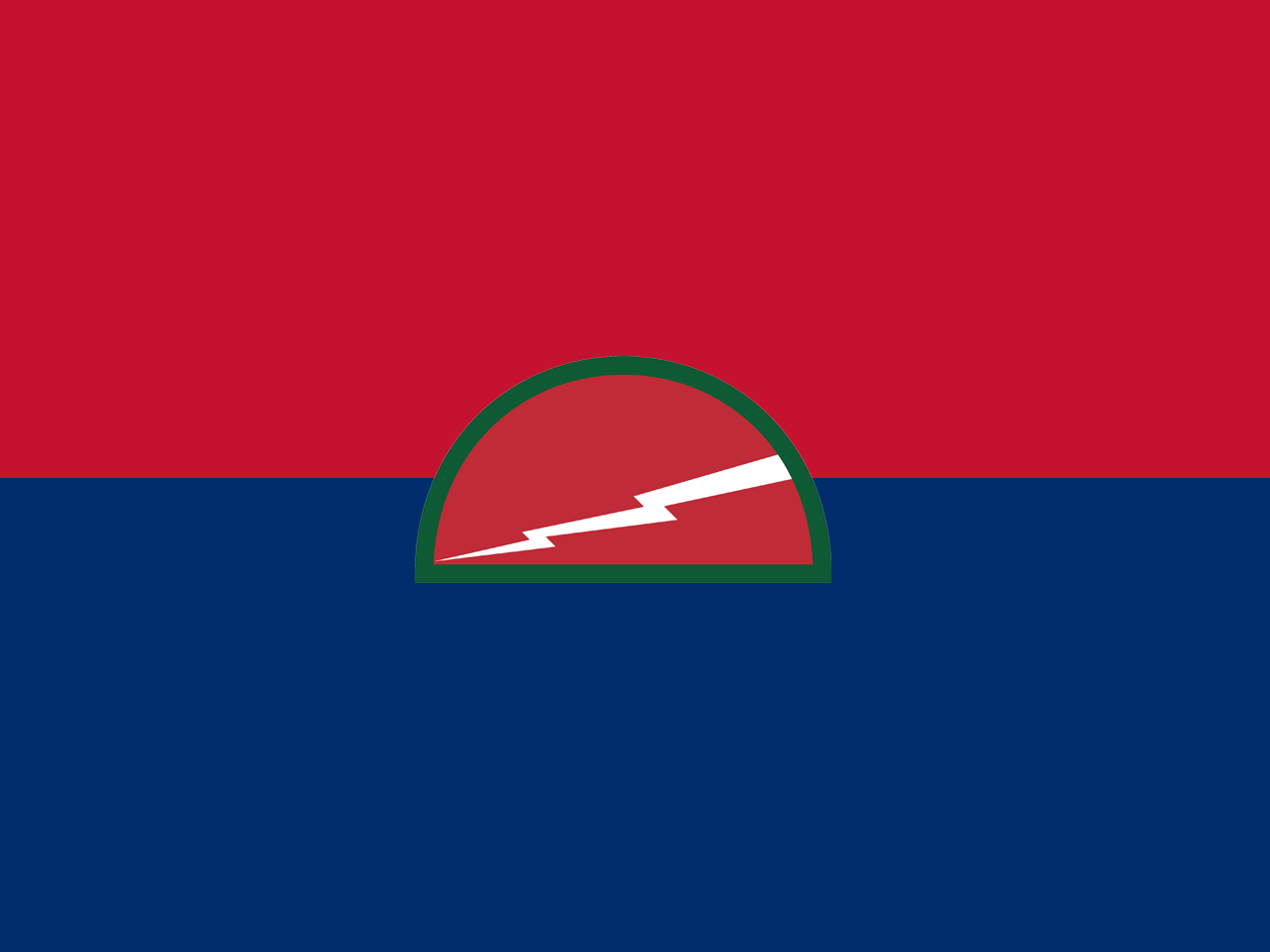
- Flag of the United States Army 78th Training Division

The 78th Training Division (Operations) ("Lightning") is a unit of the United States Army which served in World War I and World War II as the 78th Infantry Division, and currently trains and evaluates units of the United States Army Reserve for deployment.

== History ==
=== World War I ===
The 78th Division of the United States Army was constituted on 5 August 1917. The division was originally allocated to New York and northern Pennsylvania in the National Army recruiting plan. The division consisted of four infantry regiments: the 309th, 310th, 311th and 312th; and three artillery regiments: the 307th, 308th and 309th.

On 23 August 1917 Major-General Chase W. Kennedy took command at Camp Dix, New Jersey. During the last week in August organizing the division began from a cadre of officers and men of the Regular Army, and from Organized Reserve Corps and National Army officers of the First Officers Training Camp at Madison Barracks. From September 5-10, the initial draft of 2,000 selective service men arrived at Camp Dix. During September 17,200 additional men arrive; systematic training begins. On October 31, the division numbered about 16,000. By November 19-24, the last drafts of 1917 furnished the camp with 5,000 additional personnel. By November 30, transfers had reduced it to less than half the authorized strength. By March 31, 1918, the division was only 10,000 strong, due to large transfers which exceed fresh drafts and other arrivals. During April and May 1918 transfers, and drafts from New England, New York, New Jersey, and Illinois, completed the division. After several more months of training, the division was transported to France in May and June 1918.

Immediately after arrival in France, in the first half of June 1918, the division (less artillery) detrained at Marquise and moves to the Lumbres Training Area where it was affiliated with the British 34th Division. From June 8-August 21, the 78th Division was under the administrative control of the II Corps. In France, during the summer and fall of 1918, it was the "point of the wedge" of the final offensive which knocked out Germany. The 78th was in three major campaigns during World War I – Meuse-Argonne, St. Mihiel, and Lorraine. Two soldiers of the division won the Medal of Honor. The division was inactivated in June 1919 and demobilized on 9 July 1919 at Camp Dix, New Jersey.

- Major Operations: Meuse-Argonne, St. Mihiel.
- Roll of Honor:
  - Killed in Action: 1,169
  - Wounded in Action: 5,975
  - Total: 7,144
- Commanders: Maj. Gen. Kennedy; Brig. Gen. John S. Mallory (28 November 1917); Brig. Gen. James T. Dean (28 December 1917); Maj. Gen. Hugh L. Scott (2 January 1918); Brig. Gen. James T. Dean (16 March 1918); Maj. Gen. James H. McRae (20 April 1918).

==== Order of battle ====
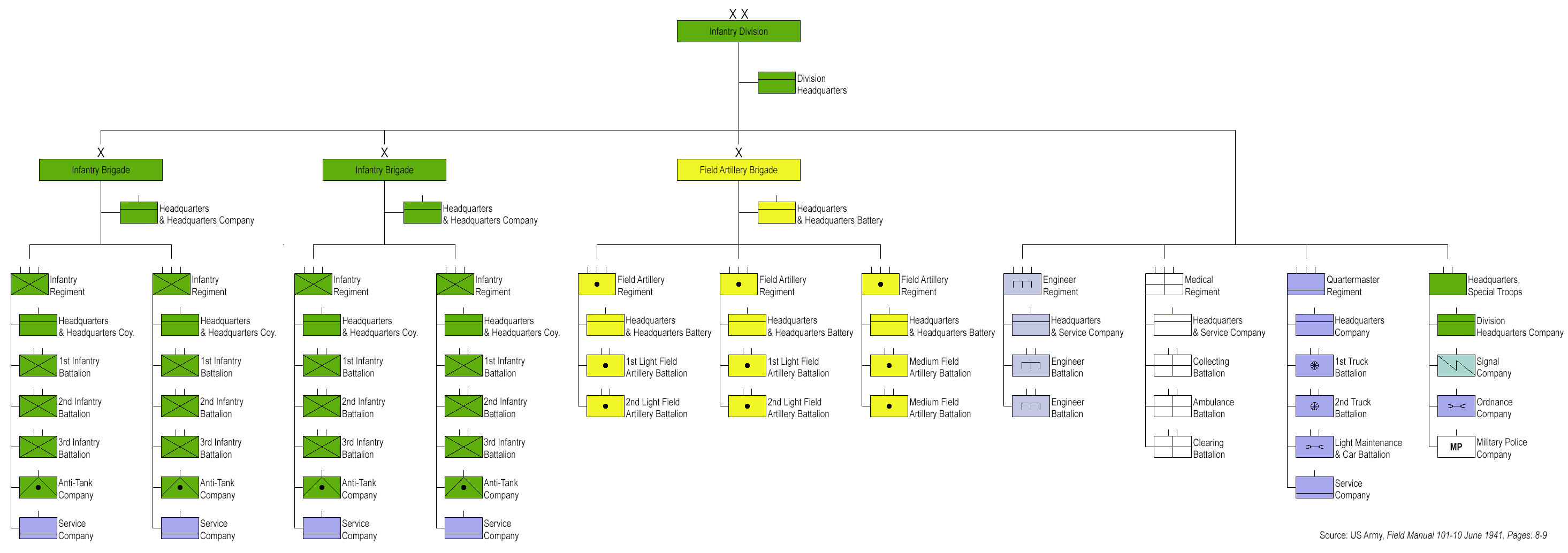
1918 "Square" US Infantry Division. On the far left can be seen two Brigades of two Regiments each

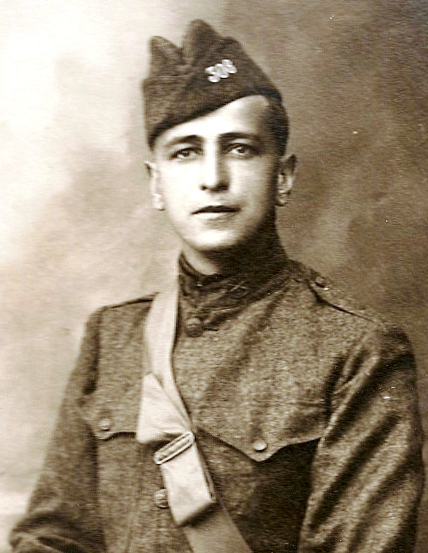
Private James W. Brown of the United States Army's 78th Infantry Division. He was part of the 308 Supply Company Field Artillery during World War I. The photo was taken somewhere in France during his tour in the war.

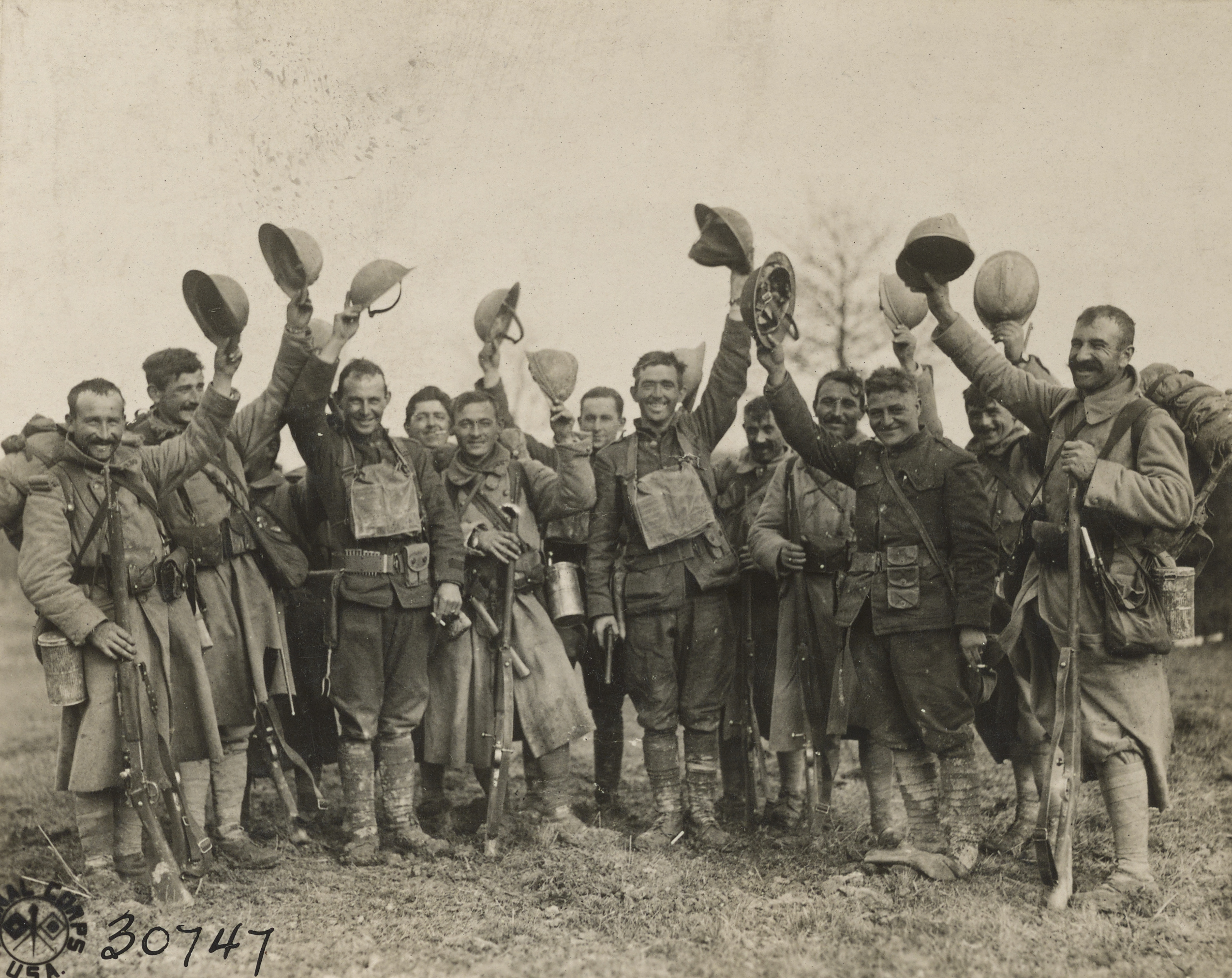
American and French soldiers at the front. The Americans (who during the war were given the nickname of doughboys) are Private John J. Burke, Corporal Victor E. Cowley and Private J. R. Keith, and are all from the 1st Battalion, 312th Infantry Regiment, 78th Division, while the French are from the 320th Regiment. The picture was taken in Boult-aux-Bois, Ardennes, France, sometime in 1918.

- Headquarters, 78th Division
- 155th Infantry Brigade
  - 309th Infantry Regiment
  - 310th Infantry Regiment
  - 308th Machine Gun Battalion
- 156th Infantry Brigade
  - 311th Infantry Regiment
  - 312th Infantry Regiment
  - 309th Machine Gun Battalion
- 153rd Field Artillery Brigade
  - 307th Field Artillery Regiment (75 mm)
  - 308th Field Artillery Regiment (75 mm)
  - 309th Field Artillery Regiment (155 mm)
  - 303rd Trench Mortar Battery
- 307th Machine Gun Battalion
- 303rd Engineer Regiment
- 303rd Field Signal Battalion
- Headquarters Troop, 78th Division
- 303rd Train Headquarters and Military Police
  - 303rd Ammunition Train
  - 303rd Supply Train
  - 303rd Engineer Train
    - 309th-312th Ambulance Companies and Field Hospitals
    - 303rd Sanitary Train

=== Interwar period ===
The division was reconstituted in the Organized Reserve on 24 June 1921, allotted to the Second Corps Area, and assigned to the XII Corps with the state of New Jersey as its home area. The division headquarters was organized on 1 July 1921 at 39 Whitehall Street in Manhattan, but relocated on 26 March 1924 to the Globe Indemnity Building, Washington Place, Newark, New Jersey. The headquarters was relocated on 25 July 1936 to the Federal Building, 1180 Raymond Boulevard in Newark and remained there until activated for World War II. Like the 77th Division, the initial formation of the “Lightning Division” was speeded up by the enrollment of many officers who were World War I veterans of the division. To maintain communications with the officers of the division, the division staff published a newsletter, the “78th Division Gazette.” The newsletter informed the division’s members of such things as when and where the inactive training sessions were to be held, what the division’s summer training quotas were, where the camps were to be held, and which units would be assigned to help conduct the Citizens Military Training Camps (CMTC). The designated mobilization and training station for the division was Camp Dix, the location where much of the 78th’s training activities occurred in the interwar years. The division headquarters often conducted its summer training there, and on a number of occasions, participated in CPXs at Camp Dix as well. The 78th Division headquarters also occasionally trained with the staffs of the 1st Division or the 1st Infantry Brigade at Camp Dix. In 1924, the division officers with assistance from Colonel Edward A. Shuttleworth, the division chief of staff, established Camp Silzer at Sea Girt, New Jersey, for the purposes of providing a training area for the division. Camp Silzer was used some summers by the division staff for command post exercises and frequently for “contact camps” by subordinate units. For the 1937 camp at Camp Dix, the division staff and subordinate units planned and conducted an unusual division night attack exercise in coordination with the 303rd Chemical Regiment and the 40th Engineer Battalion (Camouflage). As of 1937, the division was commanded by Brigadier General Perry L. Miles.

The subordinate infantry regiments of the division held their summer training primarily with the units of the 1st Infantry Brigade. Other units, such as the special troops, artillery, engineers, aviation, medical, and quartermaster, usually trained at various posts in the Second and Third Corps Areas also with other units of the 1st Division. For example, the division’s artillery units trained with the 7th Field Artillery at Pine Camp, New York; the 303rd Engineer Regiment usually trained with the 1st Engineer Regiment at Fort DuPont, Delaware; the 303rd Medical Regiment trained with the 1st Medical Regiment at Carlisle Barracks, Pennsylvania; and the 303rd Observation Squadron trained with the 5th Observation Squadron at Mitchel Field, New York. In addition to the unit training camps, the infantry regiments of the division rotated responsibility for conducting the infantry CMTC held at Camp Dix each year. On a number of occasions, the division participated in Second Corps Area or First Army command post exercises in conjunction with other Regular Army, National Guard, and Organized Reserve units. These training events gave division staff officers’ opportunities to practice the roles they would be expected to perform in the event the division was mobilized. Unlike the Regular Army and National Guard units in the First Corps Area, the 78th Division did not participate in the Second Corps Area maneuvers and the First Army maneuvers of 1935, 1939, and 1940 as an organized unit due to lack of enlisted personnel and equipment. Instead, the officers and a few enlisted reservists were assigned to Regular Army and National Guard units to fill vacant slots and bring the units up to war strength for the exercises. Additionally, some were assigned duties as umpires or as support personnel.

Division organization in 1939:

- Headquarters (Newark, NJ)
- Headquarters, Special Troops (Newark, NJ)
  - Headquarters Company (Newark, NJ)
  - 78th Military Police Company (Newark, NJ)
  - 78th Signal Company (Newark, NJ)
  - 303rd Ordnance Company (Medium) (Newark, NJ)
  - 78th Tank Company (Light) (Newark, NJ)
- 155th Infantry Brigade (Englewood, NJ)
  - 309th Infantry Regiment (Camden, NJ)
  - 310th Infantry Regiment (Englewood, NJ)
- 156th Infantry Brigade (Newark, NJ)
  - 311th Infantry Regiment (Elizabeth, NJ)
  - 312th Infantry Regiment (Newark, NJ)
- 153rd Field Artillery Brigade (Englewood, NJ)
  - 307th Field Artillery Regiment (75 mm) (Trenton, NJ)
  - 308th Field Artillery Regiment (75 mm) (Hoboken, NJ)
  - 309th Field Artillery Regiment (155 mm) (Brooklyn, NY)
  - 303rd Ammunition Train (Trenton, NJ)
- 303rd Engineer Regiment (Paterson, NJ)
- 303rd Medical Regiment (Newark, NJ)
- 403rd Quartermaster Regiment (Newark, NJ)

=== World War II ===
- Called into federal service: 15 August 1942.
- Overseas: 14 October 1944.
- Campaigns: Rhineland, Ardennes-Alsace, Central Europe.
- Days of combat: 125.
- Distinguished Unit Citations: 4.
- Commanders: Maj. Gen. Edwin P. Parker Jr. (August 1942 – November 1945), Maj. Gen. Ray W. Barker (January 1946 to inactivation).
- Inactivated: 22 May 1946 in Europe.

==== Mobilization ====
Before Organized Reserve infantry divisions were ordered into active military service, they were reorganized on paper as "triangular" divisions under the 1940 tables of organization. The headquarters companies of the two infantry brigades were consolidated into the division's cavalry reconnaissance troop, and one infantry regiment was removed by inactivation. The field artillery brigade headquarters and headquarters battery became the headquarters and headquarters battery of the division artillery. Its three field artillery regiments were reorganized into four battalions; one battalion was taken from each of the two 75 mm gun regiments to form two 105 mm howitzer battalions, the brigade's ammunition train was reorganized as the third 105 mm howitzer battalion, and the 155 mm howitzer battalion was formed from the 155 mm howitzer regiment. The engineer, medical, and quartermaster regiments were reorganized into battalions. In 1942, divisional quartermaster battalions were split into ordnance light maintenance companies and quartermaster companies, and the division's headquarters and military police company, which had previously been a combined unit, was split.

The 78th Infantry Division was reorganized effective 20 February 1942, and was ordered into active military service on 15 August 1942 and reorganized at Camp Butner, North Carolina, and concurrently redesignated as Headquarters, 78th Infantry Division. It was designated as a replacement pool division on 1 October 1942, and remained in this assignment until 1 March 1943, when the 78th Division was restored to field duty, and to its training regimen. 78th Division moved to the Carolina Maneuver Area on 15 November 1943 to test its training, and then returned to Camp Butner on 7 December 1943. The personnel then went on Christmas leave, and deployed to the Tennessee Maneuver Area on 25 January 1944, where they participated in the 5th Second Army Tennessee Maneuvers. They then moved to Camp Pickett, Virginia, where they filled their TO&E, (table of organization and equipment), then deployed to the staging area at Camp Kilmer, New Jersey, on 4 October 1944.

==== Division organization ====
The division consisted of the following units:

78th Infantry Division organization (click to enlarge)

- 78th Infantry Division
  - 78th Infantry Division Headquarters
  - 78th Cavalry Reconnaissance Troop (Mechanized) (M3 scout cars and then M8 Greyhound armored cars)
  - 309th Infantry Regiment
    - Headquarters and Headquarters Company
    - 3× Infantry battalions
      - each battalion consists of: 1× Headquarters and Headquarters Company, 3× Rifle companies, 1× Heavy Weapons Company
    - Cannon Company (T12 Gun Motor Carriages and T19 Howitzer Motor Carriages, later replaced by either M3 105mm towed howitzers or M7 Priest self propelled howitzers)
    - Anti-Tank Company (M3 37mm anti-tank guns, which were replaced by 1944 with M1 57mm anti-tank guns)
    - Service Company
  - 310th Infantry Regiment
    - same organization as 309th Infantry Regiment
  - 311th Infantry Regiment
    - same organization as 309th Infantry Regiment
  - 78th Infantry Division Artillery
    - Headquarters and Headquarters Battery
    - 307th Field Artillery Battalion
      - Headquarters and Headquarters Battery
      - 3× Batteries (M2 105mm towed howitzers)
      - Service Battery
    - 308th Field Artillery Battalion
      - same organization as 307th Field Artillery Battalion
    - 309th Field Artillery Battalion
      - Headquarters and Headquarters Battery
      - 3× Batteries (M1 155mm towed howitzers)
      - Service Battery
    - 903rd Field Artillery Battalion
      - same organization as 307th Field Artillery Battalion
  - Headquarters Special Troops
    - Headquarters Company, 78th Infantry Division
    - 78th Signal Company
    - 78th Quartermaster Company
    - 778th Ordnance Light Maintenance Company
    - Military Police Platoon
    - 78th Infantry Division Band (attached)
  - 303rd Engineer Combat Battalion
    - Headquarters and Headquarters and Service Company
    - 3× Engineer combat companies
  - 303rd Medical Battalion
    - Headquarters and Headquarters Detachment
    - 3× Collecting companies
    - Clearing Company
- Units attached to Europe:
  - 552nd Antiaircraft Artillery Battalion (AW) 20 December 1944 – after VE day
  - 628th Tank Destroyer Battalion 19 December 1944 – 23 December 1944
  - 709th Tank Battalion 10 December 1944 – 25 January 1945
  - 736th Tank Battalion 25 January 1945 – 1 February 1945
  - 774th Tank Battalion 3 February 1945 – 24 February 1945
  - 817th Tank Destroyer Battalion 1 December 1944 – 6 December 1944
  - 893rd Tank Destroyer Battalion 11 December 1944 – after VE day

==== Combat chronicle ====
After two years as a training division, the 78th embarked for the European Theatre from the New York POE on 14 October 1944, whereupon they sailed for England. They arrived on 26 October 1944, and after further training crossed to France on 22 November 1944.

After landing in France, the division moved to Tongeren, Belgium, on 27 November 1944, and to Roetgen, Germany, on 7 December 1944, to prepare for combat. The 311th Infantry Regiment was attached to the US 8th Infantry Division in the Hurtgen Forest, 10 December. The 309th and 310th Infantry Regiments relieved elements of the 1st Division in the line in the vicinity of Entenpfuhl, 1–12 December. On the 13th these regiments smashed into Simmerath, Witzerath, and Bickerath and were fighting for Kesternich when Gerd von Rundstedt launched his counteroffensive in the Monschau area, on 18 December.

The 78th held the area it had taken from the Siegfried Line against German attacks throughout the winter. The Division attacked, 30 January 1945, and took Kesternich, 2 February, the town of Schmidt on the 8th, and captured intact the vital Schwammanauel Dam the next day. In the advance, the Roer River was crossed, 28 February, and the division joined the offensive of the First and Ninth Armies toward the Rhine. That river was crossed over the Ludendorff Bridge at Remagen, 8 March, by the 310th Regiment, the first troops to cross in the wake of the 9th Armored Division. That unit, attached to the 9th Armored and acting as a motorized unit had driven across Germany capturing Euskirchen, Rheinbach, and Bad Neuenahr. The 78th expanded the bridgehead, taking Honnef and cutting part of the Autobahn, 16 March. From 2 April to 8 May, the division was active in the reduction of the Ruhr Pocket and at VE-day was stationed near Marburg. In mid-November 1945 the division relieved the 82nd Airborne Division on occupation duty in Berlin. In May 1946, the 3rd Inf Regiment was moved to Berlin and on 15 June, it took over the Berlin Military District from the division.

The 78th Infantry Division was subsequently inactivated at Berlin on 16 June 1946. The division's infantry regiments were also inactivated as follows: 309th Infantry Regiment between 15 Apr – May 22, 1946, in Germany; 310th Infantry Regiment on 15 Jun 1946, at Berlin; 311th Infantry Regiment on 22 May 1946, in Germany. The division remained on occupation duty in Germany until it was inactivated on 22 May 1946.

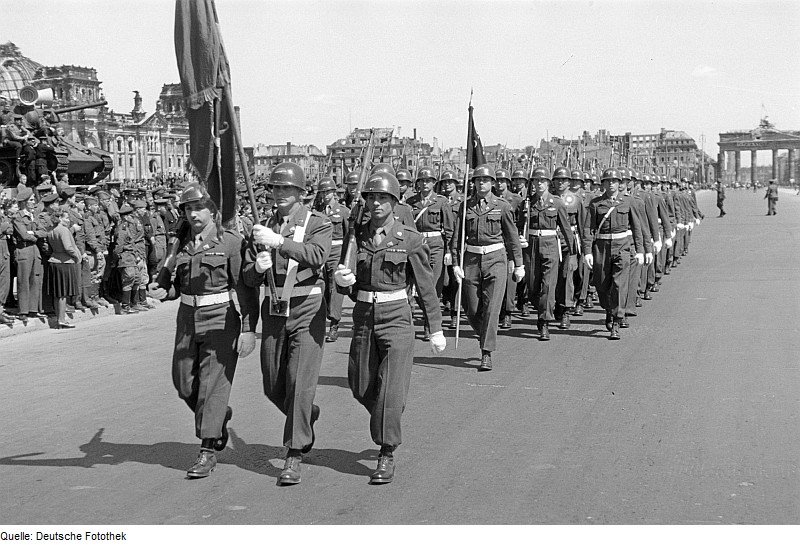
On parade in Berlin, 8 May 1946

==== Casualties ====
- Total battle casualties: 8,146
- Killed in action: 1,427
- Wounded in action: 6,103
- Missing in action: 231
- Prisoner of war: 385

==== Assignments in ETO ====
- 9 November 1944: Ninth Army, 12th Army Group.
- 28 November 1944: XIX Corps
- 5 December 1944: V Corps, First Army, 12th Army Group.
- 18 December 1944: VII Corps.
- 20 December 1944: Attached, with the entire First Army, to the British 21st Army Group.
- 22 December 1944: XIX Corps, Ninth Army (attached to the British 21st Army Group), 12th Army Group.
- 2 February 1945: V Corps, First Army, 12th Army Group.
- 3 February 1945: XVIII (Abn) Corps.
- 12 February 1945: III Corps.
- 16 March 1945: VII Corps.
- 3 April 1945: XVIII (Abn) Corps.
- 19 April 1945: First Army, 12th Army Group.
- 22 May 1946: Deactivated

==== Individual awards ====
One Medal of Honor recipient (Jonah Edward Kelley, of the 311th Infantry); ten Distinguished Service Crosses; 599 Silver Star medals; 3,909 Bronze Star medals and 5,454 Purple Hearts. 1,368 officers and enlisted men had perished.

=== Recent history ===
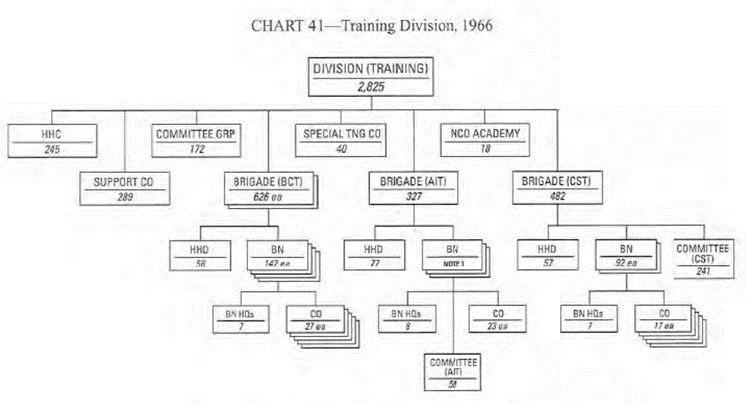
Standard organization chart for a training division

On 1 November 1946, the 78th Infantry Division was reactivated at Newark, New Jersey. The headquarters location was changed on 9 November 1955 to Kearny, New Jersey, and on 6 December 1958 to Edison, New Jersey.

The 78th Division was deployed to Southwest Asia 1990 and 1991 when the 920th Transportation Company (Medium, Petroleum) to support operations in Desert Storm. The 1018th Reception Battalion, the 2nd Brigade OSUT Headquarters, and the 1st and 3rd Battalion of the 310th Regiment as well as the 1st Brigade's 3rd Battalion, 309th Regiment with a composite detachment from the 78th Training Support Brigade, provided assistance in necessary training base expansion at Fort Dix. The 348th Military Police Detachment conducted protective service missions for key national leaders throughout the world during the mobilization period. In addition, many individuals from the 78th served as "fillers" in other deployed units.

On 1 October 1993, the division was reorganized and redesignated as Headquarters, 78th Division (Exercise), under the Army's "Bold Shift" initiative. The new mission is to conduct small unit collective training (Lane) and computerized battle simulation exercises for client units in the First Army East area (a 14 state region). Like the other exercise divisions, the 1st Brigade was designated as the simulations exercise unit, conducting Battle Command and Staff Training for US Army Reserve and Army National Guard units at the battalion, brigade, command, and division levels. This training uses the simulations models used by the Regular Army in conducting WARFIGHTER exercises. The other brigades within the division (2d through 5th depending on the division) conducted field training for units at the squad, platoon, and company levels. In all units, then made up of US Army Reserve soldiers, there were detachments of Regular Army soldiers assigned to manage the day-to-day requirements and planning of exercises as part of the Congressionally mandated Ground Forces Readiness Enhancement (GFRE – popularly known as "Jeffries") program. This program was partially instituted to ensure that reserve component units would have continual training support in order to preclude some of the training and readiness problems that were discovered in the ramp-up, and eventual deployments, in support of Desert Storm.

One of five exercise divisions in the United States Army, the 78th Division Headquarters, and its 1st Brigade, were for many years headquartered at the Kilmer Reserve Center (the former Camp Kilmer) in Edison, New Jersey, with subordinate units located in New Jersey, Rhode Island, Massachusetts, Virginia, Maryland, Pennsylvania and New York.

As a result of the 2005 BRAC, the division's headquarters and its 1st Brigade were relocated to Fort Dix, New Jersey, joining the already located Division's 2d Brigade (LANES) and some 1st Brigade (BCST) subordinate elements.

On 17 October 1999, the division was redesignated from 78th Division (Exercise) to 78th Division (Training Support) to reflect the growing change in the type of training provided by the division's units. There was also an associated change in the manning of the unit, adding National Guard personnel to the regulars and Army Reservists already assigned. This was one of the first instances of the growing multi-component organization of US Army units that deal with Reserve Component training and operations.

In 1999, the 189th Infantry Brigade was reflagged as the 4th Brigade, 78th Division (TS) and merged with the existing 4th Brigade, 78th Division (Exercise). The reorganization created a unique unit consisting of active-component, National Guard, civilian and drilling US Army Reservists. On 1 October 2009, the division was reorganized and redesignated as Headquarters, 78th Training Brigade, and on 1 October 2010, it was reorganized and redesignated as Headquarters, 78th Training Division.

The 4th Brigade is a tenant unit on Fort Bragg with headquarters at the 78th Division (Training Support), Edison, New Jersey. The brigade's responsibility is to train, coach, teach and mentor the Reserve and Army National Guard units of North Carolina.

The 4th Brigade, 78th Division (Training Support) provides training assistance, support, and evaluation to priority Reserve Component units and all other units within capabilities. Synchronize training support within area of responsibility in order to enhance individual and unit readiness to meet directed mobilization and/or wartime requirements. On order, activate or augment Mobilization Assistance Teams (MATs) to assist installation commanders in post-mobilization training and validation of mobilized units for deployment. On order, deploy a Defense Coordinating Officer (DCO) and/or a Defense Coordinating Element (DCE) to coordinate Military Support to Civilian Authorities (MSCA) during federal disaster response operations. Provide command and control of subordinate units.

1st BN (LS), 313th Regiment, 4th BDE, provides Logistic Support for a multi-component (AC/USAR/ARNG) training support brigade that conducts lanes training, TAM evals for priority RC client units; On order provides mobilization augmentation training and MSCA.

== Organization ==
The 78th Training Division is a subordinate unit of the 84th Training Command. As of January 2026 the division consists of the following units:

- 78th Training Division, at the Fort Dix entity of Joint Base McGuire–Dix–Lakehurst (NJ)
  - Mission Training Complex (MTC), at the Fort Dix entity of Joint Base McGuire–Dix–Lakehurst (NJ)
  - 1st Brigade, at the Fort Dix entity of Joint Base McGuire–Dix–Lakehurst (NJ)
    - 1st Mission Command Training Detachment (MCTD), at the Fort Dix entity of Joint Base McGuire–Dix–Lakehurst (NJ)
      - 1st Branch, 1st MCTD, in Lancaster (PA)
    - 2nd Mission Command Training Detachment (MCTD), at the Fort Dix entity of Joint Base McGuire–Dix–Lakehurst (NJ)
      - 1st Branch, 2nd MCTD, in White Plains (MD)
    - 3rd Battalion, 318th Regiment (Observe/Controller Trainer — OC/T), at Fort Meade (MD)
      - Alpha Company, 3rd Battalion, 318th Infantry Regiment (Observe/Controller Trainer — OC/T), at Fort Belvoir (VA)
      - Charlie Company, 3rd Battalion, 318th Infantry Regiment (Observe/Controller Trainer — OC/T), in Coraopolis (PA)
    - 2nd Battalion, 323rd Regiment (Observe/Controller Trainer — OC/T), in Lumberton (NC)
  - 2nd Brigade, at Naval Station Newport (RI)
    - 1st Mission Command Training Detachment (MCTD), at Naval Station Newport (RI)
      - 1st Branch, 1st MCTD, in Fort Devens (MA)
    - 2nd Mission Command Training Detachment (MCTD), in Danbury (CT)
      - 1st Branch, 2nd MCTD, in Coraopolis (PA)
    - 3rd Battalion, 309th Regiment (Observe/Controller Trainer — OC/T), in Syracuse (NY)
    - 2nd Battalion, 311th Regiment (Observe/Controller Trainer — OC/T), at Fort Bragg (NC)

== Insignia ==
The shoulder sleeve insignia was originally approved for the 78th Infantry Division on 27 May 1922. It was retained for the 78th Division (Training) on 11 Sep 1959. The insignia was redesignated on 1 Oct 1993 for the 78th Division (Exercise) and the description revised to provide metric measurements. The insignia was redesignated for the 78th Division (Training Support) on 17 Oct 1999.

=== Distinctive unit insignia ===
- Description: A gold color metal and enamel device 1 3/16 inches (3.0 cm) in height overall, consisting of a white enamel alerion on a scarlet enamel disc centered upon a blue enamel equilateral triangle with notched sides, all in front of two white enamel lightning flashes in a V form contained at top and bottom by a continuous scarlet scroll inscribed below with the word "AUDACITER" in gold.
- Symbolism: The white alerion on scarlet is from the arms of Lorraine Province in France where the organization served in three World War I campaigns. In World War II, the unit participated in the Ardennes-Alsace, Rhineland and Central Europe campaigns indicated by the three points, in the color blue for Infantry and for the area of the Rhine River. The white flashes and the red of the scroll allude to the Division shoulder sleeve insignia.
- Background: The distinctive unit insignia was originally approved for the 78th Division (Training) on 21 Dec 1971. It was redesignated on 1 Oct 1993 for the 78th Division (Exercise) and the description revised to provide metric measurements. On 17 Oct 1999 the insignia was redesignated for the 78th Division (Training Support).

== Honors ==
=== Campaign participation credit ===
Conflict	Streamer	Year(s)
World War I	St. Mihiel	1918
World War I	Meuse-Argonne	1918
World War I	Lorraine	1918
World War II	Rhineland	1944
World War II	Ardennes-Alsace	1944
World War II	Central Europe	1945

=== Decorations ===
Ribbon	Award	Embroidered	Year	Earned by
	Presidential Unit Citation	SCHWAMMENAUEL DAM	1944	1st Battalion, 309th Regiment
	Presidential Unit Citation	REMAGEN BRIDGEHEAD	1945	1st Battalion, 310th Regiment
	Presidential Unit Citation	ROER-RHINE RIVERS	1945	3rd Battalion, 310th Regiment
	Presidential Unit Citation	SIEGFRIED LINE	1944	2nd Battalion, 311th Regiment
	Army Superior Unit Award	Pre and Post-Mobilization Training	2004–2005	1st Battalion, 309th Regiment; 2nd Battalion, 309th Regiment
	Army Superior Unit Award	Pre and Post-Mobilization Training	2008–2011	1st Battalion, 310th Regiment; 2nd Battalion, 310th Regiment; 1st Battalion, 311th Regiment; 2nd Battalion, 311th Regiment

=== Other honors ===
A portion of Pine Swamp Road in Mineral County, West Virginia was named "WWII 78th Lightning Division Road" in honor of the division by the West Virginia Legislature. A portion of Interstate 78 in Pennsylvania is also named after the 78th division.

== In popular culture ==
In the 2019 superhero film Avengers: Endgame, soldiers of the 78th are portrayed at Camp Lehigh, New Jersey. Captain America (Chris Evans) impersonates an officer of the 78th while infiltrating the compound to retrieve one of the Infinity Stones with help from Tony Stark (Robert Downey, Jr.)
