= Butner (disambiguation) =

Butner or Bütner may refer to:

== Places ==
- Butner, North Carolina
  - Federal Medical Center, Butner
  - Federal Correctional Complex, Butner
  - Camp Butner, former Army installation
- Butner, Oklahoma

== Other ==
- Bütner
- Butner-Creedmoor News, weekly paper in NC
- Glass and Butner, architectural partnership
- USS General H. W. Butner, troopship named after Henry Butner

== See also ==
- Büttner
- Bunter (disambiguation)
