= Büttner =

Büttner is a German surname. Notable people with the surname include:

- Alexander Büttner (born 1989), Dutch footballer
- Brenda Buttner (1961–2017), American business correspondent
- Carl Artur Büttner, German coffee-roaster
- Christian Büttner (born 1979), German record producer and musician
- Erich Büttner (painter) (1889–1936), German painter
- Erich Büttner (pilot) (died 1945), German World War II fighter ace
- Hartmut Büttner (born 1952), German politician
- Hieronymus Büttner (c. 1480 – 1546/47), Silesian printer and publisher
- Jean Buttner, American businessman
- Karin Büttner-Janz (born 1952), medical doctor and artistic gymnast
- Karina Buttner, Paraguayan beauty quee
- Kurt Büttner (1881–1967), German physician and entomologist who specialised in Heteroptera
- Matthias Büttner (born 1990), German politician
- Paul Büttner (1870–1943), German composer
- Richard Büttner (1858–1927), German botanist and mineralogist involved in the exploration of the Congo
- Steffen Büttner (born 1963), German footballer
- Theodora Büttner (born 1930), East German historian

== Companies ==
- Büttner Propeller, a German propeller and aircraft manufacturer

== See also ==
- System Büttner coffee maker, a special type of steeping & drip filtering coffee maker
- Butner (disambiguation)
- Biittner
- Bitner
- Bittner
- Bytnar
