= Buettner =

Buettner is a surname. Notable people with the surname include:

- Carol A. Buettner (born 1948), American politician
- Jan Henric Buettner (born 1964), German entrepreneur
- Kenneth L. Buettner (born 1950), American judge
- Michael Buettner (born 1973), Australian rugby league official and former player
- Robert Buettner (born 1947), American novelist

== See also ==
- Büttner, a similarly spelled surname
