= 8th Infantry Regiment (United States) =

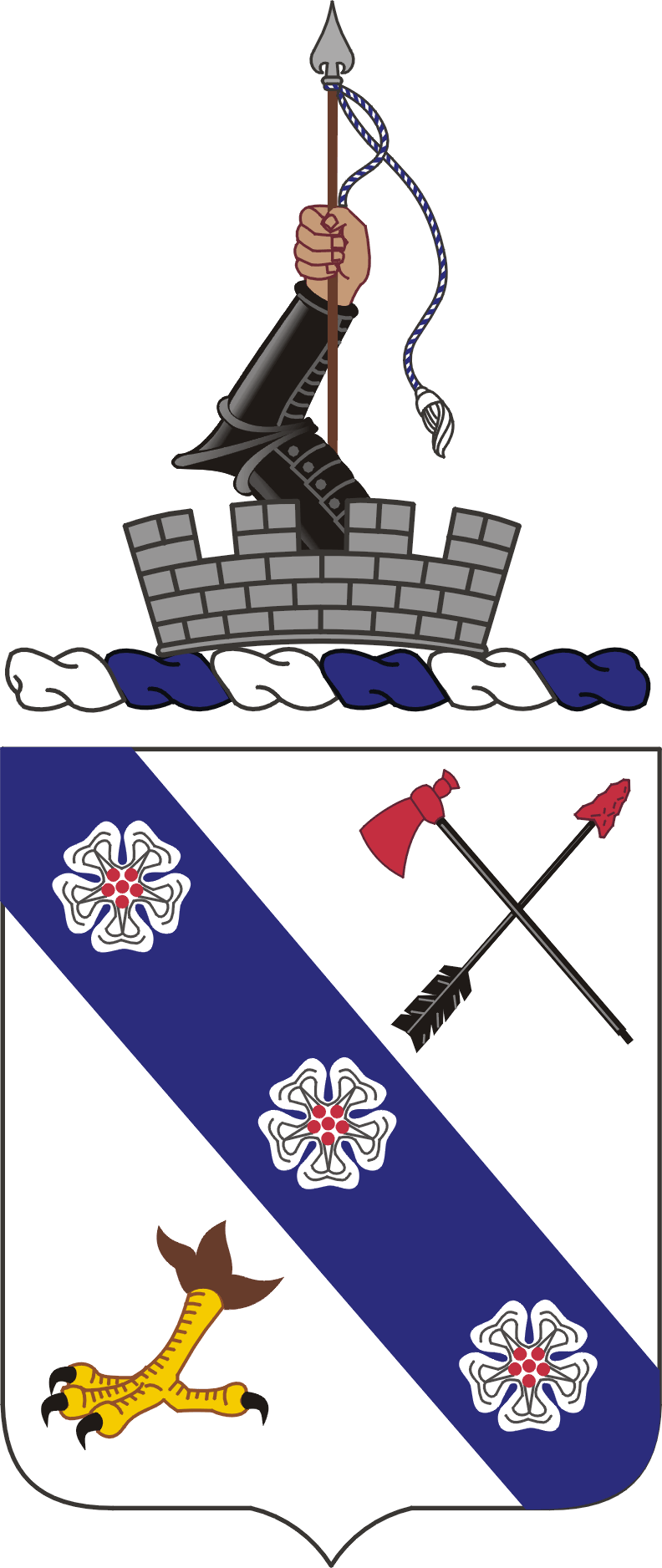
- Coat of arms
- Active: 1838 – present
- Country: United States
- Branch: United States Army
- Type: Infantry
- Garrison/HQ: Fort Carson, Colorado
- Nickname: Fighting Eagles
- Motto: "Patriae Fidelitas" ("Loyalty to Country")
- Engagements: Mexican War; American Civil War; Indian Wars; Philippine Insurrection; Moro Rebellion; World War I World War II; Vietnam War; Iraq Campaign

Commanders
- Notable commanders: Benjamin A. Poore; Walter C. Short; Fay W. Brabson; George C. Marshall; James Van Fleet

Insignia
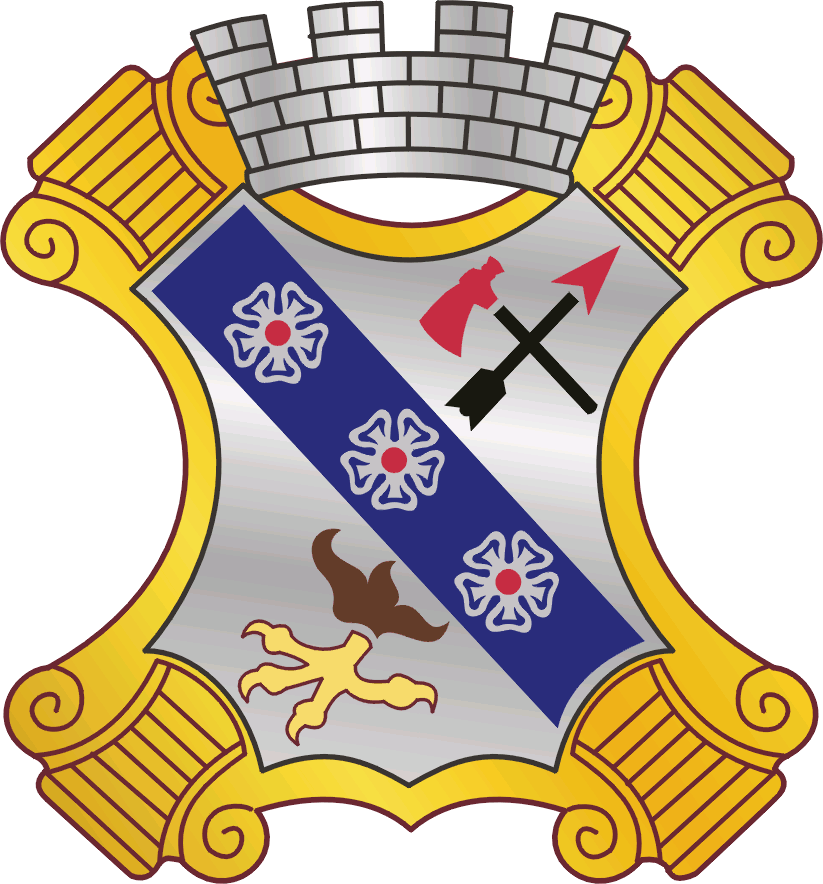
- Distinctive unit insignia

The 8th Infantry Regiment of the United States, also known as the "Fighting Eagles", is an infantry regiment in the United States Army. The 8th Infantry participated in the Mexican War, American Civil War, Philippine Insurrection, Moro Rebellion, World War I, World War II, Vietnam War, and Iraq Campaign.

== Coat of arms ==
=== Blazon ===
1. Shield: Argent on a bend azure (heraldry), between (in sinister chief) a tomahawk Gules halved Sable and an arrow of the last barbed of the third in saltire and in dexter base an eagle's claw erased Proper, three roses of the field seeded of the third.
2. Crest: On a wreath of the colors Argent and Azure out of a mural coronet a dexter arm in armor embowed the hand grasping a flagstaff with tassel all Proper.
3. Motto: "PATRIAE FIDELITAS" (Loyalty to Country).

=== Symbolism ===
- Shield:
1. The shield is white with a blue bend, the Infantry colors.
2. The three heraldic flowers on the bend are symbolic of: first, the Rose, the flower of the state of New York, where the regimental headquarters was first organized; second, the Hispida, the flower of the Philippines, where the regiment saw service during the Insurrection; and third, the temple flower, which is the flower of Cuba, where the 8th served during the War with Spain.
3. The arrow and tomahawk represent the Indian campaigns in which the regiment has participated. The claw representing the maimed strength of the Prussian eagle alludes to the regiment's part in the Occupation of Germany after World War I.
- Crest: The crest symbolizes service in the Mexican War; the 8th was the first United States Regiment to plant its colors on the fort at Churubusco.

=== Background ===
1. The coat of arms was approved on 1923-07-06.
2. It was amended to correct the spelling of the motto on 1963-10-01.

== Distinctive unit insignia ==
=== Description ===
1. Argent on a bend Azure, between in sinister chief a tomahawk Gules halved Sable and an arrow of the last barbed of the third in saltire and in dexter base an eagle's claw erased Proper, three roses of the field seeded of the third, surmounted by a mural crown, the shield and crown mounted on a heavy Roman Gold boss figure in high relief.
2. The overall height of the insignia is 1 5/32 inches (2.9 cm).

=== Symbolism ===
1. The shield is silver (white) with a blue bend, the Infantry colors.
2. The three heraldic flowers on the bend are symbolic of: first, the rose, the flower of the state of New York, where the regimental headquarters was first organized; second, the hispida, the flower of the Philippines, where the regiment saw service during the Insurrection; and third, the temple flower, which is the flower of Cuba, where the 8th served during the War with Spain.
3. The arrow and tomahawk represent the Indian campaigns in which the regiment has participated.
4. The claw representing the maimed strength of the Prussian eagle alludes to the regiment's part in the Occupation of Germany after World War I.

=== Background ===
1. The distinctive unit insignia was approved on 1923-11-25.
2. It was amended to correct the description on 1925-04-28.

== Lineage ==
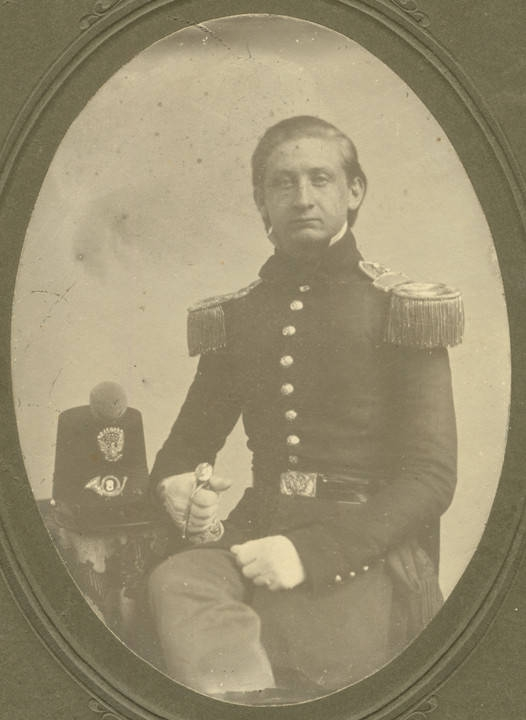
Owen Kenan McLemore, 8th U.S. Infantry, 1856

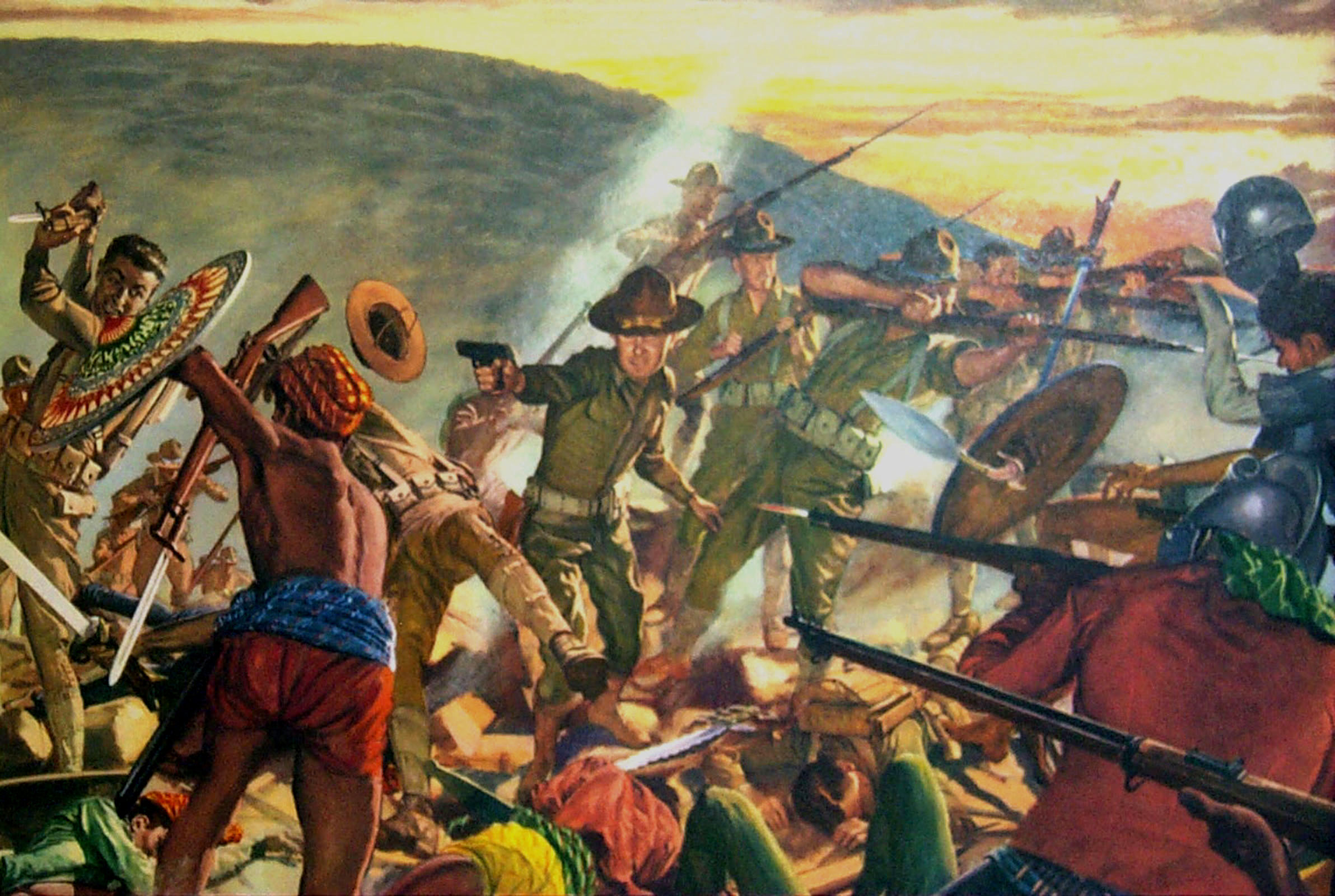
As depicted by the United States Army Center of Military History, the "four-day battle of Bagsak Mountain on Jolo Island in the Philippines took place from 11 to 15 June 1913. Americans of the 8th Infantry and the Philippine Scouts, personally led by Brigadier General John J. Pershing, brought to an end years of bitter struggle against the Moro pirates."

Constituted 5 July 1838 in the Regular Army as the 8th Infantry

Organized in July 1838 in New York, Vermont, and Michigan

Consolidated in May 1869 with the 33d Infantry (see ANNEX) and consolidated unit designated as the 8th Infantry

Assigned 17 December 1917 to the 8th Division

Relieved 24 March 1923 from assignment to the 8th Division and assigned to the 4th Division (later redesignated as the 4th Infantry Division)

Inactivated 25 February 1946 at Camp Butner, North Carolina

Activated 15 July 1947 at Fort Ord, California

Relieved 1 April 1957 from assignment to the 4th Infantry Division and reorganized as a parent regiment under the Combat Arms Regimental System

Withdrawn 1 August 1984 from the Combat Arms Regimental System and reorganized under the United States Army Regimental System

=== Annex ===
Constituted 3 May 1861 in the Regular Army as the 3d Battalion, 15th Infantry

Organized by March 1864 at Fort Adams, Rhode Island

Reorganized and redesignated 21 September 1866 as the 33d Infantry

Consolidated in May 1869 with the 8th Infantry and consolidated unit designated as the 8th Infantry

=== Honors ===
The regiment has earned a total 59 campaign streamers.

Decorations of the "Fighting Eagles" Battalion include three presidential unit citations (four citations for A Co. and C Co.). The first citation was awarded to the regiment during World War II on 6 June 1944, for action on the beaches of Normandy. Two other presidential unit citations were awarded to the battalion for actions in Pleiku Province and Dak To district in the Republic of Vietnam. A co and C co were awarded another presidential unit citation for Kontum Province in the Republic of Vietnam.

In World War II, the 8th Infantry Regiment was cited twice in the order of the day by the Belgian Army – the first for action in the Belgian Campaign, and later for action in the Ardennes. The Belgian Government subsequently awarded the regiment the Belgian Fourragère.

The 1st Battalion, 8th Infantry won nine campaign streamers, and one in May and 2nd with it being an oak leaf cluster in October–November 1967 Presidential Unit Citation with one oak leaf cluster, and supporting units, for action in Vietnam from 1966 to 1970, participating in operations Sam Houston, Francis Marion, Don Quin, and Paul Revere III, and IV. The Vietnamese Government awarded the battalion the Vietnamese Cross of Gallantry with Palm and the Civil Action Medal First Class. Alpha and Charlie Companies were awarded an oak leaf cluster to their Presidential Unit Citation for extraordinary heroism in the Republic of Vietnam. Companies A and C sought out, engaged and decisively defeated an overwhelmingly larger force by deploying small, isolated patrols and conducting company and platoon-size reconnaissance-in-force operations. A-1-4 engineers took much of the brunt blast of automatics and mortar fire from human waves charging and retreating many times. They received A Company 4th Engineers Battalion, Combat U.S. Army.

The regiment had seven Medal of Honor recipients. A few of the famous past commanders include former General of the Army George C. Marshall, and General James Van Fleet, who led the regiment ashore on D-Day.

== Civil War ==
During the American Civil War, the 8th Infantry Regiment was involved in several major battles and campaigns. It has a monument dedicated to its service during the war at Gettysburg.

== 1st Battalion ==
The 1st Battalion (Mechanized), 8th Infantry Regiment was originally organized on 1 July 1838 as a detachment of recruits at Detroit, Michigan. It was designated on 5 July 1838 as Company A, 8th Infantry, and concurrently constituted in the regular Army. It was consolidated in May 1869 with Company A, 33rd Infantry, with the consolidated unit being designated as Company A, 8th Infantry. 1st Battalion, 8th Infantry Regiment is currently part of the 3rd Armored Brigade Combat Team (ABCT) (Stryker brigade as of 2026), 4th Infantry Division located at Fort Carson, Colorado.

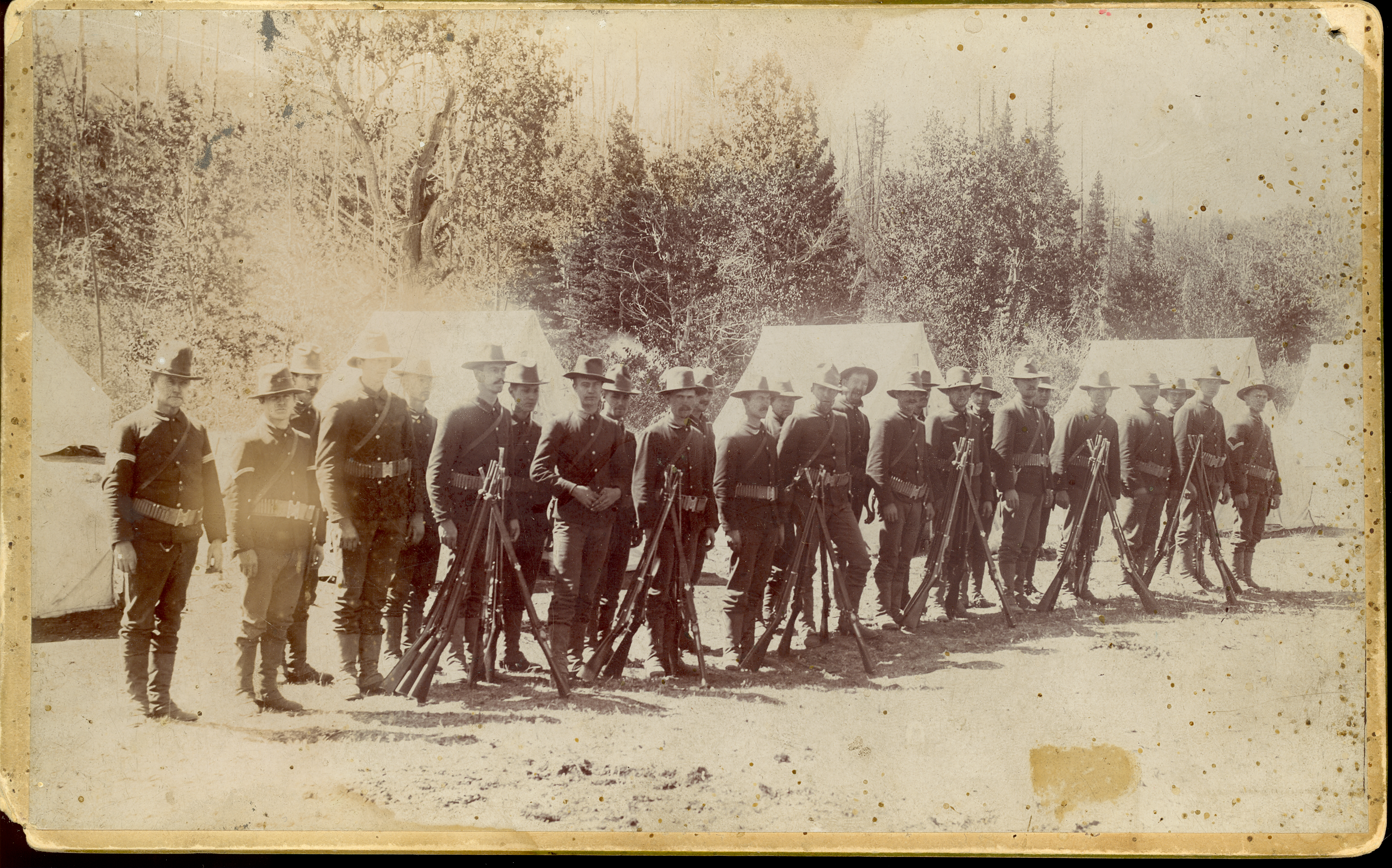
A Line of Soldiers from Company A of the 8th Infantry in Pine Ridge, South Dakota November 1890

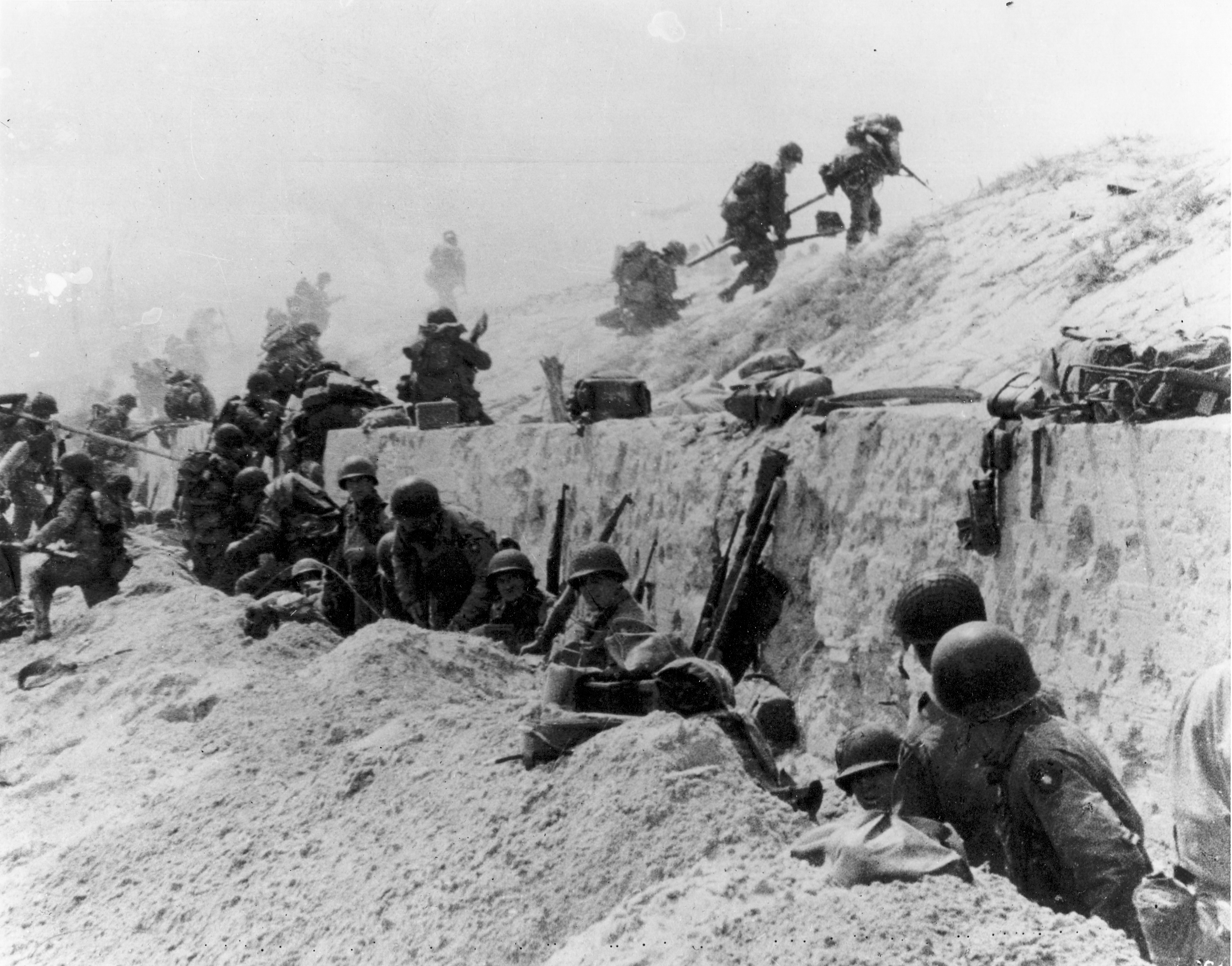
Troops of the 8th Infantry Regiment of the 4th Infantry Division move off the Utah Beachhead on D-Day

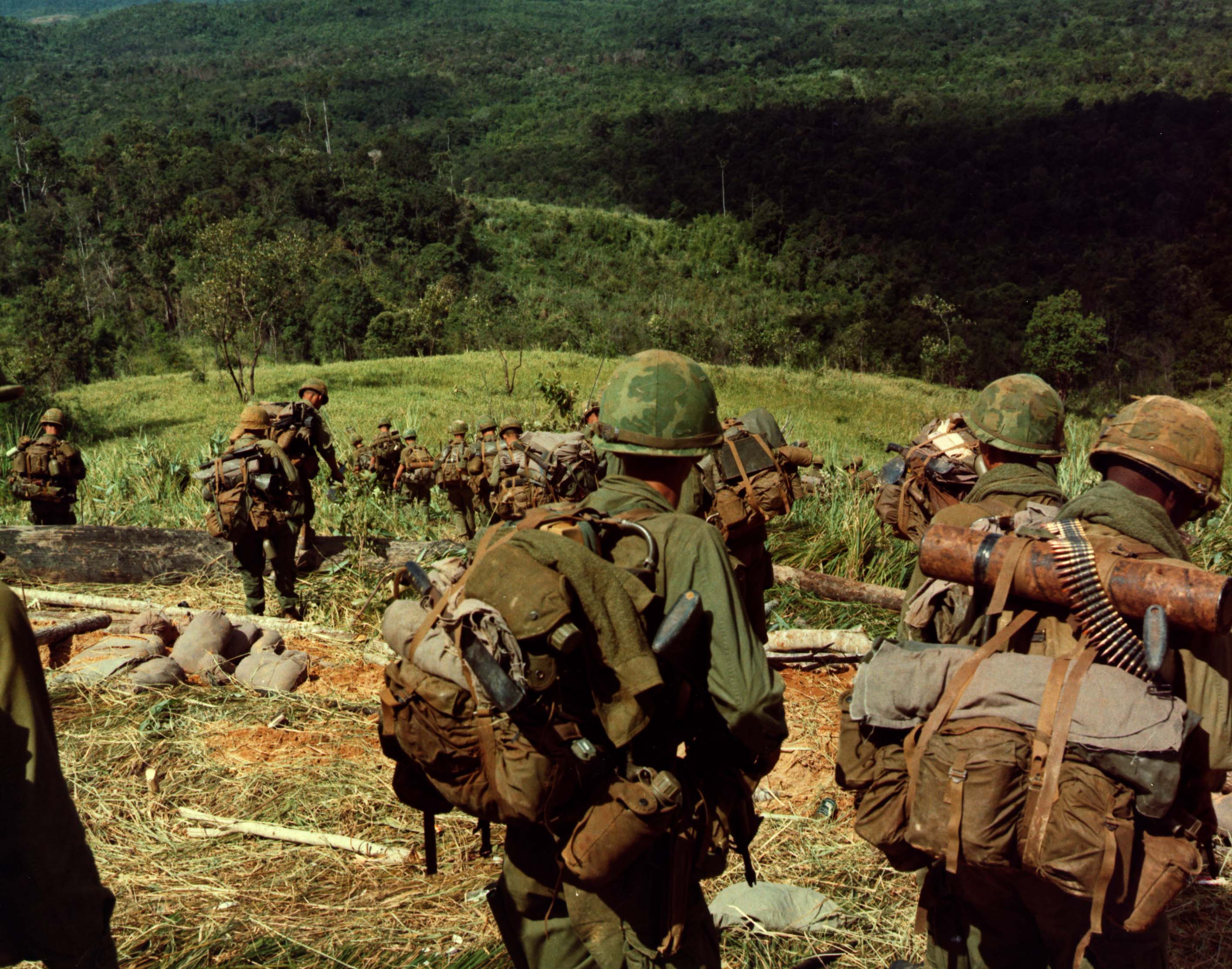
Members of Co. C, 1st Bn, 8th Inf, 1st Bde, 4th Inf Div, descend the side of Hill 742, located five miles northwest of Dak To. 14–17 November 1967.

=== World War I ===
The 8th Infantry was assigned on 17 December 1917 to the 8th Division. It was commanded by Colonel Walter Cowen Short, who led the regiment until his promotion to brigadier general and command of a brigade.

=== Interwar period ===
The 8th Infantry Regiment was stationed at Koblenz, Germany, as of July 1919 on occupation duty. It was assigned to the 1st Brigade, American Forces in Germany (AFG) in November 1919, and was relieved in April 1922 from the 1st Brigade, AFG. It sailed from Antwerp, Belgium, on 25 January 1923 on the troopship USAT St. Mihiel, and arrived on 7 February 1923 at Savannah, Georgia. The regiment, less the 2nd and 3rd Battalions, was transferred that same day to Fort Screven, Georgia; concurrently, the 2nd and 3rd Battalions were transferred to Fort Moultrie, South Carolina. The regiment's initial wartime mission in accordance with established war plans was to conduct a mobile defense against possible amphibious landing areas in support of the Harbor Defenses of Charleston and the Harbor Defenses of Savannah. The regiment was relieved from the 8th Division and assigned to the 4th Division on 24 March 1923. The 2nd Battalion participated in fighting fires in Charleston, South Carolina, in late April 1927. The regimental headquarters was transferred on 24 October 1929 to Fort Moultrie. The 3rd Battalion was inactivated on 31 October 1929 at Fort Moultrie. Company D was awarded the Edwin Howard Clark trophy for machine gun marksmanship for 1930. In April 1933, the regiment assumed command and control of Civilian Conservation Corps Districts F and I, Fourth Corps Area. Assigned Reserve officers conducted summer training with the regiment at Fort Moultrie. The regiment was transferred on 28 June 1940 to Fort Benning, Georgia.

=== World War II ===
The 8th Infantry Regiment assaulted Utah Beach on June 6, 1944. It was the first of the 4th Infantry Division's infantry regiments to land on Utah Beach. In World War II, the 8th Infantry Regiment was cited twice in the order of the day by the Belgian Army - the first for action in the Belgian Campaign, and later for action in the Ardennes. The Belgian Government subsequently awarded the regiment the Belgian Fourragere. The battalion was inactivated on 25 February 1946 at Camp Butner, North Carolina.

=== Vietnam War ===
The unit reactivated on 15 July 1947 at Fort Ord, California. It was reorganized and redesignated on 1 October 1963 as the 1st Battalion, 8th Infantry. The 1st Battalion 8th Infantry won nine campaign streamers for action in Vietnam from 1966 to 1970, participating in operations Sam Houston, Francis Marion, Don Quin and Paul Revere III. The Vietnamese government awarded the battalion the Vietnamese Cross of Gallantry with Palm and the Civil Action Medal First Class. Alpha and Charlie Companies were awarded a cluster to their presidential unit citations for extraordinary heroism in the Republic of Vietnam. Companies A and C sought out, engaged and decisively defeated an overwhelmingly larger force by deploying small, isolated patrols and conducting company and platoon size reconnaissance-in-force operations. It inactivated on 10 April 1970 at Fort Lewis, Washington and reactivated on 13 September 1972 at Fort Carson, CO.

=== Operation Spartan Shield ===
The battalion deployed to Kuwait with the entirety of the 4th Infantry Division's 3rd Armored Brigade Combat Team (ABCT) as part of the Operation Spartan Shield rotational Brigade Combat Team (BCT) in 2019.

== 2nd Battalion ==
The 2nd Battalion, 8th Infantry Regiment, was originally constituted on 5 July 1838 in the Regular Army as Company B, 8th Infantry, and organized at Detroit, Michigan. It consolidated in May 1869 with Company B, 33d Infantry, with the consolidated unit being designated as Company B, 8th Infantry.

=== World War I ===
The 8th Infantry was assigned on 17 December 1917 to the 8th Division and relieved on 24 March 1923 from this assignment to the 8th Division and reassigned to the 4th Division later re-designated as the 4th Infantry Division. Company B inactivated 25 February 1946 at Camp Butner, North Carolina.

=== Reactivation ===
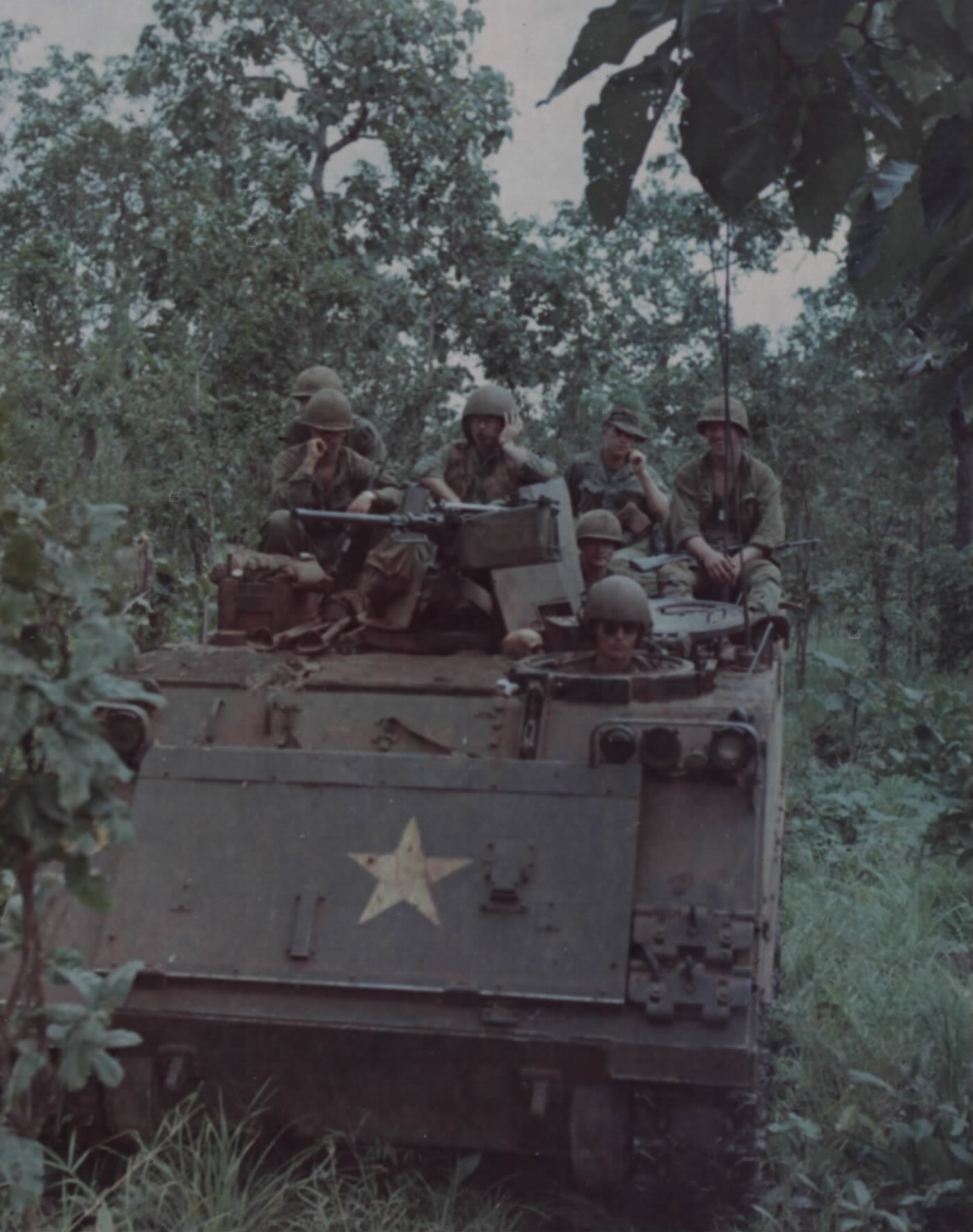
M113s carrying members of "C" Company, 2/8th Mechanized Infantry on a cordon and search mission in Phu Nhon District, 17 August 1967

It reactivated on 15 July 1947 at Fort Ord, California, and inactivated on 1 April 1957 at Fort Lewis, Washington, and relieved from assignment to the 4th Infantry Division. Re-designated on 1 August 1957 as Headquarters and Headquarters Company, 2d Battle Group, 8th Infantry, it was assigned to the 8th Infantry Division, and activated in Germany (with its organic elements concurrently constituted and activated). It was relieved on 1 January 1959 from assignment to the 8th Infantry Division and reassigned to the U.S. 1st Infantry Division. Reorganized and re-designated on 1 October 1963 as the 2d Battalion, 8th Infantry, it was concurrently relieved from assignment to the 1st Infantry Division and assigned to the U.S. 4th Infantry Division. It inactivated on 13 September 1972 at Fort Carson, Colorado. The unit activated on 1 August 1984 at Fort Carson, Colorado. It inactivated there on 15 December 1989 was relieved from assignment to the 4th Infantry Division. Reassigned on 16 December 1995 to the 2d Armored Division and activated at Fort Hood, Texas, it was relieved on 16 January 1996 from assignment to the 2d Armored Division and reassigned to the 4th Infantry Division.

== 3rd Battalion ==
=== Vietnam War ===
During Operation Wayne Grey at Landing Zone Brace 3 March 1969 in Vietnam 3rd Battalion Company "A" had at least 21 fatalities

== 4th Battalion ==
The unit served at Coleman Barracks, Sandhofen, Germany (near Mannheim) as part of the 8th Infantry Division (Mechanized). The Division later reflagged as 1st Armored Division during the draw down immediately following the end of the Cold War. 4-8 INF BN's mission during Operation Desert Storm was to guard the family housing areas immediately surrounding Campbell Barracks as well as the Army Airfield, both in Heidelberg. Following the end of hostilities, 11th Armored Cavalry Regiment (ACR) was sent to Kuwait as a security force. In the fall of 1991, 4-8 INF(-) relieved 11th ACR in Kuwait as the second rotation of security forces protecting Kuwait while the country continued rebuilding. The unit was sent (along with the rest of the brigade) to Fort Lewis, Washington in the summer of 1994. That fall, the unit was inactivated and re-designated 1st Battalion, 23rd Infantry Regiment, 2nd Infantry Division. This was the first time units of the 2nd Infantry Division set foot on US soil since the Korean War began.

=== OIF I (1st Battalion and 2nd Battalion). ===
In March 2003, the 1st Battalion, 8th Infantry Regiment attached to 1st Brigade, was the spearhead of the 4th Infantry Division passing through the 101st Air Assault Division and through 3rd Infantry Division at the northern edge of Baghdad. 1-8 seized Taji, Balad Airfield, and then proceeded north to Tikrit, secured the airfield in Tikrit and relieved the U.S. Marines occupying the palace compound. The battalion secured the Tikrit and began destroying resistance from the Iraqi forces and raids on Saddam supporter in the area. The 4th Infantry Division and its remaining brigades moved up Highway 1 through Baghdad, Taji, and on to Saddam Hussein's hometown of Tikrit where the Division headquarters is located for the rest of the deployment. The 2-8th Infantry, in conjunction with other components of 2nd Brigade, 4th Infantry Division, secured and held multiple airfields and military complexes for later use by follow-on forces as far north as K2 Airfield near Bayji. In May 2003, 1-8 Infantry returned to the 3rd Brigade and deployed to Jalula near the Iranian border and negotiated a disarming of five MEK (Iranian) brigades and then deployed north to Kurkuk to assist the 173rd Airborne Brigade in destroying resistance from the Iraqi Army. In July 2003, 1-8 Infantry and 3rd Brigade returned to the Township of Balad and Balad Airfield (LSA Anaconda) to set up five Forward Operating Bases (FOB) and remained to conduct combat operations until redeployment to Fort Carson, Colorado and Fort hood, Texas in March 2004.

SSG Dale Panchot (B/1-8 IN) (KIA on 17 Nov 2003, Balad) CPT Eric Paliwoda (B/4th EN) (KIA on 2 Jan 2004, Balad)

SPC James H. Pirtle (C/2-8 IN) (KIA in 2003)

=== OIF IRAQ 05-07 (2nd Battalion) ===
Under the command of LTC James Howard, 2–8 IN deployed in support of OIF 05–07 in November 2005. The battalion spent approximately three weeks at Camp Buehring, Kuwait conducting Reception, Staging, Integration, and Onward Movement (RSIO). In mid-December 2005 the battalion began its move north into Iraq via semi-tactical ground movement. The battalion moved north through southern Iraq, making stops along the way at NAVISTAR on the Kuwait/Iraq border, CSC CEDAR II, and CSC SCANIA before reaching FOB KALSU in northern Babil Province.

2–8 IN, in conjunction with 2nd Special Troops Battalion, and 2nd Brigade Headquarters conducted Relief in Place/Transfer of Authority with 155th AR BDE, Mississippi National Guard and 2nd Squadron, 11th Armored Cavalry Regiment in December 2006. 2–8 IN's area of operations included Babil Province north the Yusifiyah, south to Tounis, west to Mussayib, and east to the Ubaid. Within AO NORMANDY the major population centers controlled by 2–8 IN included Iskandariyah, Haswah, Eskan, the Hateen Apartments, Muelha, and an area known as Chaka 4 (or the Kilometers). In addition, 2–8 IN controlled a large portion of MSR TAMPA, from Checkpoint 15 all the way north to Checkpoint 22. The TALONS spent OIF 05-07 balancing kinetic operations with security and support operations, as well as keeping vital supply routes open through AO NORMANDY. Kinetic operations netted several high-value targets, while security and support operations allowed the local populace to assist in securing their villages and towns.

In November 2006 2nd Battalion, 8th Infantry Regiment redeployed to Fort Hood, Texas. Shortly after redeployment LTC James Howard relinquished command and 2–8 IN began to relocate from Fort Hood, Texas to Fort Carson, Colorado. 2–8 IN finalized the move in the Spring of 2007. LTC Doug Cardinale and Command Sergeant Major Richard Joyce assumed command of the battalion prior to it relocating to Fort Carson, Colorado. Both men assumed command and control of the unit after the relocation to Fort Carson Colorado.

=== OIF 08-09 IRAQ (2nd Battalion) ===
Upon arrival at Fort Carson, 2–8 IN began training up for yet another OIF deployment. In April 2008 the battalion conducted a month-long rotation at the National Training Center at Fort Irwin, California in preparation for OIF 08–09. The unit initially staged in Kuwait sometime during August. After in-processing, reception and vehicle draw. The unit occupied Camp Echo (Polish Army) in Iraq until finally the majority of the unit made the long vehicle convoy south to Basra Iraq (British Army). The unit deployed from September 2008 to September 2009 in support of Operation Iraqi Freedom. There were no combat related deaths during this Deployment.

=== OEF 11-12 Afghanistan ===
2-8 Infantry Battalion 4th ID deployed in support of Operation Enduring Freedom in the early summer of 2011. Upon return from Iraq, 2-8 began training and pre deployment tasks for an upcoming deployment to Afghanistan. 2-8 was one of the first Active units to re-align themselves to a Combined Arms Brigade. Originally they were two infantry companies (Alpha and Bravo Company) and two Armored Companies (Charlie and Delta). Also implemented within was a Forward support company and a Headquarters company. The two Armored companies turned in tanks and converted over to a light infantry company (while still keeping their Armored guidons and designations respectively). The Two armored companies were mixed between Tankers and Infantry along with other attachments. 2-8 Completed a Pinion Cannon rotation, Warhorse Bitz, A JRTC rotation, Platoon Live fire exercises and several other tasks before the deployment.

=== OEF 13-14 Kuwait ===
2-8 Infantry Regiment deployed to Kuwait in the late fall of 2013.

== Notable former members ==
- John Garland
- James Longstreet
- Viet Xuan Luong
- George L. Mabry, Jr.
- George C. Marshall
- David H. McNerney
- George Pickett
- James Van Fleet
- Gary J. Volesky
- William J. Worth
- Pascal Poolaw

== See also ==
- List of United States Regular Army Civil War units
