= Operation Wayne Grey =

Part of the Vietnam War (1969)

- Part of the Vietnam War
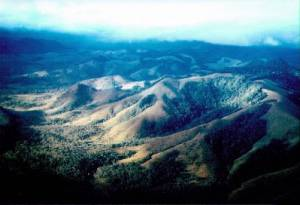
- Plei Trap Valley
Date	1 March to 14 April 1969
Location	Plei Trap Valley, Kontum Province, South Vietnam
Result	US operational success

Belligerents
United States	North Vietnam

Commanders and leaders
Colonel Hale H. Knight	

Units involved
1st Brigade, 4th Infantry Division	24th & 66th Infantry Regiments

Strength
~2,000	2,800+

Casualties and losses
106 killed 1 missing	US body count: 575 killed 4 captured

Operation Wayne Grey was an operation carried out by the United States Army, 1st Brigade, 4th Infantry Division and supporting elements, on March 1 to April 14, 1969. Its main objective was to cut off lines of communication and supply to the People's Army of Vietnam (PAVN) 24th and 66th Infantry Regiments as well as preventing them from retreating into Cambodia.

== Prelude ==
Captured documents and interrogations of Prisoners of war revealed that in late January to early February the PAVN 66th Regiment, 24th Regiment and elements of the 40th Artillery moved north into the Chu-Mom-Ray mountain area and had begun to conduct offensive operations. Aerial reconnaissance of firebases west of Polei Kleng Camp revealed heavy vehicle traffic and construction of roads deep into the Chu-Mom-Ray mountains and from the Cambodian border into the eastern Plei Trap valley. The confirmation of artillery and possible armor units suggested that a major offensive was being planned and that their likely target was Kontum City and Polei Kleng Camp.

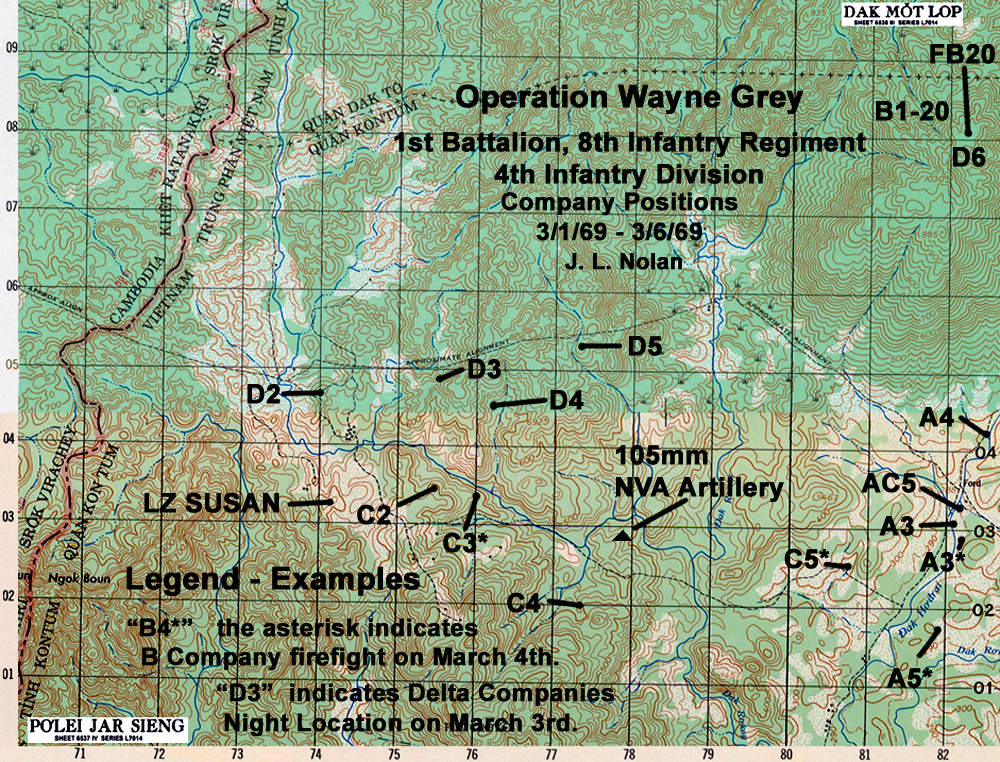
OP Wayne Grey Movements I

Operation Wayne Grey began on 1 March, when A Company of the 3rd Battalion, 12th Infantry out of Polei Mrong were combat assaulted into Landing Zone (LZ) Swinger (14.429°N 107.627°E). Their objective was to secure the LZ and establish a firebase to allow for the placement of artillery. The position would be used to support the 3/12th, 1/8th and 3/8th Infantry as they conducted operations in Plei Trap. The first helicopter was able to land and offload without incident. After the second helicopter began offloading its troops, they were ambushed by sappers from the PAVN K25B Engineer battalion. The initial firefight lasted for over three hours before the PAVN retreated and the 1/92nd Field Artillery was able to land and set up their guns. B Company, 1/8th assaulted into Firebase 20 (14.492°N 107.597°E) and C Company, 3/8th into Firebase Pause (14.36°N 107.655°E) followed by A and C Companies of the 6/29 Artillery. The 6/29th Artillery was now in position to provide support for 1st Brigade's sweep of Plei Trap. On 2 March, A Company, 1/8th secured LZ Turkey (14.474°N 107.598°E) and began reconnaissance operations, while Companies C and D, 1/8th assaulted into LZ Susan (14.49°N 107.54°E). The remaining companies from the 3/8th were inserted in LZ's in and around LZ Mary (14.386°N 107.578°E).

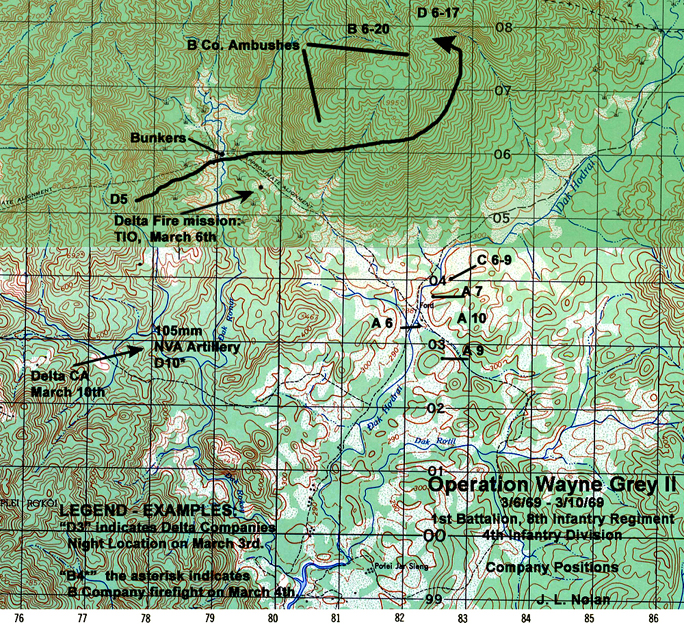
OP Wayne Grey Movements II

== Phase I ==
Operations along the Plei Trap road were conducted by A, C and D Companies, 1/8th Infantry. Beginning on 1 March, with the support of the A/7-17th Air Cavalry the 1/8th was able to locate and destroy communications, supplies and vehicles along the Plei Trap road, as well as the recapturing of two M101 howitzers captured by the PAVN.

The battle of Landing Zone Brace was the largest and most significant battle of the operation. It began on 3 March when A Company, 3/8th Infantry came into contact with a battalion of PAVN troops at their headquarters at the top of a hill (14.345°N 107.605°E). A Company suffered heavy casualties during the battle and was forced to retreat. It was extracted on March 4 after heavy fighting at its night location. B and C Companies, 3/8th, were successful at taking the hill on 6 March. A firebase was constructed after the LZ, now named Brace, was secured and on the 16 March C Company, 6/29th Artillery was placed there along with the remainder of Company A 3/8th and the 3/8th headquarters.

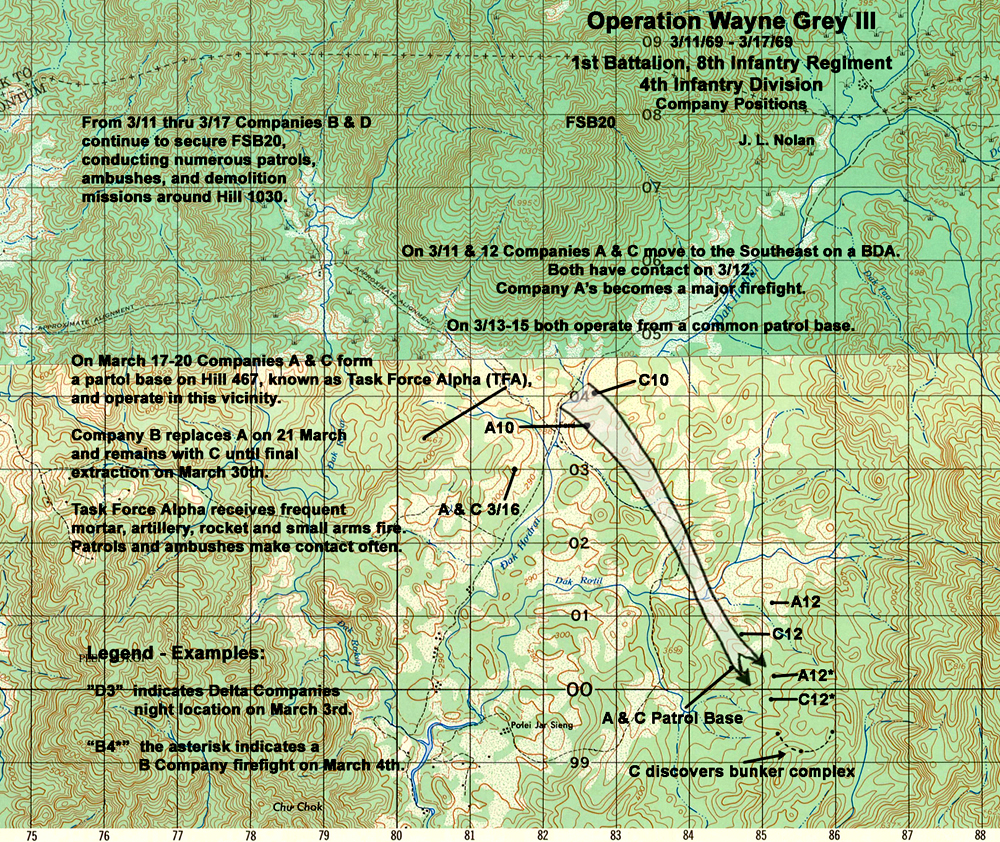
OP Wayne Grey Movements III

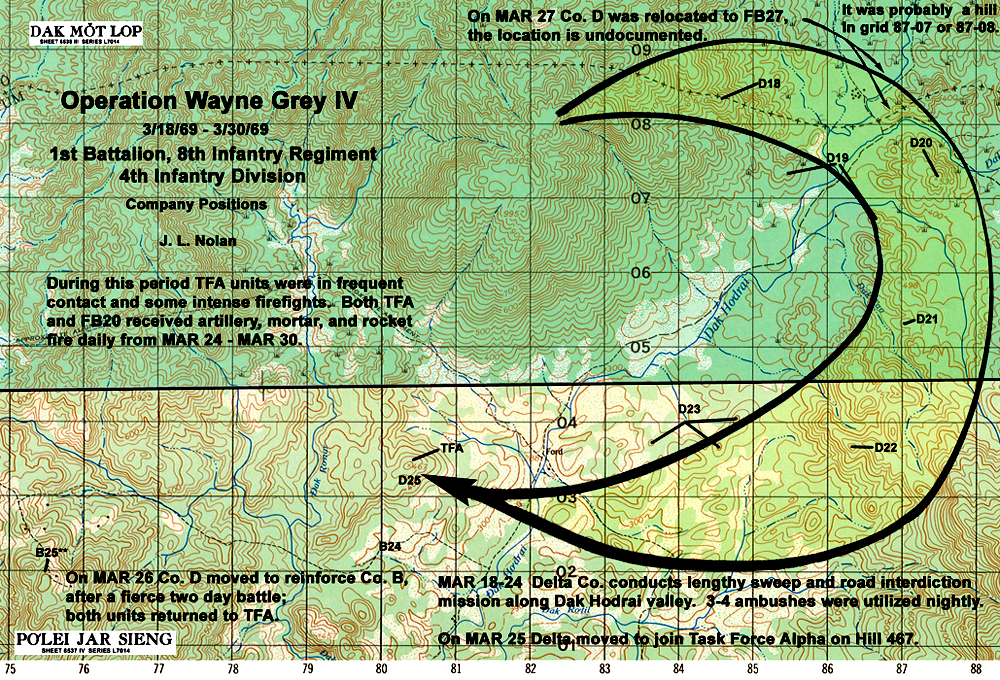
OP Wayne Grey Movements IV

Hill 947 (14.337°N 107.604°E) was established on 3 March by D Company, 3/8th Infantry to block PAVN retreating from LZ Brace. The position was attacked several times between the 3rd and the 8th of March as well as being under constant mortar and artillery fire. D Company was successful in holding the hill against PAVN attacks and by the afternoon of 8 March, the PAVN gave up trying to take the position.

On 7 March D Company moved overland to Firebase 20 to assist B Company in patrols to help patrol Hill 1030. A and C Companies continued operations along the Plei Trap road.

Between the 10th and 14 March, Task Force Swift consisting of B and D Companies, 3/12th along with a reconnaissance platoon, consolidated on Hill 947. On the 11th, Swift came into contact with a PAVN company and pulled back to their perimeter to call in B-52 airstrikes; they were again shelled by mortar fire. The next day they assaulted and took the PAVN position.

On 17 March A & C Companies formed a new patrol base out of Hill 467 from which to conduct joint patrols along the PAVN lines of communication and halted the flow of supplies to the 40th Artillery.

== Phase II ==
=== Task Force Alpha ===
After A and C Companies had located and destroyed a PAVN force to the south of Hill 467 they reorganised into Task Force Alpha on 17 March. Their mission was to establish company size blocking positions between their base at Hill 467 and Firebase 20, with the aim of cutting off supplies and reinforcements of PAVN in the area. Cratering charges were also used to stifle operations along the Plei Trap road by rendering it impassable to vehicles. Operations continued in the area until 30 March, the PAVN employed mortar and artillery against the 4th Division's firebases in the area and sent propaganda leaflets urging U.S. soldiers to surrender. Task Force Alpha was extracted on 30 March.

=== Cu-Don Mountain ===
Cu-Don was a known PAVN base situated on a ridgeline south of LZ Brace and was suspected to be the withdrawal point of the PAVN 66th Infantry. The mission for the 3/12th was to block and harass the PAVN from retreating. On 14 March A and C Companies along with a recon platoon, assaulted into LZ Cider (14.278°N 107.617°E) to secure it as a firebase for B Battery, 6/29th artillery. D Company secured LZ D-Handle (14.33°N 107.609°E) for placement of 4.2" mortars and B Company moved overland to a patrol base at YA818856 (14.328°N 107.612°E). Heavy contact was made on 18 March when D Company came into contact with a complex of PAVN bunkers. Contact was broken and artillery and mortars were called in. The next day the position was saturated by artillery fire and gunships all day. On the 20th, D Company attempted to assault the bunkers with the aid of artillery and air support, but were beaten off by the defenders. D Company fell back to LZ D-Handle. On the 22nd after a heavy artillery barrage D Company seized the hill without any opposition. On the 27th A Company had contact near LZ Cider and were forced to break contact after taking mortar fire and suffering casualties. They were forced to leave their wounded. When they attempted to retrieve their missing men the next day, they again were forced to retreat back to LZ Cider under mortar fire. B Company was attacked at their ambush site by B-40 rockets and D Company at LZ D-Handle were attacked by sapper units who managed to destroy two bunkers with rocket fire; the attack was eventually repelled with artillery fire. On the 30th, A Company again tried to retrieve its missing. They succeeded, but were forced to retreat again when the PAVN deployed mortars. A Company withdrew and linked with C Company to secure a night location. The location was then subsequently bombarded by multiple B-52 strikes.

After the 3/12th withdrew, the 1st Battalion, 22nd Infantry Regiment was assaulted to LZ Cider and YA806827 (14.302°N 107.601°E) on 2 April. Their objective was to secure "Target Red", the bunker complex that had forced A Company, 3/12th to retreat. The position was saturated by artillery and gunship fire while the 1/22nd conducted recon of the target under heavy fire. The 1/22nd was extracted on 13 April and the remainder of the 3/12 on 14 April.

== Aftermath ==
Operation Wayne Grey concluded on 14 April. The 1st Brigade, 4th Division inflicted heavy casualties on the PAVN 24th and 66th Infantry Regiments and their supporting elements. While the PAVN was able to retreat back into Cambodia, Operation Wayne Grey was considered a success as it prevented any immediate attack against Kontum from materialising.

=== Location of captured artillery ===
According to witnesses of the assault, namely a Lieutenant Nolan and Captain Yamashita they believed that the mission took place over the border in Cambodia and not in Vietnam as the after action report and map coordinates say. They explained how the men of D Company were not given the coordinates of their landing zone or their usual maps, but instead black and white topographic maps that required extensive training to read. This coupled with the fact that D Company was in the air for a lot longer than would they would have normally been for a flight of that distance and significant differences in the terrain, the map said they were on a hill when they were not, then what the map showed, added to Nolan and Yamashita's suspicions. Eight days after D Company recaptured the artillery pieces and about halfway through the operation, U.S. Strategic Air Command began its secret bombing campaign against Cambodia.
