= Bitner =

Bitner is a surname. Notable people with the surname include:

- David Bitner (1948–2011), American politician
- Jason Bitner, American author and project producer
- Lili Bitner, American politician
- Marta Bitner (born 1991), Polish actress
- Richard Bitner (born 1966), American author

== See also ==
- Maria Bitner-Glindzicz (1963–2018), British doctor
- Bittner
