= Bittner =

Bittner (occupational name for a cooper or a barrel maker, the name was derived from the Old German word "bute," which means "cask") is a surname. Notable people with the surname include:

- Egon Bittner (1921–2011), American sociologist
- Eric R. Bittner (born 1965), American scientist
- Horst Bittner (1927–2016), German politician (SED)
- Jason Bittner (born 1970), American drummer
- John Joseph Bittner (1904–1961), American cancer biologist
- Julius Bittner (1874–1939), Austrian composer
- Maria Bittner, American linguist
- Mark Bittner (born 1951), American writer
- Pavel Bittner (born 2002), Czech cyclist
- Sławomir Maciej Bittner (1923–1944), Polish resistance fighter
- Stephan Bittner, German canoeist

== See also ==
- Biittner, surname
- Bitner, surname
