= Bütner =

Bütner or Butner is a German surname. Notable people with the surname include:

- Bo Butner (born 1974), American drag racer
- Cory Butner (born 1981), American bobsledder
- Crato Bütner (1616–1679), German Baroque composer
- Frank Butner Clay (1921–2006), American Army major general
- Henry W. Butner (1875–1937), American Army general
