= Theodora Büttner =

East German historian

Theodora Büttner (born Theodora Reichel; 17 June 1930) is a retired East German historian. For many years she was a professor at the Karl Marx University (as it was known at the time) in Leipzig. Much of her own research was focused on the precolonial history of Africa and on the anti-colonial liberation movements.

== Life ==
Theodora Reichel was born in Thum, a small former mining town in the hills south of Chemnitz. Her mother worked in retailing and her father was employed as a businessman. She attended school locally between 1936 and 1949, by which time she had lived through the Second World War (1939–1945) and the region of Germany in which she grew up had come to be administered as the Soviet occupation zone (1945–1949). Between 1949 and 1953 she studied successfully for a degree in History, English studies and Pedagogy at the teacher training section ("Lehramt") of the University of Leipzig.

Between 1946 and 1953 she was a member of the Free German Youth ("Freie Deutsche Jugend" / FDJ) which was in effect the youth wing of the Socialist Unity Party ("Sozialistische Einheitspartei Deutschlands" / SED), a new political party, launched under contentious circumstances in April 1946 and, by the time the German Democratic Republic was founded in October 1949, well on its way to becoming the ruling party in a new kind of German one-party dictatorship. In 1953, the year of her twenty-third birthday, she herself became a member of the SED. It was also in 1953 that she was appointed an assistant at the university's Philosophy (including other "humanities") Institute.

She received her doctorate from Leipzig in 1957. Her dissertation concerned the socio-religious Circumcellion movement. During this period she was employed as a research assistant (1954–1961) and then as a senior research assistant (1961–1965) in the Middle Ages Department at the Institute for General History of Leipzig University. Her habilitation (higher academic degree)), which concerned the socio-economic structure of Adamawa Region during the nineteenth century, opened the way for a successful academic career. In 1966 she obtained a teaching post in African History at the Leipzig University Africa Institute. In 1968 she was appointed a full professor for African History at the Africa Institute, and in 1969 further promotion followed as she was given a post covering the Africa and Middle East section, but her own work continued to focus on Africa.

From 1988 till 1992 Theodora Büttner was a corresponding member of the German Academy of Sciences at (East) Berlin. She retired in 1992.

== Personal ==
Theodora Büttner was married to (Kurt) Hermann Büttner (1926–1999) who was, like her, an Africa specialist in the Leipzig University History department.

== Output ==
- Theodora Büttner: "Die sozialreligiöse Bewegung der Circumcellionen (Agoniten)", in: Hellmut Kretzschmar: Vom Mittelalter zur Neuzeit: Zum 65. Geburtstag von Heinrich Sproemberg. Rütten & Loening, Berlin 1956 (Forschungen zur mittelalterlichen Geschichte, Band 1).
- Theodora Büttner. Die Circumcellionen, eine sozial-religiöse Bewegung, Leipzig 1957, Dissertation Universität Leipzig, 14. September 1957.
- Theodora Büttner, Ernst Werner: Circumcellionen und Adamiten, 2 Formen mittelalterlicheb Haeresie, Akamedmie-Verlag, Berlin 1959 (Forschungen zur mittelalterlichen Geschichte, Band 2).
- Thea Büttner: Die sozialökonomische Struktur Adamauas im 19. Jahrhundert, Leipzig 1965, (Habilitationsschrift Leipzig University 11. Juni 1965).
- Theodora Büttner, ed. (1971), Revolution und Tradition. Zur Rolle der Tradition im antiimperialistischen Kampf der Völker Afrikas und Asiens.: Materialien eines Symposiums der Sektion Afrika- und Nahostwissenschaft, Karl-Marx-Universität Leipzig, und der Sektion Orient- und Altertumswissenschaft, Martin-Luther-Universität Halle, vom 10. – 11. November 1969. (in German), Leipzig: Karl-Marx-Universität
- Theodora Büttner (Hrsg.): Geschichte Afrikas, 4 Bände, Akademie-Verlag, Berlin / Pahl-Rugenstein, Köln, 1976 bis 1984 (die 2. Auflage Köln 1985 unter dem Titel: Afrika: Geschichte von den Anfängen bis zur Gegenwart):
  - Teil 1: Thea Büttner: Afrika von den Anfängen bis zur territorialen Aufteilung Afrikas durch die imperialistischen Kolonialmächte 1976, 1985, ISBN 3-7609-0433-5.
  - Teil 2: Heinrich Loth: Afrika unter imperialistischer Kolonialherrschaft und die Formierung der antikolonialen Kräfte, 1884–1945 1976, 1985, ISBN 3-7609-0436-X
  - Teil 3: Christian Mährdel u.a.: Afrika vom Zweiten Weltkriege bis zum Zusammenbruch des imperialistischen Kolonialsystems. 1983, 1985, ISBN 3-7609-0437-8.
  - Teil 4: Tea Büttner: Afrika vom Zusammenbruch des imperialistischen Kolonialsystems bis zur Gegenwart. 1984, 1985, ISBN 3-7609-0438-6.
- Thea Büttner, Albin Kress (Hrsg.): African studies = Afrika Studien Akademie-Verlag, Berlin 1990. ISBN 3-05-000625-0 (Studien über Asien, Afrika und Lateinamerika, Band 40).
