= Henry W. Butner =

United States Army general

Henry Wolfe Butner
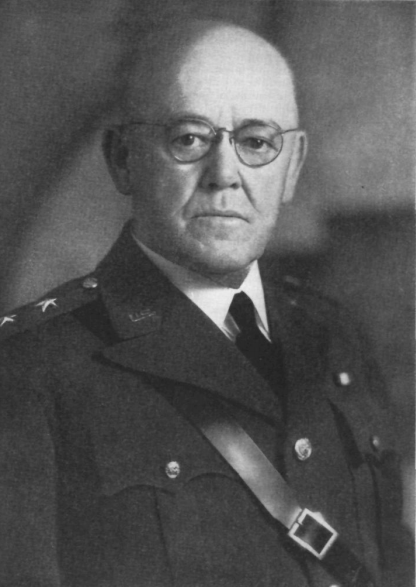
- Born: April 6, 1875; Pinnacle, North Carolina, U.S.
- Died: March 13, 1937 (aged 61); Washington, D.C., U.S.
- Military career
- Allegiance: United States
- Branch: United States Army
- Service years: 1898–1937
- Rank: Major general
- Service number: 0-332
- Commands: 1st Field Artillery Brigade; 24th Field Artillery Regiment; Fort Eustis; Fort Bragg; Panama Canal Department
- Conflicts: World War I
- Awards: Army Distinguished Service Medal; Silver Star Citation; Croix de Guerre with Palm

Henry Wolfe Butner (Note: His middle name is spelled "Wolf" in some sources.) (April 6, 1875 – March 13, 1937) was a United States Army general in World War I and onetime commanding officer of Fort Bragg (1928–29). A native of North Carolina, Butner graduated in the top half of the United States Military Academy Class of 1898. He became an artillery officer and was sent to France with the American Expeditionary Force during World War I. In the last month of the war Butner commanded an artillery brigade after promotion to brigadier general. After attending the United States Army War College, he led the United States Army Field Artillery School, the 24th Field Artillery Regiment, Fort Bragg, and Fort Eustis. Promoted to major general in early 1936, Butner took command of the Panama Canal Department. He suffered a stroke while golfing in late 1936, and died at Walter Reed Army Hospital in March 1937.

== Early life ==
Henry Wolfe Butner was born in the Pinnacle community of Surry County, North Carolina on April 6, 1875, to Francis Augustine and Sarah Wolfe Butner. He came from a family rich in military tradition, including service in both the American Revolution and the Civil War. Butner attended the Davis Military School near Winston-Salem before taking the entrance exam at West Point in June 1894. He graduated 18th of 109 in the West Point class of 1898. Butner received the rank of second lieutenant upon his graduation.

== Military career ==
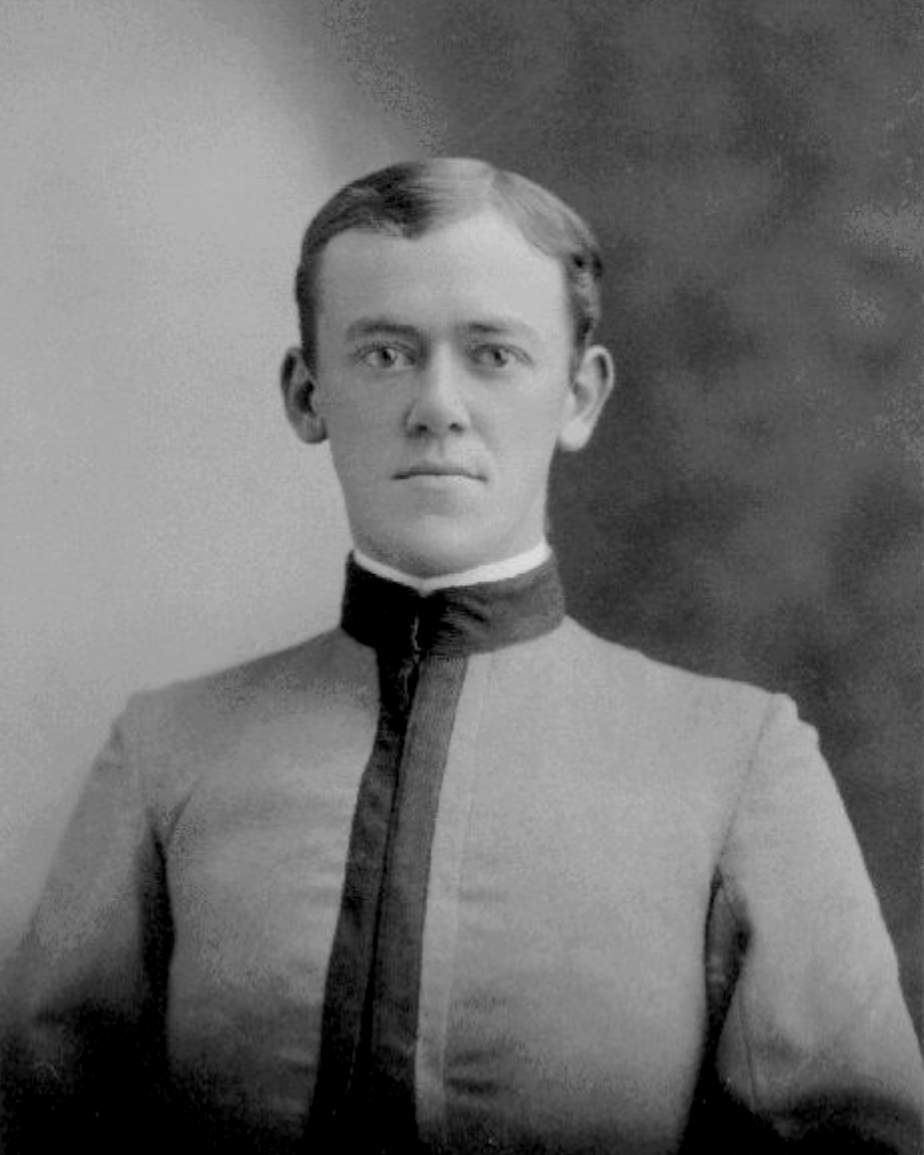
At West Point in 1898

Butner was sent to the 3rd Artillery Regiment's Battery E, stationed at Fort Point, San Francisco. He served with the unit from May 29 to December 8, 1898. He was transferred to the Presidio on December 8, and on January 28, 1899, to Alcatraz Island. In the spring of that year Butner transferred to Fort Baker. In June, Butner transferred to the regiment's Battery F. On July 1, he was reassigned to Fort Riley and the regiment's light battery. On July 1, 1900, Butner was transferred to the 6th Battery, Field Artillery. He stated at Fort Riley until December 4, when he became commander of a recruit detachment and was sent to Cuba. On February 2, 1901, he was promoted to first lieutenant. Butner returned to the United States on February 5, 1901, and was sent back to the 6th Battery. Butner was promoted to captain on September 23.

On October 24, 1901, Butner became commander of the 122nd Company of the Coast Artillery at Fort Columbus. The unit moved to Key West Barracks on October 4, 1902. Butner was sent to the Staff College at Fort Leavenworth on July 13, 1905, graduating on July 26, 1906. He became a camp instructor at Fort Riley, and on September 29 transferred to Fort Flagler. In 1907, Butner returned to the Field Artillery and on July 19 became adjutant of the 2nd Field Artillery Regiment at Fort D.A. Russell. On February 10, 1909, the regiment began its transfer to Fort McKinley. Butner also served at Camp Gregg, Camp Stotsenburg, and Manila while in the Philippines until April 14, 1911. In May 1911, he became commander of the 2nd Artillery's F Battery at Vancouver Barracks. On September 10 he became a student at the School of Fire, attending it until February 25, 1912. Butner became quartermaster of the Fort Leavenworth Military Prison, being stationed there until December 11. He transferred to Fort Riley and became commander of D Battery there.

On April 20, 1914, Butner was detached to lead a battery in Brownsville, Texas. He served at Leon Springs, Texas from August 14 to November 13. He returned to Brownsville and was stationed there until May 17, 1915. From then to August 6, Butner was at Laredo, Texas. From August 6 to October 28, he was at Nogales, Arizona. Between October 28 and November 25, Butner served at Douglas, Arizona. He returned to Nogales from November 25 to December 10, then went back to Douglas until November 2, 1916. On July 1, 1916, he was promoted to major. He was ordered to Hawaii and stationed at Schofield Barracks.

He was promoted to lieutenant colonel on May 15, 1917, a few weeks after the American entry into World War I. Butner, promoted on August 5 to the temporary rank of colonel, returned from Schofield Barracks on December 14. He served with the 16th Field Artillery Regiment at Fort Sill. Butner and his regiment began their voyage to France on May 21, 1918. Between August 5 and 17, Butner fought in operations on the Vesle front. He participated in the Battle of Saint-Mihiel between September 2 and 13. On October 1, he became a temporary brigadier general and took command of the 1st Field Artillery Brigade. The brigade supported I Corps in the Battle of Saint-Mihiel. Between October 1 and November 9, he led the brigade in the Meuse-Argonne Offensive. Butner was commander of the brigade until November 12, a day after the Armistice with Germany. He was sent to the Coblenz Bridgehead with the Third Army for occupation duties, arriving on December 15. On May 26, 1919, Butner returned to the United States.

On July 15, Butner reverted to his permanent rank of lieutenant colonel. On September 28, he became a colonel. After World War I, Butner attended the U.S. Army War College and graduated in June 1920. He became assistant commandant of the Field Artillery School at Fort Sill. On July 1, 1922, Butner became commandant of the school. On January 3, 1923, he became assistant commandant of the school again. On July 3, 1924, Butner transferred to Fort Bragg and became commander of the 5th Field Artillery Regiment. On August 15, 1925, he was ordered to the Philippines, arriving at Camp Stotsenburg on December 15. Butner became commander of the 24th Field Artillery, Philippine Scouts. He commanded the regiment until December 5, 1927.

Butner was sent back to the United States and became president of the Field Artillery Board at Fort Bragg in February 1928. At the same time, he commanded the 13th Field Artillery Brigade. Between 1928 and 1929, he commanded Fort Bragg. On March 7, 1930, he became a brigadier general. On March 29, 1930, Butner transferred to the Air Corps Tactical School. From April 26, he was a student at the Coast Artillery School at Fort Monroe. On May 24 he became commander of Fort Eustis, a post he held until August 4. Butner was transferred to Hawaii to lead the 11th Field Artillery Brigade at Schofield Barracks from October 24. Butner remained commander until October 4, 1932. On October 10, 1932, he returned to the United States and became commander of the 3rd Field Artillery Brigade at Fort Lewis. After August 1, 1934, he became commandant of the Field Artillery School. Butner also commanded the 4th Field Artillery Brigade for most of this time. On February 1, 1936, he was promoted to major general. In July 1936, he became commander of the Panama Canal Department, which was his last command.

== Awards ==
He received the Army Distinguished Service Medal in 1920 for his actions in World War I in command of the 1st Field Artillery Brigade. The citation for the medal reads:

The President of the United States of America, authorized by Act of Congress, July 9, 1918, takes pleasure in presenting the Army Distinguished Service Medal to Brigadier General Henry Wolf Butner, United States Army, for exceptionally meritorious and distinguished services to the Government of the United States, in a duty of great responsibility during World War I. General Butner commanded, with marked distinction, the 1st Field Artillery Brigade from 18 August to 11 November 1918, displaying at all times keen tactical ability, initiative, and loyal devotion to duty. By his high military attainments and sound judgment he proved to be a material factor in the successes achieved by the divisions whose advances he supported.

Butner was also awarded the Silver Star Citation for "distinguished conduct during operations at Mouzen, and subsequent advance on Sedan, November 5–7, 1918." He was also awarded the French Croix de Guerre, with Palm.

== Death and legacy ==
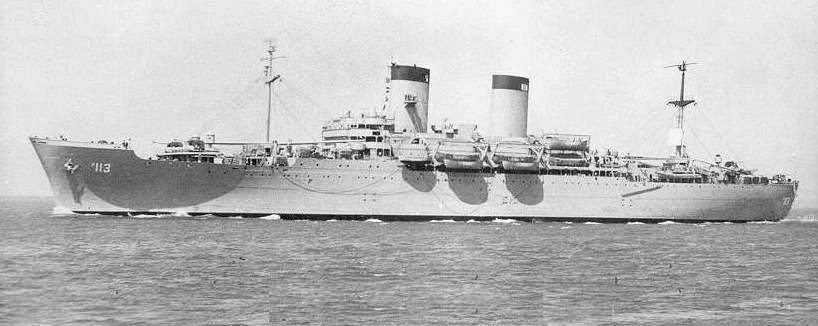
USS General H. W. Butner (AP-113), launched in 1944

Butner had a slight stroke while playing golf in December 1936, and was sent to Walter Reed Army Hospital, where he died on March 13, 1937. Butner was buried in Arlington National Cemetery.

In 1944, a ship was named after him. Camp Butner near Durham, North Carolina—today the site of the town of Butner, North Carolina—was named for him.
