= Maria Bittner =

American linguist

Maria Bittner is Professor Emerita in Linguistics at Rutgers University.

She is a fieldworker, semanticist, and logician whose work has focused on tense and cross-linguistic typology. She is best known for her descriptive and theoretical work on the Greenlandic language Kalaallisut, for which she has done some text documentation. She has long combined linguistic fieldwork, and to analyze her data she developed a compositional dynamic update logic, building on DRT and Centering Theory, but with a novel architecture. She has also worked on the phenomena of case, questions, and causatives.

Bittner received her PhD from the University of Texas at Austin in 1988 and spent 30 years at Rutgers University before retiring in 2018.

== Publications (selected) ==
- Bittner, Maria. 1994. Case, scope, and binding. Springer. ISBN 978-94-011-1412-7
- Bittner, Maria. 2014. Temporality. Wiley-Blackwell. ISBN 978-1405190398
