= Polei Kleng Camp =

Former US Army and ARVN base in Vietnam

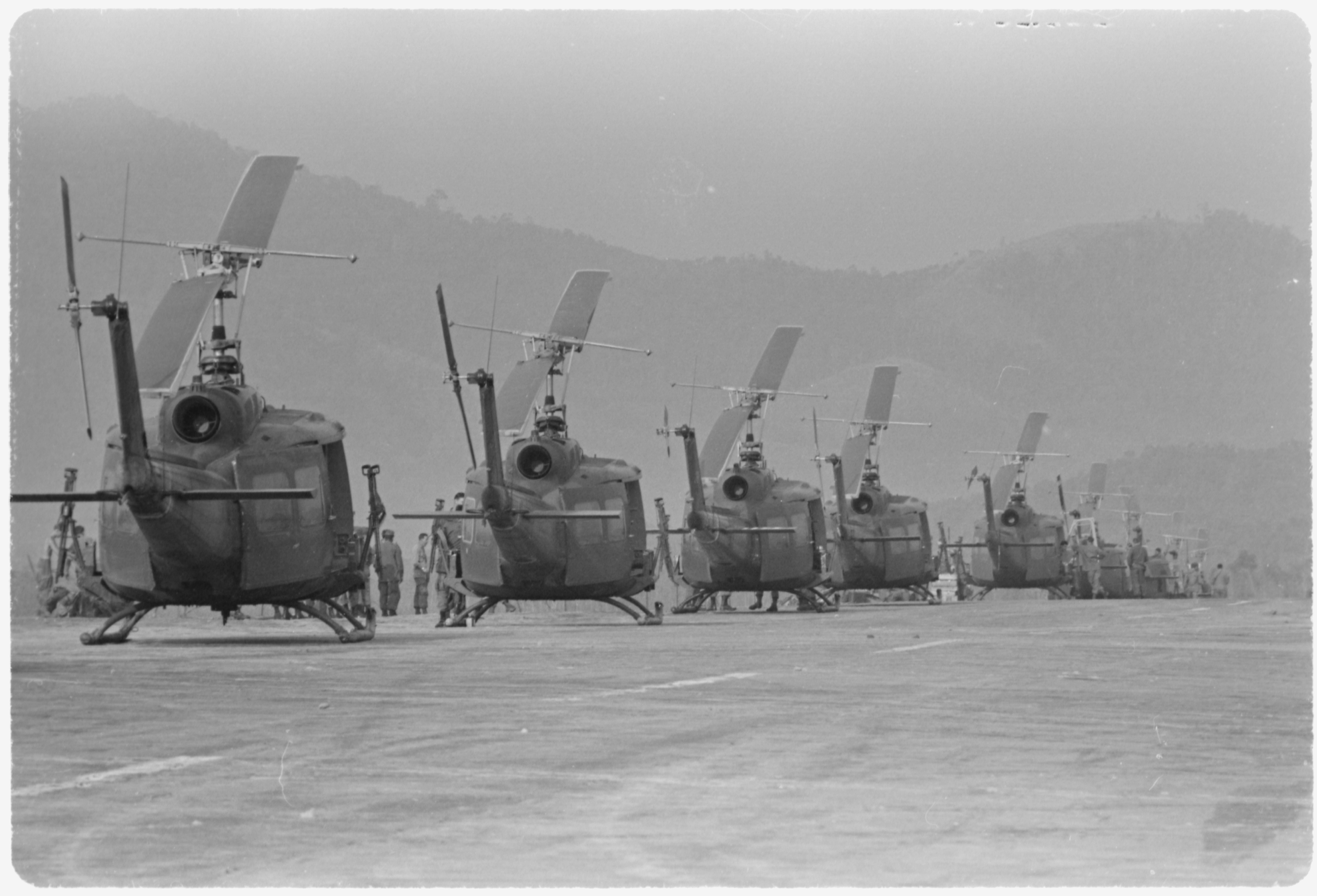
- Helicopters of the 170th and the 189th Helicopter Assault Companies, await the loading of troops at Polei Kleng, 04/10/1969

Site information
- Type: Army Base

Location
- Coordinates: 14.397°N 107.804°E

Site history
- Built: 1966
- In use: 1966-72
- Battles/wars: Vietnam War; Battle of Kontum

Garrison information
- Occupants: 5th Special Forces Group; Vietnamese Rangers

Airfield information
- Identifiers: IATA: none, ICAO: none
- Elevation: 570 metres (1,870 ft) AMSL
Runways
Direction	Length and surface
	3,500 metres (11,483 ft) PSP

Polei Kleng Camp (also known as Camp Le Vanh, Firebase Bass, Landing Zone Bass or Polei Kleng Special Forces Camp) is a former U.S. Army and Army of the Republic of Vietnam (ARVN) base west of Kontum in the Central Highlands of Vietnam.

== History ==
The base was established in June 1966 approximately 16 km west of Kontum by the 5th Special Forces Group, Detachment A-241.

In March–April 1969 the base was used as a staging base for Operation Wayne Grey an operation against the People's Army of Vietnam (PAVN) 24th and 66th Regiments in the Plei Trap Valley.

The base was transferred to the ARVN 62nd Border Rangers in August 1970.

In May 1972 during the Battle of Kontum after overrunning the ARVN bases at Tân Cảnh, Đắk Tô and the Firebases along Rocket Ridge the PAVN turned their attention to the base and to Ben Het Camp which blocked the avenues for attack on Kontum. The base had been subjected to artillery fire since 24 April, but from midday on 6 May the volume of fire increased dramatically with over 500 rounds systematically destroying the base bunkers and an infantry assault by the PAVN 64th Regiment penetrated the perimeter. At 19:00 the two U.S. advisers at the base were evacuated by helicopter. The attack was repulsed and the ARVN continued to hold for a further 3 days during which time U.S. airpower, including gunships and 16 Boeing B-52 Stratofortress strikes, was concentrated on the attacking PAVN. On the night of 7 May the PAVN attempted another assault but were again repulsed suffering 300 killed. On the morning of 9 May the ARVN abandoned the base in the face of a PAVN tank and infantry assault, only 97 ARVN and their dependents reaching safety in Kontum.

== Current use ==
The base has reverted to housing and farmland, the airfield is still visible on satellite images. The former landing strip has now been incorporated into a street.
