= Butner, North Carolina =

- Town
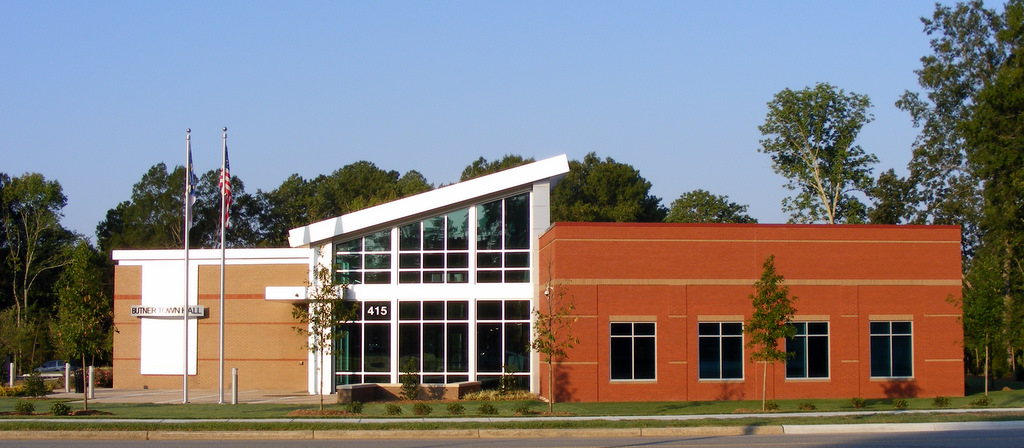
- Butner Town Hall

- Seal

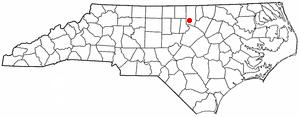
- Location of Butner, North Carolina
- Coordinates: 36°07′43″N 78°45′00″W
- Country: United States
- State: North Carolina
- County: Granville
- Founded: 1942
- Incorporated: November 1, 2007
- Named for: Henry W. Butner

Area
  - Total: 14.05 sq mi (36.39 km^{2})
  - Land: 14.03 sq mi (36.33 km^{2})
  - Water: 0.023 sq mi (0.06 km^{2})
- Elevation: 361 ft (110 m)

Population (2020)
  - Total: 8,397
  - Density: 598.7/sq mi (231.15/km^{2})
- Time zone: UTC-5 (Eastern (EST))
  - Summer (DST): UTC-4 (EDT)
- ZIP code: 27509
- Area code: 919
- FIPS code: 37-09360
- GNIS feature ID: 2424932
- Website: butnernc.org

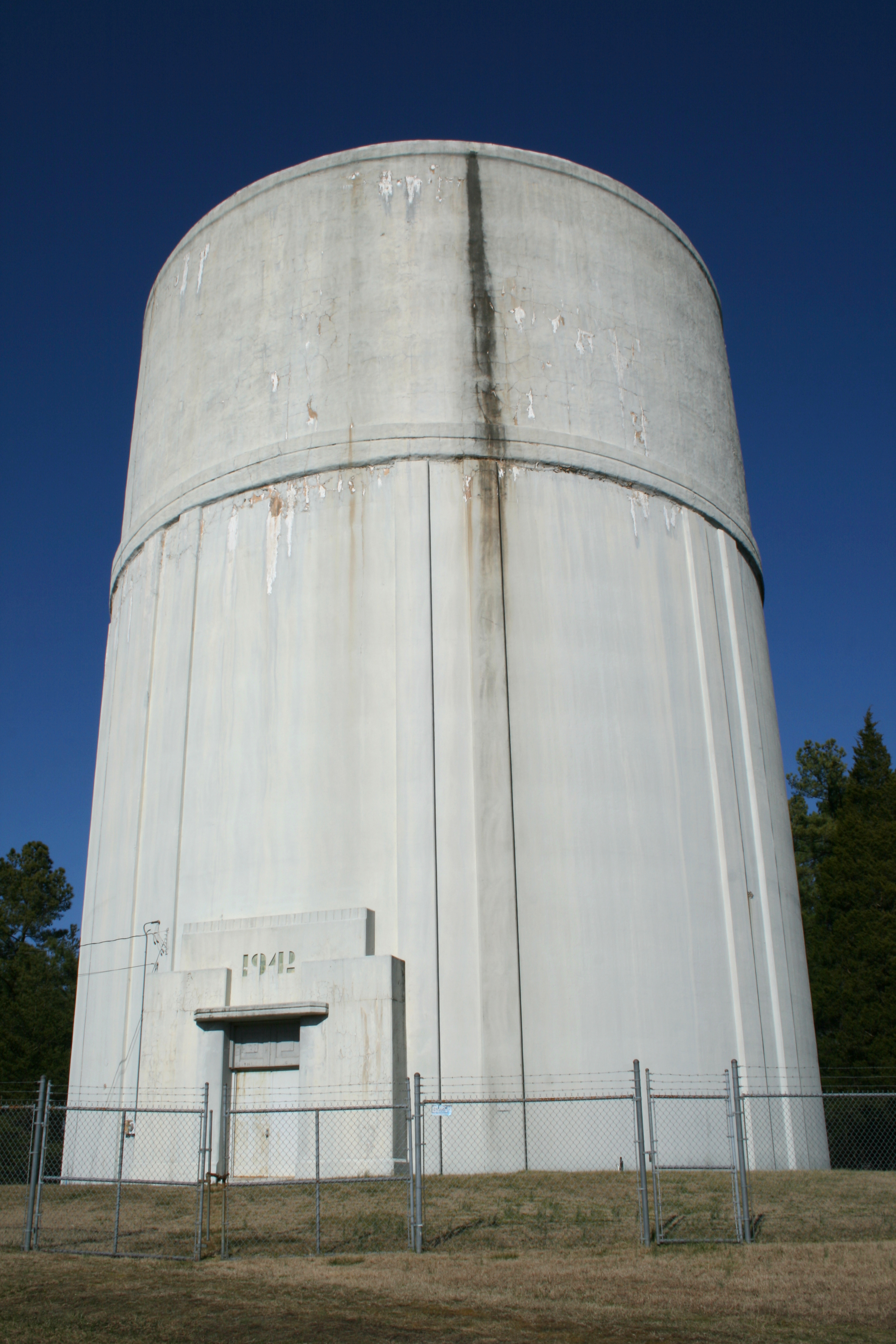
A 1940s-era water tower in Butner

Butner is a town in Granville County, North Carolina, United States. The population was 8,397 as of the 2020 census. Butner was managed by the state of North Carolina from 1947 through 2007.

== History ==
The area eventually comprising the town of Butner was originally land along the Occaneechi Path, a Native American trade route. Following the arrival of European settlers, it became a rural community populated by farmers.

In August 1941, the U.S. federal government beginning planning for the development of a U.S. Army military facility in the area, motivated partly by its proximity to a rail line. Planning hastened following the Pearl Harbor attack and the United States' subsequent entry into World War II in December. Beginning in January 1942, the government purchased 40,000 acres of predominantly agricultural land in southern Granville County through eminent domain, displacing approximately 400 to 500 families. Construction commenced in March of 1942 and Camp Butner officially opened in August. The site was named for Major General Henry W. Butner (1875–1937), a North Carolina native.

The primary intent of Camp Butner was the training of combat troops to be deployed to the European and Pacific theaters. The site also notably housed thousands of Axis prisoners of war, including Italians and Germans captured across the European theater, as well as forced laborers of other nationalities who were initially captured by Nazi Germany and forced to fight under their flag. Ideological reeducation initiatives at the camp included academic courses in geography, history, and politics.

By April 1946, activity at the facility had declined significantly and it was officially closed in January 1947.

Following the camp's closure, its land was divided up among the U.S. War Assets Administration, the North Carolina National Guard, the state of North Carolina, and the dispossessed farmers who had once lived in the area. The state converted its former infirmary into a psychiatric hospital. A civilian community subsequently developed around the hospital's new workforce. Some former camp facilities were retained by the residents for their own use such as its recreation center and churches, others were repurposed as homes, and some were demolished so their materials could be used in new construction. The state government assumed responsibility for governance in the town and provided police and firefighting services. Overall authority rested with State Board of Mental Health while most mundane administrative decisions were executed by the hospital's business manager. In the early 1970s, control of the town passed to the North Carolina Department of Human Resources.

In 2003, a seven-member elective Butner Advisory Council was created to advise the North Carolina Secretary of Health and Human Services on governance of the town. Following legislation passed by the North Carolina General Assembly, Butner became an incorporated community effective November 1, 2007 and the advisory council was turned into a town council. The town assumed responsibility for local police and firefighting services from the state in 2013.

== Institutions ==
The area surrounding Butner is home to a number of medical and correctional facilities, including:

- Camp Butner Training Center (Run by the North Carolina National Guard, consisting of roughly 5,000 acres)
- Federal Correctional Complex, Butner (4 units and one medical center, consisting of Camp Butner for males only, FCI Butner Low, FCI Butner Medium I, FCI Butner Medium II, and Federal Medical Center, Butner)
- Granville Correctional Institution, a facility of the North Carolina Department of Correction
- C.A. Dillon Youth Development Center, a juvenile facility of the North Carolina Department of Public Safety
- Several facilities of the North Carolina Department of Health and Human Services (DHHS):
  - Murdoch Developmental Center
  - Whitaker School
  - Central Regional Hospital (CRH), the state's largest inpatient psychiatric hospital. Opened in 2008 to replace outdated facilities at the nearby John Umstead Hospital in Butner as well as Dorothea Dix Hospital in Raleigh.
- UNC Youth Behavioral Hospital, opened in 2023 as a partnership between UNC Health and DHHS

== Geography ==
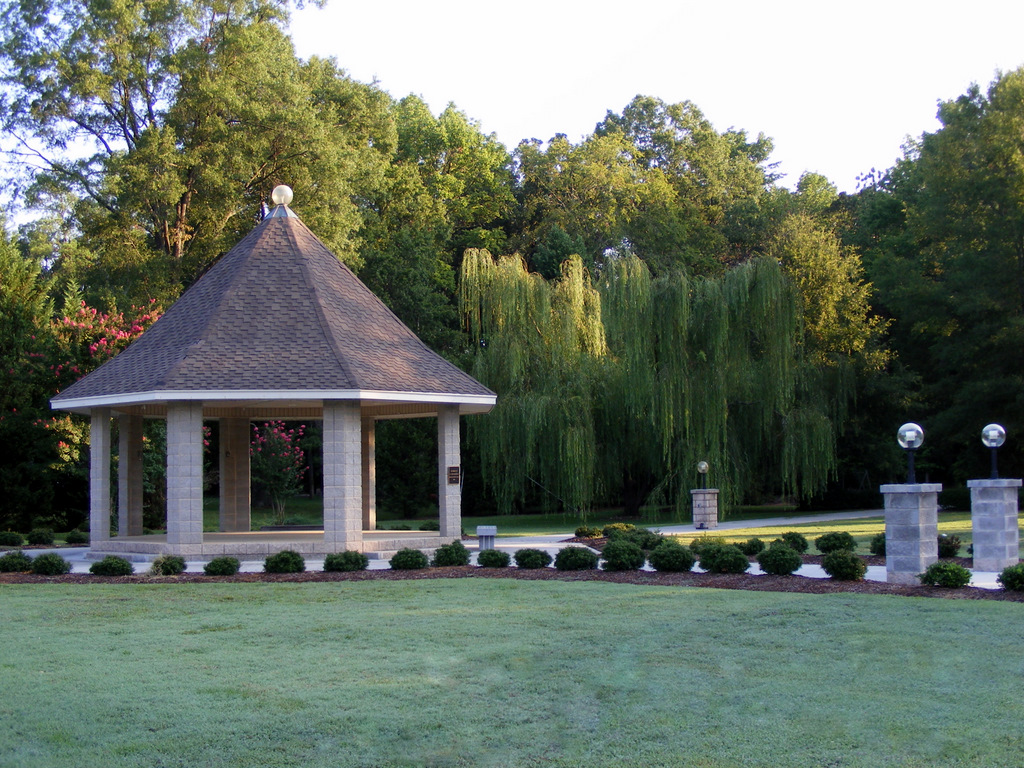
Gazebo Park

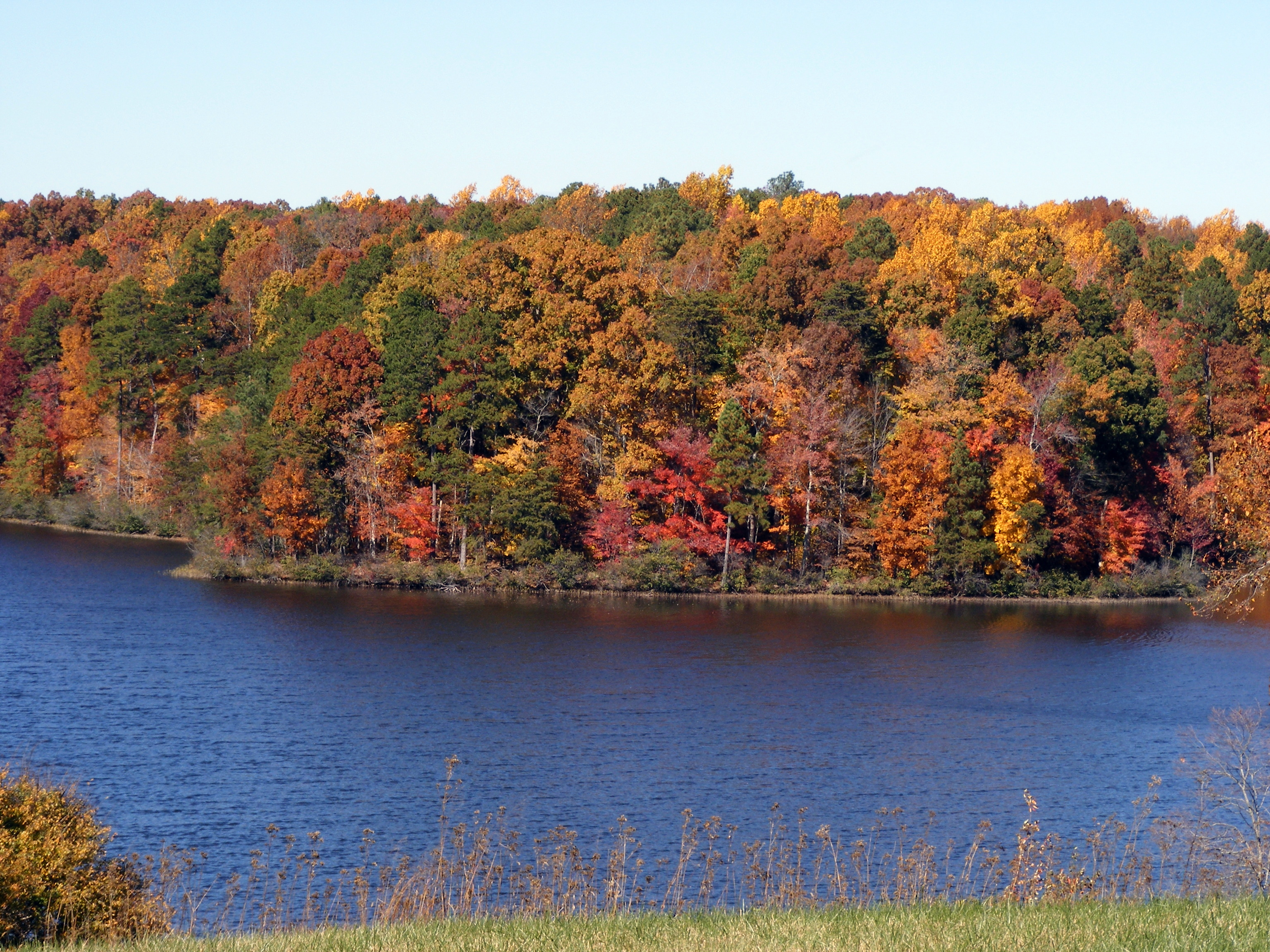
Lake Holt

Butner is located in southwestern Granville County. Interstate 85 passes through the town, southeast of the town center, with access from Exits 186, 189, and 191. I-85 leads northeast 16 miles (26 km) to Oxford, the Granville County seat, and southwest 13 miles (21 km) to Durham. Butner is bordered to the east by the city of Creedmoor.

According to the United States Census Bureau, the town has a total area of 13.9 square miles (36.1 km^{2}), of which 0.02 square miles (0.06 km^{2}), or 0.18%, is water. The town's layout is heavily influenced by the original development of Camp Butner. Central Avenue serves as the community's main street, and many other streets in the town are named with numbers and letters.

== Demographics ==
Historical population
| Census | Pop. | Note | %± |
|---|---|---|---|
| 1970 | 3,538 | | — |
| 1980 | 4,240 | | 19.8% |
| 1990 | 4,679 | | 10.4% |
| 2000 | 5,792 | | 23.8% |
| 2010 | 7,591 | | 31.1% |
| 2020 | 8,397 | | 10.6% |
| 2022 (est.) | 8,566 | ▲ | 2.0% |
U.S. Decennial Census

=== 2020 census ===
Butner racial composition
| Race | Number | Percentage |
|---|---|---|
| White (non-Hispanic) | 3,421 | 40.74% |
| Black or African American (non-Hispanic) | 2,663 | 31.71% |
| Native American | 27 | 0.32% |
| Asian | 46 | 0.55% |
| Pacific Islander | 2 | 0.02% |
| Other/Mixed | 324 | 3.86% |
| Hispanic or Latino | 1,914 | 22.79% |

As of the 2020 census, Butner had a population of 8,397. There were 2,982 households and 2,022 families residing in the town. The median age was 36.5 years. 23.5% of residents were under the age of 18 and 14.1% were 65 years of age or older. For every 100 females, there were 106.8 males, and for every 100 females age 18 and over, there were 105.9 males age 18 and over.

27.1% of residents lived in urban areas, while 72.9% lived in rural areas.

Of all households, 35.7% had children under the age of 18 living in them. 41.4% were married-couple households, 18.4% were households with a male householder and no spouse or partner present, and 33.4% were households with a female householder and no spouse or partner present. About 29.0% of all households were made up of individuals, and 12.5% had someone living alone who was 65 years of age or older.

There were 3,112 housing units, of which 4.2% were vacant. The homeowner vacancy rate was 1.2%, and the rental vacancy rate was 4.6%.

=== 2010 census ===
As of the census of 2010, there were 7,591 people in 2,767 households. The population density was 1,150.2 inhabitants per square mile (444.1/km^{2}). There were 2,999 housing units at an average density of 454.4 per square mile (175.4/km^{2}). The racial makeup of the town was 59.5% White, 30.1% African American, 0.7% Native American, 0.8% Asian, 6.5% from other races, and 2.3% from two or more races. Hispanic or Latino of any race were 14.7% of the population.

There were 2,767 households, out of which 33.0% had children under the age of 18 living with them. The average household size was 2.74. In the town, the population was spread out, with 26.0% under the age of 18, 7.6% from 18 to 24, 13.8% from 25 to 34, 23.3% from 35 to 49, 18.8% from 50 to 64, and 10.4% who were 65 years of age or older. For every 100 females, there were 97.3 males.

The median income for a household in the town was $45,437, and the mean income for a household was $51,466. The median and mean incomes for families were $53,186 and $55,847, respectively. The per capita income for the town was $17,654. About 4.1% of families and 13.5% of the population were below the poverty line, including 9.2% of those under age 18 and 12.8% of those age 65 or over.
