= Richard Bitner =

American author and publisher

- Born: October 23, 1966 (age 59); Los Angeles, California, US
- Education: Northern Arizona University Cornell University
- Occupations: Author, Publisher of HousingWire magazine
- Notable credit(s): President, The LTV Group
- Children: 2
- Website: http://theltvgroup.com/about/culture/richard-bitner

Richard Bitner (born 1966 in Los Angeles) is an American author and publisher in the mortgage loan industry. He is the publisher of HousingWire magazine, a real estate publication.

== Career ==
A subprime lender, Bitner collaborated with mortgage brokers from 2000 to 2005. Bitner and his friends started a mortgage business, Plano-based Kellner Mortgage Investments, in September 2000. Kellner was funded through a $175,000 mortgage on his parents' home. They hoped to aid people who lacked the financial standing to receive loans, and in the process, gain profits after those people became homeowners. Each year, the company loaned $250 million to people. After closing loans, the company would sell them to larger lenders, including Countrywide Financial.

=== Books ===
In his 2008 book, Confessions of a Subprime Lender, he discussed how their salutary aims were overridden by a hunger for financial gain. Brokers "gamed the system", using poor criteria to grant loans. Bitner believed that many people were accepting loans they could not pay off. Bitner exited from his company in 2005 because he felt uncomfortable about the daring loans. The two friends with whom he started the company purchased his shares because they wished to gradually, instead of immediately, close the company. His former company failed in 2007, one of the many casualties during the numerous defaults early that year. Julian Delasantellis of Asia Times Online wrote in a review of the book that "Bitner is admirable in that he is willing to take a measure of blame onto himself, when so many others are flailing about furiously trying to do the opposite, but I still think he judges himself somewhat harshly."

Bitner self-published the 2008 book Greed, Fraud & Ignorance: A Subprime Lender's Look at the Mortgage Collapse to reveal his story about the 2007 mortgage collapse. Newsweek said that his book "conveys the authority of someone who was in the trenches where this dirty work was going on".

Harry Smith of CBS News interviewed Bitner in February 2009 after Bitner published Confessions of a Subprime Lender.

== Personal life ==
Bitner attended Northern Arizona University, where he earned an undergraduate degree in public relations. He also attended Cornell University, where he earned a master's degree in communication. He earned both degrees through a scholarships in debate and public speaking.

Bitner is married and has two children.
