= Kurt Büttner =

German entomologist

Kurt Büttner (14 February 1881, Leipzig - 1 April 1967, Zwickau) was a German entomologist who specialised in Heteroptera.

Kurt Büttner was also a physician.

== Works ==
Partial list

- Büttner, K. and Wetzel C (1904): Die Heteropterenfauna Westsachsens. Faun. Abh. Staatl. Mus. Tierkund. Dresden, H. 2, : 59–100.
- Büttner, K. (1964): Beiträge zur Zikadenfauna von Westsachsen. Veröff. Naturk.-Mus. Zwickau 4, Sonderh. 2: 3-23.
- Büttner, K. (1959): Die Tierwelt des Naturschutzgebietes Wulmer Hang bei Zwickau Veröff. Naturkundemus. Zwickau 3, Sonderh. 1: 1-40.

His collections of Heteroptera, Coleoptera and Hymenoptera from Saxony are in the Staatliches Museum für Tierkunde Dresden
