= USS General H. W. Butner =

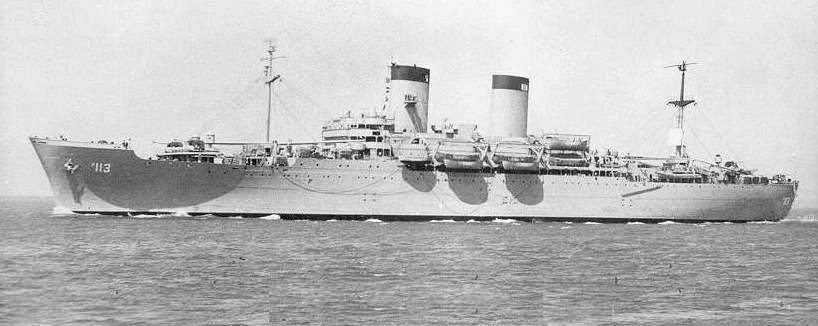
- USS General H. W. Butner (AP-113) underway

History

United States
- Name: USS General H. W. Butner
- Namesake: General Henry W. Butner (1874–1937)
- Builder: Federal Shipbuilding & Drydock
- Launched: 19 September 1943
- Sponsored by: Mrs John J. McCloy
- Acquired: 5 December 1943
- Commissioned: 11 January 1944
- Decommissioned: 28 January 1960
- Reclassified: AP-113 to T-AP-113, October 1949
- Identification: MC hull type P2-S2-R2, MC hull no. 671
- Honors and awards: Two service stars for the Korean War
- Fate: Scrapped in Taiwan, 1977

General characteristics
- Class & type: General John Pope-class transport
- Type: troopship
- Displacement: 11,450 tons (lt); 20,175 tons fully laden
- Length: 622 feet 7 inches (189.76 m)
- Beam: 75 feet 6 inches (23.01 m)
- Draft: 25 feet 6 inches (7.77 m)
- Installed power: 17,000 shp
- Propulsion: 2 steam turbines, reduction gearing, twin screw
- Speed: 19 to 20.6 knots (35.2 to 38.2 km/h) (sources vary)
- Capacity: 5,289
- Complement: 477
- Armament: 4 x single 5"/38 caliber dual purpose guns, 4 x quad 1.1" guns, 20 x single 20mm guns

USS General H. W. Butner (AP-113), named for Henry W. Butner, was a troopship that served with the United States Navy in World War II and the Korean War. She was redesignated T-AP-113 in October 1949.

General H. W. Butner was launched by the Federal Shipbuilding & Drydock Company of Kearny, New Jersey, 19 September 1943 under United States Maritime Commission contract for the Army; acquired by the Navy 5 December 1943; placed in ferry commission the same day for transfer to the Maryland Drydock Company of Baltimore, for conversion to a troop transport; and placed in full commission 11 January 1944.

== World War II ==
After shakedown in Chesapeake Bay, General H. W. Butner sailed 23 February 1944 from Norfolk, Virginia carrying troops to Morocco. Arriving Casablanca 3 March, the ship returned to Norfolk for another load of troops, and sailed again for Casablanca, arriving back at Norfolk 20 April.

After only three days in port General H. W. Butner sailed again, this time eastward to the West Coast. Her ports of call on this long voyage were Durban, South Africa; Bombay; Melbourne, Australia; and San Pedro, Los Angeles, where she arrived 1 July. The transport then retraced her steps to Melbourne and Bombay, arriving off the Indian coast 26 August. From there she returned to Melbourne with troops and sailed for California via Nouméa and Efate, New Hebrides. She arrived in San Pedro 6 October 1944.

Continuing the vital work of ferrying troops to and from the Pacific Theater, General H. W. Butner departed San Pedro 21 October 1944, called at Melbourne, Bombay, Sydney, and Nouméa, and returned to San Pedro 7 January 1945. Departing San Francisco 17 February, she brought troops to Finschafen, Hollandia, Leyte, Manus Island, Guadalcanal, and many other islands, as the amphibious advance through the Pacific reached its final phase.

She returned to San Francisco 12 May, departed 20 May for the Panama Canal, and from there steamed to Le Havre, France. The far-ranging transport departed France with troops 12 June, and arrived back in Norfolk 20 June. Thus she completed a circuit of the earth, though, in the meantime, she had steamed a distance equal to six times its diameter while supporting wartime operations.

General H. W. Butner made one more voyage before the end of the Pacific war, redeploying troops from the European Theater. She sailed from Marseille 7 July, via the Panama Canal, for Ulithi and Eniwetok, finally arriving Okinawa 1 September. She then returned to the United States, arriving Seattle 24 September.

=== After hostilities ===
The ship also served as a troopship in the occupation of Japan, leaving San Francisco 5 January 1946 she made four voyages carrying troops to the Pacific stopping at Yokohama, Shanghai, Qingdao, and other ports in support of US efforts to stabilize the China situation and to occupy Japan.

== Postwar service ==
She sailed for Boston from California early in 1947 for conversion to a combination dependent and troop transport, emerging 28 June and returning to San Francisco. In the next two years she operated in the Pacific between Guam and San Francisco, carrying dependents and servicemen to stations in the Far East. Transferred to the Military Sea Transportation Service (MSTS) under Navy captain and crew in October 1949, she departed for Norfolk via the Panama Canal and Bermuda, arriving 10 January 1950. She then operated in the Caribbean until 11 April, when she departed for San Diego, California. General H. W. Butner arrived San Diego 24 April, and on 10 May made another Pacific cruise which lasted until her return to the West Coast 12 June.

== Korean War ==
Before the month ended, the Korean War broke out, and General H. W. Butner was one of the handful of ships immediately available. She promptly returned to Guam with vitally needed troops; returned to the West Coast for more troops; and headed for Japan, arriving Yokohama 31 August to prepare for the Inchon landing. This daring amphibious operation took the communist troops by surprise and forced them to abandon the ground they had taken in South Korea and to retreat north across the 38th Parallel. Arriving off the beach 16 September, troopship General H. W. Butner landed her troops in this important action, and then departed for Japan. The last day of the year saw her depart from Okinawa for San Francisco.

In 1951 the ship continued to sail from California to Yokohama and Guam in support of the UN war effort in Korea until she left San Francisco for Galveston, Texas, 29 June.

== Later service ==
From there the ship continued to Bremerhaven, Germany, and thence to New York, mooring 5 September 1951. In the following months she carried troops and dependents to the Mediterranean and back, then departed for the Pacific again 19 February 1952. Transiting the Panama Canal from New York, she arrived at Yokohama 19 March, and 3 days later began the long trip back to Panama. From the Canal Zone, General H. W. Butner sailed to La Pallice, France, and to Bremerhaven, where she embarked passengers for New York.

General H. W. Butner began a regular schedule from Brooklyn, New York, to Southampton and Bremerhaven soon afterward, supporting American military commitments in Europe. Except for occasional visits to the Mediterranean (June 1953 and September–October 1959) and to the Caribbean (November 1956 and November 1958) she continued this run until decommissioning.

Delivered transport from Bremerhaven Germany, arriving at port of New York, NY 6 March 1953.

== Decommission ==
General H. W. Butner was decommissioned 28 January 1960 at Bayonne. She was turned over to the Maritime Administration (MARAD), and in March 1960 entered the National Defense Reserve Fleet, berthed in the James River, Virginia.

She was sold for scrap for $604,050 to Luria Brother and Co. on 17 November 1976, and scrapped in Taiwan the next year.

== Awards ==
General H. W. Butner received two service stars for Korean War service.
