= Camp Butner =

US Army installation in North Carolina during World War II

Coordinates: 36.184165°N 78.799953°W

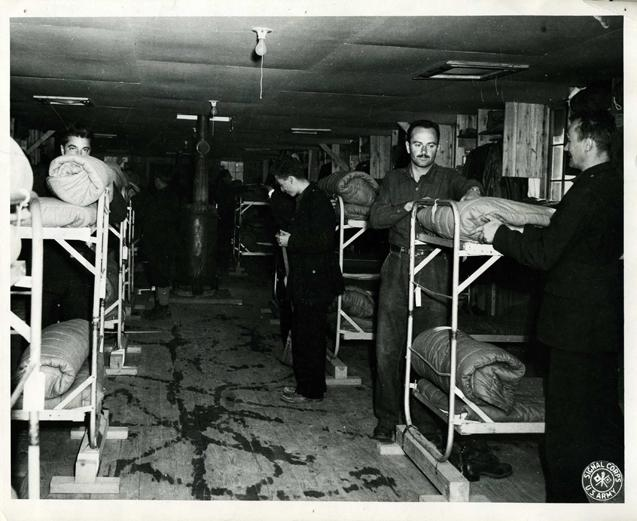
Italian POWs at Camp Butner during World War II

Camp Butner was a World War II era United States Army installation in what subsequently became Butner, North Carolina. It was named after Army general and North Carolina native Henry W. Butner. Part of it was used as a POW camp for German internees, and the site eventually became the Federal Correctional Complex, Butner. The camp site was chosen in the late summer of 1941 to become a major training area, with construction starting in January 1942. In just six months over 1,700 buildings were constructed. There were enough beds in the enlisted barracks alone to accommodate over 35,000 soldiers.

Several major US Army divisions, including the 35th Infantry Division, 78th Infantry Division, and 89th Infantry Division, used the camp as a staging area to assemble and organize prior to being deployed to both the European and Pacific theaters of the war.

After the war, the camp was used as a major facility for the demobilization and inactivation of Army units returning from combat. Among the units inactivated at the camp were the 3d Infantry Regiment and the 4th Infantry Division.

The Camp was also the location of the Battalion Surgeon's Assistant school, and had a convalescent hospital for wounded troops that operated much like Walter Reed Hospital does today.

== Current use ==
Camp Butner Training Center is currently under North Carolina Army National Guard ownership. Since 2005 it has played host to the Civilian Marksmanship Program's Eastern Junior Highpower Clinic & Championship, taught by the United States Marine Corps Mobile Marksmanship Unit. Its 1000-yard range, designated Range 4, is frequently host to a variety of shooting matches, including those sponsored by the Civilian Marksmanship Program (CMP), and the National Rifle Association of America (NRA). The CMP's Eastern Games and Creedmoor Cup are held annually at Camp Butner, lasting two weeks.

A museum dedicated to the soldiers, civilians and prisoners of war who spent time at the camp from 1942 to 1946 is operated by the 501(c)(3) nonprofit Camp Butner Society, and currently housed in the sports arena on 24th Street that was built with the rest of the camp in 1942. The Society has the last remaining wooden structure of its type original to Camp Butner, set to house the museum following extensive fundraising and restoration.
