= USS Admiral W. L. Capps =

United States Navy transport ship

Coordinates: 23°35′01″N 159°50′00.2″W

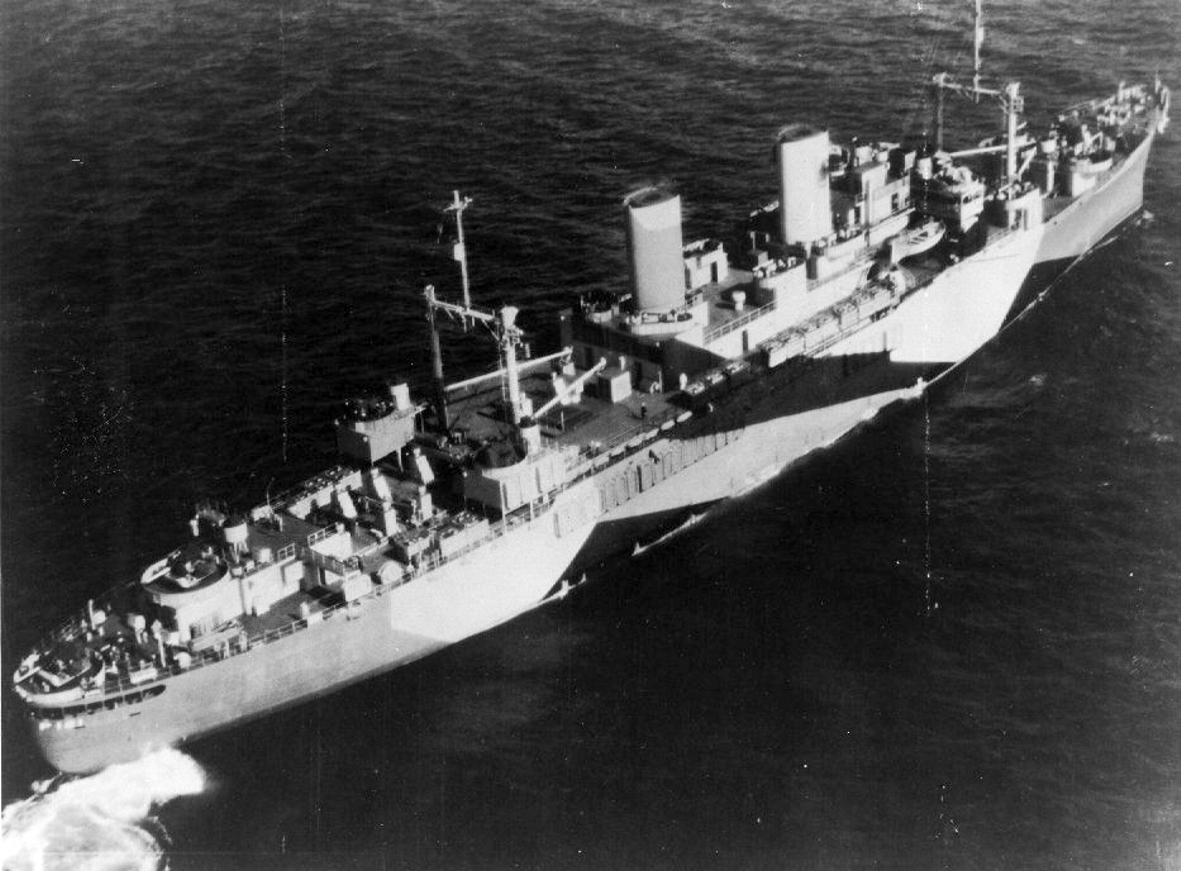
- USS Admiral W. L. Capps (AP-121) in San Pedro Bay, California painted with dazzle camouflage.

History

United States
- Name: USS Admiral W. L. Capps (AP-121)
- Namesake: Admiral Washington Lee Capps, USN (1864–1935)
- Builder: Bethlehem-Alameda Shipyard Inc., Alameda, California
- Laid down: 15 December 1942
- Launched: 20 February 1944
- Sponsored by: Mrs. James Reed
- Acquired: 18 September 1944
- Commissioned: 18 September 1944
- Decommissioned: 8 May 1946
- Identification: IMO number: 8643092
- Renamed: USAT General Hugh J. Gaffey
- Namesake: General Hugh J. Gaffey, US Army
- Renamed: USNS General Hugh J. Gaffey (T-AP-121), 1 March 1950
- Stricken: 9 October 1969 and 25 October 1993
- Reinstated: 1 November 1978 as barracks hulk IX-507
- Fate: Expended as a target 16 June 2000

General characteristics
- Class & type: Admiral W. S. Benson-class transport
- Displacement: 9,676 tons dockside; 20,120 tons fully laden
- Length: 608 feet 11 inches (185.60 m)
- Beam: 75 feet 6 inches (23.01 m)
- Draft: 26 feet 6 inches (8.08 m)
- Installed power: 19,000 shp
- Propulsion: turbo-electric transmission, twin screw
- Speed: 19 knots (35 km/h)
- Capacity: 100,000 cubic feet (2,800 m^{3}) of cargo
- Troops: 5,200
- Complement: 618 officers and enlisted
- Armament: 4 × 5"/38 caliber gun mounts; 8 × twin Bofors 40 mm gun mounts; 14 × twin Oerlikon 20 mm cannon gun mounts

USS Admiral W. L. Capps (AP-121), an Admiral W. S. Benson-class transport, was the second ship of the United States Navy to be named for Rear Admiral Washington L. Capps (1864–1935). Unusually, the first — USS Capps (DD-550) — served concurrently with the Admiral W. L. Capps. Via a transfer to the United States Army and then back to the Navy, the ship was renamed USNS General Hugh J. Gaffey (T-AP-121), making her the only ship to be named for Hugh Joseph Gaffey.

== Built in California ==
Her keel was laid down on 15 December 1942 at Alameda, California, by the Bethlehem-Alameda Shipyard Inc., Inc., under a Maritime Commission contract (MC hull 679). She was launched on 20 February 1944 sponsored by Mrs. James Reed and delivered to the Navy and commissioned on 18 September 1944.

== World War II Service ==
=== Transporting troops for Pacific campaigns ===
Following shakedown training along the U.S. West Coast, the transport departed San Francisco, on 23 November, bound for the southwestern Pacific Ocean. En route (7 December) she visited Nouméa, New Caledonia, where she disembarked marines and took on board passengers headed for Guadalcanal, arriving 10 December. From that island, Admiral W. L. Capps carried another group of passengers to Espiritu Santo. She embarked almost 3500 troops at the latter port and set a course for home where she arrived on the day after Christmas.

The ship put to sea again on 21 February 1945 bound for Hollandia, New Guinea, whence she proceeded to the Philippines. The ship arrived at Leyte on 20 March and departed that island on 8 April for the United States.

After arriving at San Francisco, late that month, she moved north to Seattle, Washington, where she embarked almost 5000 troops to reinforce American units fighting on Okinawa. Sailing on 7 May, the transport stopped at Pearl Harbor, Eniwetok, and Ulithi before reaching Okinawa on 2 July. Next she visited Saipan on 12 and 13 July, before getting underway on the latter day bound ultimately for the Panama Canal and the East Coast of the United States.

=== Supporting Atlantic operations ===
Admiral W. L. Capps entered port at Norfolk, Virginia, on 4 August and, while undergoing voyage repairs, received word at mid-month that hostilities in the Pacific had ended. She stood out of Norfolk on 1 September, with members of the French Navy among her passengers. After dropping them off at Marseille, France, and embarking American troops, she headed back toward the United States and arrived in Norfolk on 20 September.

Five days later, the ship once more set out for the Mediterranean Sea, this time to repatriate some 3765 former Italian prisoners of war. After stopping at Naples and Marseille, she returned to Newport News, Virginia, on 19 October. Between that time and mid-December, the ship made two more round-trip voyages to France and back, one to Le Havre and the other to Marseille, returning American servicemen home.

=== End-of-war operations ===
On 29 December, she put to sea to return to the Pacific. At Pearl Harbor, the transport embarked troops and continued her voyage west on 16 January 1946. She disembarked one group of passengers at Yokosuka, took on almost 4700 more, and headed for Seattle on 30 January. In March, the ship made a round-trip voyage from the U.S. West Coast to Okinawa, returning to San Francisco with over 4800 troops. In April, she moved from the west coast to New York City which she reached on 24 April.

On 8 May 1946, Admiral W. L. Capps was decommissioned and returned to the Maritime Commission. Her name was struck from the Naval Vessel Register in June 1946.

== Post-war service ==
The Maritime Commission transferred the ship to the United States Army which named her USAT General Hugh J. Gaffey. She served the Army Transport Service until 1 March 1950 when the Navy re-acquired her. Retaining her Army name, the transport was not re-commissioned, but instead was assigned to the Military Sea Transportation Service and manned by a civil service crew. USNS General Hugh J. Gaffey (T-AP-121) spent almost two decades carrying men and material to American installations throughout the Far East and the Pacific Ocean. Transported troops and accompanying families to and from overseas assignments in Guam, Japan, Korea, Taiwan and Okinawa.

== Korean and Vietnam War support ==
She supported American troops in the Korean War in the early 1950s and performed similar service in the Vietnam War in the mid-1960s. On 4 November 1968, General Hugh J. Gaffey was transferred to the Maritime Administration on a temporary basis to be laid up with the National Defense Reserve Fleet facility at Suisun Bay, California.

On 31 August 1969 she was transferred permanently to Maritime Administration custody. Her name was again struck from the Naval Vessel Register on 9 October 1969.

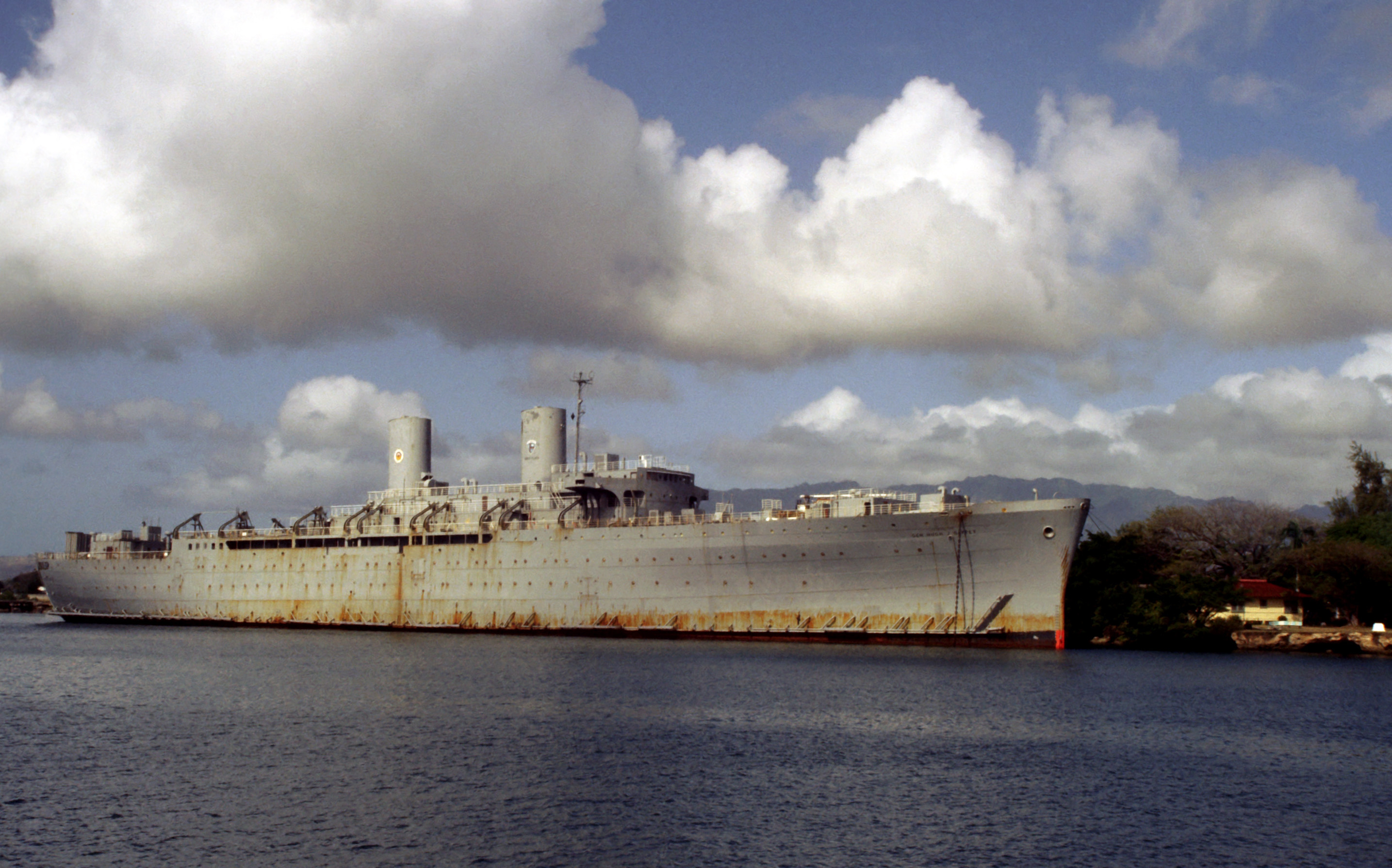
Barracks ship General Hugh J. Gaffey (IX-507) at Pearl Harbor, in 1987.

== Service as a barracks hulk ==
In 1978 the transport was reacquired by the Navy a second time and her name reinstated on the Naval Vessel Register. Redesignated an unclassified miscellaneous vessel, IX-507, General Hugh J. Gaffey was placed in service in November 1978 at Bremerton, Washington, to serve as a barracks ship for the crews of ships undergoing major overhaul.

== Fate ==
The transport was sunk in RIMPAC 2000 EXERCISE as a missile target, 16 June 2000, position: 023° 35' 01.0" North, 159° 50' 00.2" West, depth: 2,730 fathoms

== Awards ==
- American Campaign Medal
- Asiatic-Pacific Campaign Medal
- European-African-Middle Eastern Campaign Medal
- World War II Victory Medal
- Navy Occupation Medal with "ASIA" clasp
- National Defense Service Medal with star
- Korean Service Medal
- Vietnam Campaign Medal with one campaign star
- United Nations Korea Medal
- Korean War Service Medal (Korea)
