= Ray Barker =

US Army general

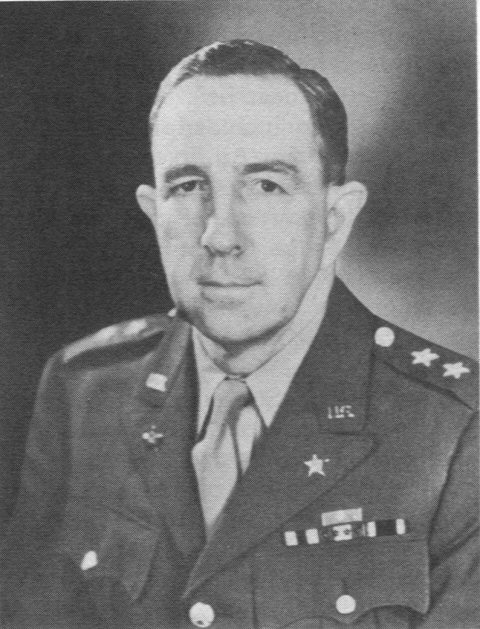
- Born: December 10, 1889; Elmira, New York, U.S.
- Died: June 28, 1974 (aged 84); Fort Bragg, North Carolina, U.S.
- Burial place: Arlington National Cemetery, Virginia, U.S.
- Military career
- Allegiance: United States
- Branch: United States Army
- Service years: 1910–1946
- Rank: Major General
- Service number: 0-3611
- Units: Cavalry Branch; Field Artillery Branch
- Commands: 31st Field Artillery Regiment; 30th Field Artillery Regiment; 78th Infantry Division; U.S. Sector Berlin
- Conflicts: Pancho Villa Expedition; World War I; World War II
- Other work: Head of The Manlius School, Manlius, New York

Major General Ray Wehnes Barker (December 10, 1889 – June 28, 1974) was a United States Army officer of the Allied Forces, and served in the European Theater of Operations during World War II. Barker was a key member of the combined United States-British group, which became known as COSSAC (Chief of Staff to the Supreme Allied Commander). This group planned the Battle of Normandy, codenamed "Operation Overlord", also known as D-Day, which liberated Nazi-occupied France. He served as the Deputy Chief of Staff of the European Theater from 1943 to 1944, and Deputy Chief of Staff for Supreme Headquarters Allied Expeditionary Force (SHAEF).

== Early and military professional life ==
Ray Barker was born in Elmira, New York and enlisted in the Army first serving with the 15th Cavalry from 1910 to 1913. He was commissioned as an officer in the cavalry in 1913, later participating in the Punitive Expedition into Mexico (Pancho Villa Expedition) from 1916 to 1917. Thereafter, he transferred to the field artillery and accompanied the 13th Field Artillery to France in World War I. He served in the Marne-Vesle and Meuse-Argonne offensives.

In 1928, he graduated from the Command and General Staff School, and in 1940 from the Army War College.

He was the commanding officer of 31st Field Artillery from June 1940 to April 1941. He commanded the 30th Field Artillery from June 1941 until April 1942. After promotion to brigadier general in July 1942, he later became the Deputy Chief of Staff, G-5, of the European Theater from 1943 to 1944, and Deputy Chief of Staff for Supreme Headquarters Allied Expeditionary Force. He was promoted to major general in June 1943. In January 1946 he assumed command of the 78th Infantry Division, headquartered in Berlin, succeeding Major General Edwin P. Parker Jr. He was commander supervising demilitarization of Germany until the deactivation of the 78th in May 1946 (see: commandants of Berlin American Zone). General Barker retired from the military in February 1947.

== Contributions to Overlord ==
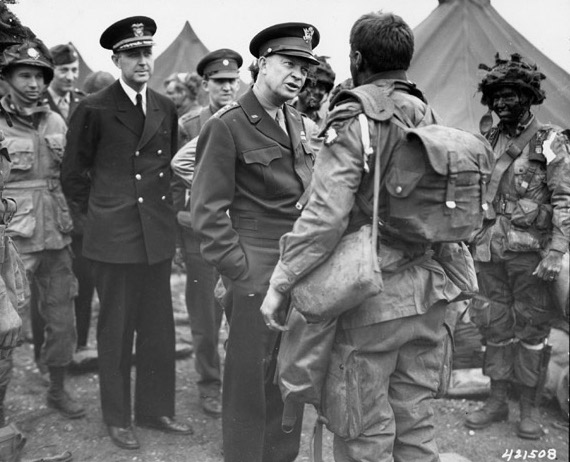
Major General Ray Barker standing to the left of General Dwight Eisenhower as he speaks to airborne troops, England, United Kingdom, 5 Jun 1944

Two of Barker's notable actions in the Overlord planning involved maintaining American involvement when significant disagreements arose between Americans and British military planners, which could have resulted in withdrawal of America support for the operation.

While Overlord was planned, the expected amount of enemy resistance after aerial and naval bombardment was unclear. Overlord initially stated the land invasion in France could not succeed against more than twelve divisions of enemy troops; Barker predicted this would make the invasion unpalatable and risk American opposition. Barker's concern was correct and lead to opposition from the Joint Chiefs in America. After further discussion and clarifications from Barker, the America government's support was accomplished.

Tensions between Americans and British governments again arose due to how involved a battlefield commander should be in such an invasion, particularly when a multi-national force is commanded by a single battlefield commander. Barker as the acting Chief of Staff to the Supreme Allied Commander, was able to solidify agreement between the countries of how this should be handled.

== Decorations ==
His decorations included the Distinguished Service Medal, Legion of Merit, Bronze Star Medal, and Soldier's Medal.

Army Distinguished Service Medal
Legion of Merit
Soldier's Medal
Bronze Star Medal
Mexican Service Medal
World War I Victory Medal with four battle clasps
Army of Occupation of Germany Medal
American Defense Service Medal
American Campaign Medal
European-African-Middle Eastern Campaign Medal with four service stars
World War II Victory Medal
Army of Occupation Medal
Order of the Red Banner (Union of Soviet Socialist Republics)

== Negotiations ==
In 1945, Barker, as the SHAEF Assistant Chief of Staff for Personnel (G-1), was the officer responsible for recovery of Allied POWs.

Between 16 and 22 May 1945, Major General Barker and Lieutenant General Konstantin Golubev, representing the Soviet repatriation authority, met at Halle, Germany, to discuss the repatriation of Soviet citizens and American and British POWs. The general principles agreed to at Yalta provided the framework for the Halle discussions. With respect to the return of western Allied prisoners, the Halle meeting centered on working out the administrative details for the prompt release and return to SHAEF control of British and American POWs, using available air or motor transport.

Despite the seemingly straightforward nature of this problem, the Soviet side cited practical and administrative obstacles and tied rapid release of American, British, and other Allied POWs to repatriation of all Soviet prisoners and displaced persons in the West, many of whom, especially military collaborators, did not want to return to the Soviet Union. The conferees finally reached agreement on a plan in the early morning hours of 22 May. They finalized delivery and reception points for each side, transportation plans, daily transit capacities of each of the reception-delivery points, and other details. Barker and Golubev signed the Halle Agreement on 22 May 1945. However, most Americans liberated by the Red Army in central Germany and along the Baltic coast, had been exchanged by local arrangement prior to implementation of the Halle Agreement on 23 May.

== Post army career – The Manlius School ==
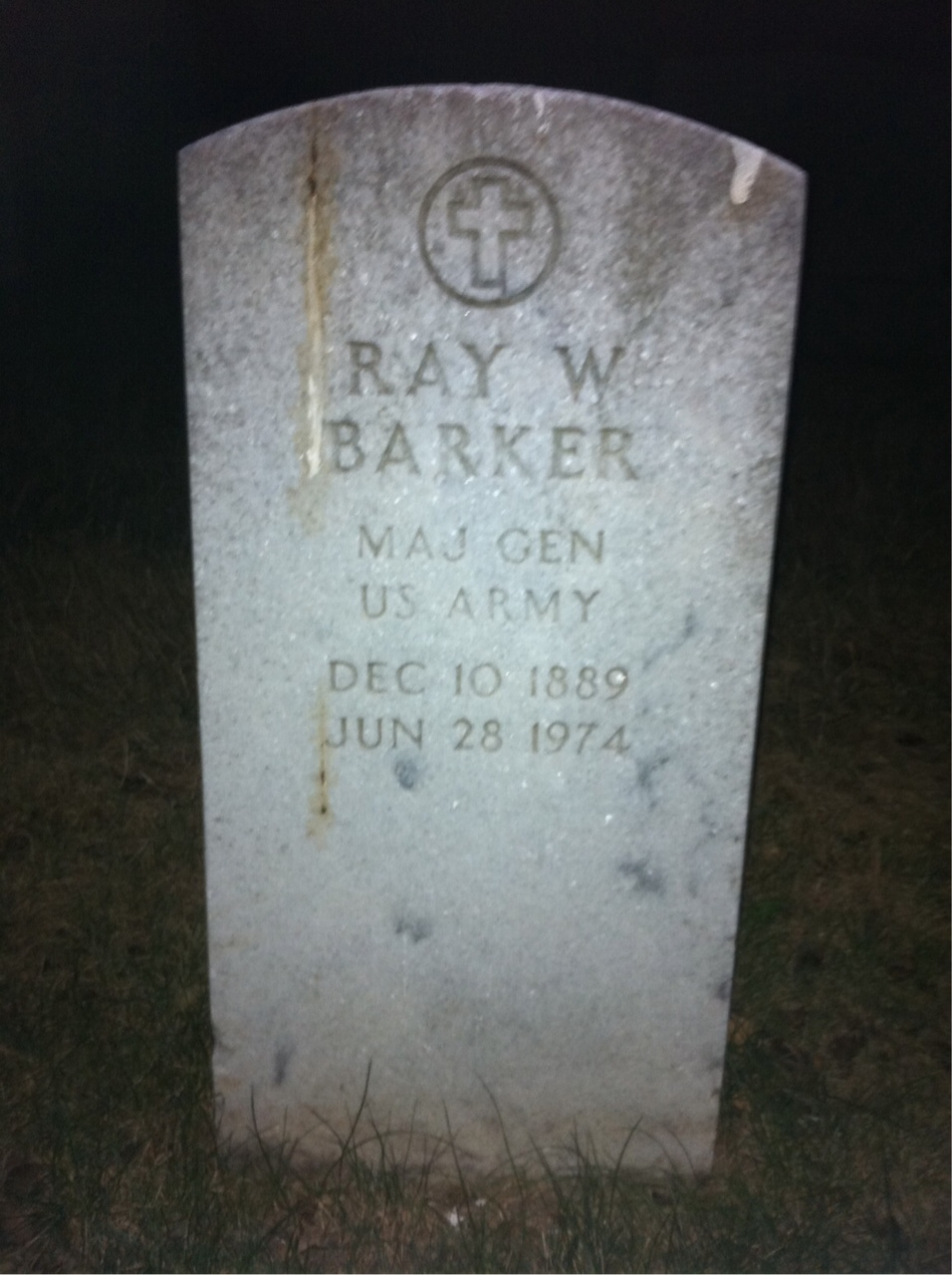
The grave of Major General Ray Barker at Arlington National Cemetery.

After suffering a back injury, Barker was forced to retire. In the hospital he was visited regularly by Eisenhower including discussions of post-career options, where Eisenhower ultimately referred him to a position as a headmaster. Barker served as the headmaster at The Manlius School, an independent, non-sectarian, college-preparatory military school for boys in the town of Manlius in Central New York. Barker served from 1946 until 1960.

During this tenure, he accompanied retired general Lucius Clay on a trip to Berlin, Germany, for the dedication of that city's Liberty Bell on October 24, 1950.

Upon his death in 1974 he was buried at Arlington National Cemetery.

Military offices
Preceded by Edwin P. Parker Jr.	Commanding General 78th Infantry Division; 1945–1946	Succeeded by Post deactivated
