= Washington L. Capps =

United States Navy admiral (1864–1935)

Washington Lee Capps
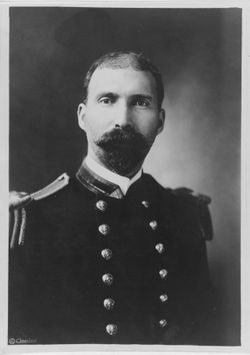
- Born: January 31, 1864; Portsmouth, Virginia, US
- Died: May 31, 1935 (aged 71); Washington, D.C., US
- Burial place: Arlington National Cemetery
- Military career
- Allegiance: United States of America
- Branch: United States Navy
- Service years: 1884–1935
- Rank: Rear admiral
- Conflicts: Spanish–American War: Battle of Manila Bay; World War I

Washington Lee Capps (31 January 1864 – 31 May 1935) was an officer of the United States Navy, who served during the Spanish–American War and World War I. In the first years of the 20th century, he served as Constructor of the Navy and Chief of the Bureau of Construction and Repair, with responsibility for naval shipbuilding.

== Early life and career ==
Capps was born in Portsmouth, Virginia, 31 January 1864. He graduated from the United States Naval Academy in 1884. Upon graduation, he served in the screw frigate Tennessee for the two years of sea duty then customary prior to receiving his officer's commission.

After becoming an ensign in 1886, Capps studied naval architecture at the University of Glasgow in Scotland. After returning to the United States in 1888, he was appointed Assistant Naval Constructor. He undertook brief duty at the Navy Department, and was then assigned to William Cramp & Sons' shipyard in Philadelphia.

Capps moved to the New York Navy Yard in 1889 and remained there joining the Bureau of Construction and Repair in 1892. Three years later he became the superintending constructor at the Union Iron Works in San Francisco. There, he supervised the construction of Oregon (Battleship No. 3), Wisconsin (Battleship No. 9), Farragut (Torpedo Boat No. 11), Marietta (Gunboat No. 15), and Wheeling (Gunboat No. 14).

== Spanish–American War and afterward ==
Later attached to the staff of Commodore George Dewey, commander of the Asiatic Squadron, Capps was present during the Battle of Manila Bay. After the capture of Manila, Capps had three of the Spanish warships salvaged and repaired.

Upon his return to the United States, Capps spent two years with the Board of Inspection and Survey. He followed this with a tour of duty as the Head, Construction and Repair Department at the New York Navy Yard.

== Constructor of the Navy / Chief of the Bureau of Construction and Repair ==
In 1903, Capps became Constructor of the Navy, as well as Chief of the Bureau of Construction and Repair, with the rank of rear admiral. He served in the position until 1910. From 1908 to 1909, Capps was also acting Chief of the Bureau of Steam Engineering because of the sudden retirement of Rear Adm. John K. Barton.

During his tenure as Constructor of the Navy, the Bureau tested and adopted numerous new ideas in warship design. Among his notable innovations was the decision to mount battleships' main batteries on the centerline, thereby increasing their broadside weight of metal to the maximum.

== Other pre-World War I activities ==
Capps also served on a number of American and international committees which had been established for such purposes—among others—as improving the organization of the Navy and adopting new safety measures at sea to prevent a recurrence of disasters such as the sinking of the RMS Titanic in April 1912.

== World War I and post-war service ==
During World War I, Capps was senior member of the Navy Compensation Board, which oversaw the costs of the Navy's expanded ship-acquisition program. He also served as general manager of the United States Shipping Board Merchant Fleet Corporation.

Forced by poor health to relinquish these duties for a time, Capps returned to his position on the Compensation Board, became the senior member of the Naval War Claims Board, and served on other boards and committees.

Although placed on the retired list effective 31 January 1928, Capps continued on active duty until the day of his death at Washington, D.C., on 31 May 1935. He was buried in Arlington National Cemetery.

== Namesakes ==
During World War II, the Navy honored Rear Admiral Capps by naming two vessels after him: the destroyer USS Capps (DD-550), commissioned in 1942; and the Type P2-SE2-R1 transport USS Admiral W. L. Capps (AP-121), commissioned on 18 September 1944.
