= Hugh Joseph Gaffey =

American general (1895–1946)

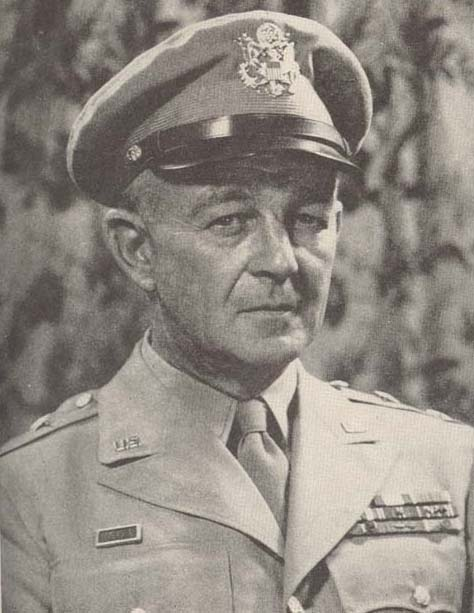
- Born: November 18, 1895; Hartford, Connecticut, United States
- Died: June 16, 1946 (aged 50); Godman Army Airfield, Kentucky, United States
- Military career
- Allegiance: United States
- Branch: United States Army
- Service years: 1917–1946
- Rank: Major General
- Service number: 0-8435
- Unit: Field Artillery Branch
- Commands: 2nd Armored Division; 4th Armored Division; XXIII Corps
- Conflicts: World War I World War II
- Awards: Army Distinguished Service Medal (2); Silver Star; Legion of Merit; Bronze Star (2)

Major General Hugh Joseph Gaffey (November 18, 1895 – June 16, 1946) was a senior United States Army officer. He was a career officer who served in both World War I and World War II. Maj. Gen. Hugh J. Gaffey commanded the XXIII Corps (United States) (17 March 1945 – August 1945) during and through World War II.

== Early life and military career ==
Born in Hartford, Connecticut, Gaffey graduated from Worcester Academy in 1916 and later attended Officers Training School at Fort Niagara, New York, and was commissioned as a second lieutenant in the Field Artillery Branch of the United States Army Reserve on August 15, 1917, four months after the American entry into World War I. Assigned to the 312th Field Artillery Regiment, part of the 79th Division, at Fort Meade, Maryland, in August 1918 he was sent to the Western Front to serve with the American Expeditionary Force (AEF). He later served in Germany with the 12th Field Artillery Regiment, part of the 2nd Division, before returning to the United States in August 1919, nine months after the war came to an end with the signing of the Armistice with Germany.

== Between the wars ==
During the next two decades in the interwar period, he transferred to the Regular Army and was soon promoted to first lieutenant. He joined the 15th Field Artillery Regiment in 1922 and entered the U.S. Army Field Artillery School at Fort Sill, Oklahoma. Graduating from there in 1926, he became a professor of Military Science and Tactics at Cornell University, New York. In 1935 he attended the U.S. Army Command and General Staff School at Fort Leavenworth, Kansas. He graduated the following year and was assigned to the 68th Field Artillery Regiment (Mechanized).

== World War II ==
By July 1940, during World War II (although the United States was still neutral at this point), he was a G-3 staff officer with I Armored Corps. He served with the corps until July 1942, seven months after the American entry into the war, which occurred due to the Japanese attack on Pearl Harbor on December 7, 1941.

He was appointed to the one-star general officer rank of brigadier general on August 5, 1942, and was sent to England in November. Soon afterwards he was sent to Morocco in North Africa to command Combat Command 'B' (CCB) of the 2nd Armored Division. He later served as chief of staff of the II Corps, then fighting in Tunisia, under the command of Lieutenant General George S. Patton Jr., later replaced by Major General Omar Bradley.

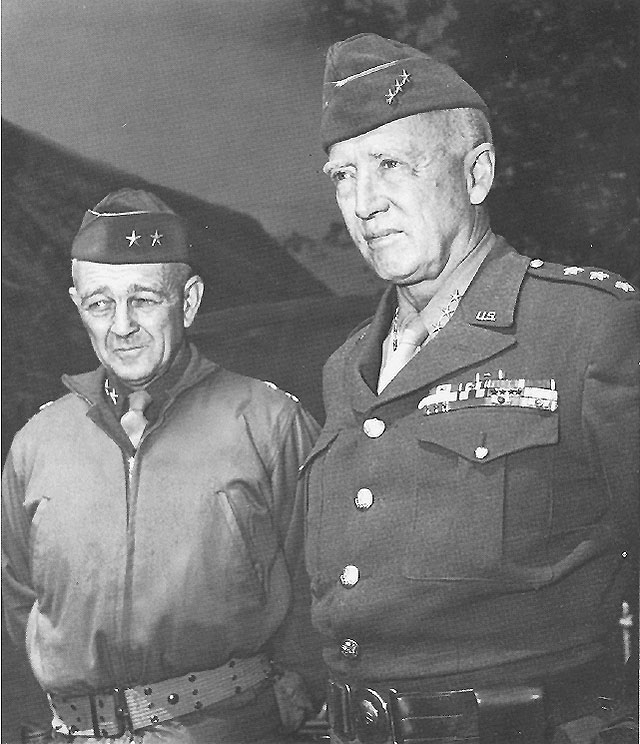
Major General Hugh Joseph Gaffey (left) and Lieutenant General George S. Patton, pictured here sometime in 1944.

In April 1943, when the campaign in North Africa was coming to an end, he was promoted to the two-star general officer rank of major general and a month later became commanding general (CG) of the 2nd Armored Division, replacing Major General Ernest N. Harmon. At the age of 47, Gaffey was one of the youngest division commanders in the U.S. Army at the time. He commanded the division in the Allied invasion of Sicily (codenamed Operation Husky) in the summer of 1943 where, fighting in difficult mountainous terrain and operating in very hot weather, the division, advancing some 200 miles and facing light resistance, captured the Sicilian capital of Palermo along with thousands of Italian soldiers. The 2nd Armored Division, under Major General Gaffey, was sent to England later in the year to train and spearhead the Allied invasion of Normandy (codenamed Operation Overlord), scheduled for the following year.

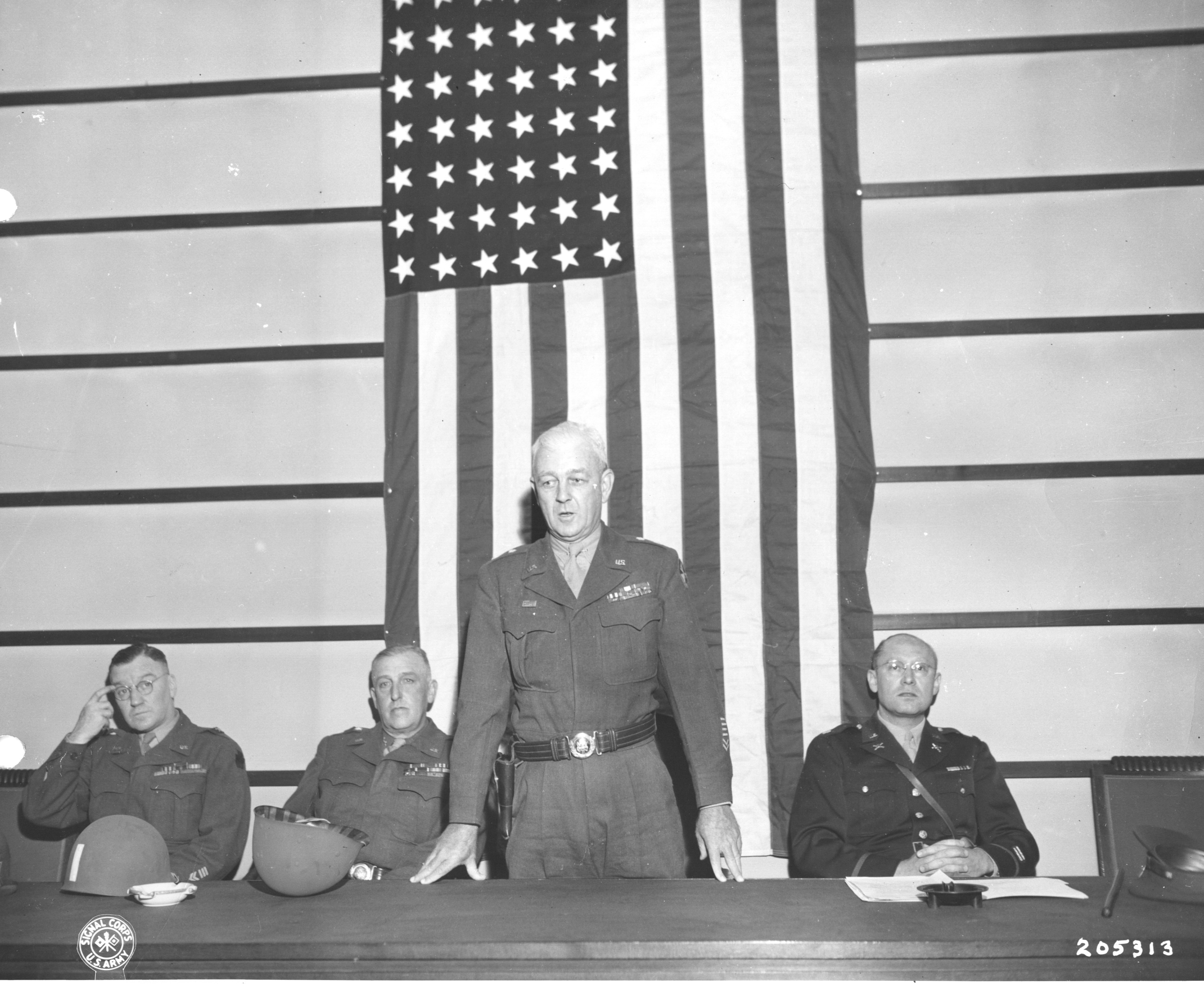
Major General Gaffey addresses heads of regional German governments and Army technical staff discussing the transfer of government to local units. From left to right are: Brigadier General Perry, Assistant Commanding General, Major General Norman Cota, 28th Division; Major General Gaffey, and Lieutenant Colonel Campbell W. Newman. Neustadt, Germany, May 18, 1945.

In April 1944, handing over command of the 2nd Armored Division to Major General Edward H. Brooks, he was designated chief of staff of the Third Army, serving again under Lieutenant General George Patton. Gaffey served in this capacity through the campaign in Western Europe, from the time the Third Army landed in France in July 1944 and played a major role in Operation Cobra and the Battle of the Falaise Gap, followed by the Allied advance from Paris to the Rhine and the Battle of Metz. In December 1944 he replaced Major General John Shirley Wood as CG of the 4th Armored Division, which played a major role in the Battle of the Bulge, helping to break the siege of Bastogne. He remained in command of the division until March 1945, towards the end of the war in Europe, when he became CG of the XXIII Corps. He relinquished command of XXIII Corps in September, when the war ended due to the surrender of Japan.

For his services during the war he was twice awarded the Army Distinguished Service Medal.

== Postwar ==
In June 1946, Gaffey was the commanding general of Fort Knox, Kentucky, when he was killed in the crash of a B-25 Mitchell as it attempted to land at Godman Field, Kentucky. He was buried at the post cemetery.

== Namesake ==
The U.S. Navy transport ship USNS General Hugh J. Gaffey (T-AP-121) was named in his honor on March 1, 1950.

Military offices
Preceded by Ernest N. Harmon	Commanding General 2nd Armored Division; 1943–1944	Succeeded by Edward H. Brooks
Preceded by John S. Wood	Commanding General 4th Armored Division; 1944–1945	Succeeded by William M. Hoge
Preceded by James Van Fleet	Commanding General XXIII Corps; March–September 1945	Succeeded by Frank W. Milburn
