= Supreme Headquarters Allied Expeditionary Force =

Supreme Headquarters, Allied Expeditionary Force (SHAEF)
- Shoulder sleeve insignia
- Active: 1943–1945
- Disbanded: 14 July 1945
- Countries: United Kingdom; United States; Australia; Canada; India; New Zealand; South Africa; Occupied countries: Belgium; Czechoslovakia; Free France (Kingdom of Greece) Greece; Luxembourg; Netherlands; Norway; Poland (Kingdom of Yugoslavia) Yugoslavia
- Allegiance: Allies
- Type: Combined headquarters
- Role: Theater of operations
- Part of: Combined Chiefs of Staff
- Nickname: SHAEF
- Engagements: World War II

Commanders
- Supreme Commander: Dwight D. Eisenhower
- Deputy Supreme Commander: Arthur Tedder

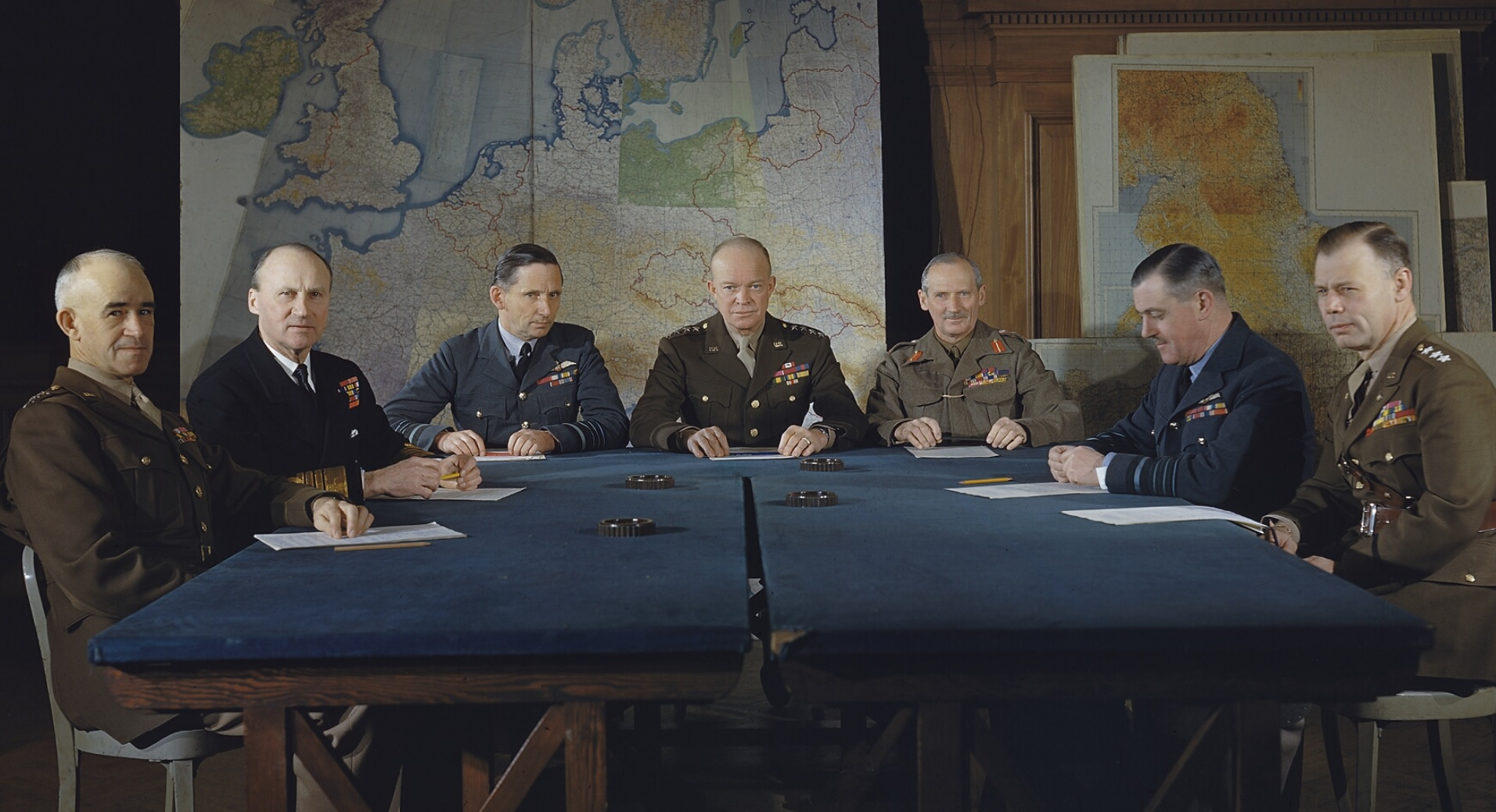
SHAEF commanders at a conference in London Left to right: Lieutenant General Omar N. Bradley, Admiral Sir Bertram Ramsay, Air Chief Marshal Sir Arthur Tedder, General Dwight D. Eisenhower, General Sir Bernard Montgomery, Air Chief Marshal Sir Trafford Leigh-Mallory, and Lieutenant General Walter Bedell Smith

Supreme Headquarters Allied Expeditionary Force (SHAEF; /ˈʃeɪf/ SHAYF) was the headquarters of the Supreme Commander, Allied Expeditionary Force (SCAEF), in northwest Europe, from late 1943 until the end of World War II. General Dwight D. Eisenhower was the commander in SHAEF throughout its existence. The position itself shares a common lineage with Supreme Allied Commander Europe and Atlantic, but they are different titles.

== History ==
Eisenhower transferred from command of the Mediterranean Theater of Operations to command SHAEF, which was formed in Camp Griffiss, Bushy Park, Teddington, London, from December 1943; an adjacent street named Shaef Way, and a gate into the park called Shaef Gate, remain to this day. Southwick House was used as an alternative headquarters near Portsmouth. Its staff took the outline plan for Operation Overlord created by Lieutenant General Sir Frederick E. Morgan, Chief of Staff to the Supreme Allied Commander (Designate) (COSSAC), and Major General Ray Barker. Morgan, who had been appointed chief of staff to the Supreme Allied Commander (designate) in mid-March 1943 began planning for the invasion of Europe before Eisenhower's appointment and moulded the plan into the final version, which was executed on 6 June 1944. That process was shaped by Eisenhower and the land forces commander, General Sir Bernard Law Montgomery, for the initial part of the invasion.

SHAEF remained in the United Kingdom until sufficient forces were ashore to justify its transfer to France. At that point, Montgomery ceased to command all land forces but continued as Commander in Chief of the British 21st Army Group (21 AG) on the eastern wing of the Normandy bridgehead. The US 12th Army Group (12 AG) commanded by Lieutenant General Omar Bradley was created as the western wing of the bridgehead. As the breakout from Normandy took place, the Allies launched the invasion of southern France on 15 August 1944 with the US 6th Army Group (6 AG) under the command of Lieutenant General Jacob L. Devers. During the invasion of southern France, the 6 AG was under the command of the Allied Forces Headquarters (AFHQ) of the Mediterranean Theatre of Operations, but after one month command passed to SHAEF. By this time, the three Army Groups had taken up the positions on the Western Front in which they would remain until the end of the war—the British 21 AG to the North, the American 12 AG in the middle and the 6 AG to the South. By December 1944, SHAEF had established itself in the Trianon Palace Hotel in Versailles, France. In February 1945, it moved to Reims and on 26 May 1945, to Frankfurt.

== Order of battle ==
SHAEF commanded the largest number of formations ever committed to one operation on the Western Front, with American, Free French, British and Canadian forces. It commanded all Allied airborne forces as an airborne army, as well as three army groups that controlled a total of eight field armies;

- First Allied Airborne Army
  - all Allied airborne divisions, brigades and paratrooper transport wings
- British 21st Army Group
  - First Canadian Army
  - Second British Army
- US 12th Army Group
  - First United States Army
  - Third United States Army
  - Ninth United States Army
  - Fifteenth United States Army
- US 6th Army Group
  - French First Army
  - Seventh United States Army

SHAEF also controlled substantial naval forces during Operation Neptune, the assault phase of Overlord, and two tactical air forces: the US Ninth Air Force and the RAF Second Tactical Air Force. Allied strategic bomber forces in the UK also came under its command during Operation Neptune.

== Commanders and senior staff ==
	Name	Photo	Branch
Supreme Commander, Allied Expeditionary Force	General of the Army Dwight D. Eisenhower		United States Army
Deputy Supreme Commander, Allied Expeditionary Force	Air Chief Marshal Sir Arthur Tedder		Royal Air Force
Chief of Staff	Lieutenant General Walter Bedell Smith		United States Army
Deputy Chief of Staff (Operations)	Lieutenant General Frederick E. Morgan		British Army
Deputy Chief of Staff (Chief Administrative Officer)	Lieutenant General Humfrey Gale		British Army
Deputy Chief of Staff (Air)	Air Marshal James Robb (to May 1945)		Royal Air Force
Deputy Chief of Staff (Air)	Air Vice Marshal Roderick Carr (from June 1945)		Royal Air Force
Ground forces commanders	Field Marshal Sir Bernard Montgomery		British Army; 21st Army Group
Ground forces commanders	Lieutenant General Omar Bradley		United States Army; 12th Army Group (activated 14 July 1944)
Ground forces commanders	Lieutenant General Jacob L. Devers		United States Army; 6th Army Group (activated 29 July 1944)
Air Force Commander-in-Chief	Air Marshal Sir Trafford Leigh-Mallory		Royal Air Force; AEAF
Deputy Air Force Commander-in-Chief	Major General Hoyt Vandenberg		United States Army Air Forces
Naval Forces Commander	Admiral Sir Bertram Ramsay.		Royal Navy
French Representative	General Marie-Pierre Kœnig		(France) French Liberation Army
Soviet Representative	General Ivan Susloparov		(Soviet Union) Red Army

Additionally

- Secretary, General Staff: Colonel Ford Trimble
- G-1 (Personnel): Major General Ray Barker
- G-2 (Intelligence): Major General John Whiteley, then Major General Kenneth Strong
- G-3 (Operations) : Major General Harold Bull
- G-4 (Logistics): Major General Robert Crawford
- G-5: (Civil/Military Operations) Major General Sir Roger Lumley then Lieutenant General Arthur Edward Grasett
- Services of Supply/Communications Zone: Lieutenant General John C. H. Lee

Political officers

- Ambassador William Phillips (US)
- Mr. Charles Peake (UK)
- Mr. Christopher Steel (UK)
- Mr. Samuel Reber (US)
- Ambassador Robert Daniel Murphy (US)

== Missions ==
SHAEF Missions
Nation		Name	Branch	Title
Belgium	Luxembourg	Major-General George Erskine	British Army	Head
Belgium	Luxembourg	Col. John B. Sherman	United States Army	Deputy for Belgium
Belgium	Luxembourg	Col. F. E. Fraser	United States Army	Deputy for Luxembourg
France		Major General John Taylor Lewis	United States Army	Head
France		Major-General Harold Redman	British Army	Deputy
Netherlands		Major-General John George Walters Clark	British Army	Head
Netherlands		Brigadier General George P. Howell	United States Army	Deputy
Denmark		Major-General R. H. Dewing	British Army	Head
Denmark		Col. Ford Trimble	United States Army	Deputy
Norway		General Sir Andrew Thorne	British Army	Head
Norway		Col. Charles H. Wilson	United States Army	Deputy

== Post-World War II successors ==
After the surrender of Germany, SHAEF was dissolved on 14 July 1945.

=== American ===
With respect to the U.S. forces, it was replaced by U.S. Forces, European Theater (USFET). USFET was reorganized as EUCOM (European Command, not to be confused with the present-day United States European Command) on 15 March 1947.

=== 1948–1951: Western Union ===
The 1948–1951 Western Union Defence Organization's (WUDO) command structure was largely patterned on SHAEF's structure.

=== 1951–present: Supreme Headquarters Allied Powers Europe/Allied Command Operations ===
Starting in April 1951 when the North Atlantic Treaty Organization (NATO) cannibalised WUDO, it was put under the command of Supreme Allied Commander Europe Dwight D. Eisenhower in Supreme Headquarters Allied Powers Europe (SHAPE; Allied Command Europe [ACE]), comprising many of the same allies that were part of SHAEF. WUDO, followed by SHAPE, were in many respects the successors to SHAEF.

SHAPE is currently the headquarters of NATO's Allied Command Operations (ACO). Since 1967 it has been located at Casteau, north of the Belgian city of Mons, but it had previously been located, from 1953, at Rocquencourt, next to Versailles, France.

From 1951 to 2003, SHAPE was the headquarters of Allied Command Europe (ACE). Since 2003 it has been the headquarters of ACO, controlling all NATO operations worldwide.

=== 2017–present: Military Planning and Conduct Capability ===
The European Union has established a Military Planning and Conduct Capability (MPCC), which is due to gain more tasks and may rival SHAPE's dominance as the primary forum for multinational European missions.

== Notes and references ==
=== References ===
- Winters, Major Dick, with Cole C. Kingseed (2006). Beyond Band of Brothers: The War Memoirs of Major Dick Winters. Berkley Hardcover. ISBN 978-0-425-20813-7., p. 210.
- Pogue, Forrest C. (1954), European Theater of Operations The Supreme Command, United States Army in World War II, Washington, D. C.: Office of the Chief of Military History, Department of the Army, LCCN 53-61717 – via Hyperwar Foundation
