= James Van Fleet =

US Army general (1892–1992)

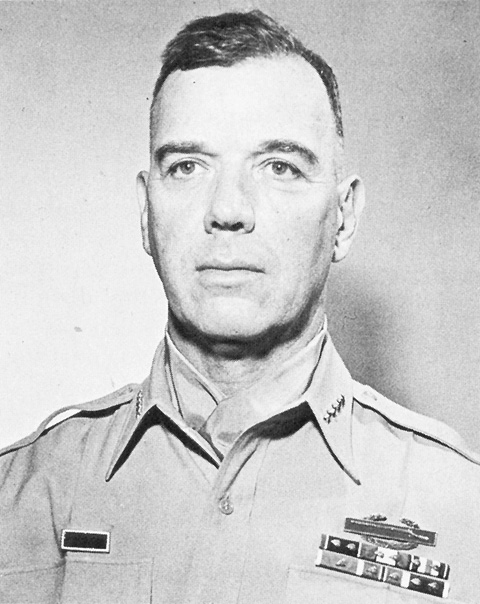
- Van Fleet in 1953
- Born: 19 March 1892; Fort Lee, New Jersey, U.S.
- Died: 23 September 1992 (aged 100); Polk City, Florida, U.S.
- Burial place: Arlington National Cemetery, Virginia, U.S.
- Military career
- Allegiance: United States
- Branch: United States Army
- Service years: 1915–1953
- Rank: General
- Service number: 0-3847
- Unit: Infantry Branch
- Commands: Eighth United States Army; Second United States Army; III Corps; XXIII Corps; 90th Infantry Division; 4th Infantry Division; 8th Infantry Regiment; 1st Battalion, 29th Infantry Regiment; 17th Machine Gun Battalion
- Conflicts: Border War; World War I; Meuse–Argonne Offensive; World War II; Operation Overlord; Battle of Normandy; Siegfried Line campaign; Battle of the Bulge; Western Allied invasion of Germany; Occupation of Germany; Greek Civil War; Operation Pyrsos; Korean War
- Awards: Distinguished Service Cross (3); Army Distinguished Service Medal (4); Silver Star (3); Legion of Merit (2); Bronze Star Medal (3); Purple Heart (3); Taegeuk Order of Military Merit
- Other work: Football coach; Diplomat; Businessman; Author; Rancher

General James Alward Van Fleet (19 March 1892 – 23 September 1992) was a United States Army officer who served during World War I, World War II and the Korean War. Van Fleet was a native of New Jersey, who was raised in Florida and graduated from the United States Military Academy. He served as a regimental, divisional and corps commander during World War II and as the commanding general of United States Army and other United Nations forces during the Korean War.

== Early life and education ==
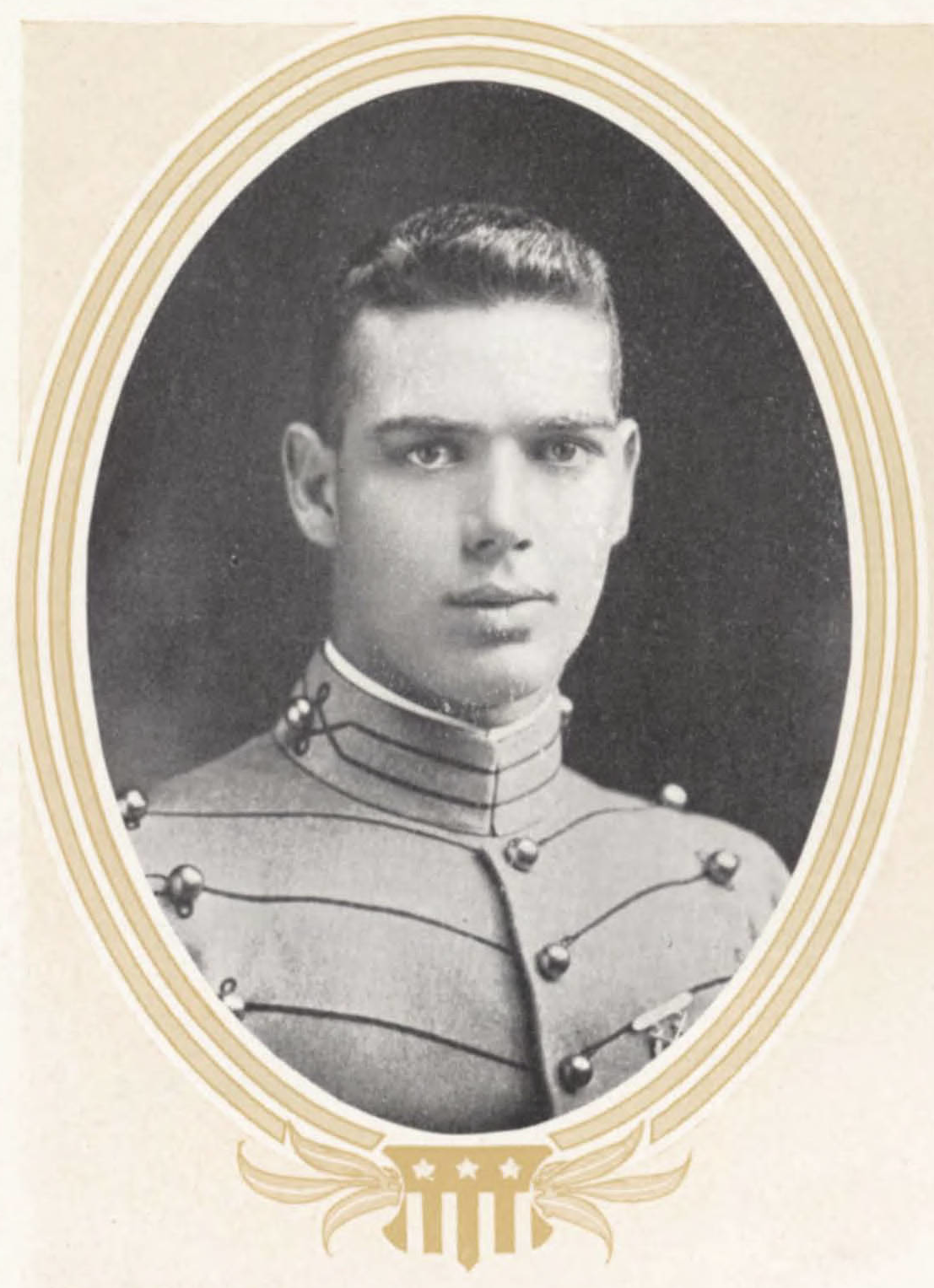
At West Point in 1915

James Van Fleet was born in the Coytesville section of Fort Lee, New Jersey. His family then moved to Florida while he was an infant, and he grew up there. Van Fleet received his high school education at the Summerlin Institute in Bartow, Florida.

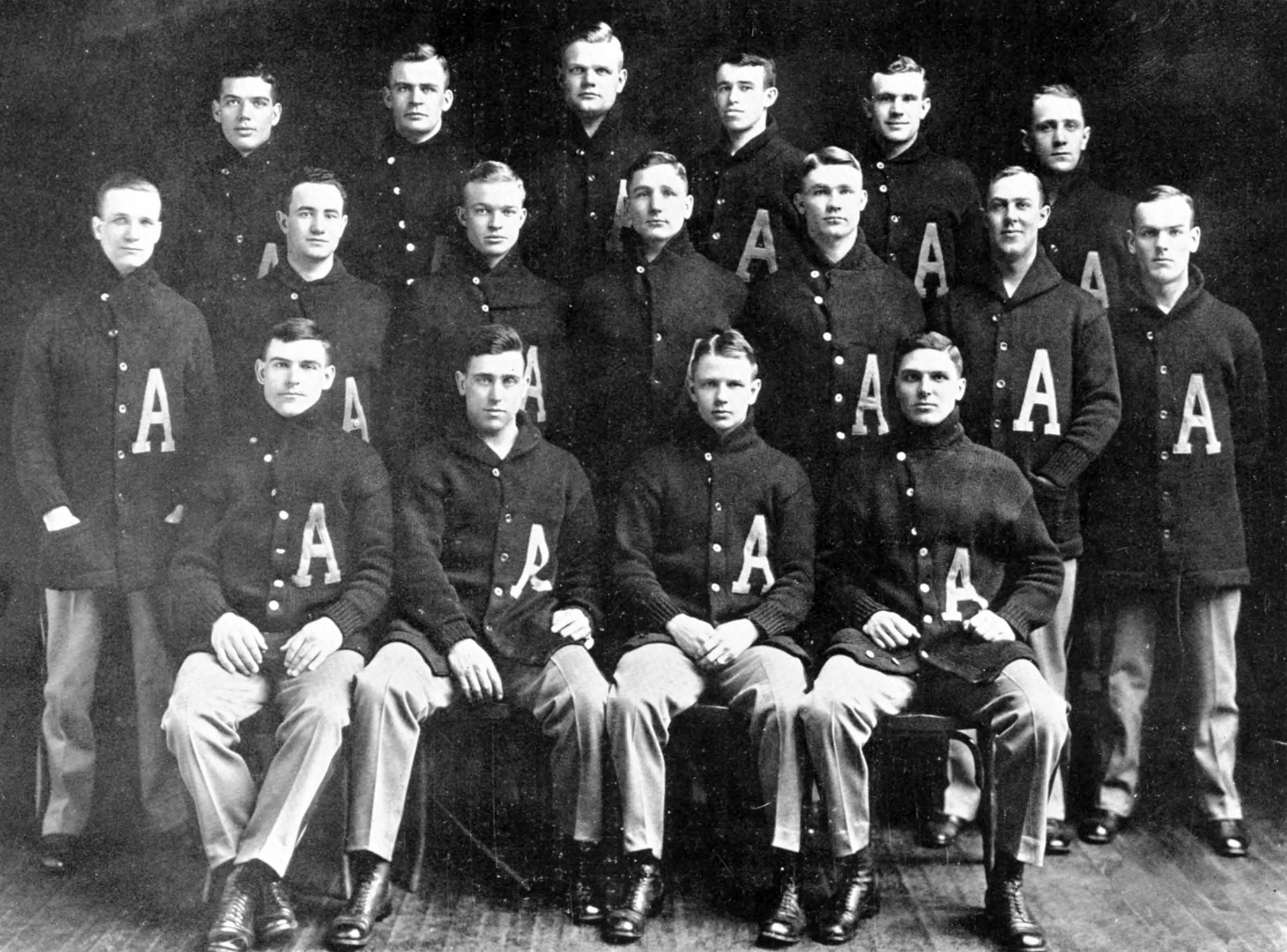
Group photo of the 1915 West Point letterman. Van Fleet is stood in the back row on the extreme left.

After graduating from Summerlin in 1911, Van Fleet received an appointment to the United States Military Academy at West Point, New York. While he was a cadet at West Point, he was a member of the Army football team and was a standout fullback on the undefeated Army team of 1914. Van Fleet graduated in the famous West Point Class of 1915, which included so many future generals that it has been called "the class the stars fell on" (stars being the insignia of generals). Van Fleet's classmates included Dwight D. Eisenhower and Omar Bradley, among many others.

== Career ==
=== Early career ===
After graduation, Van Fleet was commissioned as a second lieutenant into the Infantry Branch of the United States Army. He was assigned to a company of the 3rd Infantry Regiment at Plattsburgh, New York, where he served from 12 September to 1 October 1915. He then served at Madison Barracks, in Sacketts Harbor, New York, until 11 May 1916. The 3rd Infantry was then transferred to Eagle Pass, Texas, for service on the Mexican border until 8 October 1917, over six months after the American entry into World War I. During his time in Texas, Van Fleet was promoted twice, to first lieutenant on 1 July 1916, and to captain on 15 May 1917.

Van Fleet then transferred to Fort Leavenworth, Kansas, where he served as an instructor for provisional officers, 10 October 1917 to 22 March 1918; commanding Army Service Schools Detachment No. 2, to 6 April 1918; at Kansas City, Missouri, inspecting 7th Infantry Regiment, National Guard of Missouri, 1 to 5 April; at Camp Forrest, Ga., Camp Wadsworth, S. C., and Camp Mills, Long Island, commanding a company of the 16th Machine Gun Battalion, from 10 April to 4 July 1918. He received a temporary promotion to major on 17 June 1918.

Van Fleet was then shipped to France, where he commanded the 17th Machine Gun Battalion, part of the 6th Division, from 12 September 1918 to 11 June 1919. He was wounded in action in the Meuse–Argonne offensive on 4 November 1918, just seven days before the Armistice with Germany which caused hostilities to cease.

=== Interwar period ===
After the war, Van Fleet was reduced to his permanent rank of captain in 1922 and promoted to major in the Regular Army in December 1924. While serving as the senior officer of the University of Florida's U.S. Army Reserve Officers' Training Corps (ROTC) program, Van Fleet also served as the head coach of the Florida Gators football team in 1923 and 1924, after assisting William G. Kline for a year. He led the Gators into national prominence with a 12–3–4 (.737) record.

From 1924 to 1927 he was stationed at Camp Galliard in the Panama Canal Zone where he commanded the 1st Battalion, 42nd Infantry Regiment. This assignment was followed by one at the Infantry School at Fort Benning, Georgia. At Fort Benning Van Fleet served as an instructor from April 1927 to September 1928 and as a student in the Advanced Course from September 1928 to June 1929. In addition to his other duties, Van Fleet served as head coach of the post's football team. Van Fleet then returned to the University of Florida where he was the Professor of Military Science and Tactics from July 1929 to June 1933.

From July 1933 to July 1935 he was stationed at Fort Williams in Cape Elizabeth, Maine, where he served as commander of the 2nd Battalion, 5th Infantry and also as the post's executive officer. During this assignment, he oversaw the construction of a duck pond in the northwest corner of the parade field.

Unlike the majority of his fellow officers who rose to high command in the next few years, Van Fleet was unique in the sense that he never attended either the Command and Staff College or the Army War College during his military career.

=== World War II ===
Van Fleet commanded the 8th Infantry Regiment (part of the 4th Infantry Division) for three years (July 1941 to July 1944) and led it into combat in Europe in World War II, participating in the D-Day landings on Utah Beach in June 1944. On Utah Beach Van Fleet distinguished himself by outstanding combat leadership and was awarded his first Distinguished Service Cross (DSC).

Although widely regarded by many as an outstanding officer, he was blocked from promotion because the Army Chief of Staff, General George C. Marshall, who had a tendency to forget and confuse names, erroneously confused Van Fleet with a well-known alcoholic officer with a similar name. When General Dwight D. Eisenhower, a former West Point classmate of Van Fleet's and now the Supreme Allied Commander in Western Europe, informed Marshall of his mistake, Van Fleet was soon promoted to divisional and corps command.

Following promotion to Brigadier general in August 1944, Van Fleet became the Assistant Division Commander of the 2nd Infantry Division (July to September 1944) and then briefly commanded the 4th Infantry Division (September to October 1944) before assuming command of the 90th Infantry Division (October 1944 to February 1945) and gaining a promotion to Major general in November. He gained the admiration and respect of his superiors, in particular Lieutenant general George S. Patton, commander of the Third Army, for his command of the 90th.

After briefly commanding XXIII Corps, on 17 March 1945 Van Fleet replaced Major general John Millikin as commander of III Corps where Millikin served with Patton's Third Army. Van Fleet commanded III Corps through the end of the war and the occupation of Germany until returning to the United States in February 1946.

=== Germany and Greek Civil War ===
Van Fleet was reassigned to Governor's Island, New York, as commander of the 2nd Service Command before becoming the Deputy Commanding General of the 1st United States Army in June 1946. In December 1947 he went to Frankfurt, West Germany as G-3 (operations officer) of the United States European Command.

In February 1948, Van Fleet was promoted to Lieutenant general and sent to Greece as the head of the Joint U.S. Military Advisory Group and executor of the "Truman Doctrine". He was instrumental in the outcome of the Greek Civil War by providing advice to the Greek government and 250 military advisers, as well as administering $400 million in military aid. The central square in the northern Greek city of Kastoria has featured a bust of Van Fleet for many years, and was replaced with a new statue as recently as 2007.

Van Fleet was commanding general of the Second United States Army from 10 August 1950 to 11 April 1951.

=== Korean War ===
On 14 April 1951, Van Fleet arrived in South Korea, replacing General Matthew B. Ridgway as commander of the U.S. Eighth Army and United Nations Command forces. Van Fleet was then promoted to General on 31 July 1951.

In early 1951, Van Fleet proposed an amphibious landing at Wonsan, behind communist lines however Ridgway, now UN commander vetoed the plan.

Van Fleet played a significant role in reorganizing the Republic of Korea Army and reestablishing the Korea Military Academy (KMA), which is now considered the top military academy in the country. Taking inspiration from his previous experiences, Van Fleet said he wished to do for the Republic of Korea Army "the same as we did for the Greek divisions".

In October 1951, the ROK Army Chief of Staff proposed an academy with a four-year course modeled after West Point. They created a temporary site for this school at Jinhae-gu, and appointed three West Point graduates to oversee the program. They held an opening ceremony on 20 January 1952. (Note: Na source has a typo; says opening ceremony was 1951, but it should be 1952 according to the source Na cites) The KMA was very popular among South Koreans, with ROK Army Chief of Staff Lee Jong-chan writing:

The Korean Military Academy is the hope of our people … We are also assured of our contribution to the new institution by firmly establishing an honourable and respectable tradition like that of your Military Academy in America

— Lieutenant General Lee Chongchan, Chief of Staff, ROK Army, to General J. Lawton Collins, Chief of Staff, US Army, 5 February 1952, RG 319, Army Intelligence Project Decimal Files, 1951–52, Box 164, NA.

The Korean Defense Ministry called Van Fleet the "father of the Korean Army" in 2015 for his contributions to the KMA and elsewhere. A statue of Van Fleet was erected on the KMA campus on 31 March 1960 to honor his contributions towards the academy.

In April 1952, Van Fleet's son died while piloting a B-26 bomber over Haeju.

=== Activities after the Korean War ===
Van Fleet commanded the Eighth Army until 11 February 1953, when he was relieved by General Maxwell Taylor. Before he left Korea, during a 19 January 1953 speech on the steps of the Korean Capitol Building, Van Fleet said, "I shall come back. You have made me a part of you. I know you are a part of me. I shall not ask you to give me back my heart. I leave it with you."

He retired from the Army at the end of March 1953 at the age of 61.

He appeared on an episode of What's My Line? on 26 July 1953. Van Fleet participated in the dedication ceremonies for the Sunshine Skyway Bridge which were held in 1954.

Van Fleet made significant efforts to fundraise and advocate for Korea-US ties after the war. He was chairman of the American-Korean Foundation (AFK) in the 1950s. And in 1957, Van Fleet was one of five signers of the Certificate of Incorporation of The Korea Society, the first nonprofit organization in the United States dedicated to the promotion of friendly relations between the peoples of the United States and Korea.

In May 1962, he was invited by South Korean President Park Chung Hee to visit Korea again. He returned to the US on 1 June 1962, and gave a speech called "The Miracle on the Han", in which he said:

I have been to Korea many times, each time agreeably surprised by the hard-working, skilled and intelligent labor force. This time I found it well-organized and dedicated. The military government has brought about security, stability, progress, and a moral rebirth. This is what I call “The Miracle on the Han.” [...] I shall not soon forget the beauty of their mountains and their valleys, the smiles and voices of their children, the hospitality and warmth of their homes. It is my other home, and I shall go back.

— The Miracle on the Han, Luncheon Meeting, Los Angeles World Affairs Council, 1 June 1962, VFPF, Van Fleet Foundation, Hobe Sound, FL, pp. 10-11.

== Death ==
Van Fleet died in his sleep on his ranch outside Polk City, Florida, on 23 September 1992, six months after his 100th birthday that March. He was the oldest living general officer in the United States at the time of his death. Van Fleet and his wife Helen are buried in Arlington National Cemetery. Buried with them is Van Fleet's second wife, Virginia, who died in 1986.

== Legacy ==
At the time of his retirement from active duty on 31 March 1953, former President Harry S. Truman said, "You want to know about a great general? There's Van Fleet. I sent him to Greece and he won that war. I sent him to Korea and he won that war. He's the greatest general we ever had." Van Fleet then allegedly replied "Well actually Mr. President you never quite let me finish that last one".

Van Fleet was the recipient of three Distinguished Service Crosses, four Distinguished Service Medals, three Silver Stars, three Bronze Star Medals, three Purple Hearts for wounds received in combat, and his most prized decoration—the Combat Infantryman's Badge (CIB) of the common foot soldier.

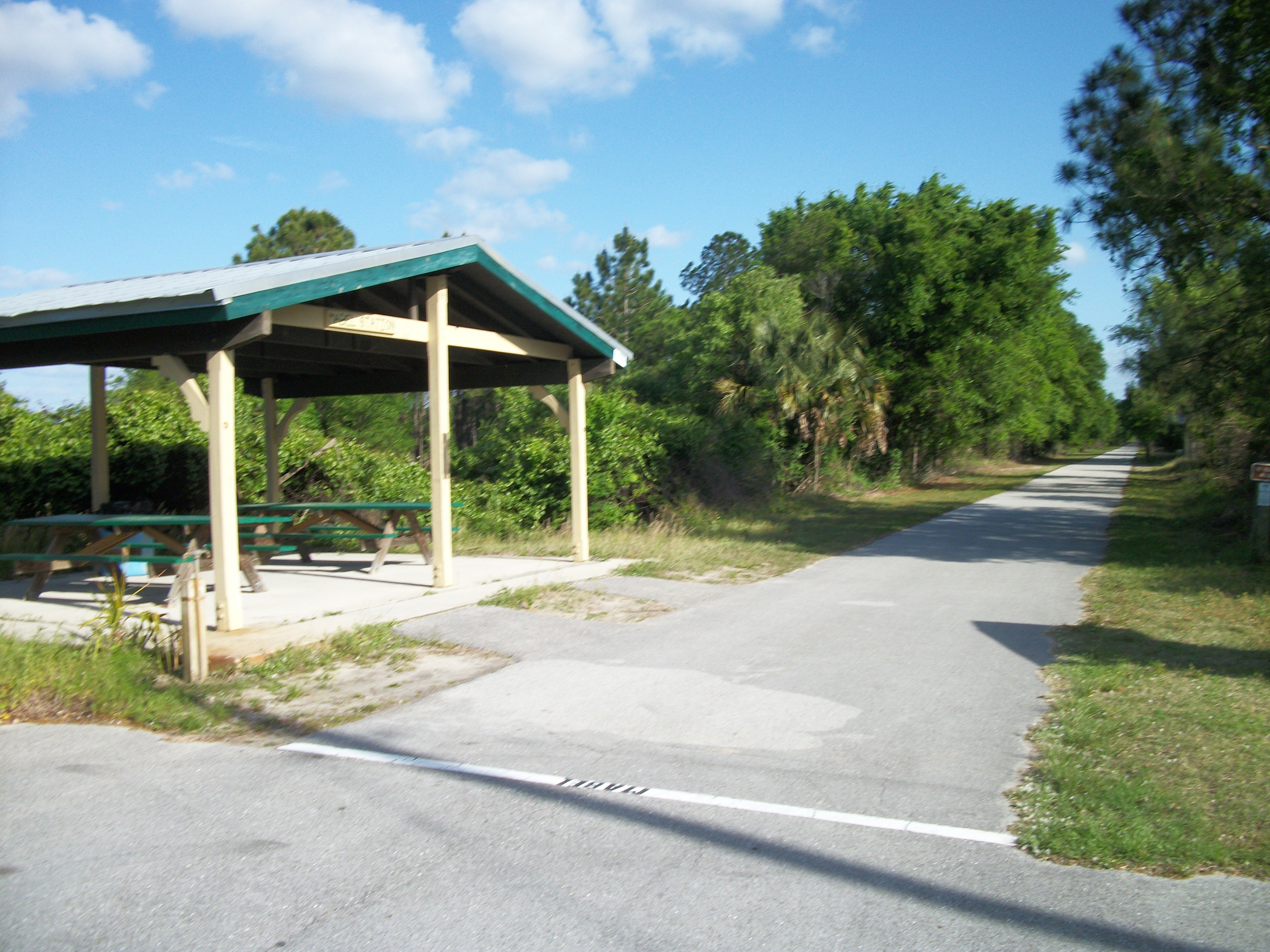
The General James A. Van Fleet State Trail (2010)

Shortly after his death, The Korea Society established the annual James A. Van Fleet Award to recognize people who have made significant contributions to US-Korea ties.

The University of Florida presented Van Fleet an honorary doctorate in 1946, and the university's military sciences building, which houses the U.S. Air Force, Army and Navy ROTC programs, is named Van Fleet Hall. He was inducted into the University of Florida Athletic Hall of Fame as an "honorary letter winner" in 1971. In 1998, a panel of Florida historians and other consultants named Van Fleet one of the fifty most important Floridians of the 20th century. The General James A. Van Fleet State Trail, running from Polk City to Mabel, Florida, is also named in his honor.

Van Fleet's estate donated his papers to the George C. Marshall Foundation.

A statue honoring him was erected at the central square of the Greek city of Kastoria, which was the location of his advanced command post during the Greek Civil War. There is also a statue honoring him at the grounds of Korean Military Academy, in recognition of his support for the South Korean Army during the Korean War.

In June 2015, the ROK issued a stamp to honor in Van Fleet's honor. In Fall 2015, the ROK Ministry of Defense awarded him the Paik Sun Yup ROK-US Alliance Award.

== Personal life ==
Van Fleet and his wife, Helen Moore Van Fleet, had three children, eight grandchildren, and twelve great-grandchildren. His only son, James Alward Van Fleet Jr., died during the Korean War.

Van Fleet was also an art collector and donated many rare and exceptional Asian objects to the Samuel P. Harn Museum of Art.

== Awards and decorations ==
Van Fleet's military awards include:

| 1st Row | Combat Infantryman Badge | | | |
| 2nd Row | | Distinguished Service Cross w/ two Oak leaf clusters | Distinguished Service Medal w/ three Oak leaf clusters | Silver Star w/ two Oak leaf clusters |
| 3rd Row | Legion of Merit w/ one Oak leaf cluster | Bronze Star Medal w/ two Oak leaf clusters | Purple Heart w/ two Oak leaf clusters | Air Medal w/ one Oak leaf cluster |
| 4th Row | Army Commendation Medal | Mexican Border Service Medal | World War I Victory Medal w/ 3 bronze service stars | Army of Occupation of Germany Medal |
| 5th Row | American Defense Service Medal | American Campaign Medal | European-African-Middle Eastern; Campaign Medal w/ Arrowhead and five Service stars | World War II Victory Medal |
| 6th Row | Army of Occupation Medal | National Defense Service Medal | Korean Service Medal w/ seven Service stars | United Nations Korea Medal |
| 7th Row | | Army Presidential Unit Citation | Republic of Korea; Presidential Unit Citation | |

Van Fleet also received the following foreign decorations:

- Grand Cross of the Order of the Phoenix (Greece)
- Distinguished Medal of Honor (Greece)
- Grand Commander of the Order of George I (Greece)
- Order of Diplomatic Service Merit with gold star (Korea)
- Order of the Lion and the Sun, grade 1 (Iran)
- Distinguished Service Order (United Kingdom)
- Legion of Honor (France)
- Croix de Guerre with palm (France)
- Croix de Guerre with palm (Belgium)
- Grand Cross of the Order of Orange Nassau with swords (Netherlands)
- Order of Boyaca (Colombia)

Also decorations from the following countries:

- Ethiopia
- Thailand
- Philippines
- Republic of China

== Promotions ==
| No insignia | Cadet, United States Military Academy: 14 June 1911 |
| No insignia in 1915 | Second Lieutenant, United States Army: 12 June 1915 |
| | First Lieutenant, United States Army: 1 July 1916 |
| | Captain, United States Army: 15 May 1917 |
| | Major, National Army: 17 June 1918 |
| | Major, Regular Army: 2 July 1920 |
| | Captain, Regular Army: 4 November 1922 |
| | Major, Regular Army: 6 December 1924 |
| | Lieutenant Colonel, Regular Army: 1 October 1936 |
| | Colonel, Army of the United States: 26 June 1941 |
| | Colonel, Regular Army: 1 February 1944 |
| | Brigadier General, Army of the United States: 1 August 1944 |
| | Major General, Army of the United States: 15 November 1944 |
| | Brigadier General, Regular Army: 27 June 1946 |
| | Major General, Regular Army: 24 January 1948 |
| | Lieutenant General, Army of the United States: 19 February 1948 |
| | General, Army of the United States: 31 July 1951 |
| | General, Retired List: 31 March 1953 |

== Head coaching record ==
| Year | Team | Overall | Conference | Standing | Bowl/playoffs |
|---|---|---|---|---|---|
Florida Gators (Southern Conference) (1923–1924)
| 1923 | Florida | 6–1–2 | 1–0–2 | 2nd | |
| 1924 | Florida | 6–2–2 | 2–0–1 | 3rd | |
| Florida: | | 12–3–4 | 3–0–3 | | |
| Total: | | 12–3–4 | | | |

== See also ==
- List of United States Military Academy alumni
- List of University of Florida faculty and administrators
- List of University of Florida honorary degree recipients
- List of University of Florida Athletic Hall of Fame members
- The Korea Society

== Bibliography ==
- 2012 Florida Football Media Guide, University Athletic Association, Gainesville, Florida (2012).
- Braim, Paul F., Will to Win: The Life of General James A. Van Fleet, Naval Institute Press, Annapolis, Maryland (2001).
- Bruce, Robert B., "Tethered Eagle: Lt-General James A. Van Fleet and the Quest for Military Victory in the Korean War, April – June 1951," Army History 82 (Winter 2012).
- Carlson, Norm, University of Florida Football Vault: The History of the Florida Gators, Whitman Publishing, LLC, Atlanta, Georgia (2007). ISBN 0-7948-2298-3.
- Golenbock, Peter, Go Gators! An Oral History of Florida's Pursuit of Gridiron Glory, Legends Publishing, LLC, St. Petersburg, Florida (2002). ISBN 0-9650782-1-3.
- McCarthy, Kevin M., Fightin' Gators: A History of University of Florida Football, Arcadia Publishing, Mount Pleasant, South Carolina (2000). ISBN 978-0-7385-0559-6.
- McEwen, Tom, The Gators: A Story of Florida Football, The Strode Publishers, Huntsville, Alabama (1974). ISBN 0-87397-025-X.
- Nash, Noel, ed., The Gainesville Sun Presents The Greatest Moments in Florida Gators Football, Sports Publishing, Inc., Champaign, Illinois (1998). ISBN 1-57167-196-X.
- Proctor, Samuel, & Wright Langley, Gator History: A Pictorial History of the University of Florida, South Star Publishing Company, Gainesville, Florida (1986). ISBN 0-938637-00-2.
- Taaffe, Stephen R. (2013). Marshall and His Generals: U.S. Army Commanders in World War II. Lawrence, Kansas: University Press of Kansas. ISBN 978-0-7006-1942-9. OCLC 840162019.

Military offices
| Preceded by Raymond O. Barton | Commanding General 4th Infantry Division; September–October 1944 | Succeeded by Raymond O. Barton |
| Preceded by Raymond S. McLain | Commanding General 90th Infantry Division; 1944–1945 | Succeeded by Lowell Ward Rooks |
| Preceded by James I. Muir | Commanding General XXIII Corps; February–March 1945 | Succeeded by Hugh J. Gaffey |
| Preceded by John Millikin | Commanding General III Corps; 1945–1946 | Succeeded by Ira T. Wyche |
| Preceded by Leonard T. Gerow | Commanding General Second United States Army; 1950–1951 | Succeeded by Edward H. Brooks |
| Preceded by Matthew Ridgway | Commanding General Eighth United States Army; 1951–1953 | Succeeded by Maxwell D. Taylor |
