= Edwin P. Parker Jr. =

U.S. Army major general

Edwin Pearson Parker Jr.
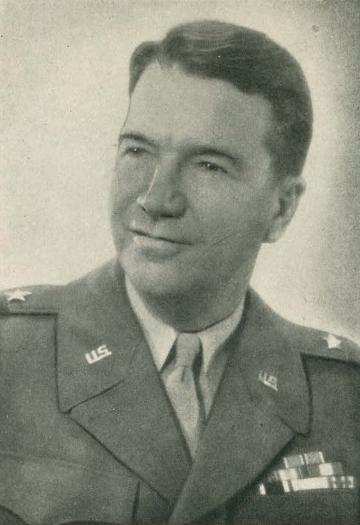
- Born: July 27, 1891; Wytheville, Virginia, U.S.
- Died: June 7, 1983 (aged 91); Washington, D.C., U.S.
- Military career
- Allegiance: United States
- Branch: United States Army
- Service years: 1912–1953
- Rank: Major General
- Service number: 0-3457
- Unit: Field Artillery Branch
- Commands: Provost Marshal General; XXIII Corps; 78th Infantry Division; 2nd Battalion, 83rd Field Artillery Regiment
- Conflicts: Pancho Villa Expedition; World War I; World War II; Battle of the Bulge; Battle of Hürtgen Forest; Battle of Kesternich; Battle of Remagen; Ruhr Pocket
- Awards: Army Distinguished Service Medal; Silver Star; Legion of Merit; Bronze Star (2)

Edwin Pearson Parker Jr. (July 27, 1891 – June 7, 1983) was a senior officer in the United States Army. Parker commanded the 78th Infantry Division during the Ardennes-Alsace, Rhineland, and Central Europe, campaigns of World War II. Under his command, the division, nicknamed "Lightning", helped secure the Ludendorff Bridge during the Battle of Remagen.

Following the war, Parker commanded XXIII Corps during the occupation duties in Germany and completed his career as U.S. Army Provost Marshal General from 1948 to 1953.

== Early career ==
Parker was born on July 27, 1891, in Wytheville, Virginia, as the son of Edwin Pearson Parker and Mary Lillington Hardin. He graduated from the old Western High School and subsequently attended George Washington University. Upon the graduation in summer 1912, he was commissioned in the Field Artillery Branch of the United States Army. Parker was stationed on the Mexican Border during the Pancho Villa Expedition and during World War I, he was stationed at the Panama Canal Zone and saw no service overseas.

Following the armistice with Germany in November 1918, he was ordered to France and took part in the occupation of the Rhineland. Parker was later ordered back to the United States and served as an assistant professor of military science and tactics, first at Ohio State University, and then at Harvard University.

Parker was ordered to the Army Field Artillery School at Fort Sill, Oklahoma, in May 1923 and completed the Field Artillery Officers' Advance Course one year later. Upon the completion of the course, he was sent to the course at the U.S. Army Command and General Staff College at Fort Leavenworth, Kansas, and graduated in June 1925.

He published many articles about field artillery innovations in The Field Artillery Journal and gained a reputation as an artillery expert. Parker later served as an instructor at the Army Field Artillery School at Fort Sill and in mid-1933, he was appointed Training officer in the Office of the Chief of Field Artillery and served successively under Major General Harry G. Bishop and later Major General Upton Birnie Jr.

On August 1, 1935, Parker was promoted to lieutenant colonel and was ordered to Fort Bragg, North Carolina, for duty as commanding officer (CO) of the 2nd Battalion, 83rd Field Artillery Regiment. After one year in this capacity, he was ordered to Washington, D.C., where he entered the instruction at U.S. Army War College, which he completed in June 1937.

== World War II ==
On June 26, 1941, Parker was promoted to the temporary rank of colonel and appointed commandant of the Field Artillery Replacement Training Center at Fort Bragg. He was again promoted just a few months later, this time to the temporary rank of brigadier general on October 31, 1941, and was responsible for the training of artillery men until June 1942. By this time the United States had entered World War II. On June 21, 1942, Parker was subsequently promoted to the temporary rank of major general and, despite being an artilleryman, was ordered to Camp Butner, North Carolina, where he was tasked with the activation of the 78th Infantry Division. Aiding him during this period was his assistant division commander (ADC), Brigadier General William Kelly Harrison Jr. until early January 1943 when he was replaced by Brigadier General John K. Rice, who remained in this post for the rest of the war. On July 1, 1942, Parker's rank in the Regular Army was promoted from lieutenant colonel to colonel.

Due to his previous experiences with training at the Field Artillery Training Center at Fort Bragg, Parker supervised the formation and received a special assignment from the War Department General Staff. Parker was responsible for the training and processing of combat replacements in the shortest possible time. Under his supervision, the 78th Division trained between 40,000 and 50,000 replacements, who were sent to war in both theaters and to stations all over the world.

In March 1943, Parker's division began with its own intensive combat training and he led his command during the maneuvers in South Carolina during November 1943 and Tennessee in January–February 1944. The 78th Division then conducted intensive training for several months and parts of the division participated in the restoring of order during the Philadelphia transit strike at the beginning of August 1944.

The 78th Division finally embarked for European Theater and arrived to England on October 14, 1944. It was stationed near Bournemouth for four weeks and was ordered to the Tongres area, Belgium by the end of November as the part of reserve force of Ninth Army. On December 5, 78th Division was attached to the V Corps, First Army and order to the vicinity of Entenpfuhl, where it relieved elements of the 1st Infantry Division.

Parker then received orders to advanced into Simmerath, Witzerath, and Bikerath and attacked the village of Kesternich on the Siegfried Line. It was a bloody baptism of fire for the inexperienced 78th division. During the seven days of fighting for the village between December 13 and 19, the 78th Infantry Division lost approximately 1,515 dead, wounded, missing and injured, according to the division's records. German losses in dead and captured, as confirmed by the 78th Infantry Division, were approximately 770, not counting wounded or missing.

The 78th held the area it had taken from the Siegfried Line against the violent German counterattacks throughout the winter. The Division commenced attack on January 30, 1945, and took Kesternich on February 2, 1945. The 78th Division advanced to the town of Schmidt, which captured on February 8, and captured intact the vital Schwammanauel Dam the next day.

Parker and his division then advanced to the Rhine river and participated in the capture of the Ludendorff Bridge during the Battle of Remagen by the beginning of March 1945. He then led 78th Division during the combats in the Ruhr Pocket and his division saw last action with the capture of Wuppertal on April 17, 1945. The 78th Division was then ordered for rest and Nazi Germany surrendered on May 8, 1945.

For his service during World War II, Parker received numerous decorations including the Army Distinguished Service Medal, Silver Star, Legion of Merit and two awards of the Bronze Star. He was also decorated with the Legion of Honour and Croix de Guerre 1939–1945 with Palm by the Government of France and Croix de Guerre with Palm by Belgium.

== Postwar service ==
Following the surrender of Germany, 78th Division conducted occupation duty in the areas of Kassel, Gotha, Fulda, Bad Hersfeld, Mühlhausen, Nordhausen and Marburg and Parker was tasked with the control of German civilian population or repatriation of Prisoners of War and displaced persons, people who had been brought into Germany by Nazis from conquered countries to be used as slave labor. These include men, women and children from Poland, France, Russia, Czechoslovakia, Latvia and other countries overrun by Germany. Parker also began with the preparation for division's possible deployment to the Pacific theater.

In September 1945, Parker was appointed Commanding general, XXIII Corps with headquarters in Idar-Oberstein and units subordinated to the Corps included the 28th Infantry Division, the 54th Anti-Aircraft Artillery Brigade, and the 214th, 425th, and 426th Field Artillery Groups. Following the deactivation of the Corps on February 10, 1946, Parker served as acting Commanding general, Third Army for several months until he was appointed Inspector-General, United States Forces European Theater by the end of August 1946.

He remained in that capacity until end of August 1947, when he was ordered back to the United States and appointed Deputy Commanding General, Fifth United States Army in Chicago, Illinois. Parker served as Deputy to general Walton Walker until April 1948, when he was appointed Provost Marshal of the United States Army.

While in this capacity, he was responsible for the administration of Military Police Corps and also supervised investigations and incarcerations of U.S. Army personnel. Parker regularly inspected U.S. stations all over the world and retired on February 4, 1953, after 41 years of active service.

== Retirement and death ==
Upon his retirement from the Army, Parker settled in Washington, D.C., and worked as the business manager of the St. Albans School for Boys from 1960 to 1970. Parker died on June 7, 1983, aged 91, of congestive heart failure at his home.

His wife, Hannah Somerville Matthews Parker (1893-1998), is buried beside him at Oak Hill Cemetery in Washington. They had four sons: Henry S. (1916-1985), Edwin P. III (1919-2014) and Nicholson (1921-2016), Somerville Parker (1933-2015). Henry earned the medical degree from George Washington University Hospital and reached the rank of colonel in the Army Medical Corps; Edwin III earned his medical degree from the University of Virginia and served as flight surgeon of the Marine Bombing Squadron 612 in the Pacific during World War II and Nicholson graduated from West Point Military Academy in June 1943 and retired as colonel in 1969.

== Decorations ==
Here is Major General Parker's ribbon bar:

1st Row	Army Distinguished Service Medal	Silver Star	Legion of Merit	Bronze Star Medal with Oak Leaf Cluster
2nd Row	Mexican Border Service Medal	World War I Victory Medal	Army of Occupation of Germany Medal	American Defense Service Medal
3rd Row	American Campaign Medal	European-African-Middle Eastern Campaign Medal with three 3/16 inch service stars	World War II Victory Medal	Army of Occupation Medal
4th Row	National Defense Service Medal	Officer of the Legion of Honor (France)	French Croix de guerre 1939-1945 with Palm	Belgian Croix de Guerre with Palm

Military offices
Preceded by Newly activated organization	Commanding General 78th Infantry Division; 1942–1945	Succeeded by Ray W. Barker
Preceded by Frank W. Milburn	Commanding General XXIII Corps; 1945–1946	Succeeded by Post deactivated
Preceded by Blackshear M. Bryan	Provost Marshal of the United States Army; 1948–1953	Succeeded by William H. Maglin
