= USS Capps =

Fletcher-class destroyer

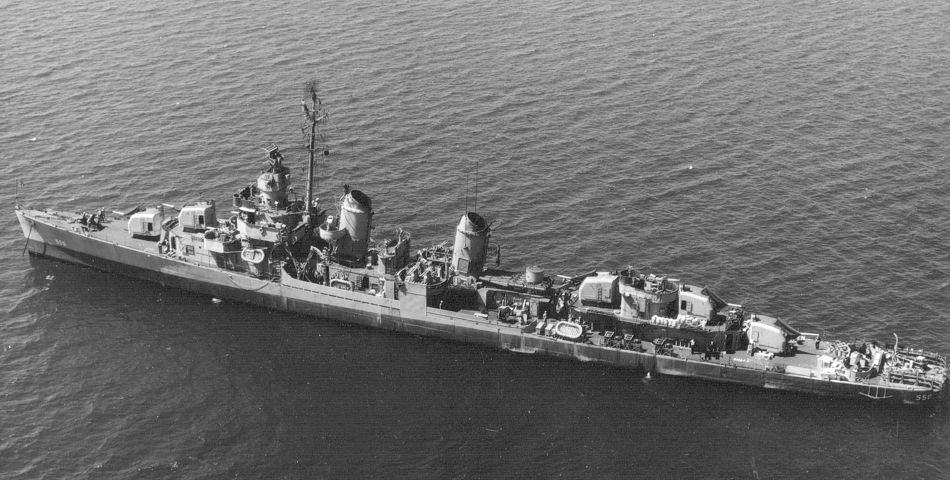
- USS Capps (DD-550) in September 1945

History

United States
- Name: Capps
- Namesake: Washington L. Capps
- Builder: Gulf Shipbuilding Corporation, Chickasaw, Alabama
- Laid down: 12 June 1941
- Launched: 31 May 1942
- Commissioned: 23 June 1943
- Decommissioned: 15 January 1947
- Stricken: 1 October 1972
- Fate: Transferred to Spain, 15 May 1957

Spain
- Name: Lepanto
- Namesake: Battle of Lepanto
- Acquired: 15 May 1957
- Stricken: 31 December 1985
- Fate: Scrapped

General characteristics
- Class & type: Fletcher-class destroyer; Lepanto-class destroyer
- Displacement: 2,050 tons
- Length: 376 ft 6 in (114.76 m)
- Beam: 39 ft 8 in (12.09 m)
- Draft: 17 ft 9 in (5.41 m)
- Propulsion: 60,000 shp (45,000 kW); 2 propellers
- Speed: 35 knots (65 km/h; 40 mph)
- Range: 6,500 nautical miles (12,000 km; 7,500 mi) at 15 knots (28 km/h; 17 mph)
- Complement: 273
- Armament: 5 × single Mk 12 5 in (127 mm)/38 guns; 5 × twin 40 mm (1.6 in) Bofors AA guns; 7 × single 20 mm (0.8 in) Oerlikon AA guns; 2 × quintuple 21 in (533 mm) torpedo tubes; 6 × single depth charge throwers; 2 × depth charge racks

USS Capps (DD-550), a Fletcher-class destroyer, was a ship of the United States Navy named for Rear Admiral Washington L. Capps (1864–1935).

Capps was launched 31 May 1942 by Gulf Shipbuilding Corp., Chickasaw, Ala., sponsored by Mrs. C. G. Stokes; commissioned 23 June 1943 and reported to the Atlantic Fleet.

== Service history ==
=== United States Navy ===
Capps cleared New York 7 September 1943 to begin the operations which would see her fighting the Axis powers on both sides of the world, sailing in convoy for Scapa Flow, Scotland. She arrived 17 September for exercises with the British Home Fleet. In a mixed task force of American and other Allied ships, led by the aircraft carrier Ranger, Capps stood out of Scapa Flow 3 October to cross the Arctic Circle for the first raid on German shipping at Norway's port of Bodø, where coal and iron ore were loaded for Germany. Ships and docks were left burning and sinking, and Capps returned to Scapa Flow unscathed by German air attack. On 7 October, Capps sailed with three other destroyers in a dash to Gibraltar, from which they escorted two British battleships and two aircraft carriers back to Scapa Flow. Thus augmented, the Home Fleet, with Capps in company, swept into northern waters from 29 October to 8 November to guard the movement of a convoy for Murmansk, and to hunt for the German battleships Tirpitz and Scharnhorst.

Capps was detached at Scapa Flow 22 November 1943 and sailed to Boston, arriving 4 December. Twenty days later she got underway for New Orleans, where she joined the escort of a troop convoy bound for Pearl Harbor, arriving 20 January 1944. Guarding another convoy, Capps sailed on to Funafuti, from which she put out for patrol duty off Tarawa, Makin, and Kwajalein as these islands were assaulted to open the Marshall Islands operation. Forced back to San Francisco by a boiler casualty, Capps returned to action at Majuro 23 April, and was assigned to area escort, antisubmarine, and antiaircraft patrols. Convoy duty took her to Pearl Harbor in May, returning to Eniwetok 14 June. Based there, the destroyer screened service forces supporting the invasion of the Marianas, then moved forward to Manus in August to continue operations with the screen of the 3rd Fleet logistics group in the western Carolines operations. The ships whose service forces Capps protected carried out the crucial attacks on Japanese bases which prepared for the Leyte operation, and Capps herself joined the screen of a carrier group for air strikes on Manila on 25 November. She continued her activities with the 3rd Fleet until the close of the year, when she reported for a month of duty on radar picket station, in air-sea rescue, and escorting convoys from Saipan to Guam, Eniwetok, and Ulithi. On 1 February 1945, she reported at Ulithi to train with underwater demolition teams for the invasion of Iwo Jima, for which she sailed 14 February.

Arriving off Iwo Jima 16 February 1945, Capps fired in the intensive preinvasion bombardment. Her underwater demolition teams were skillfully landed and began their work of preparing the beaches for assault, and Capps remained on the firing line for 3 weeks, hurling more than 2,600 five-inch projectiles into the caves and hillsides of the tenaciously defended island. Her antiaircraft guns fought off almost nightly air attacks and bombing raids, and each night almost constant illumination fire was thrown up to prevent surprise attacks ashore.

With only eight days of resupply behind her, Capps sailed in the screen of escort carriers bound for the invasion of Okinawa. For the next 82 days, broken only by 6 hours at anchor in Kerama Retto. Capps sailed through the mined waters south of the Nansei Shoto, guarding the escort carriers, rescuing downed aviators, and fighting back kamikaze attacks. Although a kamikaze exploded close aboard on 3 April 1945, Capps came through the operation unscathed. Ordered back to a stateside overhaul, Capps arrived at San Pedro, Calif., 9 July. She was decommissioned and placed in reserve at Long Beach 15 January 1947, and was loaned to Spain under the Military Assistance Program 15 May 1957.

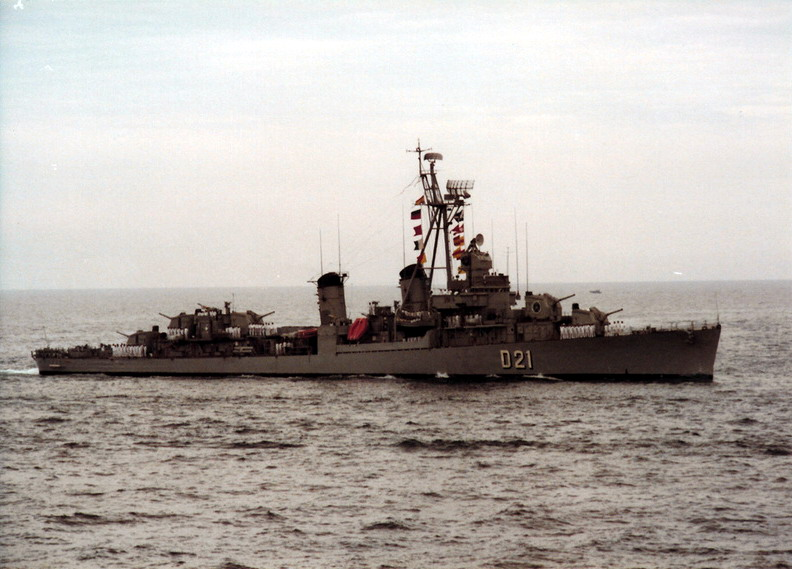
Capps as the Spanish Lepanto (D21).

=== Spanish Navy ===
The ship served in the Spanish Navy as Lepanto (D21), named after the 1571 Battle of Lepanto, in which the Holy League led by Spain defeated the Ottoman Empire. She was stricken 31 December 1985 and scrapped.

== Awards ==
Capps received seven battle stars for her World War II service.
