= O Mundo =

Restaurant in Wageningen, Netherlands

Coordinates: 51°58′3.15″N 5°40′2.8″E

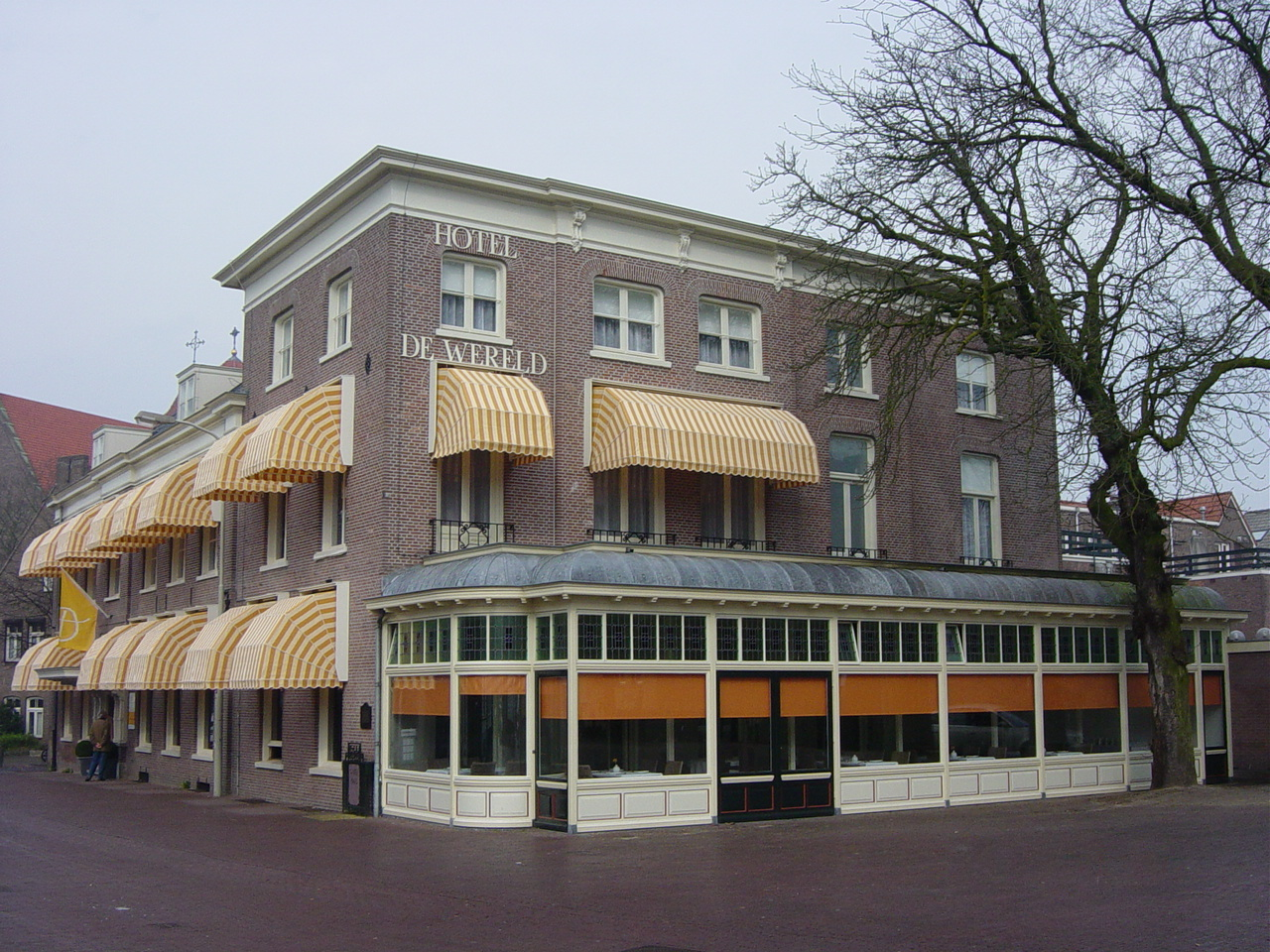
- Interactive map of O Mundo

Restaurant information
- Head chef: Dennis Richter Uitdenbogaardt
- Food type: French, Mediterranean
- Rating: Michelin Guide
- Location: 5 Mei Plein 1, Wageningen, 6703 CD, Netherlands
- Seating capacity: 50
- Website: Official website

O Mundo is a restaurant housed in Hotel de Wereld in Wageningen, The Netherlands. It is a fine dining restaurant that was awarded one Michelin star for the period 2010–2018.

Gault & Millau awarded the restaurant 15 out of 20 points.

O Mundo's head chef is Dennis Richter Uitdenbogaardt, with the help of hotel owner-chef Addie Roelofsen. Baltasar Tieskens, who joined in 2008 from Cordial, was the first chef to earn a star. Richter Uitdenbogaardt took over in 2011, when Tieskens left, and retained the star.

The hotel where the restaurant is housed was the location where Oberbefehlshaber Niederlande German commander-in-chief Generaloberst Johannes Blaskowitz surrendered to I Canadian Corps commander Lieutenant-General Charles Foulkes on 5 May 1945, ending World War II in the Netherlands. The building is owned by the Wageningen University and Research Centre. The hotel was revived in 2002, when Addie Roelofsen took over the hotel (but not the actual building) and renovated the place to modern standards within its historical context. In September 2013, Jaap Venendaal took over the hotel.

O Mundo means "The World" in Portuguese - the same as the hotel's name in Dutch.

== See also ==
- List of Michelin starred restaurants in the Netherlands
