= Flipse =

Flipse is a surname of Dutch origin. Notable people with the surname include:

- Eduard Flipse (1896–1973), Dutch conductor and composer
- Eline Flipse (born 1954), Dutch documentary filmmaker
