= Hotel de Wereld =

Hotel where WWII Nazi German forces in Netherlands capitulated

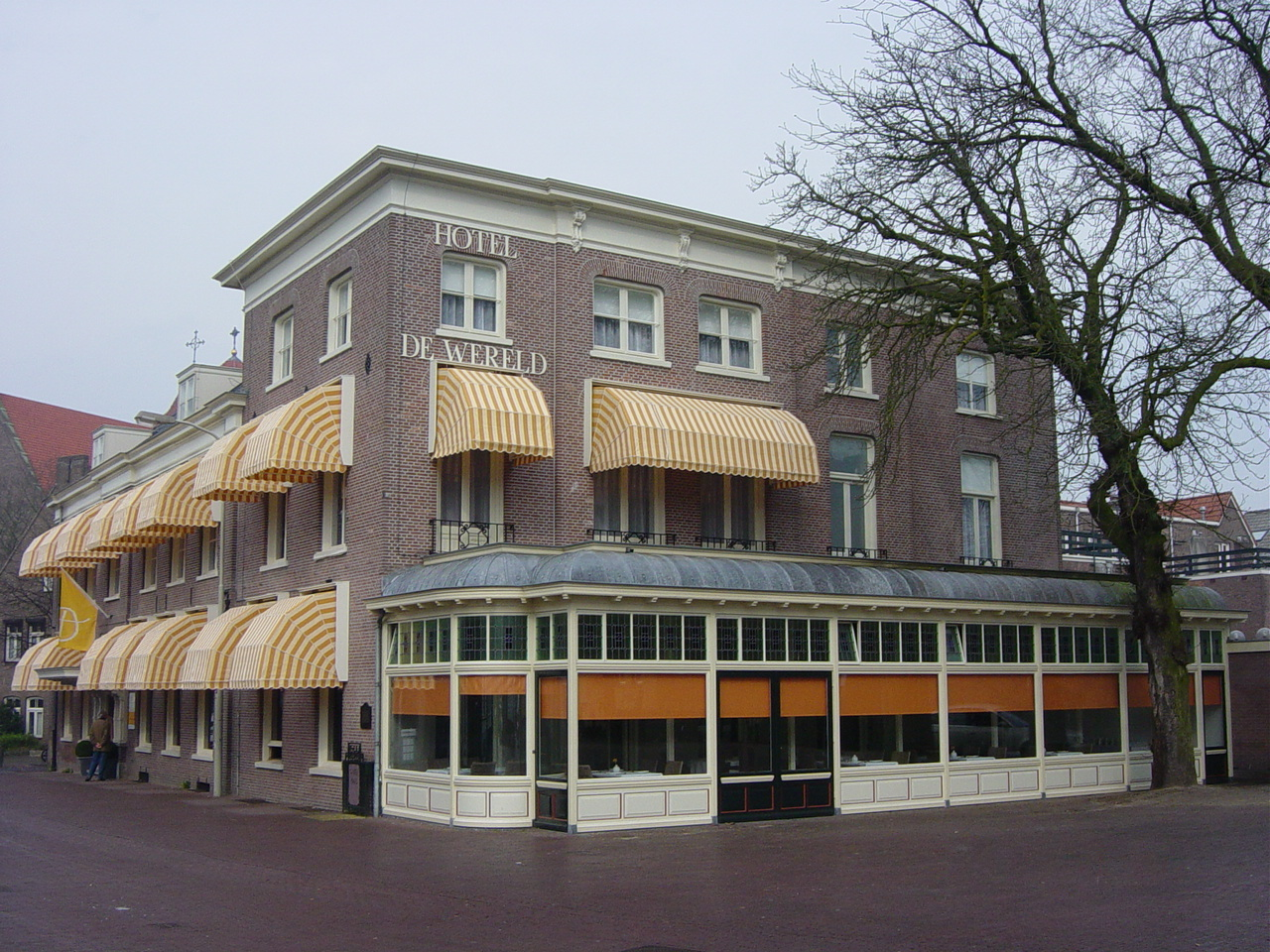
- Hotel de Wereld
- Interactive map of the Hotel de Wereld area

General information
- Location: Wageningen, Netherlands, 5 Mei Plein 1
- Coordinates: 51°58′3″N 5°40′4″E
- Construction started: 1852

Hotel de Wereld (meaning Hotel The World) is a 4-star hotel in Wageningen. It was the site of the capitulation of the German troops in the Netherlands on 5 May 1945, marking the end of German occupation during World War II.

Oberbefehlshaber Niederlande supreme commander Generaloberst Johannes Blaskowitz surrendered to I Canadian Corps commander Lieutenant-General Charles Foulkes at the hotel. The capitulation document was signed the next day (no typewriter had been available the prior day) in the auditorium of Rijks Landbouw Hoogeschool, located next door.

This historic event is celebrated every May 5 as Netherlands' Liberation Day national holiday.

== History ==
In 1669 Jacob Meijnsen had a hotel outside the city gates of Wageningen. It was a stopping place between Utrecht and Arnhem. The inn appears on a map of Gerard Passevant in 1676. In 1814 the oldest painting of the hotel was made, this painting was commissioned by Gerrit Steuk when he became the owner of the inn. In 1852 a new hotel was built (current building) on the foundations of the old inn. In 1872 a new three-story extension was built.

The building was restored in 2004 and has functioned as a hotel and restaurant since. The restaurant, O Mundo, was awarded a star in the Michelin Guide in 2010, losing said star in 2018.

== World War II background ==
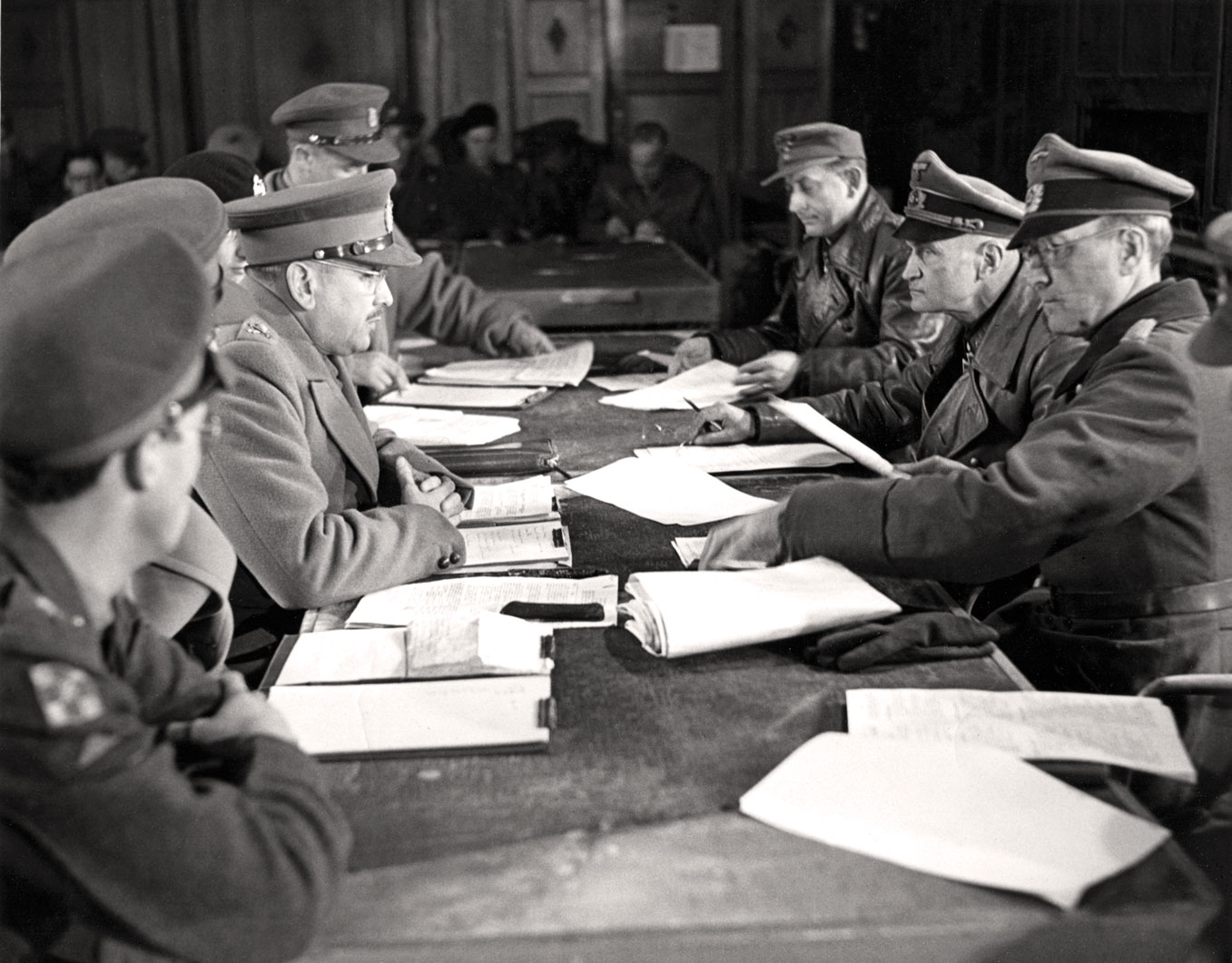
German Generaloberst Johannes Blaskowitz (center right) surrenders the Netherlands to Canadian Lieutenant-General Charles Foulkes (center left) at Hotel de Wereld on 5 May 1945

When British Field Marshal Montgomery reached Lübeck and the Baltic Sea in the beginning of May 1945, the German troops in Denmark and part of the Netherlands were isolated from their homebase. Without major fights, they surrendered to Montgomery on May 4 at Lüneburg Heath.

On 5 May 1945 the negotiation for the surrender of the Germans in the Netherlands took place in the hotel. I Canadian Corps commander Lieutenant-General Charles Foulkes, accompanied by Canadian Brigadier-General George Kitching and Prince Bernhard of the Netherlands, accepted the capitulation of Oberbefehlshaber Niederlande German commander-in-chief Generaloberst Johannes Blaskowitz, who was accompanied by German Generalleutnant Paul Reichelt. On 6 May 1945 (no typewriter had been available the previous day), the official signing of the capitulation document took place in the auditorium of Rijks Landbouw Hoogeschool, next door to the hotel. The pen used to sign can be seen in the local museum the Casteelse poort (English: Castles gate).

By 1975 the hotel was fully restored. The restored hotel was opened by H.R.H. Prince Bernhard, who represented the Netherlands at the capitulation in 1945.

On 8 July 1945 a bronze plaque was attached to the wall of the hotel by the Canadians. On 9 July Prince Bernhard unveiled the plaque which was given by General Foulkes to remember the capitulation act signed in Wageningen.

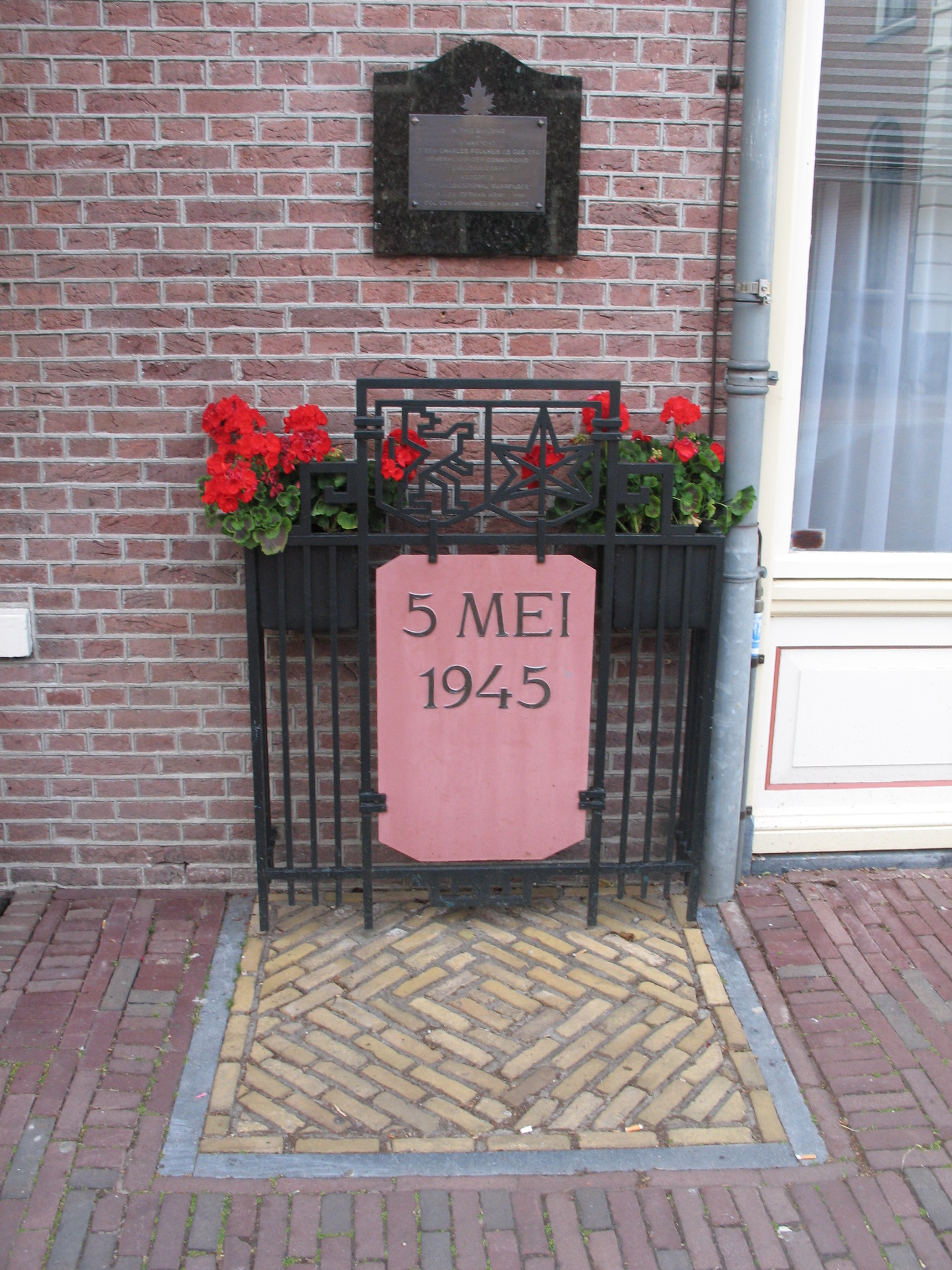
Monument for the Capitulation

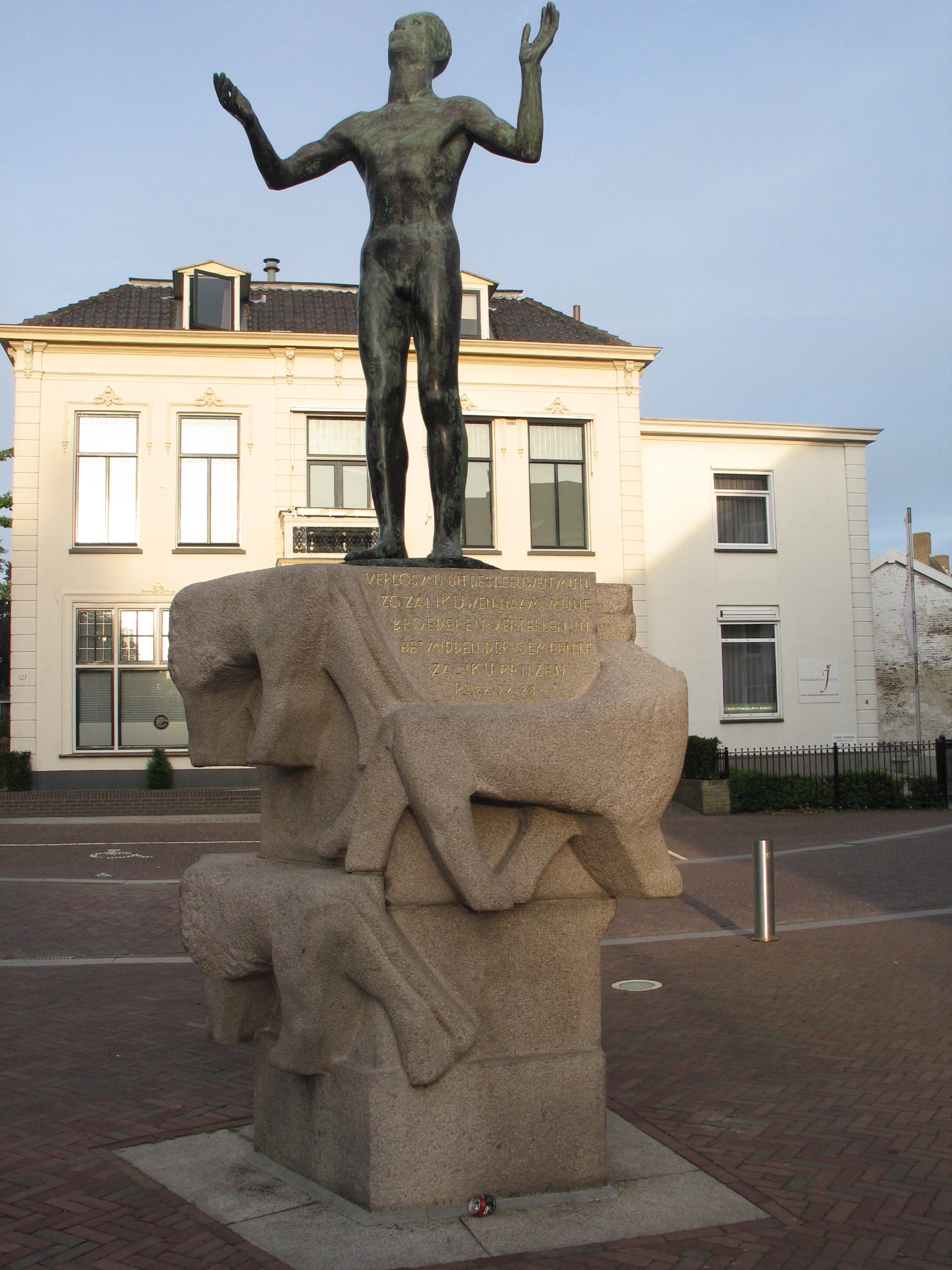
Monument for Liberty

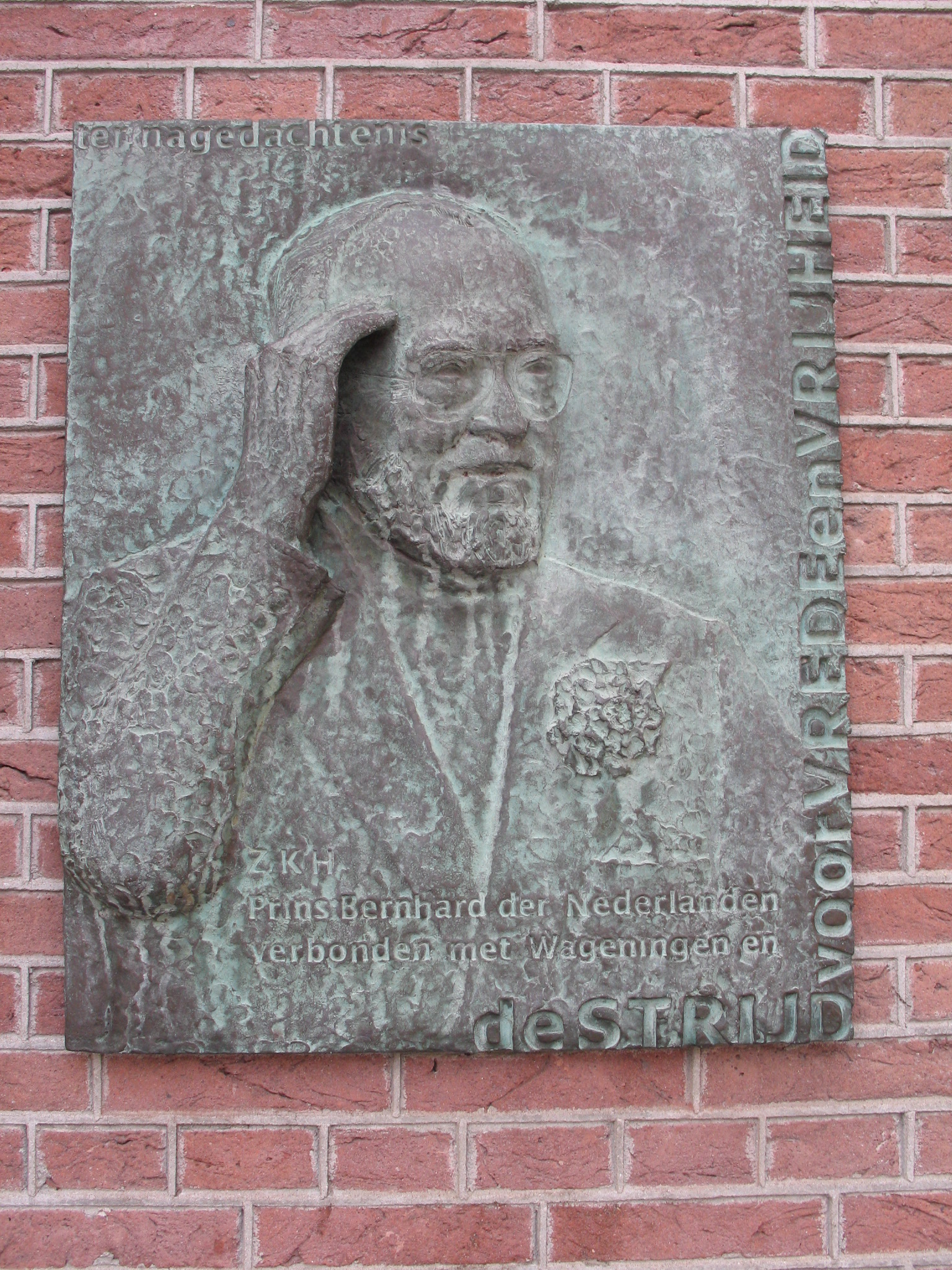
Monument for Prince Bernard
