= Bolshaya Polyana, Kaliningrad Oblast =

Bolshaya Polyana Больша́я Поля́на
- Rural locality
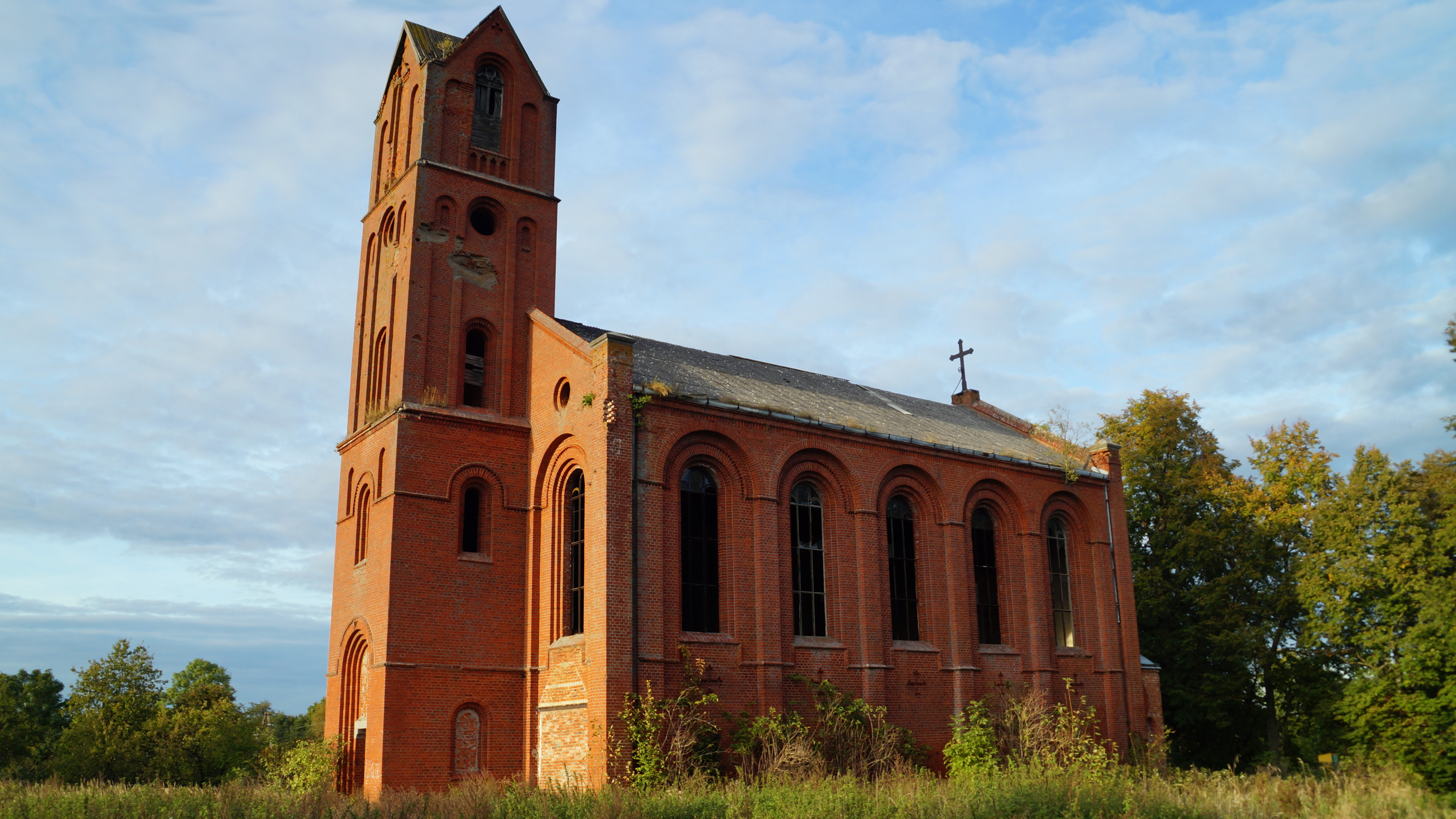
- Church ruins
- Interactive map of Bolshaya Polyana
- Location of Bolshaya Polyana Bolshaya Polyana (European Russia) Bolshaya Polyana (Russia)
- Coordinates: 54°36′N 21°13′E
- Country: Russia
- Federal subject: Kaliningrad Oblast
- Founded: 1363 (Julian)

Population
  - Estimate (2010): 298 )
- Time zone: UTC+2 (MSK–1)
- Postal code: 238200
- OKTMO ID: 27706000111

Bolshaya Polyana (Russian: Больша́я Поля́на, German: Paterswalde, Lithuanian: Petragirė) is a rural locality (a settlement) in Znamensky Rural Okrug of Gvardeysky District in Kaliningrad Oblast, Russia.

== Notable people ==
- Johannes Blaskowitz (1883–1948) German Wehrmacht colonel general during World War II
