= Laura Hospes =

Dutch photographer (born 1994)

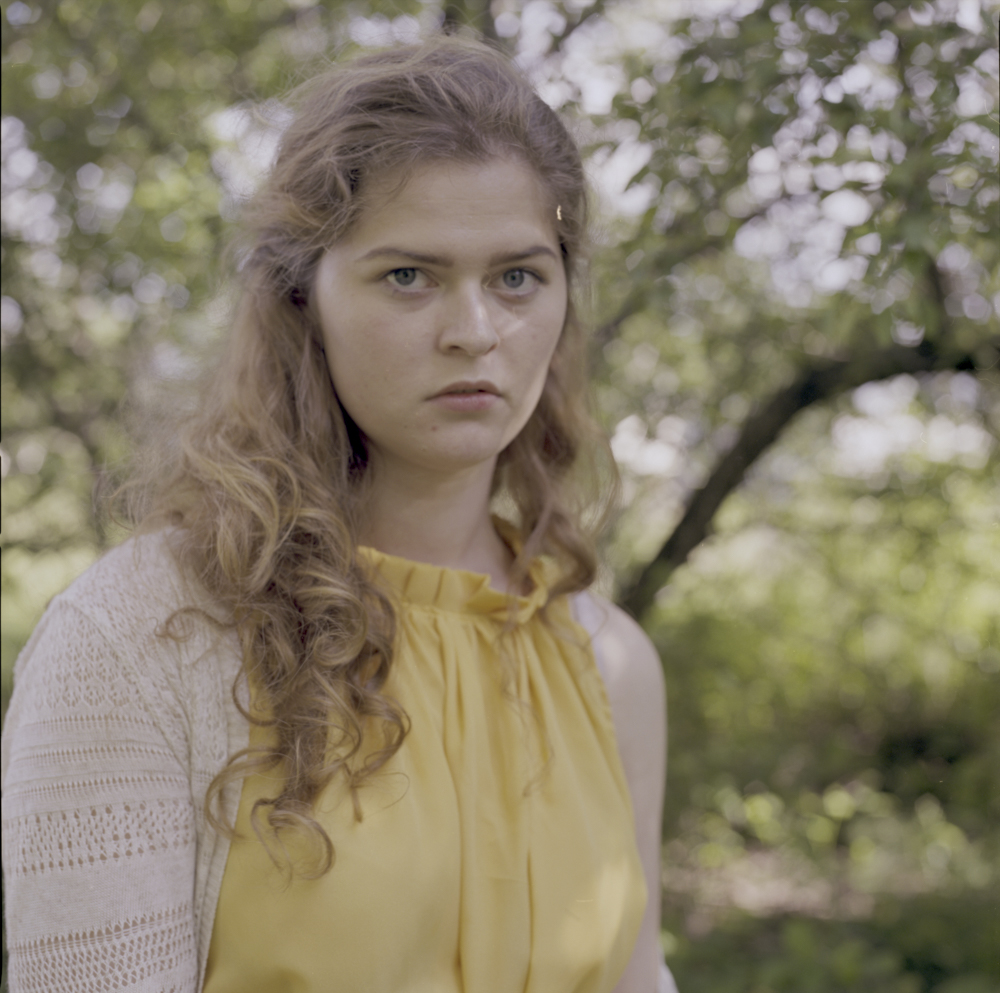
- Born: 1994 (age 30–31); Wageningen, Netherlands
- Occupation: Photographer

Laura Hospes (born 1994) is a Dutch photographer who specialises in black-and-white self-portraits.

== Early life and education ==
Hospes was born in Wageningen in the Netherlands in 1994. She worked as a part-time model between the ages of 14 and 16, learning how to pose and be photogenic, while accepting her flaws. She started taking self-portraits when she was 16. Between 2014 and 2016 she studied at the Fotoacademie in Amsterdam, where she obtained a bachelor's degree, with honour, in photography and between 2019 and 2021, she attended the St. Joost School of Art and Design in Den Bosch, where she obtained a master's degree in visual arts and post-contemporary practices.

== Career ==
Hospes has suffered from anxiety, depression, loneliness, self-mutilation and an eating disorder. Her self-portraits are a direct reflection of her emotions. She spent time in a psychiatric ward following an attempted suicide and documented this experience with a book of self-portraits called UCP-UMCG, named after the institution she was in, the University Centre for Psychiatry in the University College Groningen. It was chosen as one of the best photo books of 2016 by the Dutch newspaper, de Volkskrant, and was shortlisted as one of the Best Dutch Book Designs in the same year.

In 2015 she was named a grant winner of the LensCulture Emerging Talent Awards and was one of the eight "jurors' picks". This led to several further grants, such as the Jacob Riis Documentary Award, the Young Masters Art Prize, a Zilveren Camera award and a Prix de la Photographie award.

In this age of increasing utter narcissism ....., there’s a mind-numbing amount of self portraiture. It actually frightens me that there are so many people so thoroughly interested in themselves and that they actually think that other people really care ........ However, the brave work by Laura Hospes is a very unique set of self portraits where vanity is the farthest thing from her mind. She is using photography in a way that touches me, making very classic physiologically charged images that actually have a purpose.

— Todd Hido

In 2022, Hospes presented a video installation in Amsterdam in which one saw a naked woman slowly ridding herself of a second skin of clay. In 2024 she had an exhibition in FotoMuseum Den Haag in The Hague called Skin Ego, inspired by her therapy with the French psychoanalyst Didier Anzieu. Her work has been exhibited at SF Camerawork in San Francisco, at the Louvre in Paris, and in Venice, New York City, London, Arles, and Berlin, as well as at the Stedelijk Museum Amsterdam and the Museum Belvédère in Heerenveen, both in the Netherlands. Following her LensCulture award her work appeared in HuffPost, the Daily Mail and on Yahoo, among others.

In 2024 Hospes published a book of photographs called Antidote. The covers were overlaid with silicone applied by hand, so that each book is unique.
