= Willem Rudolfs =

Dutch-born biochemist

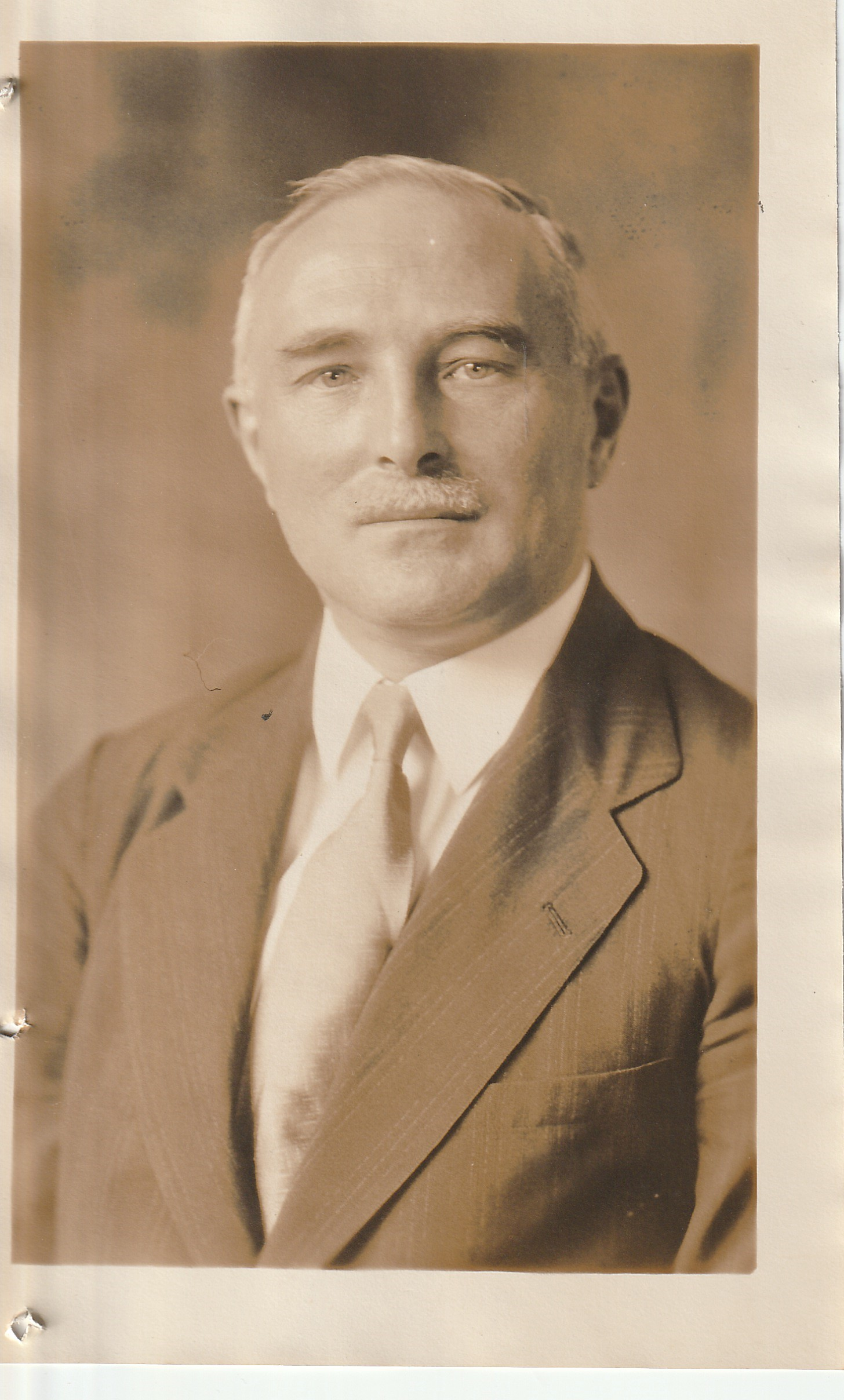
- Born: February 13, 1886; Wageningen
- Died: February 20, 1959 (aged 73); Joppe
- Citizenship: United States, Netherlands
- Education: University of Illinois System; Pasteur-instituut; Rutgers University
- Scientific career
- Workplaces: New Jersey Agricultural Experiment Station, Rutgers University
- Thesis: Experimental studies on sulfur oxidation by micro-organisms (1921)

Willem Rudolfs (February 13, 1886 – February 20, 1959) was a Dutch-born biochemist in entomology and pioneer in the field of sanitary sciences.

Rudolfs was born in Wageningen, the Netherlands, and moved to the United States. In 1921, he earned his PhD at Rutgers College.

From 1921 to 1925 Rudolfs was a teacher at the Department of Entomology of Rutgers University. In this period, his research as a biochemist in entomology was focused on mosquitos: repelling them from human skin, attracting them so they can be counted, behaviour in different weather conditions.

In his thirty years at the New Jersey Agricultural Experiment Station of Rutgers, Rudolfs became a notable authority on sanitary sciences. He was a member of the Federation of Sewage Works Association, now the Water Environment Federation. This organization now honors exceptional publications with the Rudolfs Industrial Waste Management Medal.

In 1952, Rudolfs retired and moved back to the Netherlands. He held several lectures that inspired the Dutch industry to take on industrial waste water treatment collectively.

== Rudolfs Industrial Waste Management Medal ==
The Rudolfs Industrial Waste Management Medal is an award established in 1949 by the Water Environment Federation (WEF) in honor of Willem Rudolfs, a notable figure in environmental engineering. The medal is awarded to scientists who have made an extraordinary contribution to industrial wastewater management through a significant scientific publication.

The aim of the award is to recognize and promote advancements in the treatment and management of industrial wastewater, thereby contributing to public health and environmental sustainability.

WEF is a global non-profit organization dedicated to water quality and water management. As of 2019, WEF had 33,000 individual members and 75 affiliated member associations worldwide. The federation provides education and training for water professionals to help improve public health and protect the environment.
