= Wageningen =

Municipality in Gelderland, Netherlands

- Municipality
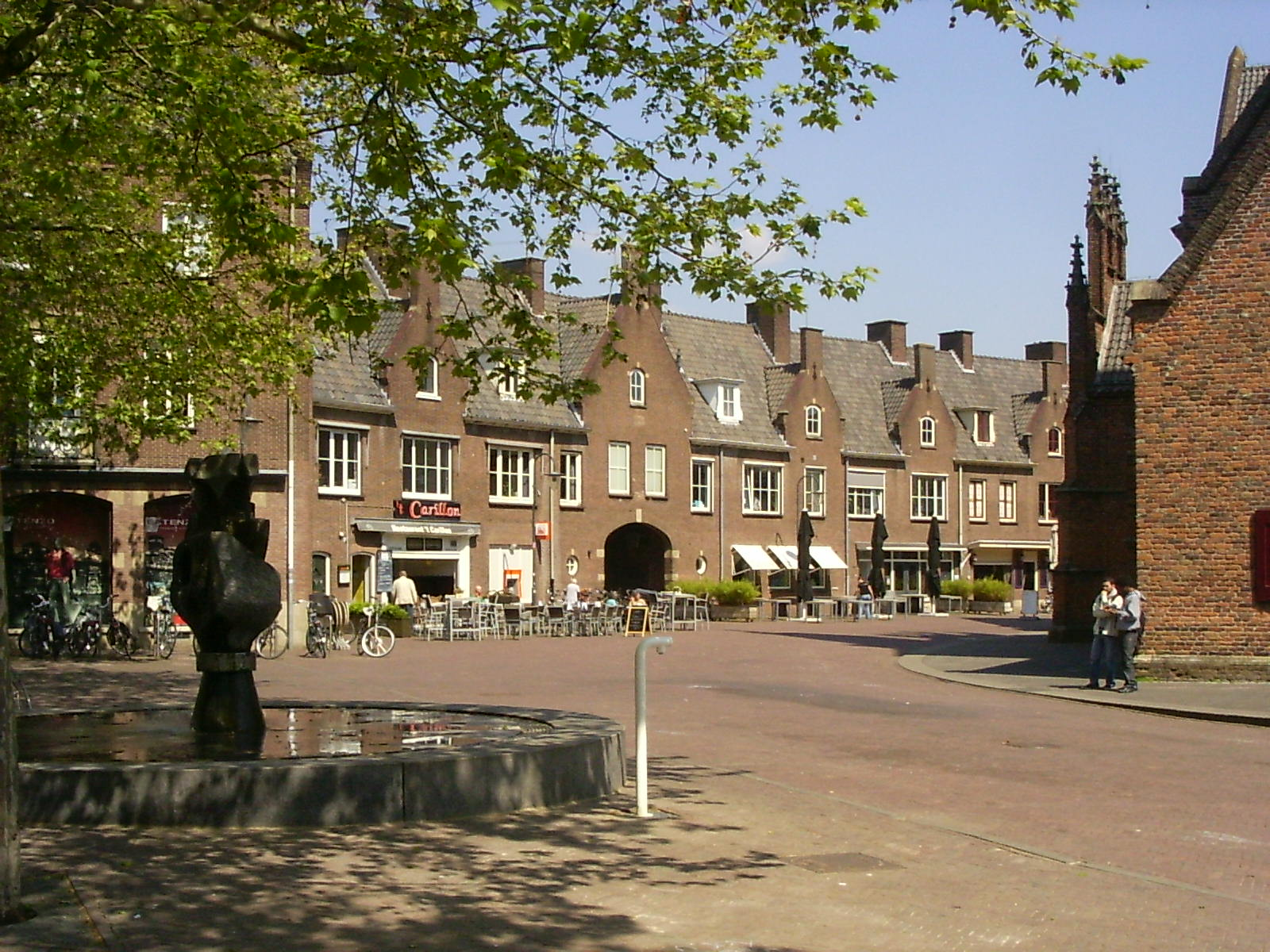
- Wageningen market square

- Flag Coat of arms
- Motto: City of Life Sciences
- Location in Gelderland

- Location within the Netherlands Location within Europe
- Coordinates: 51°58′N 5°40′E
- Country: Netherlands
- Province: Gelderland
- City right: 12 June 1263

Government
  - Body: Municipal council
  - Mayor: Floor Vermeulen (VVD)

Area
  - Total: 32.36 km^{2} (12.49 sq mi)
  - Land: 30.42 km^{2} (11.75 sq mi)
  - Water: 1.94 km^{2} (0.75 sq mi)
- Elevation: 9 m (30 ft)

Population (January 2021)
  - Total: 39,635
  - Density: 1,303/km^{2} (3,370/sq mi)
- Demonym: Wageninger
- Time zone: UTC+1 (CET)
  - Summer (DST): UTC+2 (CEST)
- Postcode: 6700–6709
- Area code: 0317
- Website: www.wageningen.nl

Wageningen (Dutch pronunciation: [ˈʋaːɣənɪŋə(n)]) is a municipality and a historic city in the central Netherlands, in the province of Gelderland. It is famous for Wageningen University, which specialises in life sciences. The municipality had a population of 39,635 in 2021, of which many thousands are students from over 150 countries.

== Demographics ==
=== Inhabitants by nationality ===
71.68% is Dutch, 28.32% has a migration background.

== Geography ==
Wageningen is situated on the north bank of the Nederrijn (the Dutch portion of the Lower Rhine) part of the Gelderse Valley and the Veluwe, of which the southwest hill is called the Wageningse Berg. Wageningen can be reached by car from highways A12 via the N781, A15 via the N233 and N225, and A50 via the N225, and from the Ede-Wageningen railway station via a 20-minute bus drive to the Wageningen central terminal (see below).^{,}

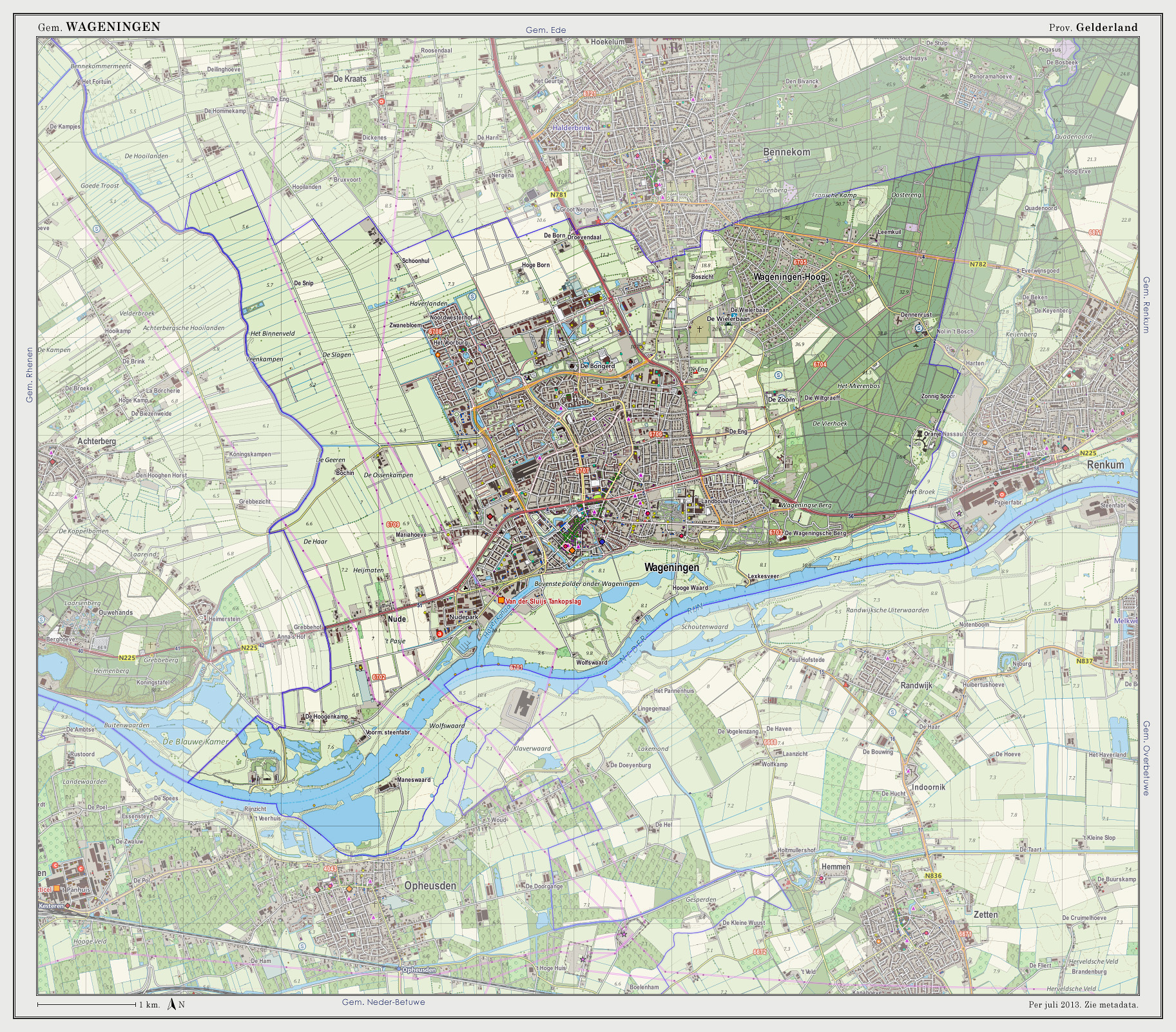

Map of the municipality of Wageningen, July 2013 (click to enlarge)

== History ==
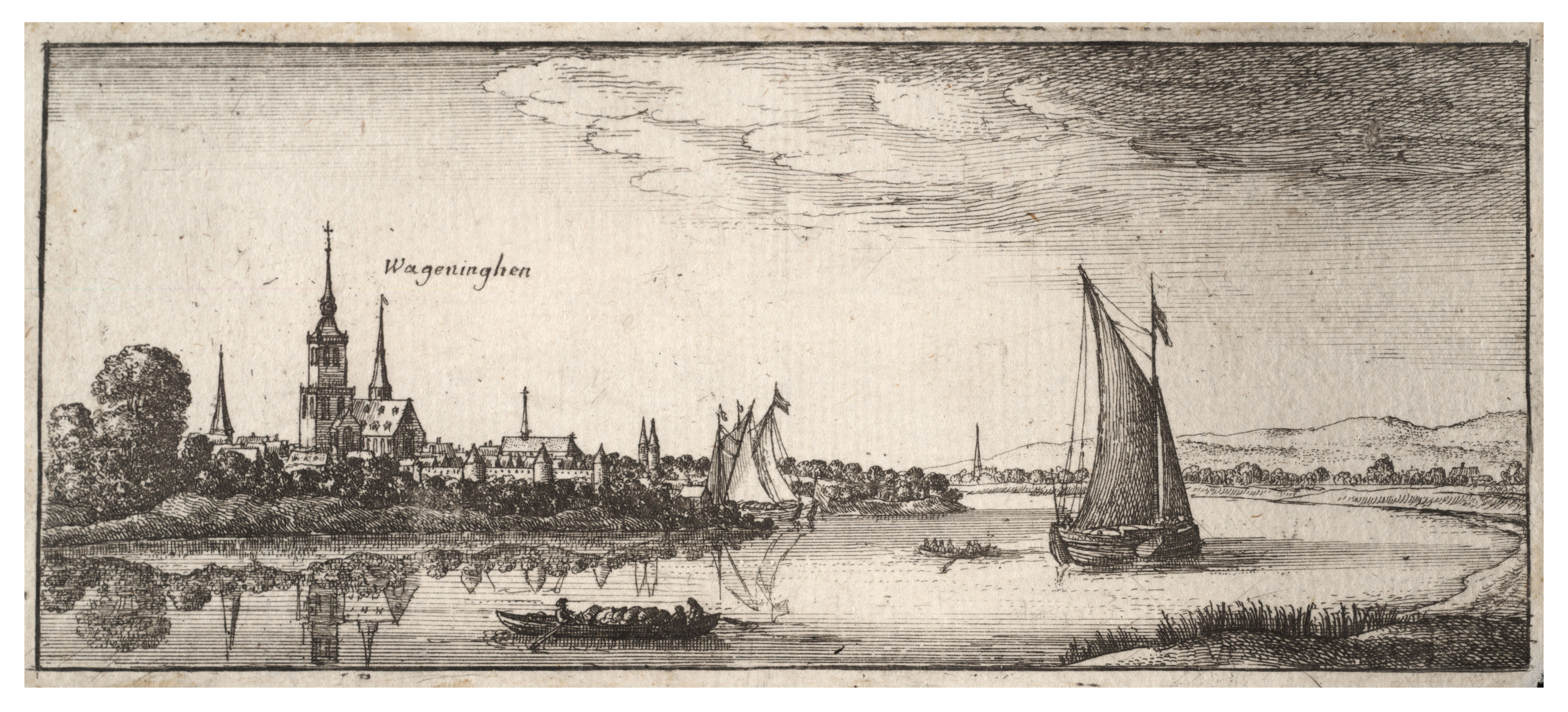
Wageningen in the 17th century

The oldest known settlements in the Wageningen area were located north of today's town centre. They were mentioned as early as 828. During the early Middle Ages a small church was built on the hill east of the town. Several wood farms have been found near the top of the hill. In the twelfth century people settled at what is currently the Bergstraat. Close to Hotel de Wereld a stone floor has been found dating back to this period. After the construction of a dike to protect the city from the acidic water from the moors that then occupied the Gelderse Vallei (the current Hoogstraat), the oldest part of the present city was built to the south. The parts of the city north of the Hoogstraat were built later. Wageningen received city rights in 1263. The city was protected by a city wall and a moat, and in 1526 a castle was built. The castle was dismantled during the 18th century, but the foundations of three of the towers and part of the wall remain visible today.

The people, city, and institutions of Wageningen suffered greatly during World War II. The central part of Wageningen was destroyed by artillery fire soon after the German invasion of the country in May 1940. The town is also famous for its role at the end of the war: Wageningen was the site of the surrender of Oberbefehlshaber Niederlande supreme commander Generaloberst Johannes Blaskowitz, to I Canadian Corps commander Lieutenant-General Charles Foulkes, on 5 May 1945, officially ending the war in the Netherlands. The generals negotiated the terms of surrender in the Hotel de Wereld, near the center of the city. Now, each year on 5 May, celebrated as Liberation Day in the Netherlands, Wageningen hosts a large festival. On this occasion, veteran soldiers parade through the city and are honoured for their service, and around 120,000 people visit the pop-podia around the city.

== Education and research ==
In 1918 the town acquired its first institution of higher education, the Landbouwhogeschool Nederland (Netherlands Agricultural College), which was based on the previous agricultural college founded in 1876, and which later became Wageningen University. This initiated the development from a small historical town into a modern technological community, a process which still continues today.

Wageningen University and Research Centre (WUR), including associated institutes, now employs about 7400 people.

Today, Wageningen is also the central city in Food Valley, the Dutch food and nutrition cluster concentrated around WUR, and comprising many institutes, companies and facilities in the food and nutrition field. Food Valley is regarded as the largest food and nutrition research and development cluster in the world. One such firm, Keygene, a plant research company in Wageningen, developed AFLP in the early 1990s and collaborated with Beijing Genomics Institute to sequence the entire genome of Brassica napus.

== Sports teams ==
The city had its own professional football (soccer) club, FC Wageningen, which won the KNVB Cup twice. The club went bankrupt in 1992 and played its last match in May 1992 against NAC Breda.

The city is also home to the largest Korfball club in the country, KV Wageningen.

== Traffic and transport ==
Wageningen is situated on the N225 provincial road, between Driebergen and Arnhem. The N781 provincial road connects Wageningen to the A12 national highway, to the north of the city. A small ferry (for cars, bikes, and pedestrians) crosses the Nederrijn to the south of the city, at Lexkesveer; from there, drivers can connect to the A15 national highway, via the N836 provincial road.

Several firms provide public bus service in and to Wageningen. From the Wageningen central bus terminal, lines connect to Rhenen, Tiel, Veenendaal, Utrecht, Oosterbeek, and Arnhem, and the Ede-Wageningen railway station. Further connections via bus, including to the Hoge Veluwe National Park and the Kröller-Müller Museum, also may be made at the Ede-Wageningen station. Bus service includes the following:

Line	Route	Carrier	Details
3	Wageningen - Bennekom - Ede - De Klomp	Transdev	Part of the RRReis
41	Wageningen - Rhenen - Kesteren - Lienden - Ommeren - Ingen - Eck en Wiel - Maurik - Zoelmond - Beusichem - Culemborg	Arriva	Part of the RRReis
45	Wageningen - Rhenen - Kersteren - Ochten - IJzendoorn - Echteld - Tiel	Arriva	Part of the RRReis
103	Ede - Wageningen - Renkum - Heelsum - Doorwerth - Heveadorp - Oosterbeek - Arnhem	Transdev	Part of the RRReis
220	Wageningen - Nijmegen	Transdev	Part of the RRReis
303	Ede - Wageningen - Renkum - Heelsum - Oosterbeek - Arnhem - Velp	Transdev	Part of the RRReis
350	Wageningen - Rhenen - Elst - Amerongen - Leersum - Doorn - Driebergen - Zeist - De Bilt - Utrecht CS	Keolis	Part of U-OV
803 - Night bus	Arnhem Centrum → Oosterbeek → Doorwerth → Heelsum → Renkum → Wageningen	Transdev	Part of the RRReis Only Saturday night
808 - Night bus	Ede Centrum → Ede Station → Bennekom → Wageningen	Transdev	Part of the RRReis Only Saturday night
N8 - Night bus	Utrecht Centraal Station → Utrecht Centrum → De Bilt → Zeist → Driebergen Station → Veenendaal → Rhenen → Wageningen (→ Utrecht Centraal Station)	Keolis	Part of U-OV Friday, Saturday and King's night

== Politics ==
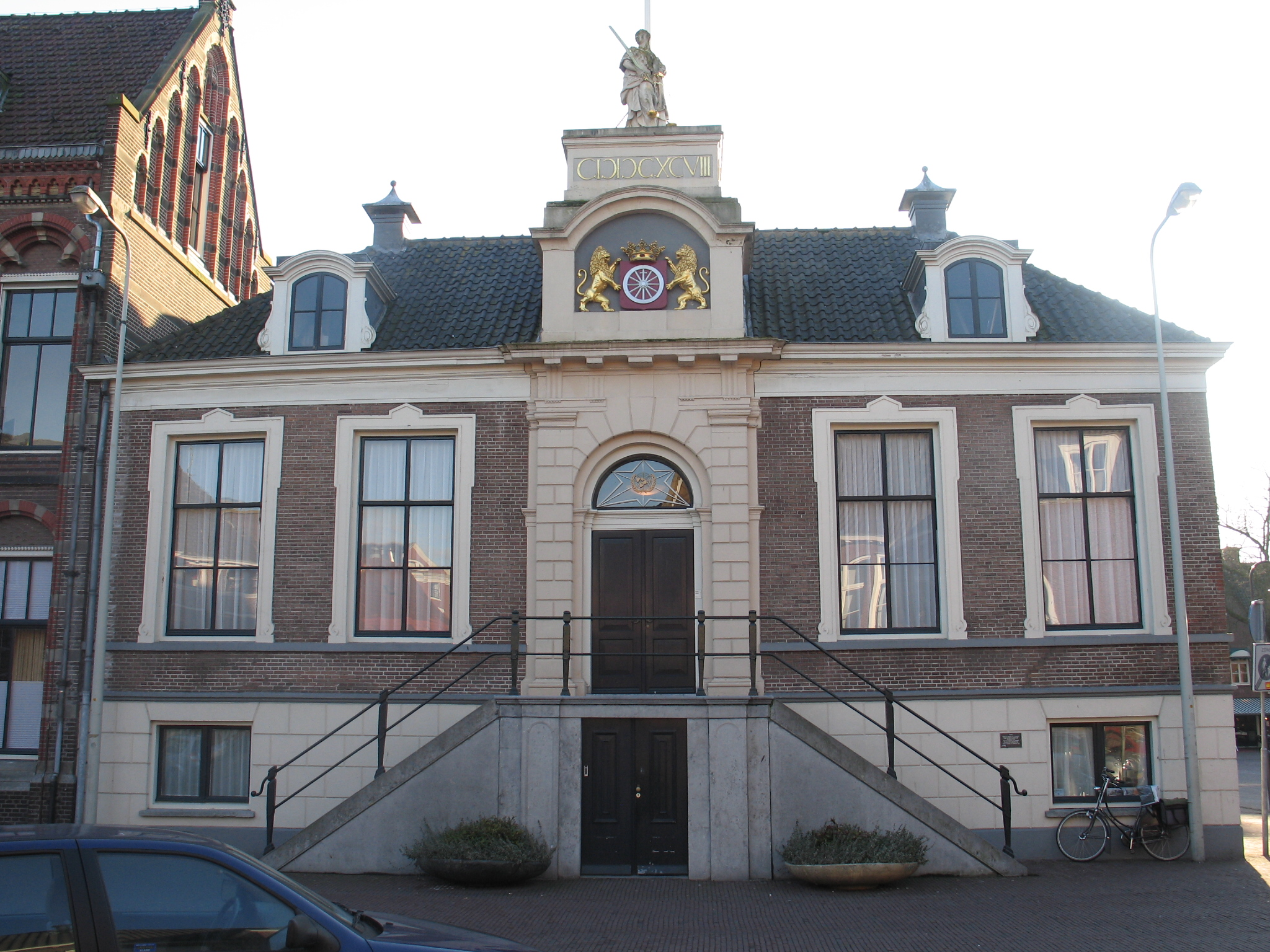
Town hall of Wageningen

=== Municipal council ===
Composition of the Wageningen municipal council since 1982:

Municipal council seats
Party	1990	1994	1998	2002	2006	2010	2014	2018	2022	2026
GroenLinks / PvdA	-	-	-	-	-	-	-	-	-	10
GroenLinks	4	5	6	6	4	5	5	6	8	*
PvdA	6	6	7	6	7	4	3	2	4	*
Stadspartij Wageningen	-	-	-	1	2	2	5	5	4	6
D66	4	4	2	1	2	6	5	5	3	5
Partij voor de Dieren	-	-	-	-	-	-	-	-	-	2
CDA	5	4	3	4	3	3	2	1	1	1
VVD	3	3	4	4	3	3	2	2	2	1
ChristenUnie**	-	-	1	1	1	1	1	1	1	1
Volt / Connect Wageningen	-	-	-	-	-	-	-	2	2	1
SP	-	-	-	-	3	1	2	1	-	-
RPF-SGP	1	1	-	-	-	-	-	-	-	-
Total	23	23	23	23	23	25	25	25	25	27

* Participated in 2026 in a combined GroenLinks/PvdA list.
** Participated in 1998 as a combination of the RPF and the GPV.2026

=== Mayor ===
Wageningen's mayor since June 2021 has been Floor Vermeulen (VVD).

== Notable residents ==
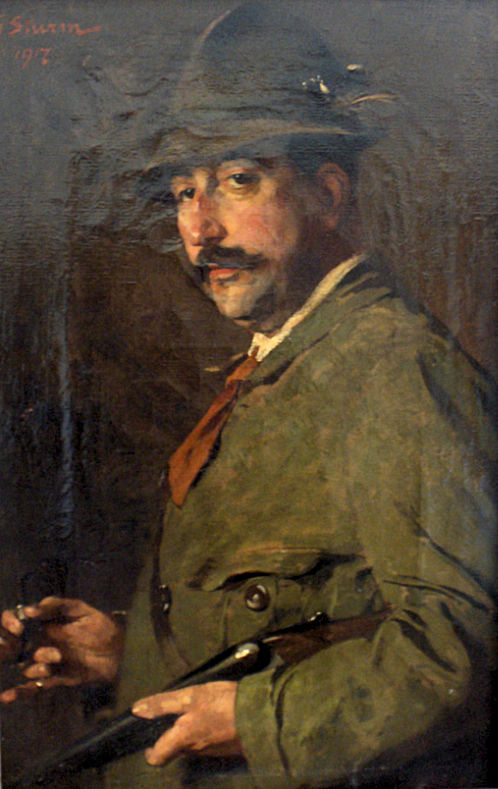
August Falise, 1917

- Johannes de Raey (1622 in Wageningen – 1702) a philosopher, an early Cartesian
- Gerrit Zegelaar (1719 – 1794 in Wageningen) a painter
- August Falise (1875 in Wageningen – 1936) was a sculptor and minter of medals
- Willem Rudolfs (born 1886 in Wageningen – 1959) pioneer in the field of sanitary sciences at Rutgers University.
- Li Edelkoort (born 1950 in Wageningen) a fashion and design trend forecaster
- Eline Flipse (born 1954 in Wageningen) a film director of documentaries
- Alexander Pechtold (born 1965), a politician and former local Mayor, lives in Wageningen
- Jeroen Dijsselbloem (born 1966) a politician and economist, went to Wageningen University 1985/1991
- Lisa Hordijk (born 1987 in Wageningen) a singer, won the second season of X Factor.
- Laura Hospes (born 1994 in Wageningen) a photographer

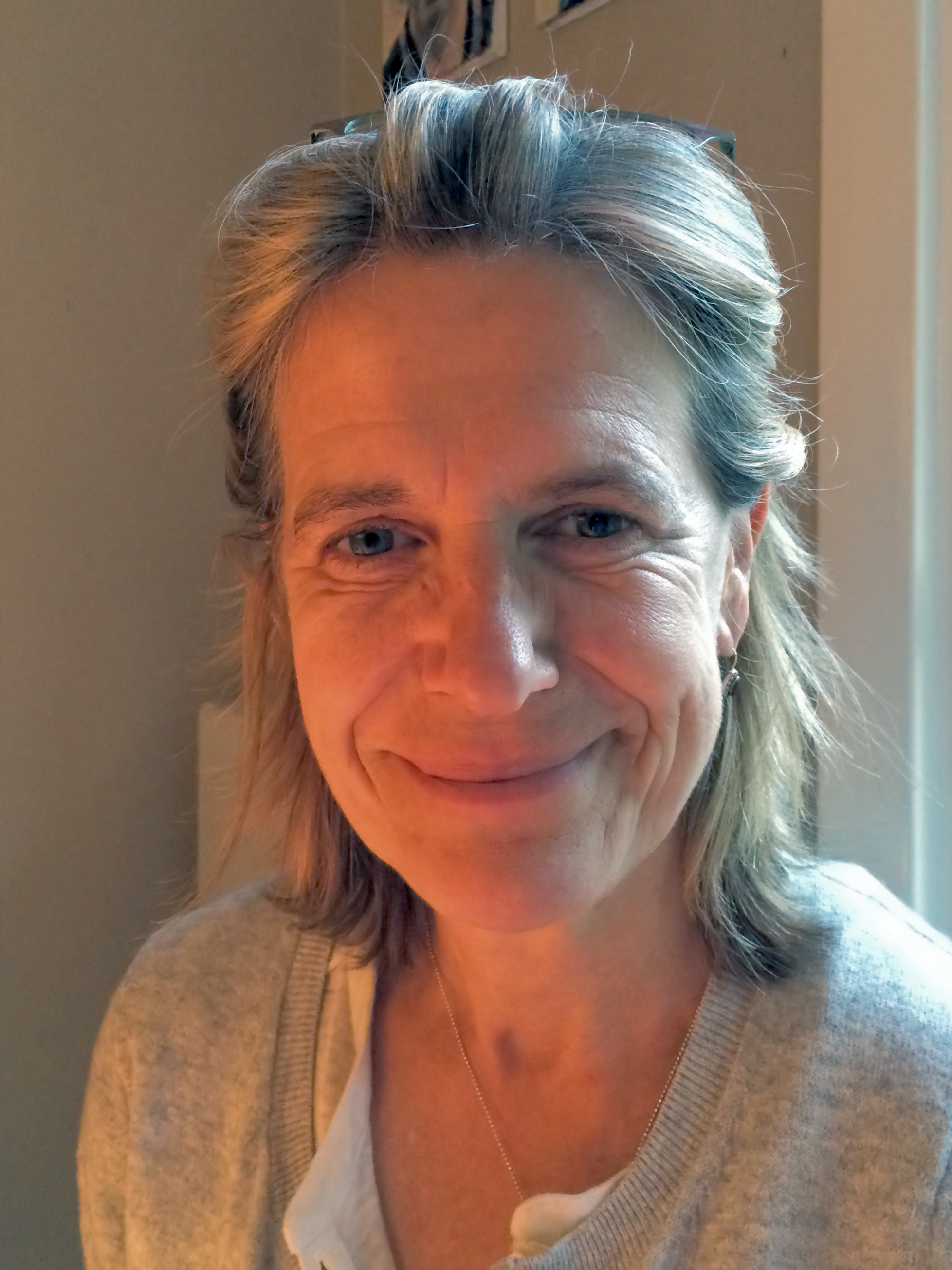
Aletta van Manen, 2014

- Nikkie de Jager (born 1994 in Wageningen) a makeup artist, beauty vlogger, and co-host of Eurovision Song Contest 2021
- Volkert van der Graaf (born 1969 in Middelburg, Zeeland), environmental activist and convicted left-wing terrorist and murderer, attended Wageningen University and lived at the Droevendaal student commune. In 2002, shot and killed politician Pim Fortuyn.

=== Sport ===
- Aletta van Manen (born 1958 in Wageningen) a retired Dutch field hockey defender, team gold medallist at the 1984 Summer Olympics
- Ed van Es (born 1959 in Wageningen) a former water polo player, competed at the 1984 Summer Olympics
- Annelies Maas (born 1960 in Wageningen) freestyle swimmer, bronze medallist at the 1980 Summer Olympics
- Jacqueline Toxopeus (born 1964 in Wageningen) a former Dutch field hockey goalkeeper
- Bart Voskamp (born 1968 in Wageningen) a retired road bicycle racer
- Annemiek van Vleuten (born 1982 in Vleuten) a Dutch road racing cyclist
- Botic van de Zandschulp (born 1995 in Wageningen) a Dutch tennis player, was in the quarterfinals 2021 US Open

== Places of interest ==
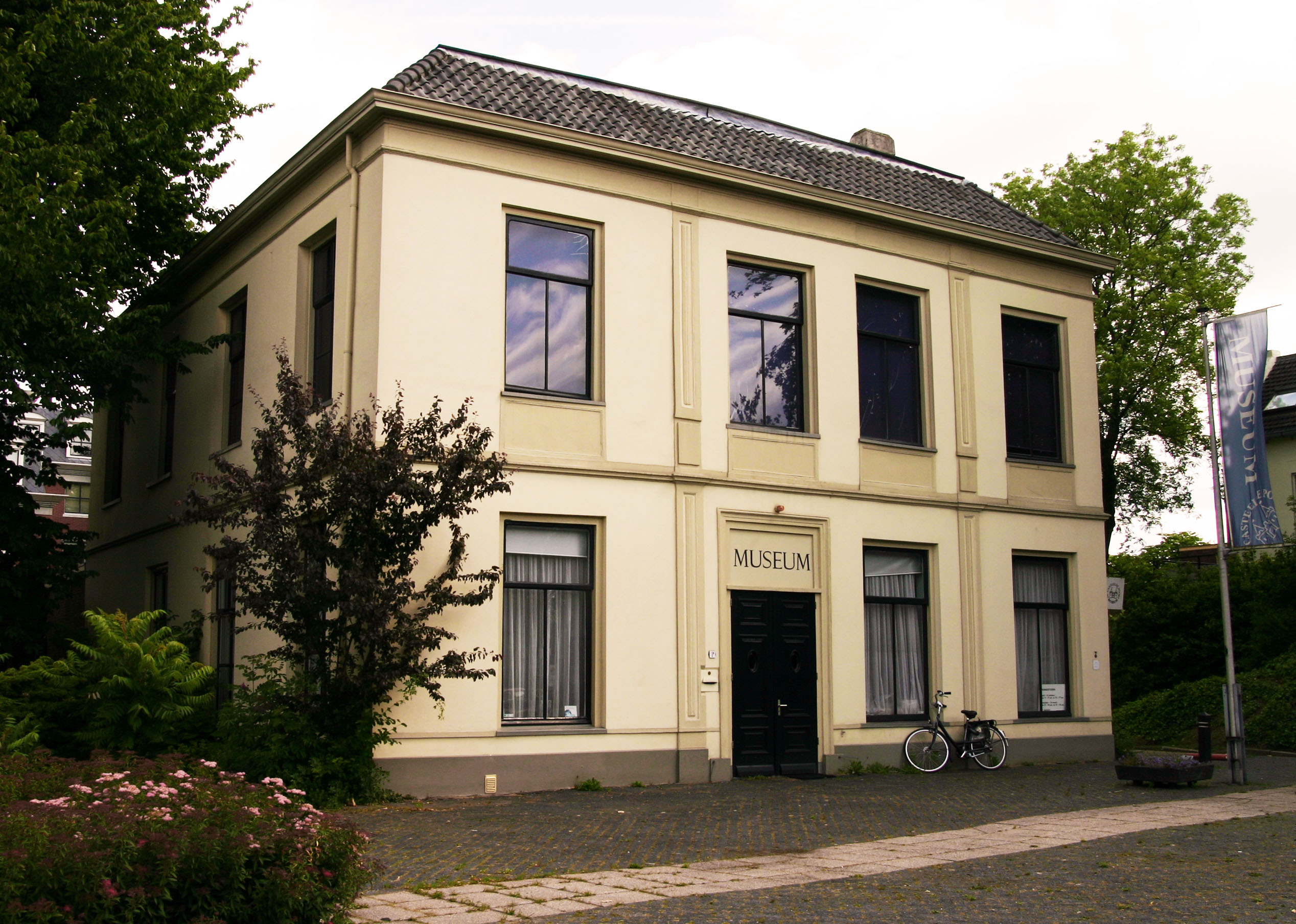
Casteelse Poort Museum

(Including nearby)

- International Club Association
- Airborne Museum 'Hartenstein', Oosterbeek
- Botanical Gardens in Wageningen
- De Casteelse Poort Museum
- Het Depot Museum
- Hoge Veluwe National Park, Ede
- Hotel de Wereld
- Kröller-Müller Museum, Ede/Otterlo
- Netherlands Open Air Museum, Arnhem
- Ouwehands Zoo, Rhenen
- Wageningen University Campus

== Twin towns ==
Wageningen has two twin towns:

- Gödöllő, Hungary and
- Mörfelden-Walldorf, Germany

The city has a project relation with the towns: Zhangzhou, China and Ndiza, (Rwanda).

== Gallery ==
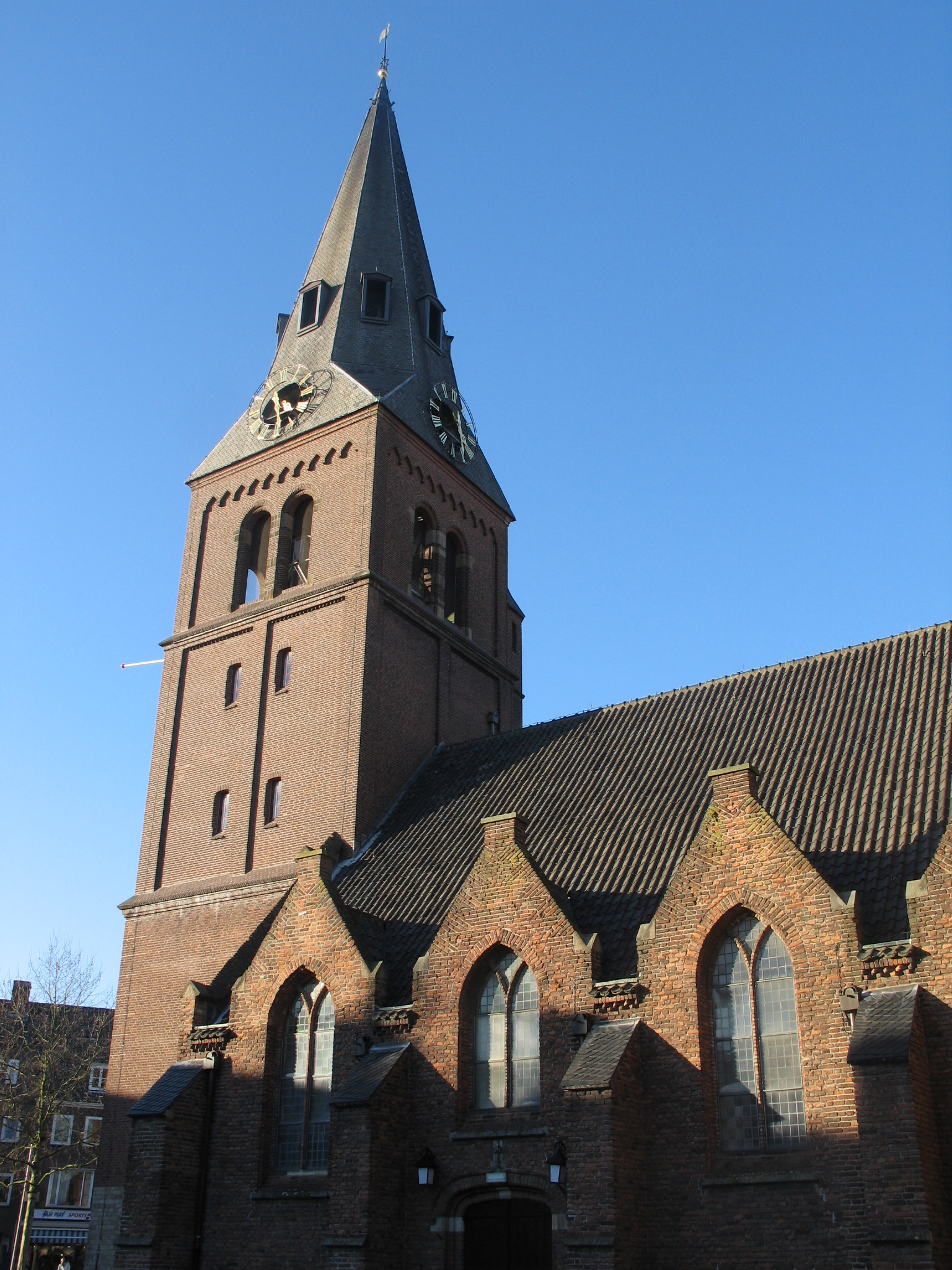
Main church of Wageningen

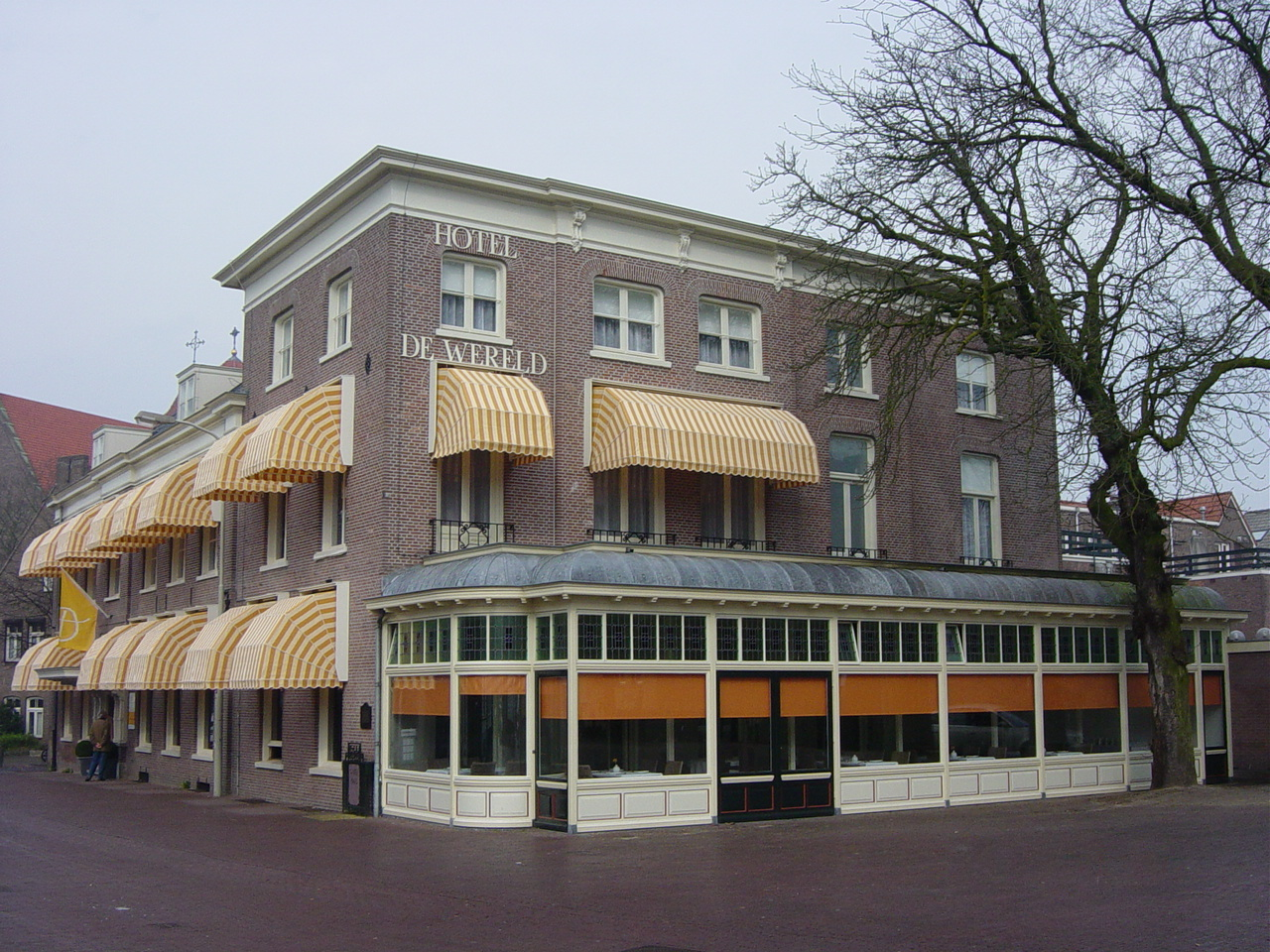
Hotel de Wereld

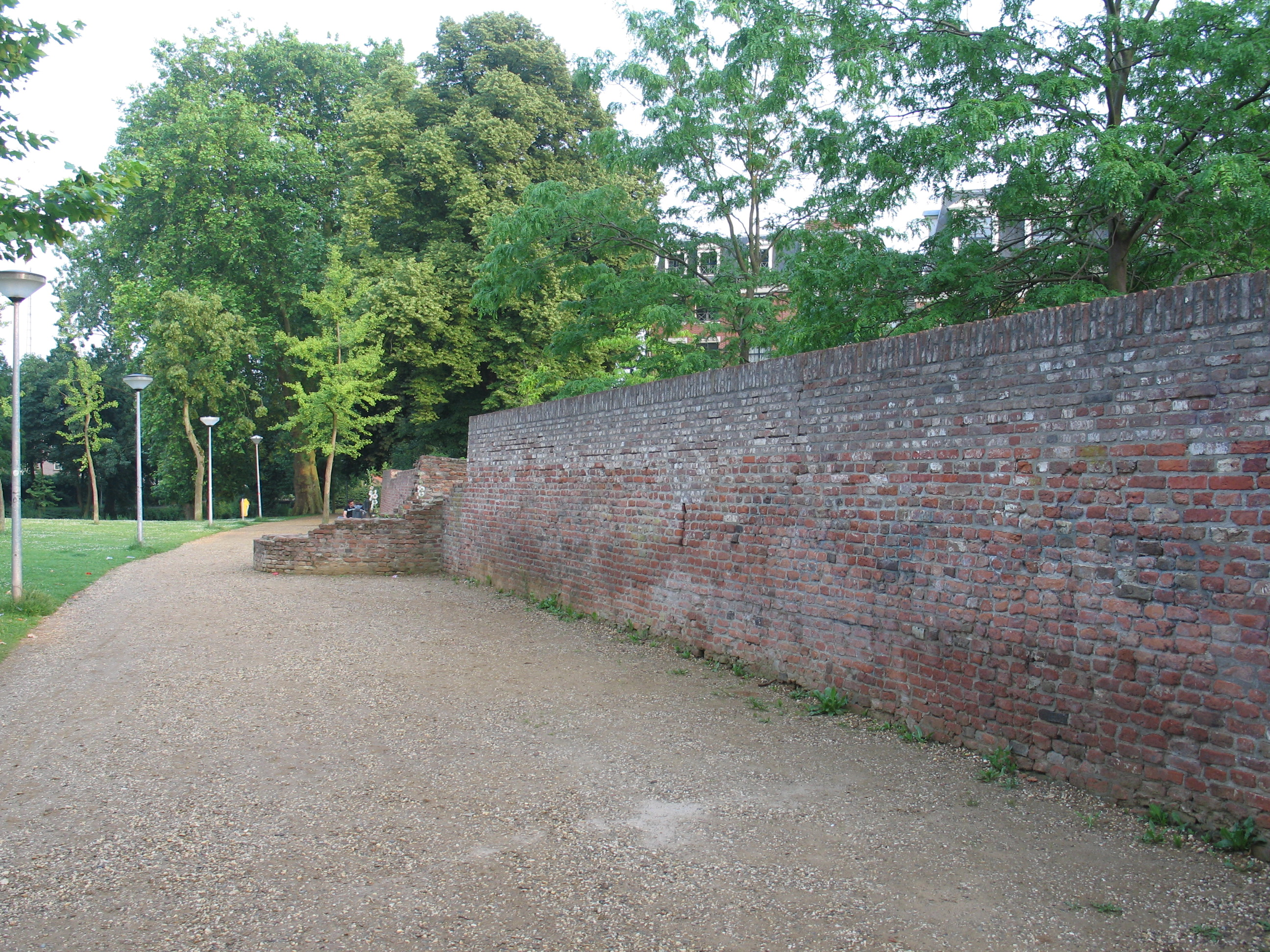
Old city ruins of the castle and city walls

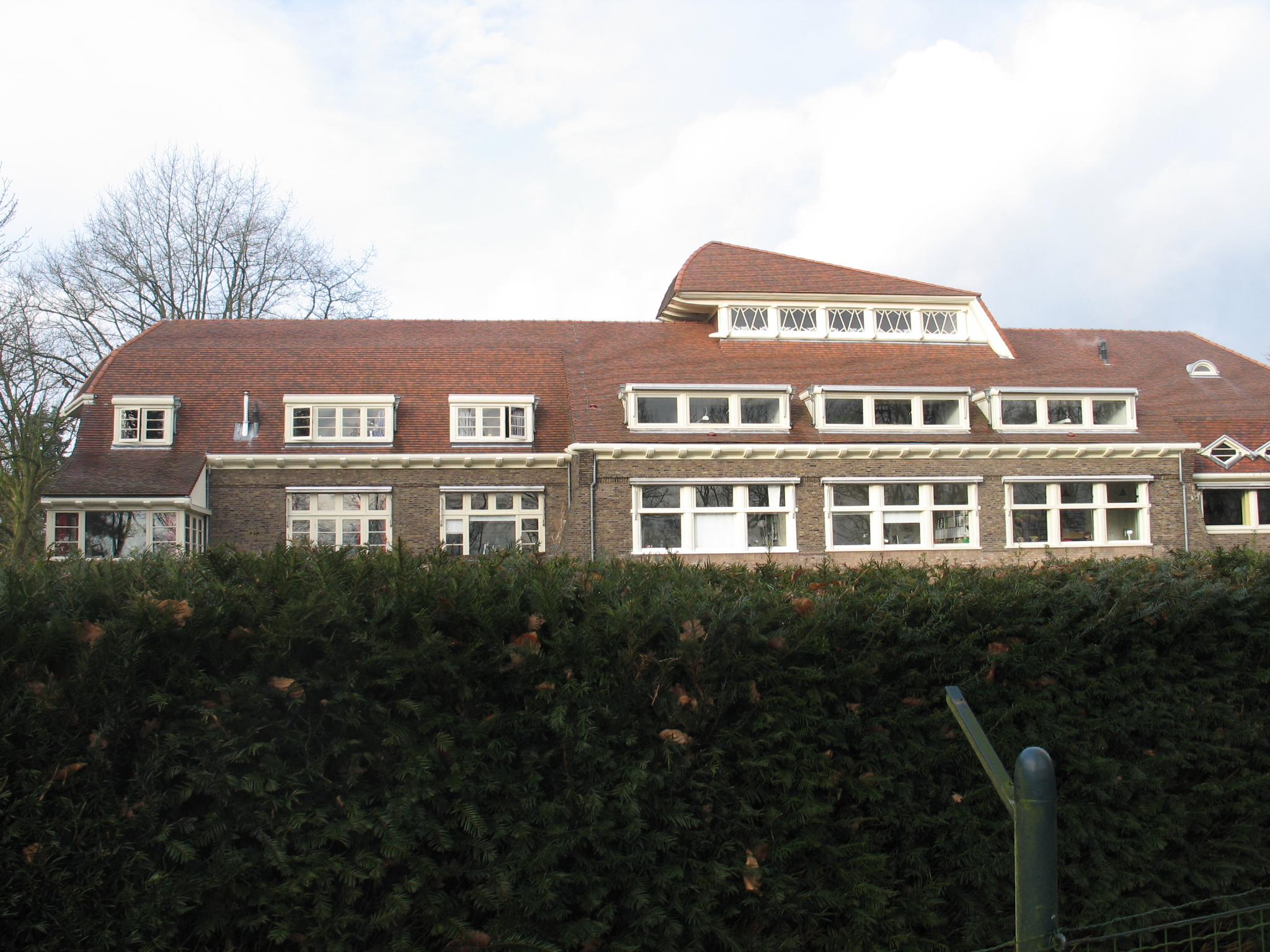
Schip van Blaauw

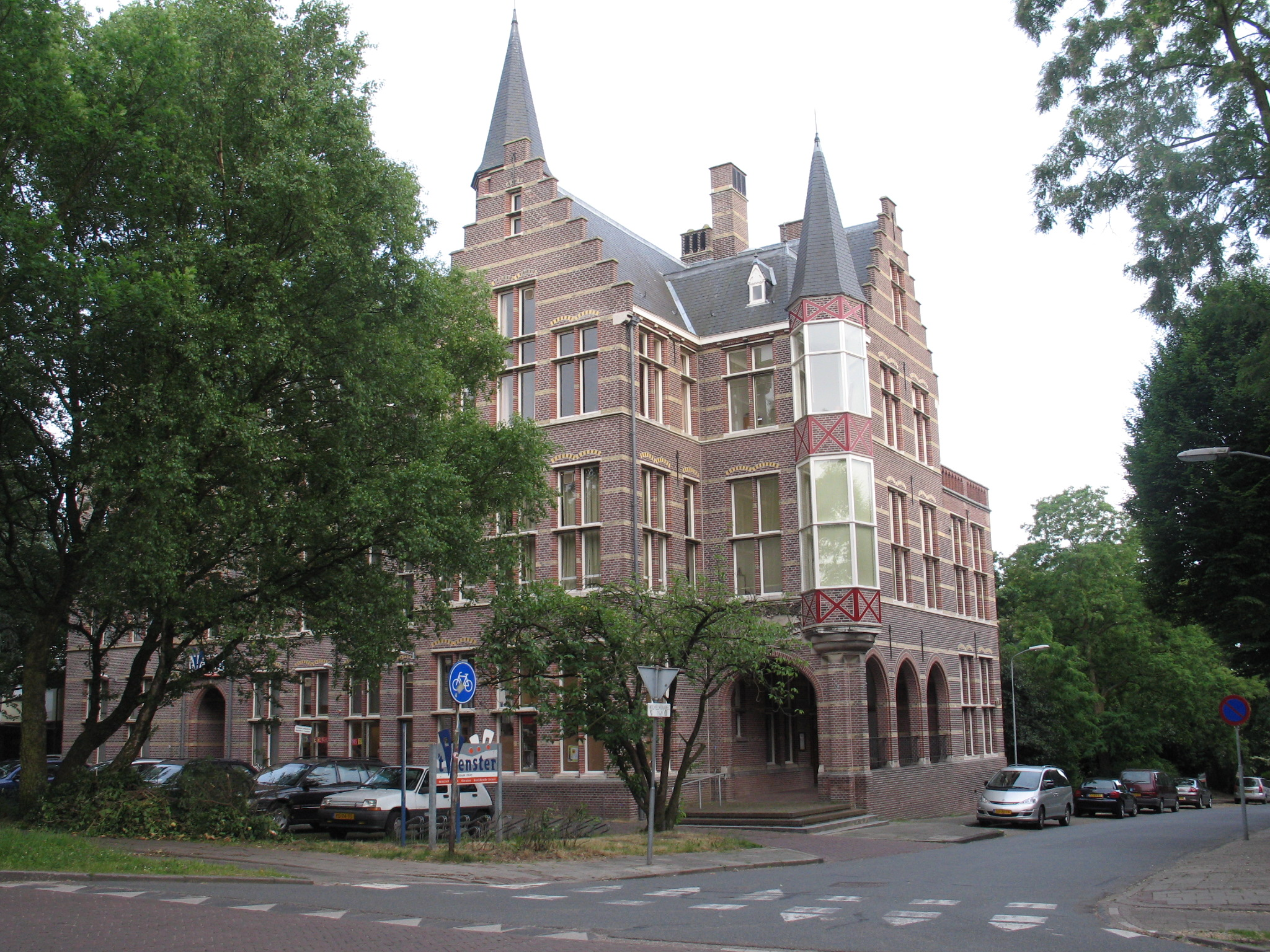
't Venster

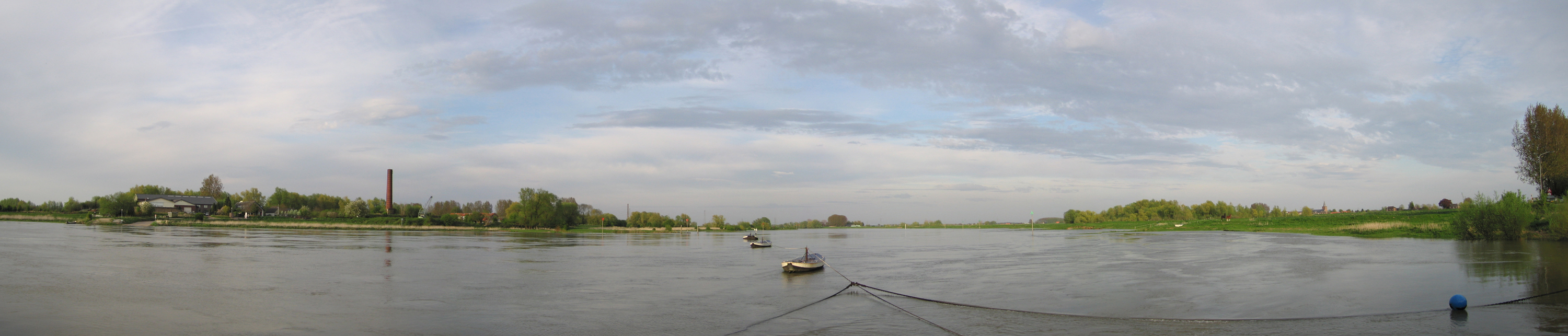
Panorama of the Rhine river in Wageningen

== See also ==
- Dijkgraaf, Gelderland
- List of national monuments in Wageningen
- List of sculptures in Wageningen
- (in Dutch) In Boek Weg van de Wederopbouw Wageningen, 'M. van den Wijngaart, Modernisme rondom een traditionele kern p. 58–85, 2016, 186p
