= Eline Flipse =

Dutch film director

Eline Flipse (born in 1954 in Wageningen, the Netherlands) is a film director of documentaries.

Flipse studied at the Film Academy in Amsterdam, where she got her degree in 1978. In 1982, she made her first documentary, Het Verschijnsel B, about bibliophily.

She directed her first documentary for Scarabee Films in 1995; Broken Silence was about five young Chinese composers. The film won many international awards, including the Grand Prix of the Visions du Réel documentary film festival in Nyon, Switzerland, the Grand Prize Ethos Bacao (Romania), and the Best Discovery Documentary, Festival Du Nouveau Cinema in Montreal. It also was nominated for best feature-length documentary at the Dutch Film Festival.

Since Broken Silence, the collaboration between Eline Flipse and Scarabee Films has led to several very successful documentaries. Biografi, for example, won the Prix d'Europa in 2001 (Berlin).

At the moment, Eline Flipse is finishing Eat Your Enemy, a documentary about aggression and spirituality. It is a film full of paradoxes and has already been selected for the International Film Festival Rotterdam 2005. Eline already has plans for her next film: Galina will be a portrait of the Russian opera diva Galina Vishnevskaya, wife of the world-famous cellist Rostropovich.
