= Johannes Blaskowitz =

German general (1883–1948)

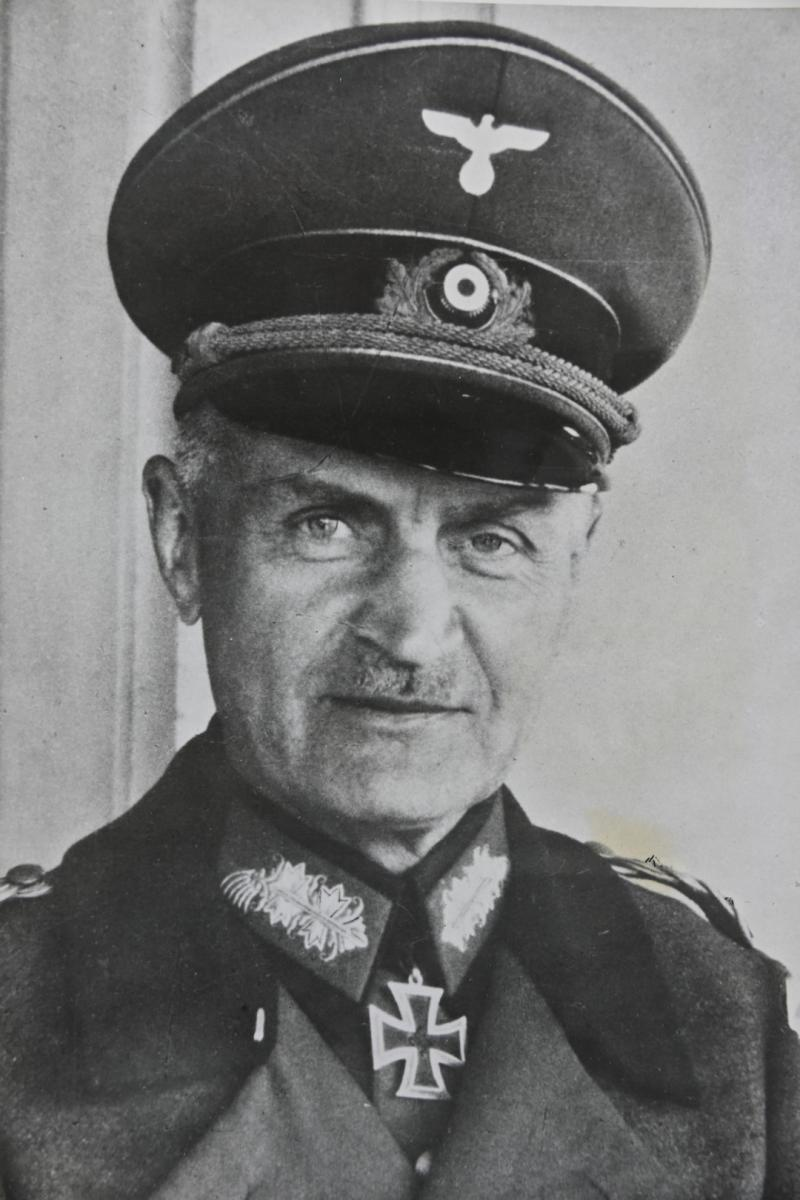
- Blaskowitz during World War II
- Born: Johannes Albrecht Blaskowitz; 10 July 1883; Paterswalde, East Prussia, German Empire
- Died: 5 February 1948 (aged 64); Nuremberg, American occupation zone in Germany
- Cause of death: Defenestration (suicide)
- Relatives: Anna Emilie Mathilde Riege (m. 1906); 2 children
- Military career
- Allegiance: German Empire; Weimar Republic; Nazi Germany
- Branch: Prussian Army; Imperial German Army; Reichswehr; German Army
- Service years: 1901–1945
- Rank: Generaloberst
- Commands: 8th Army; 9th Army; 1st Army; Army Group G; Army Group H
- Conflicts: World War I; World War II; Invasion of Poland; Battle of Wola Cyrusowa; Battle of the Bzura; Siege of Warsaw (1939); Battle of France; Case Anton; Operation Lila; Operation Dragoon; Siegfried Line campaign; Lorraine Campaign; Operation Nordwind
- Awards: Knight's Cross of the Iron Cross with Oak Leaves and Swords

Johannes Albrecht Blaskowitz (10 July 1883 – 5 February 1948) was a German Generaloberst (colonel general) during World War II. After joining the Imperial German Army in 1901, Blaskowitz served throughout World War I, where he earned the Iron Cross for bravery. During World War II, Blaskowitz led the 8th Army during the Invasion of Poland and was the Commander in Chief of occupied Poland from 1939 to 1940. He was awarded the Knight's Cross of the Iron Cross with Oak Leaves and Swords. He commanded Army Group G during the Allied invasion of Southern France and Operation Nordwind, the last major German offensive of World War II on the Western Front. Blaskowitz later commanded the remnants of Army Group H as it withdrew to Northern Netherlands before surrendering to Allied forces.

Blaskowitz wrote several memoranda to the German high command objecting to the criminal conduct of the SS and its Einsatzgruppen during and after the 1939 invasion of Poland. He court-martialed several SS members for war crimes against Jewish and Polish civilians. As a result, Adolf Hitler limited Blaskowitz's future commands and career advancement.

After the war, Blaskowitz was charged with war crimes in the High Command Trial at Nuremberg. He died by suicide during the trial on 5 February 1948.

== Early years ==
Johannes Blaskowitz was born on 10 July 1883 in the village of Paterswalde, Province of East Prussia, German Empire (now Bolshaya Polyana in the Kaliningrad Oblast, Russia). He was the son of a Protestant pastor, Hermann Adam Franz Blaskowitz (1848–1919), and his wife Marie, née Kuhn (1852–1886) who married in 1874. In 1894, Blaskowitz joined cadet school at Köslin (now Koszalin, Poland) and afterwards at Berlin Lichterfelde. In 1901, he started his military career as a Fähnrich in the Infanterie-Regiment "von Grolman" (1. Posensches) Nr. 18 in Osterode (Ostróda).

During World War I, Blaskowitz served on the Eastern and Western Fronts and was employed in the General Staff. He rose to command an infantry company by 1918, and was awarded the Iron Cross for bravery.

== Interwar period ==
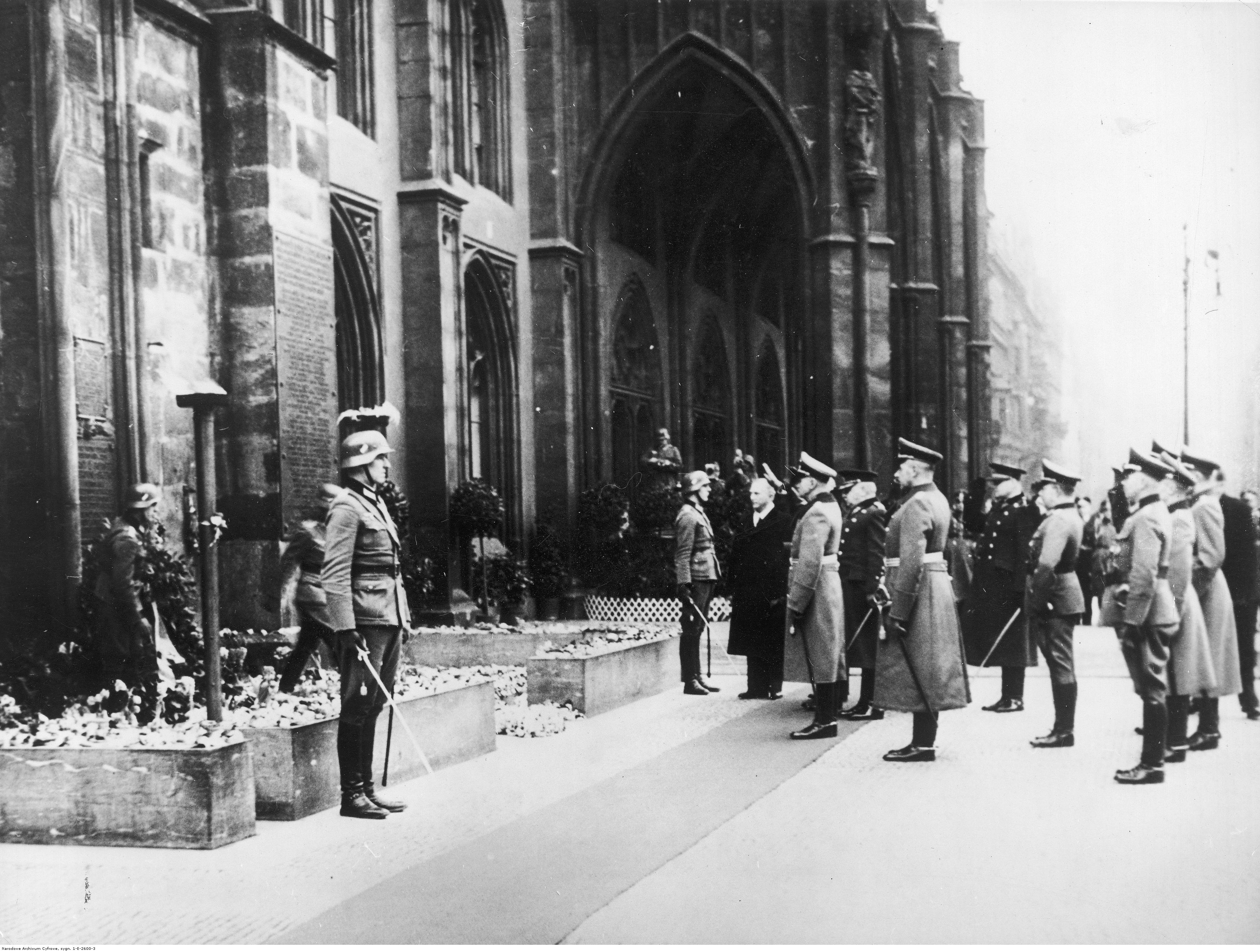
Blaskowitz visiting the Tomb of the Unknown Soldier in Prague with German and Czechoslovak officers, 27 March 1939

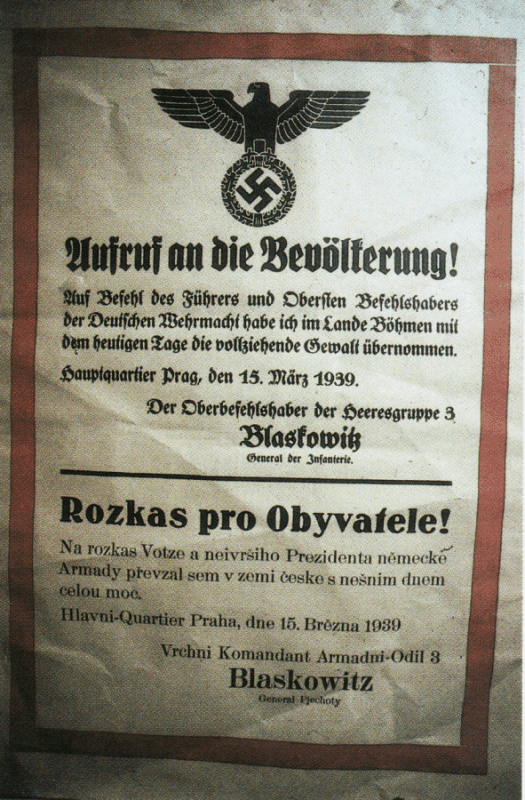
Decree written in poor Czech

Blaskowitz's war service secured him a place in the small postwar Reichswehr during the Weimar Republic, through whose ranks he rose to the rank of General. His attitude towards the Nazis' seizure of power in 1933 was reportedly indifferent because he believed that the armed forces should be "politically neutral".

In early 1939 he commanded the German forces that occupied Czechoslovakia, and was promoted to General of Infantry and given command of the 8th Army just prior to the outbreak of World War II. He was mocked because of the poor Czech language used in the first decree as the occupation commander. It was immediately replaced by the corrected version of the decree.

== Invasion of Poland ==
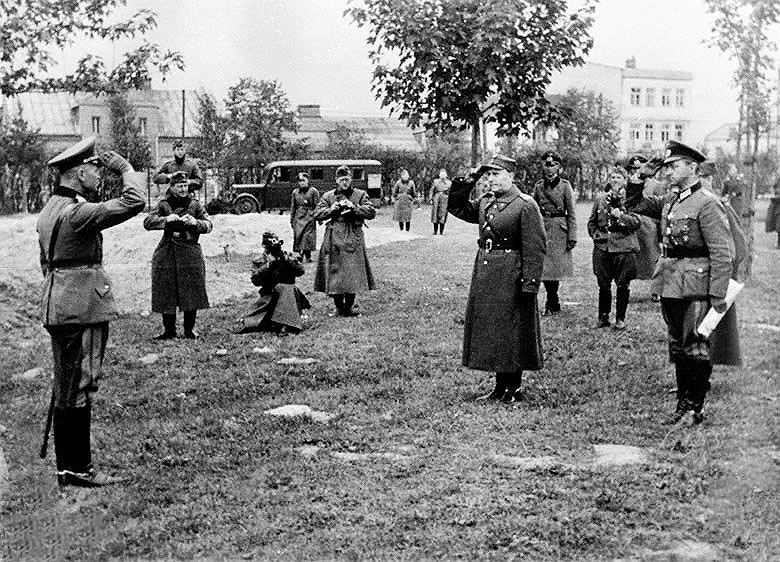
Tadeusz Kutrzeba surrenders the Polish capital of Warsaw to Blaskowitz (left), 27 September 1939

During the invasion of Poland, the 8th Army under Blaskowitz's command was responsible for the northern part of the front under Army Group South, led by Gerd von Rundstedt. The 8th Army saw heavy combat during the Battle of the Bzura and later besieged the Polish capital of Warsaw. On 28 September 1939, Blaskowitz accepted the surrender of General Tadeusz Kutrzeba and the Polish forces in Warsaw. After the campaign, he was awarded the Knight's Cross of the Iron Cross, promoted to Generaloberst and appointed as Commander-in-Chief East in Poland on 20 October 1939.

As a traditional soldier, Blaskowitz kept firm control over the men under his command in their dealings with civilians and opposed Army participation in war crimes by the SS and Einsatzgruppen. He handed down death sentences to members of the SS for crimes against the civilian population, which were later rescinded by Adolf Hitler.

Between November 1939 and February 1940, he wrote several memorandums to higher military officials detailing SS atrocities in Poland, their negative effects on Wehrmacht soldiers and the German military’s reputation, the insolent attitude of the SS toward the Army. He warned that the SS "might later turn against their own people in the same way," and noted that “The attitude of the [Wehrmacht] troops to the SS and police alternates between abhorrence and hatred." However, his protests failed to produce results, merely earning him the scorn of Hitler, Hans Frank, Reinhard Heydrich and Heinrich Himmler, while Chief of Staff Alfred Jodl dismissed them as naive and "uncalled for".

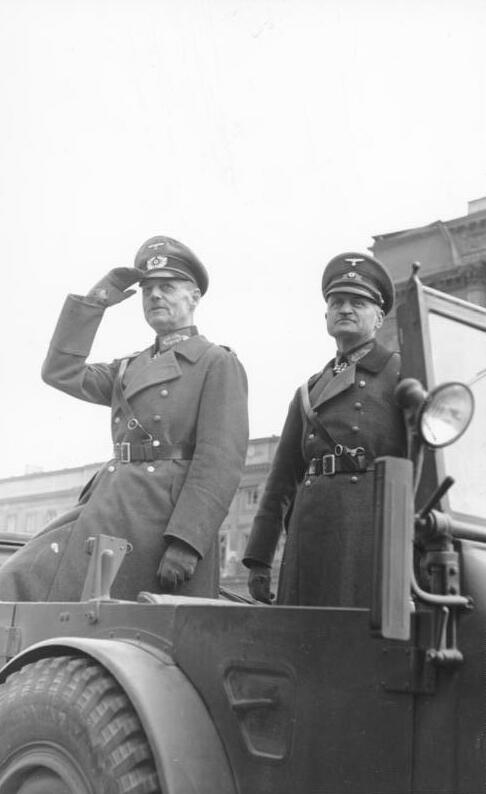
Blaskowitz (right) with Rundstedt during the victory parade in Warsaw, 1939

Commander-in-Chief Walther von Brauchitsch forwarded Blaskowitz's first memorandum to Hitler on 18 November, who launched a tirade against Blaskowitz, denouncing his concerns about due process as "childish" and poured scorn on his "Salvation Army attitude." In February 1940, Blaskowitz prepared a list of 33 complaints against the SS. Among his complaints were strip searches and rape of Jewish women, a whipping orgy in Nasielsk affecting 1,600 Jews, and a clear case of race mixing committed by a junior SS officer. Blaskowitz concluded that "It is a mistake to massacre some 10,000 Jews and Poles, as is being done at present; for—so far as the mass of the population is concerned—this will not eradicate the idea of a Polish state, nor will the Jews be exterminated." Blaskowitz was relieved of his command on 29 May 1940. Having thus encountered Hitler's wrath, Blaskowitz was the only Generaloberst at that time who was not promoted to Generalfeldmarschall in summer 1940 after the fall of France.

== Occupation of France ==
Following the Fall of France in May 1940, Blaskowitz was initially slated to command the 9th Army for occupation duties, but the appointment was blocked by Hitler and instead he was appointed to a relatively minor position as Military Governor of Northern France, a position he held until October 1940, when he was transferred to the command of the 1st Army, on the southwest coast between Brittany and the Pyrenees.

On 10 November 1942, the 1st and 7th Army under Blaskowitz's command launched Case Anton, the military occupation of Vichy France. The 1st Army advanced from the Atlantic coast, parallel to the Spanish border, while the 7th Army advanced from central France towards Vichy and Toulon. The 50,000-strong Vichy French Army took defensive positions around Toulon, but when confronted by German demands to disband, it did so since it lacked the military capability to resist. By the evening of 11 November, German tanks had reached the Mediterranean coast. Anton marked the end of the Vichy regime as a nominally independent state. However, Blaskowitz's forces failed to secure the Vichy French fleet at Toulon, which was scuttled by the French.

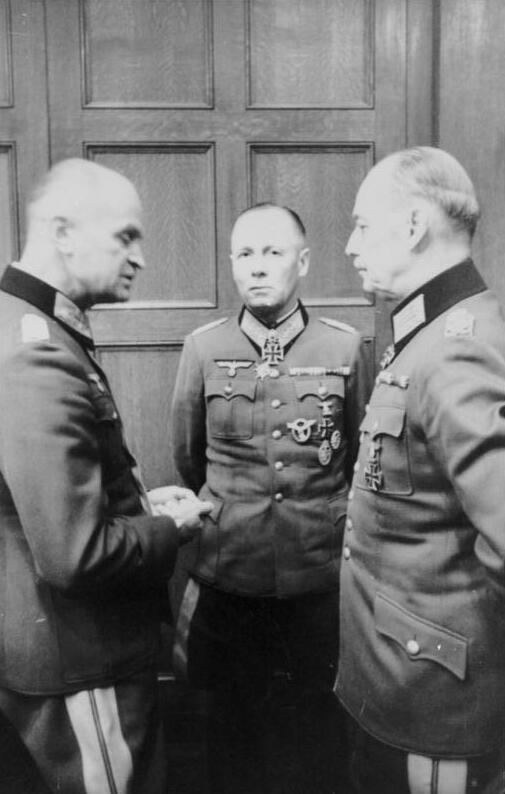
Blaskowitz (left) at a briefing in Paris with Field Marshals Rommel and von Rundstedt, May 1944

In May 1944, following the appointment of Gerd von Rundstedt as Commander-in-Chief in the West, Blaskowitz was appointed the head of Army Group G. This comparatively small command, consisting of the 1st Army and the 19th Army, was given the task of defending southern France from the imminent Allied invasion. When in Normandy, he managed to convince Field Marshal Erwin Rommel that the "rumours" Rommel had heard about atrocities on the Eastern Front were actually true.

According to historian Christopher Clark, in France, Blaskowitz tried to "build a constructive relationship with the local population", even though the conditions for him to do so were worse than in Poland. He encouraged the troops deployed to support French agriculture to act "selflessly". On the one hand, he tried to ensure that German counterinsurgency would be conducted in accordance with international norms as far as possible. He publicly distanced himself from units that committed the Oradour-sur-Glane massacre. On the other hand, when the prefects in Toulouse complained about crimes against civilians in "counter-terrorism" procedures conducted by the SS, Blaskowitz defended the right of the German army to defend itself, even though he admitted sometimes innocent people were harmed. He recommended that the French authorities be told that "it is imperative that innocent people sometimes fall victim to the bullet [...]. Against such a struggle [namely on the part of the partisans of the Resistance], the Wehrmacht must and will defend itself under all the means of power at its disposal." After the July Bomb Plot, he sent a note that proclaimed loyalty to Hitler. Clark speculates that he might have feared that he was suspected. There was no evidence that suggests Blaskowitz ever protested the deportation of Jews from France. Although army appraisal forms, compiled by Rundstedt, described him as a National Socialist, Christopher Clark opines that Blaskowitz likely never had any ideological attachment to Nazism. According to Clark, professionalism enabled Blaskowitz to follow his own principles even against the political Zeitgeist, but the same professionalism made him unsuitable for political resistance. After a visit in October 1943, German resistance member Ulrich von Hassell lamented that it was not fruitful to discuss with Blaskowitz who saw everything from a military point-of-view. From this "very bounded standpoint", whatever one thought about the regime's moral character became overshadowed by duty to his superiors and his troops, as well as the people whose fate "now hung in balance."

== Campaign in the West 1944–45 ==
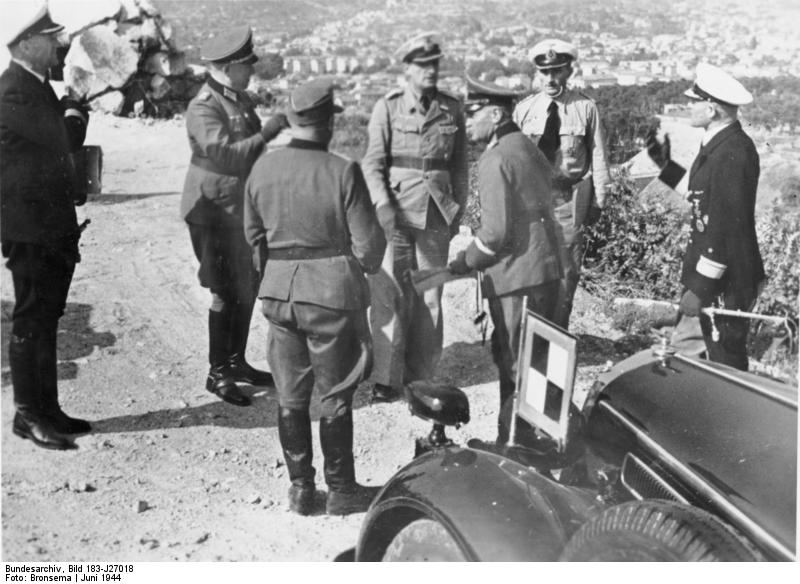
Blaskowitz as commander of Army Group G, inspecting German defenses in France, June 1944

The invasion of southern France (Operation Dragoon) commenced on 15 August 1944, when Allied forces landed on the Riviera between Toulon and Cannes. Blaskowitz's forces had been weakened by the relocation of its divisions to other fronts and the replacement of its soldiers with third-rate Ostlegionen outfitted with obsolete equipment. Although badly outnumbered and lacking air defence, Blaskowitz brought up troops, stabilized the front, and led a fighting withdrawal to the north to avoid encirclement. U.S. Army units pursued Blaskowitz's forces up through the Vosges mountains before pausing to regroup and refuel in early September. There, Blaskowitz's troops were reinforced by the 5th Panzer Army under Hasso von Manteuffel. Blaskowitz was in overall command of German forces defending Nancy. Nancy was encircled and fell on 15 September 1944, but most of the German forces escaped encirclement.

By September 1944, Army Group G was pushed back to the Alsace region, near the German border. Blaskowitz wanted to entrench his forces, but Hitler ordered him to immediately counterattack Patton's U.S. Third Army. Both Manteuffel and Blaskowitz realized the futility of such an action, but obeyed orders. Their attack near Arracourt caught U.S. forces in disarray and pushed them back to near Lunéville on 18–20 September, at which point resistance stiffened and the attack was suspended. As a result, Hitler summarily relieved Blaskowitz, replacing him with Hermann Balck. The halt of the Third Army in September allowed Blaskowitz's forces to strengthen the fortress of Metz. Patton's forces first reached the fortress at Metz on 5 September 1944, forcing a German surrender on 21 November 1944. The battle of Metz took over 10 weeks, with both sides suffering heavy casualties. An attempt by Third Army to seize Fort Driant just south of Metz was also defeated. Blaskowitz reviewed Patton's decision to launch a headlong attack straight into the fortifications of Metz by saying: "A direct attack on Metz was unnecessary. The Metz fortress area could have been masked. In contrast a swerve northward in the direction of Luxemburg and Bitburg would have met with greater success and caused our 1st Army's right flank collapse followed by the breakdown of our 7th Army."

Balck was unable to stop the Third Army's advance and was relieved of command of Army Group G. Since 22 December, Blaskowitz had his previous command again and ordered to attack in Alsace-Lorraine in support of the ongoing Ardennes offensive. The goals of the offensive were to destroy the Seventh United States Army and French First Army and to seize Strasbourg. On 1 January 1945, in Operation Nordwind, Army Group G attacked the Seventh Army, forcing them to withdraw. However, the Wehrmacht troops were halted near Haguenau in late January and failed to achieve their main objectives.

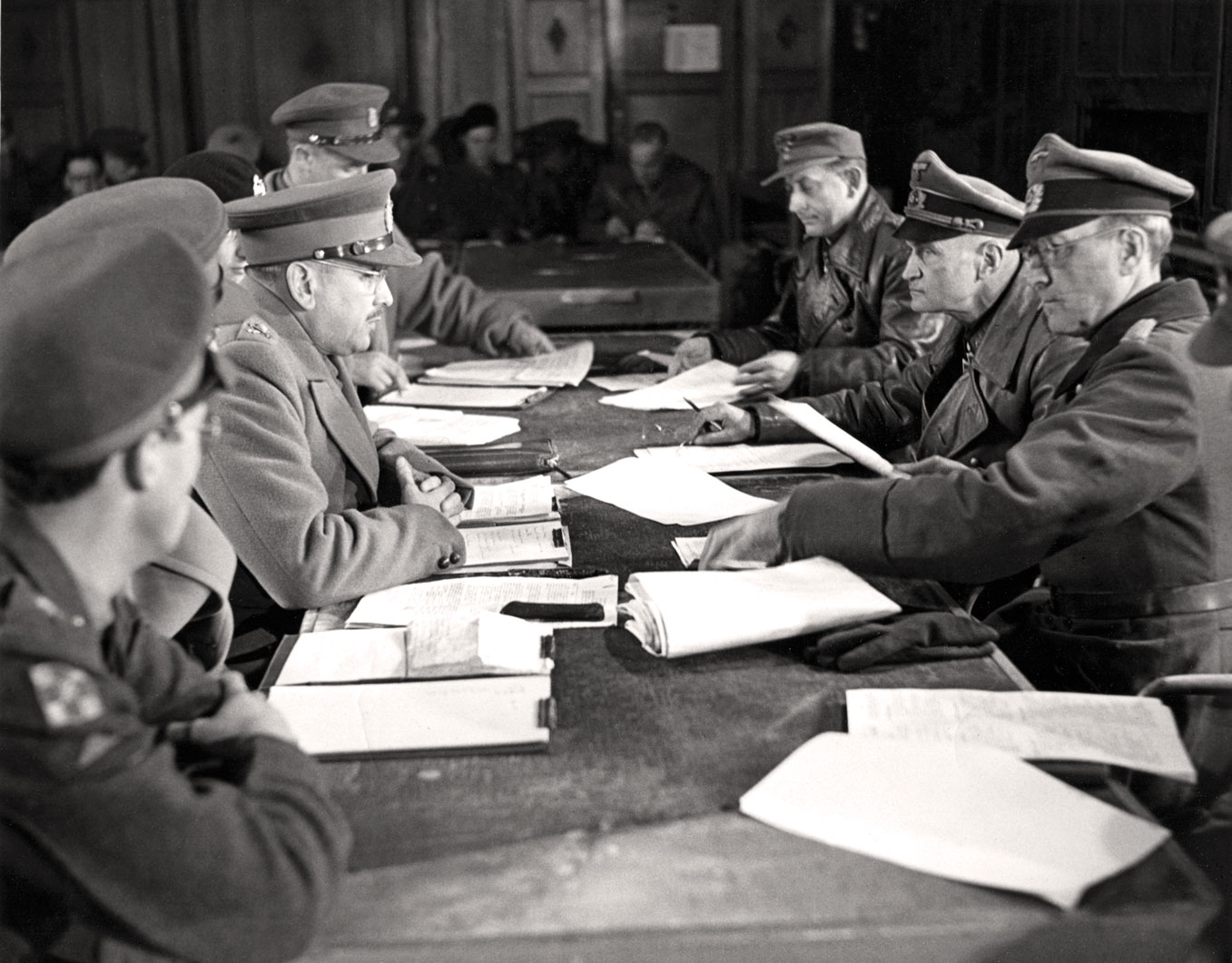
Blaskowitz (second from right) surrenders German forces in the Netherlands to Canadian officers

Blaskowitz was subsequently transferred to the Netherlands on 30 January, where he succeeded Kurt Student as commander of Army Group H. For the following three months he conducted a fighting withdrawal against the British 2nd Army, and was awarded the Swords to his Knight's Cross. This command was redesignated in early April 1945 and Blaskowitz became commander-in-chief of the northern (still occupied) part of the Netherlands. During the Dutch famine of 1944–45, Blaskowitz allowed air corridors for Allied airdrops of food and medicine to the Dutch civilian population.

On 5 May Blaskowitz was summoned to the Hotel de Wereld in Wageningen by Lieutenant-General Charles Foulkes, (commander of I Canadian Corps), to discuss the surrender of the German forces in the Netherlands. Prince Bernhard, acting as commander-in-chief of the Dutch Interior Forces, attended the meeting. Blaskowitz agreed with all proposals by Foulkes. However, nowhere in the building – some sources say nowhere in the whole town – could a typewriter be found. Thus, the surrender document could not be typed. The next day, both parties returned and, in the presence of both Foulkes and Prince Bernhard, Blaskowitz signed the surrender document, which in the meantime had been typed.

== Indictment and trial ==
Blaskowitz was tried for war crimes at the High Command Trial (Case No. 12), one of the subsequent Nuremberg trials. In one notorious case he was accused of ordering the execution of two deserters after the German surrender. He died by suicide on 5 February 1948. After breaking away from his guards, he jumped off a balcony into the inner courtyard of the court building. During the Nuremberg trials, Blaskowitz and Werner von Blomberg, Minister of War during the years leading to World War II, signed affidavits declaring that:

The whole group of German staff and front officers believed that the question of the Polish Corridor would have to be settled some day, if necessary by force of arms.
A war to wipe out the political and economic losses resulting from the creation of the Polish Corridor was regarded as a sacred duty though a sad necessity.
Before 1938-39, the German generals were not opposed to Hitler.
Hitler produced the results which all of us warmly desired.

According to Hans Laternser, the defence counsel for the lead defendant, Wilhelm von Leeb, the prosecution told him, "Blaskowitz did not need to do that as he would certainly have been acquitted". That led to Laternser questioning the indictment. According to Clark, Blaskowitz could have counted on an acquittal. Historian Jen Scholten states in Norbert Frei's book on the elites of Nazi Germany, that the Nuremberg judges expressly saw Blaskowitz as a positive example of how Wehrmacht officers could have behaved.

== Promotions ==
- 2 March 1901 Fähnrich ('Officer Cadet')
- 27 January 1902 Leutnant ('2nd Lieutenant') with Patent from 10 July 1900
- 27 January 1910 Oberleutnant ('1st Lieutenant')
- 17 February 1914 Hauptmann ('Captain')
- 23 December 1921 Major with effect from 1 January 1922
  - 20 March 1922 received Rank Seniority (RDA) from 1 June 1921 (10)
- 6 April 1926 Oberstleutnant ('Lieutenant Colonel') with effect and RDA from 1 April 1926 (3)
- 1 October 1929 Oberst ('Colonel') with RDA from 1 October 1929 (15)
- 1 October 1932 Generalmajor ('Major General') with RDA from 1 October 1932 (6)
- 1 December 1933 Generalleutnant ('Lieutenant General') with RDA from 1 December 1933 (1)
- 2 August 1936 General der Infanterie ('General of the Infantry') with effect and RDA from 1 August 1936 (2)
  - 10 November 1938 received new RDA from 1 December 1935
- 30 September 1939 Generaloberst with effect and RDA from 1 October 1939 (1)

== Awards and decorations ==
- Iron Cross (1914), 2nd and 1st Class
  - 2nd Class on 27 September 1914
  - 1st Class on 2 March 1915
- Baden Order of the Zähringer Lion, Knight's Cross 2nd Class with Swords (BZ3bX) in the spring of 1915
- Military Merit Cross (Austria-Hungary), 3rd Class with the War Decoration on 10 February 1916
- Military Merit Order (Bavaria), 4th Class with Swords (BMV4X/BM4X) on 15 May 1916
- Friedrich August Cross, 2nd and 1st Class (OK1) on 26 May 1916
- War Merit Cross (Brunswick), 2nd Class (BrK2) on 4 June 1916
- Ottoman War Medal (TH) on 11 July 1917
- Royal House Order of Hohenzollern, Knight's Cross with Swords (HOH3X) on 1 September 1917
- Wound Badge (1918) in Black (1918)
- Honour Cross of the World War 1914/1918 with Swords on 10 November 1934
- Wehrmacht Long Service Award, 4th to 1st Class on 2 October 1936
- Hungarian World War Commemorative Medal with Swords on 11 December 1936
- Austrian War Commemorative Medal with Swords on 12 January 1937
- Bulgarian War Commemorative Medal 1915–1918 with Swords on 19 January 1938
- Anschluss Medal (1938)
- Sudetenland Medal with the Prague Castle Bar (1939)
- Repetition Clasp 1939 to the Iron Cross 1914, 2nd and 1st Class
  - 2nd Class on 16 September 1939
  - 1st Class on 21 September 1939
- Mentioned by name in the Wehrmachtbericht on 27 September 1939
- Order of the Crown of Italy, Grand Cross on 27 August 1940
- German Cross in Silver on 30 October 1943 as Generaloberst and Commander-in-Chief of the 1. Armee
- Knight's Cross of the Iron Cross with Oak Leaves and Swords
  - Knight's Cross on 30 September 1939 and General der Infanterie and Commander-in-Chief of the 8. Armee
  - 640th Oak Leaves on 29 October 1944 as Generaloberst and Commander-in-Chief of the Heeresgruppe G
  - 146th Swords on 25 April 1945 as Generaloberst and Commander-in-Chief of the Netherlands

Government offices
Preceded by none	Supreme commander of German armies in the Protectorate; 15 March 1939–18 March 1939	Succeeded by Konstantin von Neurath
Military offices
Preceded by none	Commander of 8. Armee; 1 September 1939–20 October 1939	Succeeded by General der Infanterie Otto Wöhler
Preceded by none	Commander of 9. Armee; 15 May 1940–29 May 1940	Succeeded by General der Infanterie Adolf Strauß
Preceded by General Erwin von Witzleben	Commander of 1. Armee; 24 October 1940–2 May 1944	Succeeded by General Joachim Lemelsen
Preceded by none	Commander of Heeresgruppe G 8 May 1944–20 September 1944	Succeeded by General Hermann Balck
Preceded by General Hermann Balck	Commander of Heeresgruppe G 24 December 1944–29 January 1945	Succeeded by General Paul Hausser
Preceded by Generaloberst Kurt Student	Commander of Heeresgruppe H 30 January 1945–15 April 1945	Succeeded by Generalfeldmarschall Ernst Busch
