= Ernst Busch =

Ernst Busch may refer to:

- Ernst Busch (field marshal) (1885–1945), German field marshal
- Ernst Busch (actor) (1900–1980), German singer and actor
