= Army Group H =

- German: Heeresgruppe H
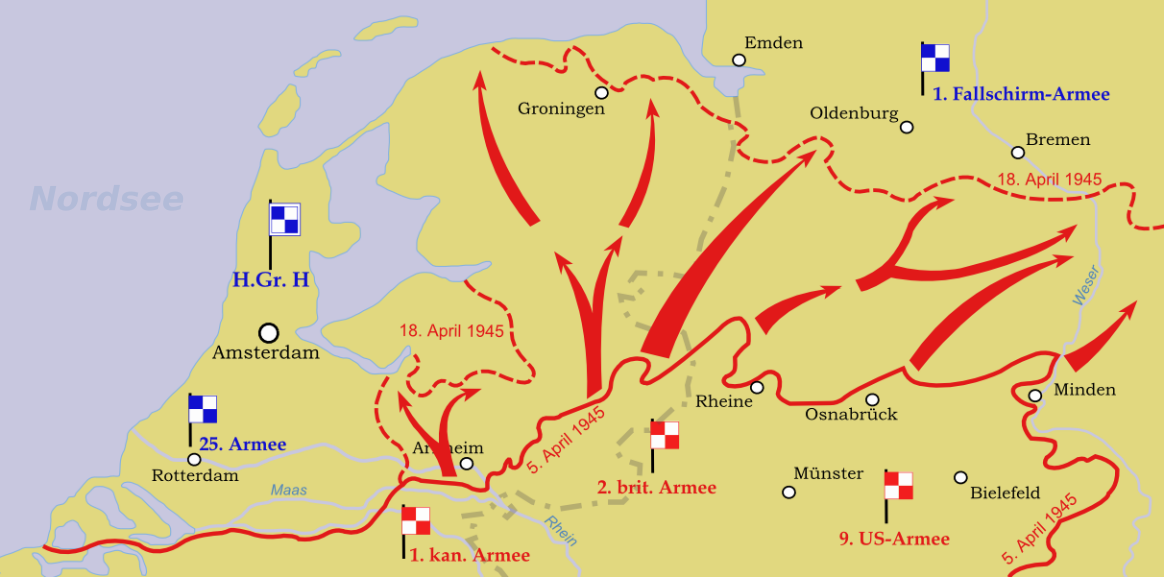
- Allied advance in the Netherlands and in Northwestern Germany in April 1945. Army Group H is labelled H.Gr. H.
- Active: 11 November 1944 – 4 May 1945
- Country: Nazi Germany
- Branch: German Army (Wehrmacht)
- Type: Army Group
- Engagements: World War II (Western Front)

Commanders
- Notable commanders: Kurt Student; Johannes Blaskowitz; Ernst Busch

Army Group H (German: Heeresgruppe H) was a German army group during World War II, active between November 1944 and May 1945. It was deployed mainly in the German-occupied Netherlands. The staff was known as Supreme Commander North West (German: Oberbefehlshaber Nordwest) from 7 April. The army group surrendered at Lüneburg Heath on 4 May 1945.

H was the highest letter given to a German army group during World War II.

== History ==
In mid-to-late 1944, the Western Allies had undertaken the ambitious Operation Market Garden, a multi-layered airborne assault against several targets in the Low Countries with the aim to quickly cross the major geographic barrier of the area, the Rhine river. Although the German counterattack against Market Garden broadly succeeded and inflicted heavy Allied casualties (especially at Arnhem), German operational planners feared repeated Allied attempts to break through the German defenses in the northern sector of the Western Front.

Army Group H was formed on 11 November 1944 in the German-occupied Netherlands, using personnel from the former Army Detachment Kleffel as well as parts of the former Army Detachment Serbia. Kurt Student was assigned for command of the army group, then being prepared for formation, on 27 October 1944. The staff for the army group was assembled on 10 November. After 7 April 1945, the command staff of Army Group H was also designated "Supreme Commander North West".

Army Group H was mainly to hold the German defenses along the Rhine river, though it also had to shield several key targets on the west bank of the river, such as the Düsseldorf–Duisburg bridgehead (which stretched from Dinslaken via Krefeld to Düsseldorf), with which the Germans intended to shield the vital Rhine-Ruhr industrial region. Secondary defensive lines inside this bridgehead were installed at Duisburg-Homburg, Krefeld-Uerdingen, and Düsseldorf.

As of December 1944, Army Group H contained the 1st Parachute Army and the 15th Army. On 1 December 1944, Army Group H counted 484,656 soldiers. In the broader German strategy of the Western Front, Army Group H was subordinate to Supreme Command West (also known, from its previous designation, as "Army Group D"), along with Army Group B and Army Group G. Army Group H stood opposite the northern flank of the Western Allied forces, which was mainly covered by the Allied 21st Army Group (with the 1st Canadian Army and 2nd British Army).

Planning for the German Ardennes Offensive ("Battle of the Bulge", December 1944 – January 1945) initially gave Army Group H an active role, but the 15th Army was then repurposed to merely serve to cover the flank of the advancing 6th SS Panzer Army. Army Group H was then intended to join the offensive with a southwards thrust once the operational breakthrough to Antwerp had been secured. As this breakthrough did not materialize, Army Group H did not join the Ardennes Offensive with its own forces. Initially, Army Group H had been intended to receive the I SS Panzer Corps (with 1st SS Panzer Division and 12th SS Panzer Division) in late January 1945 to possibly commence counterattacks against the advancing Western Allies, but the I SS Panzer Corps was rerouted on short notice to join the Austrian front, where the Red Army was making rapid gains.

Johannes Blaskowitz replaced Student as commander of Army Group H on 30 January 1945. Between January and March 1945, the army group contained the 1st Parachute and the 25th Army. On 1 February 1945, the army group was supplied with the 172nd Reserve Division for coastal defense in Frisia. On 10 February 1945, VI Flak Corps was formed to oversee 16th Flak Division, 9th Flak Brigade and 18th Flak Brigade in the sector of Army Group H.

On 1 March 1945, the army group had an overall strength of seven infantry divisions, four airborne divisions, one panzer division, one Panzergrenadier division and the 106th Panzer Brigade. With the deep advances by the Western Allies into the German heartland between March and April (such as the capture of Eisenach and Würzburg on 7 April), western Germany was effectively split into several areas of defense, of which the remaining forces of Army Group H in the "Fortress Holland", especially 25th Army, were the strongest.

Ernst Busch replaced Blaskowitz as commander of Army Group H on 15 April 1945.

== Noteworthy individuals ==
- Kurt Student, commander of Army Group H from 7 November 1944 until 30 January 1945.
- Johannes Blaskowitz, commander of Army Group H from 30 January until 15 April 1945 (also "Supreme Commander North West" from 7 April 1945 until 15 April 1945).
- Ernst Busch, commander of Army Group H (and "Supreme Commander North West") from 15 April 1945 until capitulation.
