= Ernst Busch (field marshal) =

German field marshal (1885–1945)

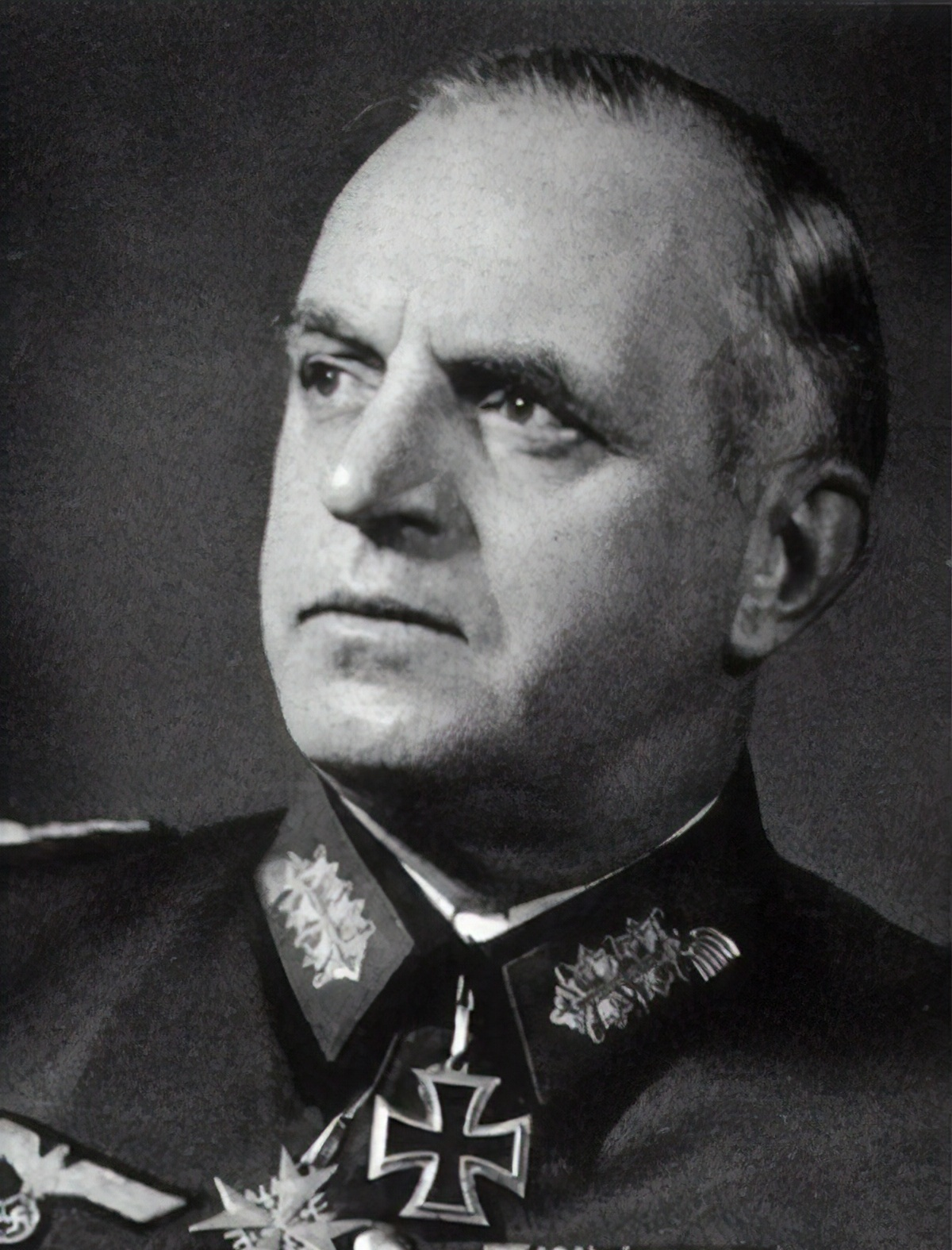
- Busch, c. 1940–1943
- Born: Ernst Bernhard Wilhelm Busch; 6 July 1885; Essen, Prussia, Germany
- Died: 17 July 1945 (aged 60); Camp Aldershot, United Kingdom
- Burial place: Cannock Chase German war cemetery
- Military career
- Allegiance: Germany
- Branch: German Army
- Service years: 1904–1945
- Rank: Generalfeldmarschall
- Commands: VIII Army Corps; 16th Army; Army Group Centre
- Conflicts: World War I; World War II; Invasion of Poland; Battle of France; Operation Barbarossa; Operation Bagration
- Awards: Pour le Mérite; Knight's Cross of the Iron Cross with Oak Leaves

Ernst Bernhard Wilhelm Busch (6 July 1885 – 17 July 1945) was a German Generalfeldmarschall (field marshal) during World War II who commanded the 16th Army (as a Generaloberst) and Army Group Centre.

During World War I, Busch served as an infantry officer and was retained in the postwar army of the Weimar Republic. He steadily rose in seniority and by 1936 was a general and commander of the 23rd Infantry Division. During the invasion of Poland, he commanded VIII Army Corps. In 1940, he was appointed commander of the 16th Army; he led it during the 1940 Battle of France and Operation Barbarossa, the 1941 invasion of the Soviet Union.

By October 1943, Busch was the commander of Army Group Centre but he was dismissed in June 1944 after the collapse of his command during the Red Army's Operation Bagration. He was later the commander of Army Group Northwest in the final months of the war and died as a prisoner of war in England.

== Early life ==
Busch was born on 6 July 1885 at Essen in the Ruhr district of Germany. In 1904, having graduated from the Gross Lichterfelde Cadet Academy, he joined the Imperial Army as a Fahnenjunker (officer cadet). He was initially posted to the Westphalian 13th Infantry Regiment but was later assigned to the 57th Infantry Regiment, in which he was commissioned a Leutnant (second lieutenant). In 1913, he was promoted to Oberleutnant (first lieutenant) and received further training at the War Academy.

== World War I ==
During World War I, Busch served mostly on the Western Front, initially as a company commander. Within months of the beginning of the war, he had been awarded both the first and second classes of the Iron Cross. In 1915, he was promoted to Hauptmann (captain) and then appointed a battalion commander in the 56th Infantry Regiment. He fought in several battles across the Artois, Flanders, and Champagne sectors of the front. He was awarded the Knight's Cross of the Royal House Order of Hohenzollern with Swords in 1917 and the following year received the Pour le Mérite.

== Interwar period ==
After the war, Busch was retained in the postwar Reichsheer. He mostly served in a series of staff positions for the next several years, including a period as Inspector of Transport Troops and as a battalion commander in the 9th Infantry Regiment. An ardent supporter of Adolf Hitler, he received a series of rapid promotions from 1933. He soon held the rank of Oberst (colonel) and was commander of 9th Infantry Regiment, which was based at Potsdam, and in 1935 was promoted to Generalmajor (Note: In the Wehrmacht, the rank of Generalmajor was equivalent to a brigadier general in the United States Army.) and given command of the 23rd Infantry Division. (Note: By this time, the Reichsheer had become the Heer (Army) branch of the Wehrmacht (Defence Force).) During the tensions of 1938 between Hitler and the two senior officers in the Wehrmacht, Generalfeldmarschall (Note: At the time, the highest rank in German armed forces) Werner von Blomberg and Generaloberst (Note: Equivalent to a general in the United States Army.) Werner von Fritsch, Busch sided with Hitler. At this stage of his career, Busch was a General der Infanterie (General of Infantry) (Note: Equivalent to a lieutenant general in the United States Army.) and was commander of Wehrkreis VIII.

== World War II ==
=== Invasion of Poland and France ===
On the outbreak of World War II in September 1939, Busch was commander of the VIII Army Corps which participated in the invasion of Poland as part of the 14th Army. It captured the city of Kraków, reached the Vistula River and advanced as far as Lviv. During the campaign in Poland, he was twice awarded the Clasp to the Iron Cross.

The following year Busch led the 16th Army, which consisted of 13 infantry divisions, during the Battle of France and covered the left flank of General der Panzertruppe Heinz Guderian's XIX Panzer Corps. During the later stages of the fighting in France, he was awarded the Knight's Cross of the Iron Cross and this was followed by a promotion to Generaloberst on 19 July 1940. Once the campaign in France was completed, Busch's 16th Army remained in the country until early 1941, when it was transferred to Poland.

=== Invasion of the Soviet Union ===
When Operation Barbarossa, the invasion of the Soviet Union, commenced in late June 1941, the 16th Army controlled seven infantry divisions. Assigned to Army Group North, and operating on its southern flank during the advance into the Baltic States and Russia, it captured Staraya Russa in August. By December, the 16th Army had been considerably expanded, and Busch now had nine infantry divisions along with two motorised divisions, with one more in reserve, under his command. When the Red Army began its winter offensive in January 1942, several parts of his army became encircled and Staraya Russa was nearly lost. Busch had to resort to his reserve to ensure his forces could hold onto the city. The commander of Army Group North, Generaloberst Georg von Küchler, became dissatisfied with Busch's performance and wanted to relieve him of command. Permission to do so was denied. The Red Army offensive shifted focus towards Army Group Centre which relieved the pressure on the 16th Army. Busch was able to relieve his encircled troops although it took several months and required his army to be reinforced.

For the remainder of 1942 and into 1943 the 16th Army's sector was relatively quiet, with the Red Army directing its offensive operations against the 18th Army, which was besieging Leningrad. On 1 February 1943, Busch was promoted to Generalfeldmarschall but this owed more to Hitler's patronage than to his leadership of the 16th Army. Six months later, he received the Oak Leaves to the Knight's Cross he had been awarded during the campaign in France.

On 28 October 1943, Generalfeldmarshall Gunther von Kluge, the commander of Army Group Centre, was injured in a vehicle accident and Busch was named as his replacement. Army Group Centre controlled 76 divisions across four field armies. Fifty-four of these divisions were infantry, which included six from Hungary, and there were also five Panzer divisions. However, few divisions were at full strength and over the coming months Busch amalgamated several of them. Others were low quality, particularly the Hungarian divisions and also the eight Luftwaffe Field Divisions that were also part of two of his armies. By June 1944, his command numbered 38 infantry divisions.

Busch had to contend with several attacks when the Red Army commenced its winter operations in late 1943. He showed little independence in exercising his command and often deferred to Hitler's orders without protest. When fighting around Vitebsk threatened to cut off one of the divisions of Generaloberst Georg-Hans Reinhardt's 3rd Panzer Army, he had to seek Hitler's permission to allow it to withdraw. Hitler declined and the division was only saved when Reinhardt, on his own initiative, ordered it to retreat. In May 1944, Busch also conceded to Hitler's instructions to transfer his LVI Panzer Corps to Army Group North Ukraine despite this leaving his own command with minimal tanks.

An increased build-up of Soviet forces opposite Army Group Centre was largely ignored by Busch. Despite some of his subordinates' efforts to reduce their frontage, he refused to let them do so and blindly reiterated Hitler's orders that there be no retreat. In particular, the towns of Vitebsk, Orsha, Mogilev, and Bobruisk were to be held in force. Busch had attempted to query this with Hitler but was rebuffed and ridiculed. This only strengthened Busch's resolve to follow Hitler's directives without question. By mid-June, the 700,000 troops of Army Group Centre were outnumbered by 2,500,000 Soviet soldiers. When the Soviet summer offensive of 1944, Operation Bagration, began on 22 June, Army Group Centre's 34 divisions were overwhelmed by nearly 120 Red Army divisions. His army commanders immediately sought permission to withdraw to the Dnieper River but this was denied by Busch, who insisted their positions be held. Within two days, most of his divisions were effectively destroyed. Having overseen the loss of 250,000–300,000 men (25 full divisions), the biggest defeat for Germany on the Eastern Front, Busch was relieved of his command by Hitler on 28 June. He was replaced by Field Marshal Walter Model who managed to stop the advance of the Red Army, but not until it reached the Vistula. In the meantime, Busch became depressed after his sacking which effectively came about because of his adherence to Hitler's orders.

=== Army Group Northwest ===
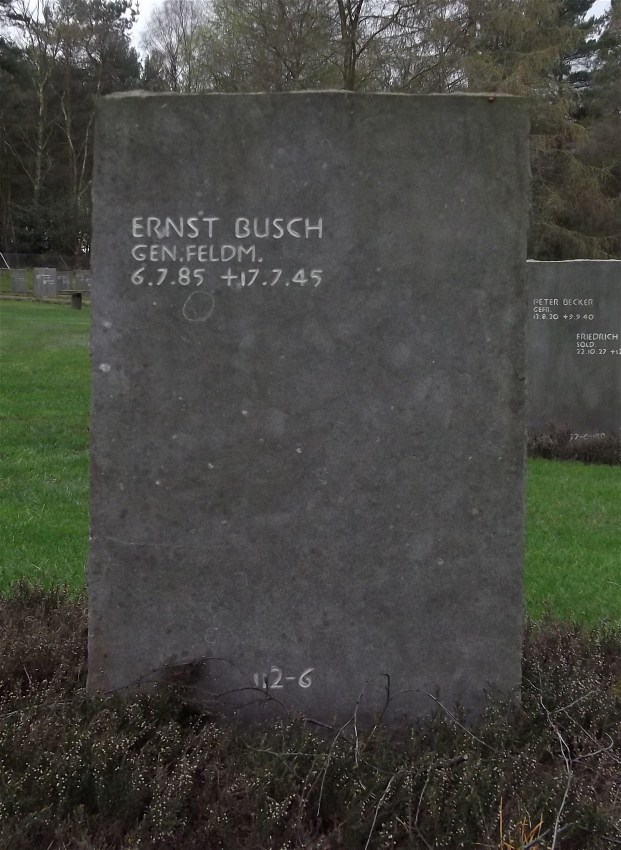
Busch's grave

Having gradually returned to favour with Hitler, Busch was recalled to duty on 20 March 1945 when he became head of Army Group Northwest. Tasked with defending the portion of German coastline along the North Sea, he had few resources and lacked the respect of many men under his command. Busch surrendered to Field Marshal Bernard Montgomery on 4 May 1945.

Busch died in a prisoner of war camp in Aldershot, England, on 17 July 1945 and was buried at Aldershot Military Cemetery. His remains were later re-interred at Cannock Chase German Military Cemetery.

== Bibliography ==
- Mitcham, Samuel W. Jr. (1988). Hitler's Field Marshals and Their Battles. London, United Kingdom: Guild Publishing. OCLC 220632577.
- Scherzer, Veit (2007). Die Ritterkreuzträger 1939–1945 Die Inhaber des Ritterkreuzes des Eisernen Kreuzes 1939 von Heer, Luftwaffe, Kriegsmarine, Waffen-SS, Volkssturm sowie mit Deutschland verbündeter Streitkräfte nach den Unterlagen des Bundesarchives [The Knight's Cross Bearers 1939–1945 The Holders of the Knight's Cross of the Iron Cross 1939 by Army, Air Force, Navy, Waffen-SS, Volkssturm and Allied Forces with Germany According to the Documents of the Federal Archives] (in German). Jena, Germany: Scherzers Militaer-Verlag. ISBN 978-3-938845-17-2.
- Thomas, Franz; Wegmann, Günter (1993). Die Ritterkreuzträger der Deutschen Wehrmacht 1939–1945 Teil III: Infanterie Band 3: Br–Bu [The Knight's Cross Bearers of the German Wehrmacht 1939–1945 Part III: Infantry Volume 3: Br–Bu] (in German). Osnabrück, Germany: Biblio-Verlag. ISBN 978-3-7648-1734-3.

Military offices
| Preceded by none | Commander of 23rd Infantry Division; October 1935 – February 1938 | Succeeded by General der Infanterie Walter von Brockdorff-Ahlefeldt |
| Preceded by General der Kavallerie Paul Ludwig Ewald von Kleist | Commander of VIII. Armeekorps; 3 February 1938 – 25 October 1939 | Succeeded by Generaloberst Walter Heitz |
| Preceded by none | Commander of 16th Army; 22 October 1939 – 11 October 1943 | Succeeded by General der Artillerie Christian Hansen |
| Preceded by Generalfeldmarschall Günther von Kluge | Commander of Army Group Centre; 29 October 1943 – 28 June 1944 | Succeeded by Generalfeldmarschall Walter Model |
| Preceded by Generaloberst Johannes Blaskowitz | Commander of Army Group Northwest; 20 March 1945 – 4 May 1945 | Succeeded by None, command surrendered |
