= List of Jews deported from Wageningen (1942–43) =

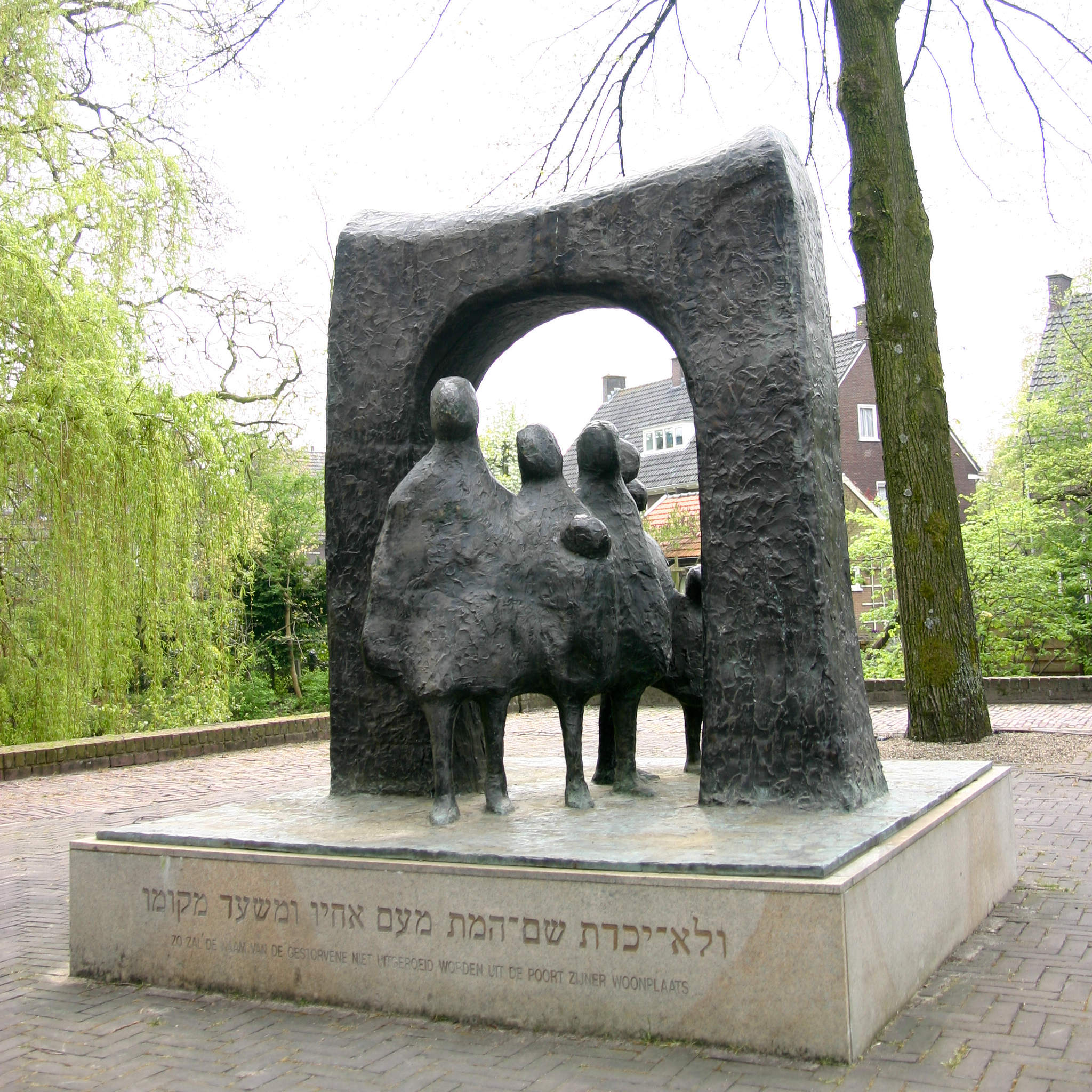
"Levenspoort" (Arch of Life), bronze memorial sculpture by Yetty Elzas. In remembrance of the 71 Jewish citizens of Wageningen and surroundings, deported and murdered during the years, 1940-1945. Located on Walstraat, "approximately opposite from where Wageningen's synagogue" was until May 1940. Inscription on the base, in Hebrew and Dutch, is from Ruth (4:10): "...so the name of the deceased might not disappear from among his relatives and from his village."

This article lists Jews deported by the Nazis from Wageningen (Gelderland) and neighboring municipalities in the Netherlands during World War II.

== Municipality of Wageningen ==
=== Residents of Wageningen ===
- Alexander, Juliana-Beatrix (b. January 1, 1939, Rotterdam; d. September 17, 1943 (age 4), Auschwitz)
- Alexander, Karl Israel (b. June 12, 1887, Rogasen; d. July 25, 1943 (age 56), Westerbork)
- Berger, Geza (b. August 2, 1892, Budapest, Hungary; d. September 30, 1942 (age 50), Auschwitz)
- Cassiver, Ilse (wife of K.I. Alexander), (b. August 26, 1908, Breslau; d. September 17, 1943 (age 35), Auschwitz)
- Cohen, Sophia-Hendrika (b. April 7, 1903, Wageningen; d. February 6, 1944 (age 40), Auschwitz)
- Gelder, Bernhard van, student at the Wageningen University and Research (Landbouwhogeschool Nederland) (b. February 23, 1916, The Hague; d. September 24, 1943 (age 27), Auschwitz)
- Gernsheim, Helena (widow of J. Weidenreich), (b. October 15, 1867, Worms, Germany; d. April 23, 1943 (age 76), Sobibor)
- Meijer, Lodewijk (b. July 8, 1919, Amsterdam; d. September 24, 1943 (age 24), Auschwitz)
- Meijer, Ottilie Sara (widow of B. Beijer), (b. December 15, 1874, Maagdenburg, Germany; d. April 16, 1943 (age 69), Sobibor)
- Ostermann, Laura Wilhelmina Sara (wife of R.I. Loewenthal), (b. March 13, 1874, Berlin; d. May 21, 1943 (age 69), Sobibor)
- Pinkhof, Juda, student at the Landbouwhogeschool Nederland (b. July 11, 1921, Amsterdam; d. November 3, 1942 (age 21), Auschwitz)
- Rippe, Jacques (b. March 16, 1878, Brielle; d. July 2, 1943 (age 65), Sobibor)
- Sanders, Henrij (b. December 26, 1861, Gouda; d. November 5, 1942 (age 80), Auschwitz)
- Waal, Rachel van de (wife of J. Rippe), (b. October 9, 1879; d. July 2, 1943 (age 63), Sobibor)

== Municipality of Ede ==
=== Residents of Bennekom ===
- Frankenthal, Gunther (b. September 18, 1929, Leipzig, Germany; d. February 28, 1945 (age 15), Auschwitz)
- Frankenthal, Ludwig-Israel (b. November 27, 1885, Schwanfeld, Germany; d. October 14, 1944 (age 68), Auschwitz)
- Frankenthal, Wolfgang (b. June 10, 1931, Leipzig; d. October 14, 1944 (age 13), Auschwitz)
- Kropveld, Elsiene Helena (wife of Alexander Woude), (b. August 3, 1909, Amsterdam; d. March 6, 1944 (age 34), Auschwitz)
- Kutnewsky, Editha-Charlotte (widow of J. Blode), (b. March 4, 1889, Berlin; unknown)
- Roos, Betje, (b. February 28, 1878, Rotterdam; d. April 16, 1943 (age 65), Sobibor)
- Sprecher, Hermann, student at the Landbouwhogeschool Nederland (b. May 13, 1919, Rotterdam; d. October 10, 1942 (age 23), Auschwitz)
- Woude, Alexander (Alex, Lex) van der (b. April 25, 1900, Amsterdam; d. March 6, 1944 (age 43), Auschwitz)
- Woude, Henriette Frederika (Jetje) van der (b. February 14, 1935, Wageningen; d. March 6, 1944 (age 9), Auschwitz)
- Woude, Louis Hein (Loekie) van der (b. July 2, 1932, Wageningen; d. March 6, 1944 (age 11), Auschwitz)

== Municipality of Renkum ==
=== Residents of Renkum ===
- Hartogson, Fanny (wife of Emanuel Manasse), (b. May 14, 1885, Embden, Germany; d. April 9, 1943 (age 57), Sobibor)
- Manasse, Emanuel Alexander (b. November 21, 1882, Renkum; d. April 9, 1943 (age 60), Sobibor)

== Municipality of Rhenen ==
=== Residents of Rhenen ===
- Frank, Sally-Heinz (b. March 17, 1920, Dorrmoschel, Germany; d. December 25, 1943 (age 23), Auschwitz)
- Klaueren-Haas, Magdelena van (b. August 1, 1870, Almelo; d. April 23, 1943 (age 72), Sobibor)

== See also ==
- History of Wageningen
- History of the Jews in the Netherlands
- History of the Netherlands (1939-1945)
- List of Jews deported from the Netherlands (in Dutch)
