= History of Wageningen =

History of town in Gelderland, Netherlands

Wageningen coat of arms

Wageningen city flag

The area around the town of Wageningen was settled as early as the 9th century. Located on the north bank of the Nederrijn river, between the Gelderse valley and the Veluwe, a wooded, hilly, glacial moraine, by the 12th century it was part of the Duchy of Guelders, in the Holy Roman Empire. Wageningen received its city charter from Count Otto II on June 12, 1263. Today, it is in the province of Gelderland, in east-central Netherlands.

== Early settlements ==
One of the earliest Bronze Age finds in the Netherlands was the Wageningen horde, found in the grave of a Bronze Age metalworker.

Roof tiles have been found near Wageningen with the stamp of the Roman legions. However, there is no evidence of a permanent Roman encampment on the north side of the Rhine river. The Roman settlement of Vada is now thought to have been near the village of Kessel, in North Brabant province, not Wageningen.

The oldest known settlement near Wageningen prior to the establishment of the city is below the bluffs and near the Nederrijn on the eastern edge of the city; near what today is known as Diedenweg (meaning Volksweg; road of the people). At the beginning of the Middle Ages the settlement moved to higher ground, what today is known as Wageningse Berg (Wageningen hill). Remains of a fieldstone chapel and wooden farmhouses have been found in that area.

Between about 350 and 900, a burial site was in use around what today is the corner of Diedenweg and Geertjesweg streets. Presumably the burials came from around Wageningen and Binnenveld.

The hamlet, Dolder, lay in the vicinity of what today is the intersection of Van Uvenweg, Churchillweg and Dolderstraat. Thulere was mentioned in 838, as was Brakel (Bracola), today near the intersection of Julianastraat and Van Uvenweg.

== Port and fortified city ==
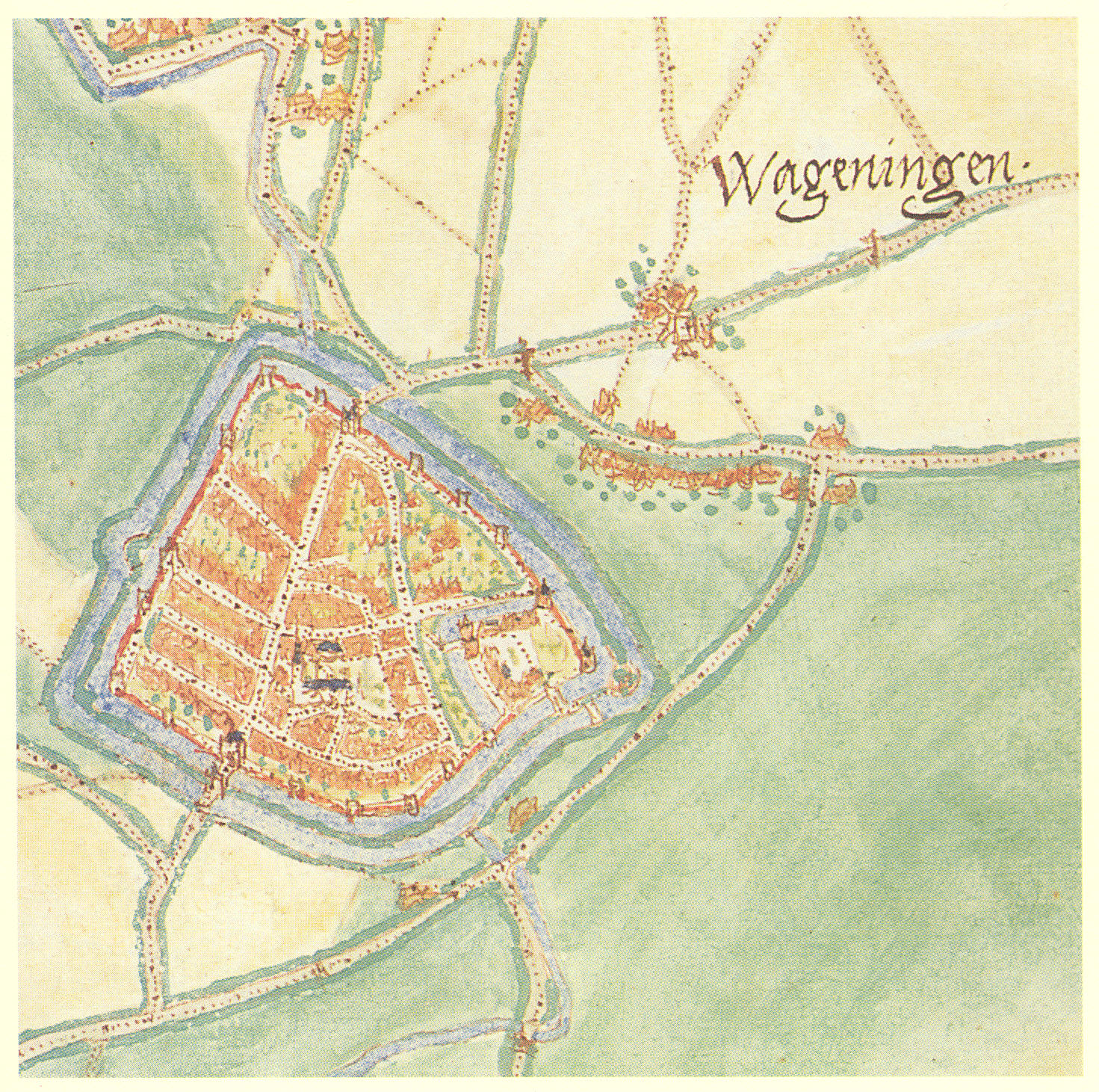
Wageningen in 1575, by Jacob van Deventer

In the 12th century a new settlement came down from Wageningse Berg. A quay was constructed at the west edge of town, with an elevated road, the current Hoogstraat (High Street), connecting it to the base of the hill to the east. At that time, the city's first church also may have been built. To the north of the High Street, a regular pattern of streets was established. On 12 June 1263, Wageningen was granted city rights by Count Otto II of the Duchy of Guelders.

For the counts and dukes of Guelders, in addition to being a trading port, Wageningen was important as a stronghold against the Bishopric of Utrecht and later the Duchy of Burgundy. In 1526–27, Charles von Egmond, the last Duke of Guelders, gave permission for the building of a fortified castle in Wageningen. Some parts of the walled city were park-like, including the former Northpark (Noorderplantsoen) area.

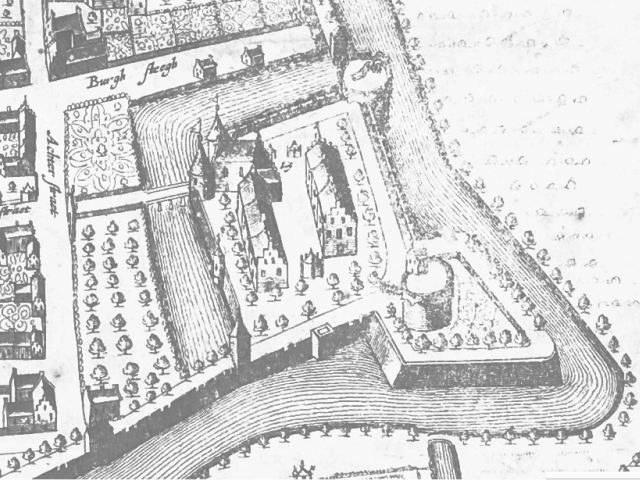
Castle of Wageningen (1654)

The Wageningen castle was sold in 1702 by the state of Gelderland to Anna Maria Ripperda, widow of Drost (Sheriff) Assueer Torck, and mother of the last sheriff, Lubbert Adolph Torck. The Torck family demolished part of the castle and rebuilt the other part into a small city palace with a Baroque garden. In 1722 Lubbert Torck Adolph married the wealthy widow Petronella van Hoorn, daughter of a governor-general of the Dutch East Indies. The previous year, he had inherited Castle Rosendael in Rozendaal, near Arnhem, from his uncle Johan van Arnhem. Torck was politically active as one of the mayors of Wageningen and in The Hague. He invested in the city, building mansions which he leased to pensioners of the Dutch East India Company (VOC) and other wealthy people. One such complex, the Bassecour, existing of four houses, was acquired by the city in 1876, to attract the National Agricultural College (rijkslandsbouwschool).

Wageningen had several known mills. By the Middle Ages, there were two mills on the former Molenweg, now called General Foulkesweg. The last of these mills, named de Eendracht, was demolished around 1996. Once surrounded by farmlands, the 19th century flour mill, de Vlijt continues to operate on Harnjesweg.

== Nearby farms ==
The various neighboring settlements were organized under the same principle structure: farms around an agricultural commons, having on the east side the arable land (at the Wageningen Eng, which was much bigger) and on the west side the meadows of the Binnenveld, evenly parcellated. The Binnenveld was farmed from the 13th century.

Important farms were de Stenen Kamer in Dolder (built 1597, demolished 1954), and de Tarthorst (1731) on Tarthorsterweg, now Haverlanden (demolished in 1969).

Two nearby settlements, de Peppeld (near the present restaurant 't Gesprek) and Leeuwen, remain recognizable. The characteristic livestock drinking pool (kolk) is still present on both properties.

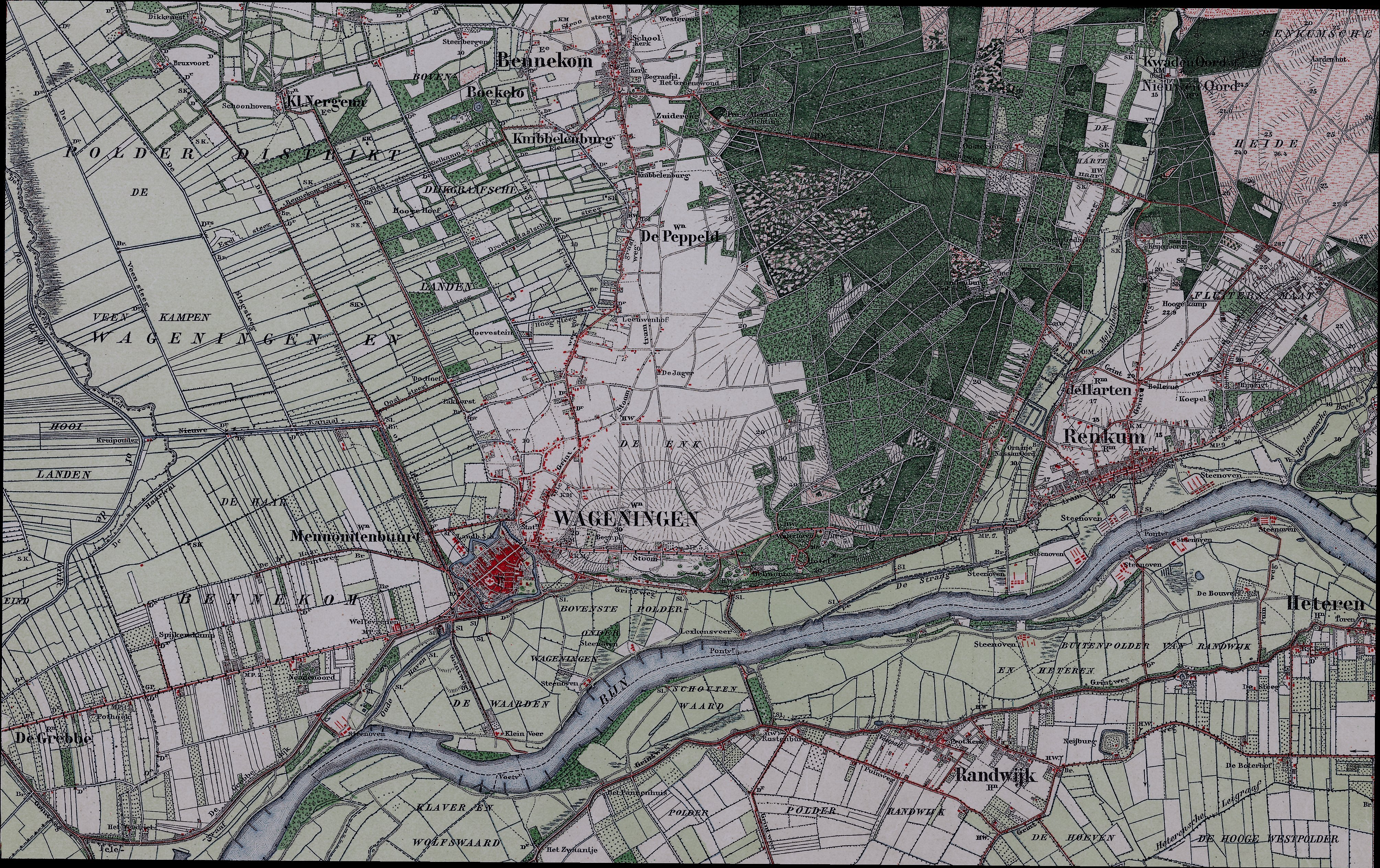
Wageningen region, 1906

== Educational institutions ==
The Landbouwhogeschool Nederland (Wageningen Agricultural College), successor to the National Agricultural and Horticultural College, was established in 1918. This was the beginning of the special development in a small, fortified city of a specialized university that has evolved today into the present the Wageningen University and Research Centre (WUR).

The Maritime Research Institute Netherlands (MARIN) was founded in 1932 as the Dutch Ship Model Basin (NSMB). MARIN is a world-renowned institute in the field of maritime and hydrodynamic research. MARIN, today part of WUR, has the status of a major technological institute in the Netherlands.

== World War II ==
Wageningen is famous for its role at the end of World War II, but it was also greatly affected during the war itself, starting in the first days of the German invasion of the Netherlands.

Wageningen was first evacuated on May 10, 1940, as part of the Dutch plan of defence against German occupation. Shortly afterwards, the central part of Wageningen was destroyed by artillery fire. Later the same month, under German occupation, residents returned and began to clear the debris and rebuild the town center. On November 22, 1940, all Jewish staff of the Landbouwhogeschool were suspended from employment; a little over three months later, on March 1, 1941, they were forced to resign.

As of October 1, 1941, Wageningen had about 15,000 residents, including about 34 Dutch Jews and about 200 Jewish refugees. By 1942, most Jews, residents and refugees alike, had been deported to meet their fate at the Sobibor and Auschwitz death camps. On May 20, 1944, the German SS carried out a wave of arrests in Wageningen of local citizens involved in the Dutch Resistance. Among those arrested were sisters, Eltien and Neeltje Krijthe, accused of hiding an illegal radio transmitter. Eltien died at Ravensbrück in 1945.

On 17 September 1944 - the first day of Operation Market Garden - Wageningen was bombed by the allies, killing 40 people. As a result, residents began to evacuate the city for the second time during the war. On 1 October, the Germans ordered to completely evacuate the city.

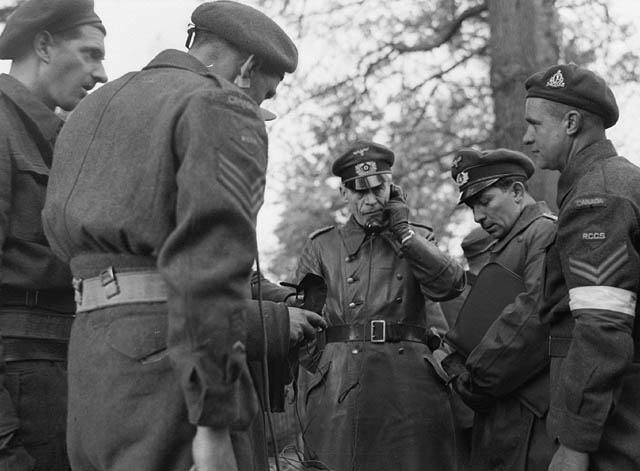
Major K. Henninger, a German Army Signals officer, negotiating with Canadian forces

Under heavy military pressure, on April 7, 1945, retreating German forces blew up the town's church towers. Ten days later, on April 17, 1945, Wageningen was liberated from the Nazis by Allied forces.

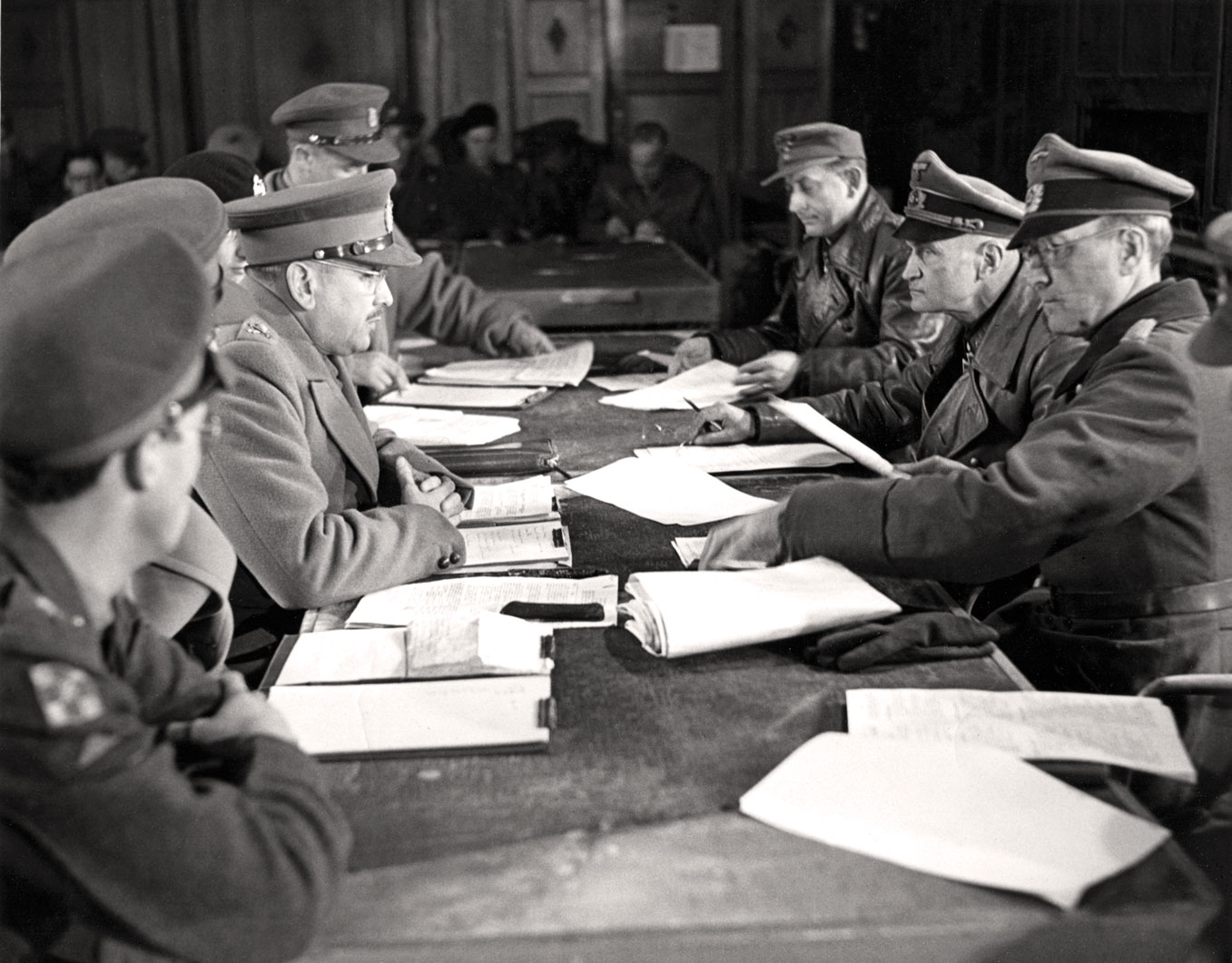
Nazi German Generaloberst Johannes Blaskowitz (center right) surrenders the Netherlands to Canadian Lieutenant-General Charles Foulkes (center left) at Hotel de Wereld on 5 May 1945

On May 4, 1945, after almost five years of German occupation, at a farm in the Nude district, on the west side of Wageningen, I Canadian Corps commander Lieutenant-General Charles Foulkes negotiated with Oberbefehlshaber Niederlande supreme commander Generaloberst Johannes Blaskowitz regarding the way the German soldiers were obliged to act after the Nazi capitulation. On May 5, the two commanders finalized the capitulation agreement at the Hotel de Wereld, near the center of the city (now celebrated every May 5 as Netherlands' Liberation Day national holiday). The capitulation document was signed the next day (no typewriter had been available the prior day) in the auditorium of Rijks Landbouw Hoogeschool, located next door to Hotel de Wereld. The agreement, known as the Dutch Capitulation Act, can be regarded as an elaboration of the total capitulation of the German armed forces for northwest Europe, which also took place on May 4. The document now resides in the Wageningen town hall.

On May 15, 1945, residents were allowed to return to Wageningen.

Until 2005, the capitulation was commemorated annually with a grand parade of former American, British and Canadian soldiers who had participated in the liberation of the Netherlands. The Liberation Parade, a richly hued parade of veterans and war material from World War II and other conflicts, began in 2006. The Liberation Parade includes space for charities and elementary school students, as well.

== Historical sites ==
In Wageningen, 60 objects are protected as national monuments, most in the town center. An additional 400 objects are protected as local monuments, as well.

== Historical gallery ==
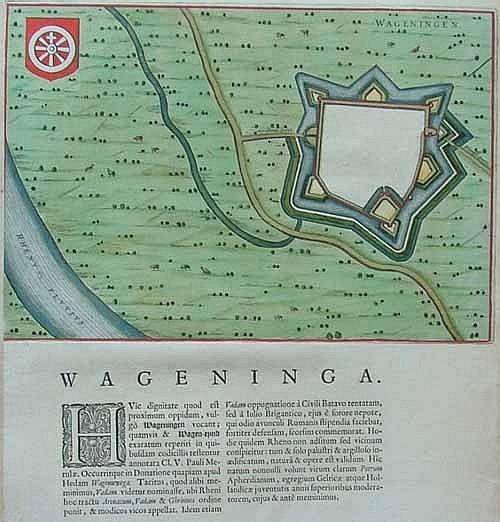
Wageningen 1649, by Joan Blaeu, 1596–1673

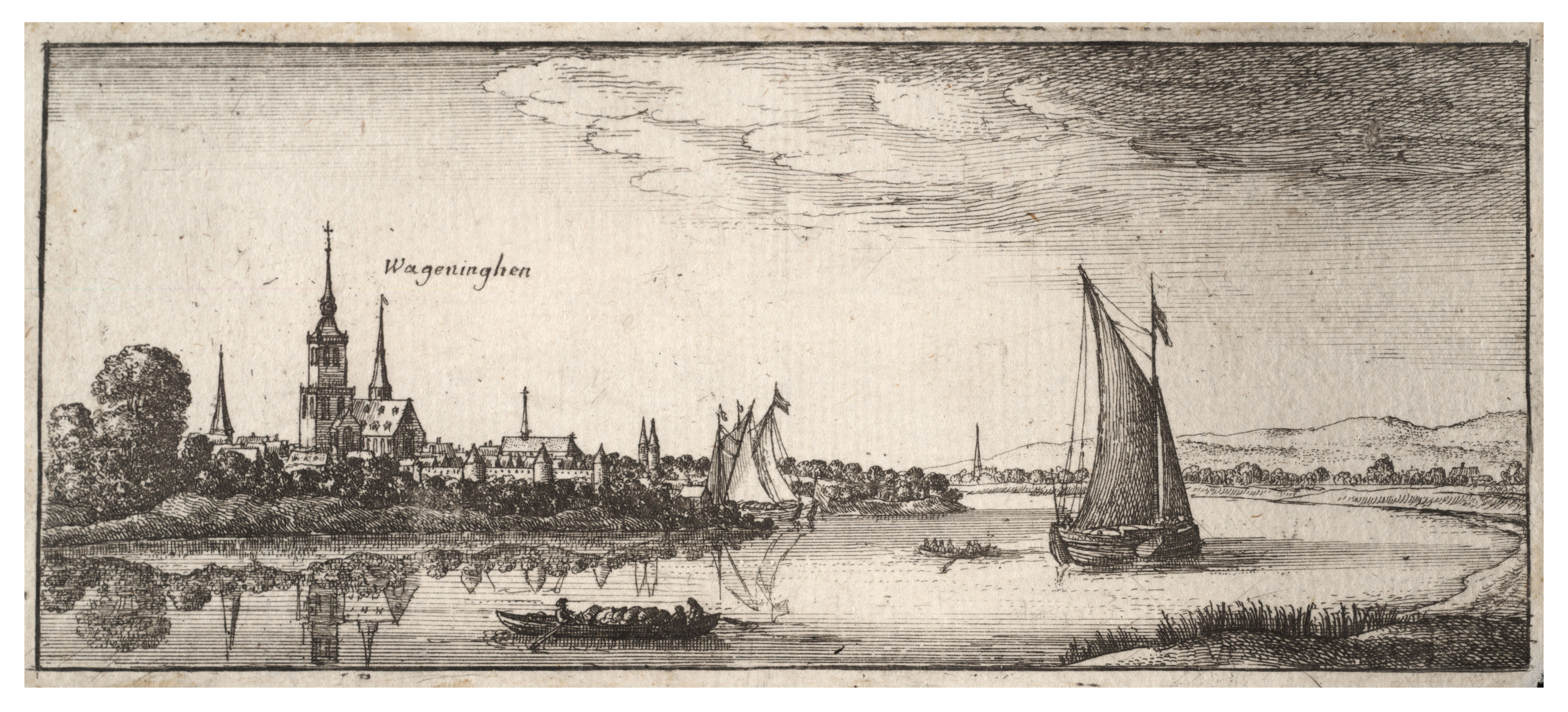
Plate made by Wenzel Hollar, 1607-1677

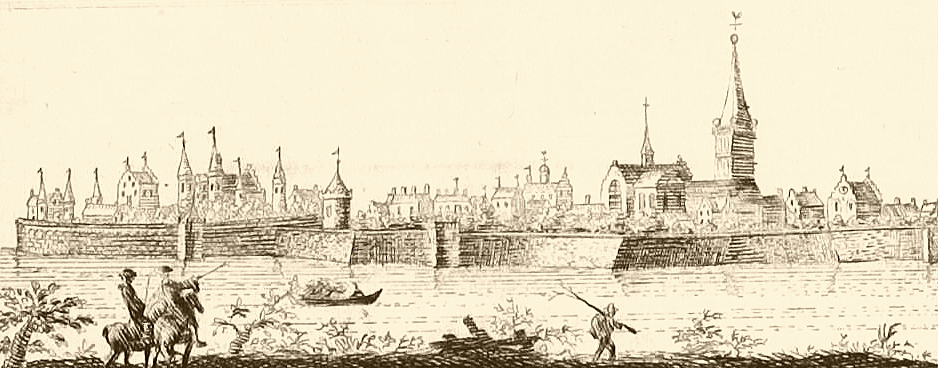
Wageningen 1730

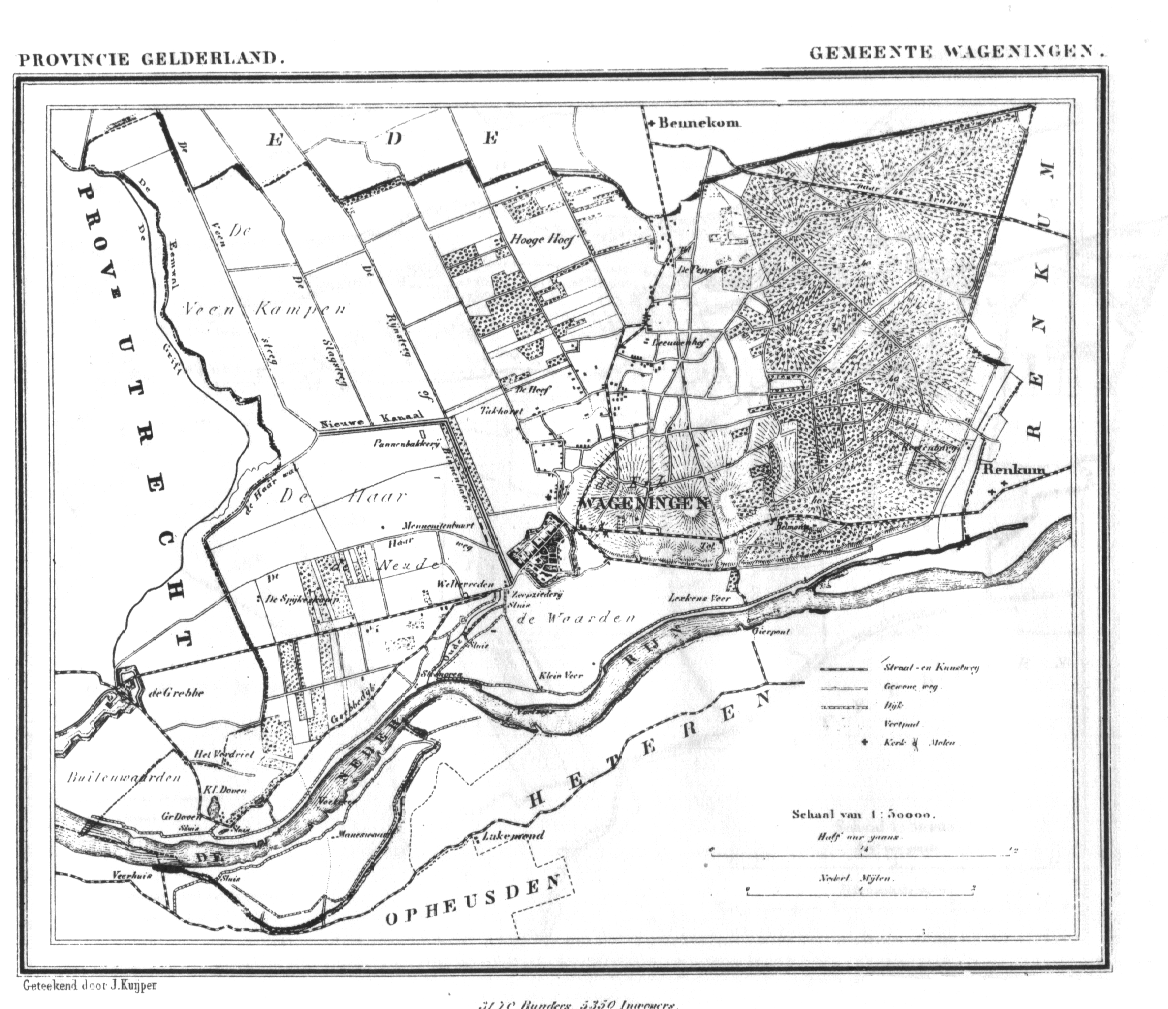
Wageningen 1867, by Jacob Kuyper

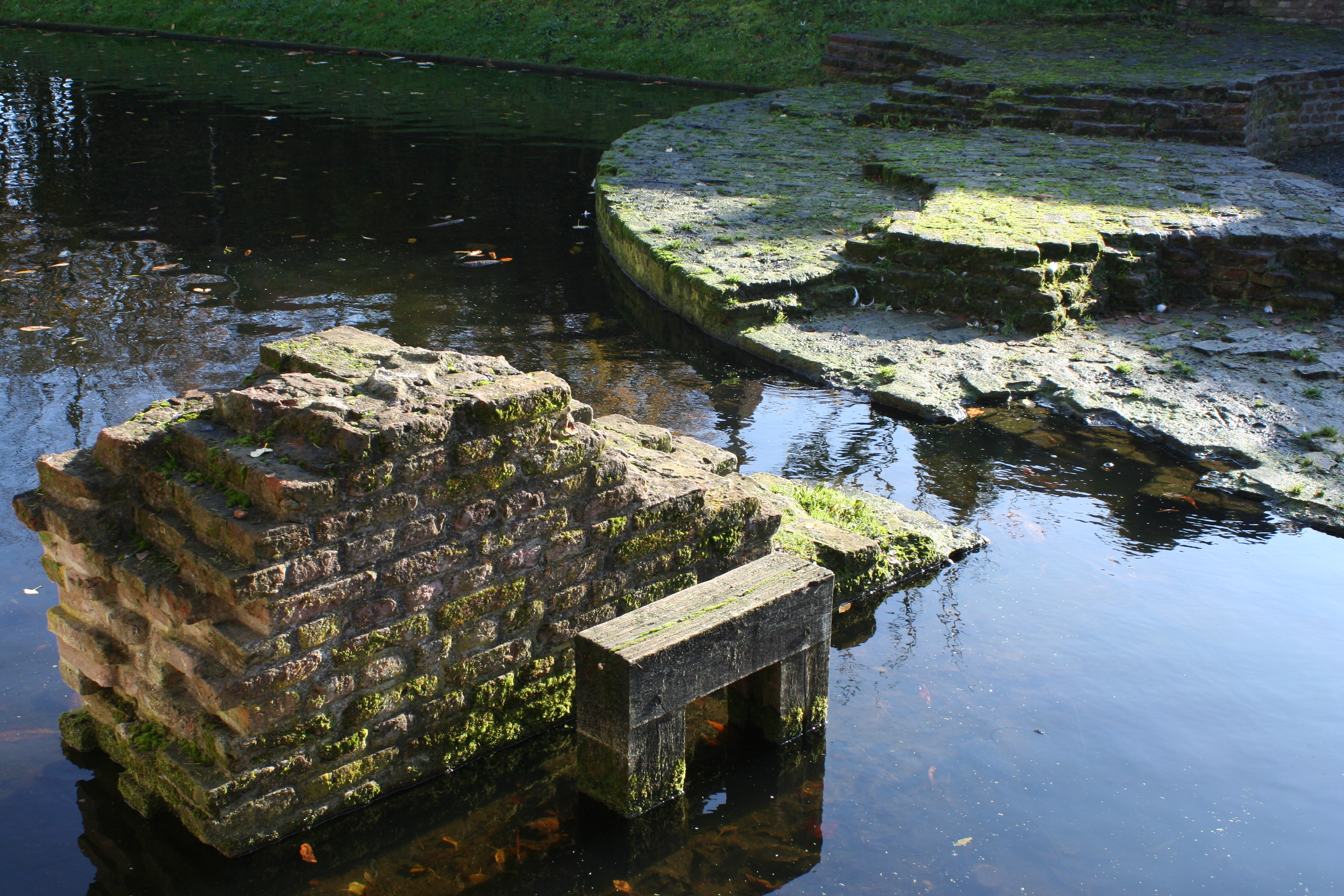
Old city ruins of the castle and city walls

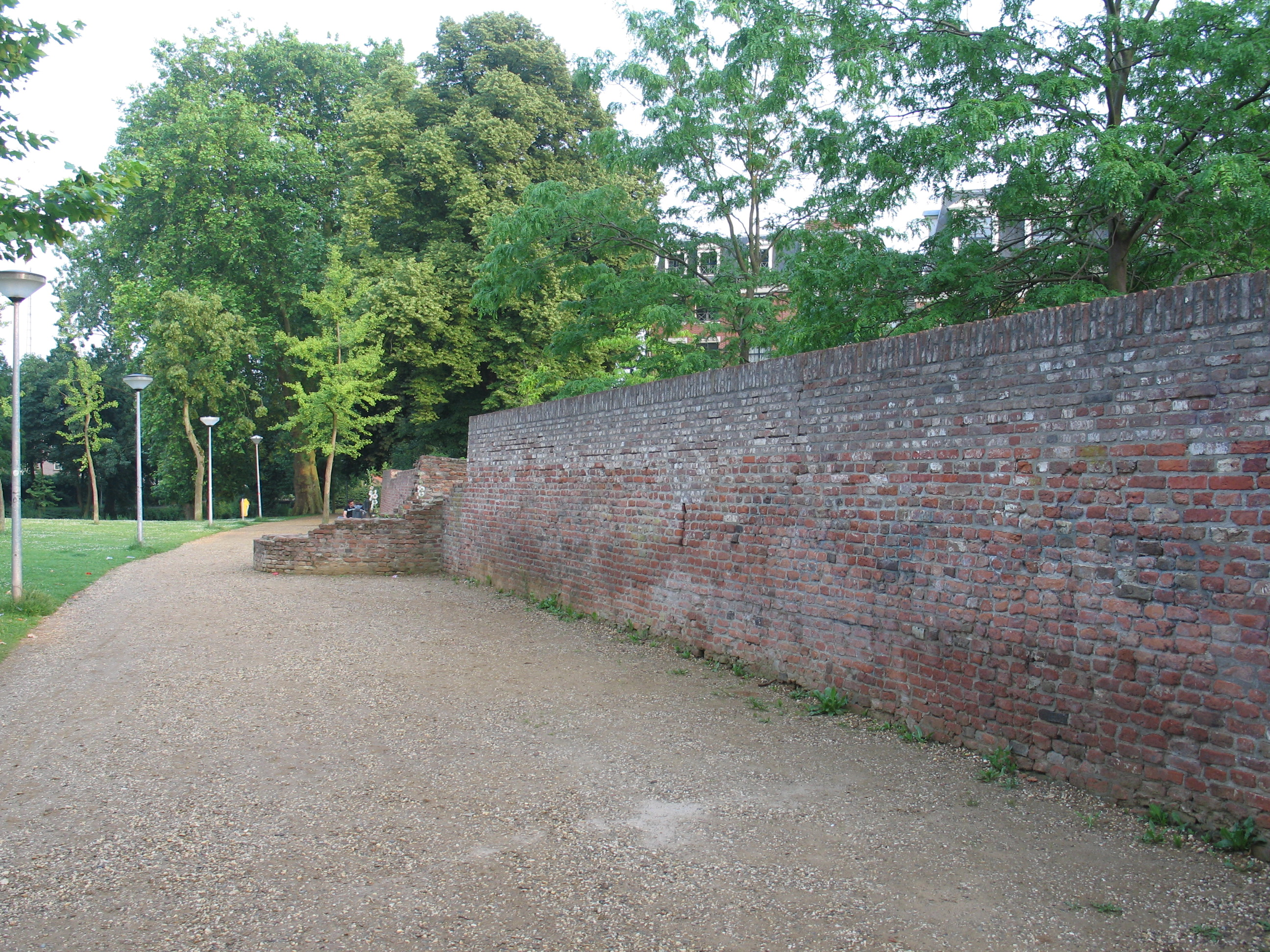
Old city ruins of the castle and city walls

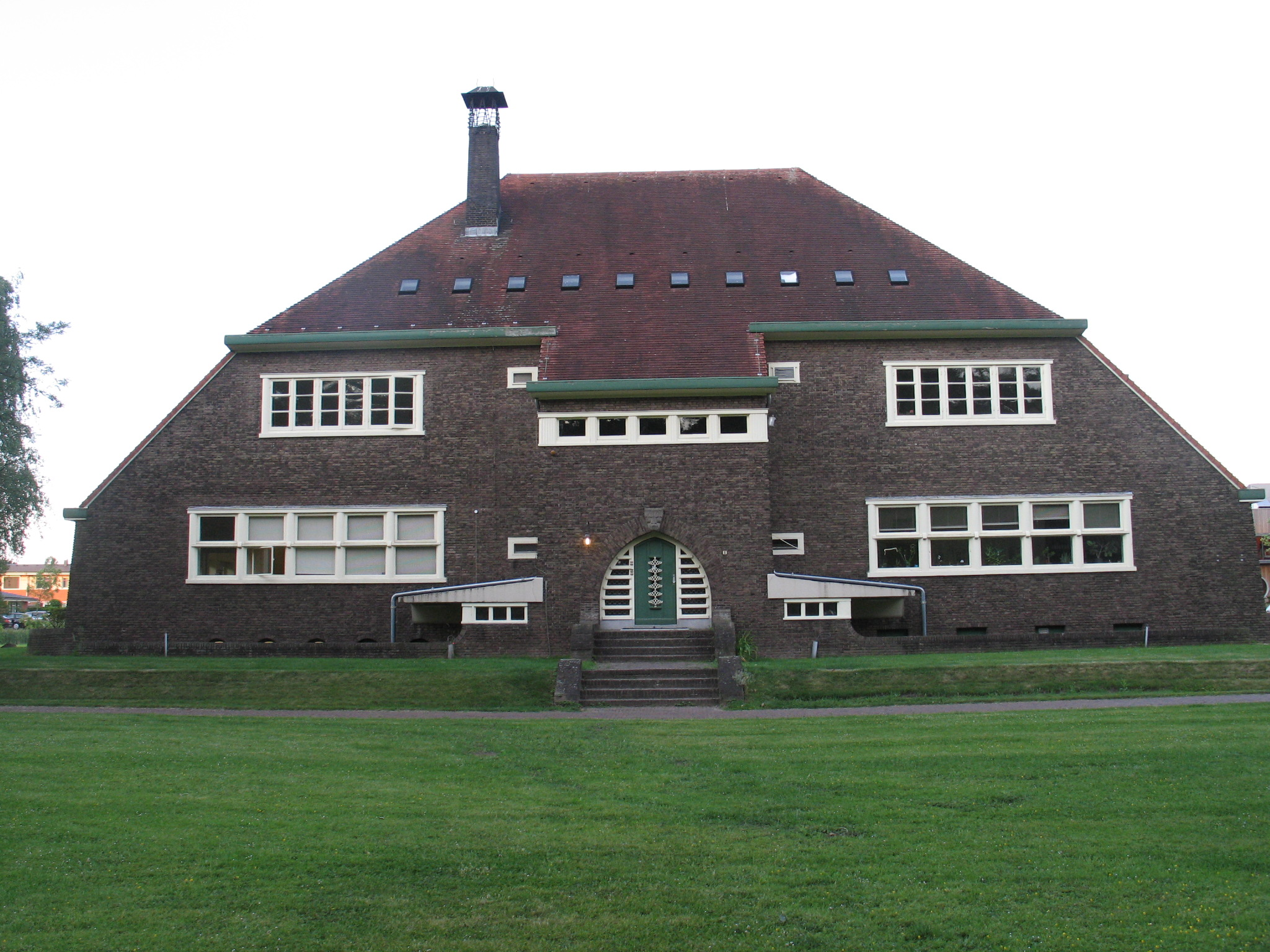
Haagsteeg

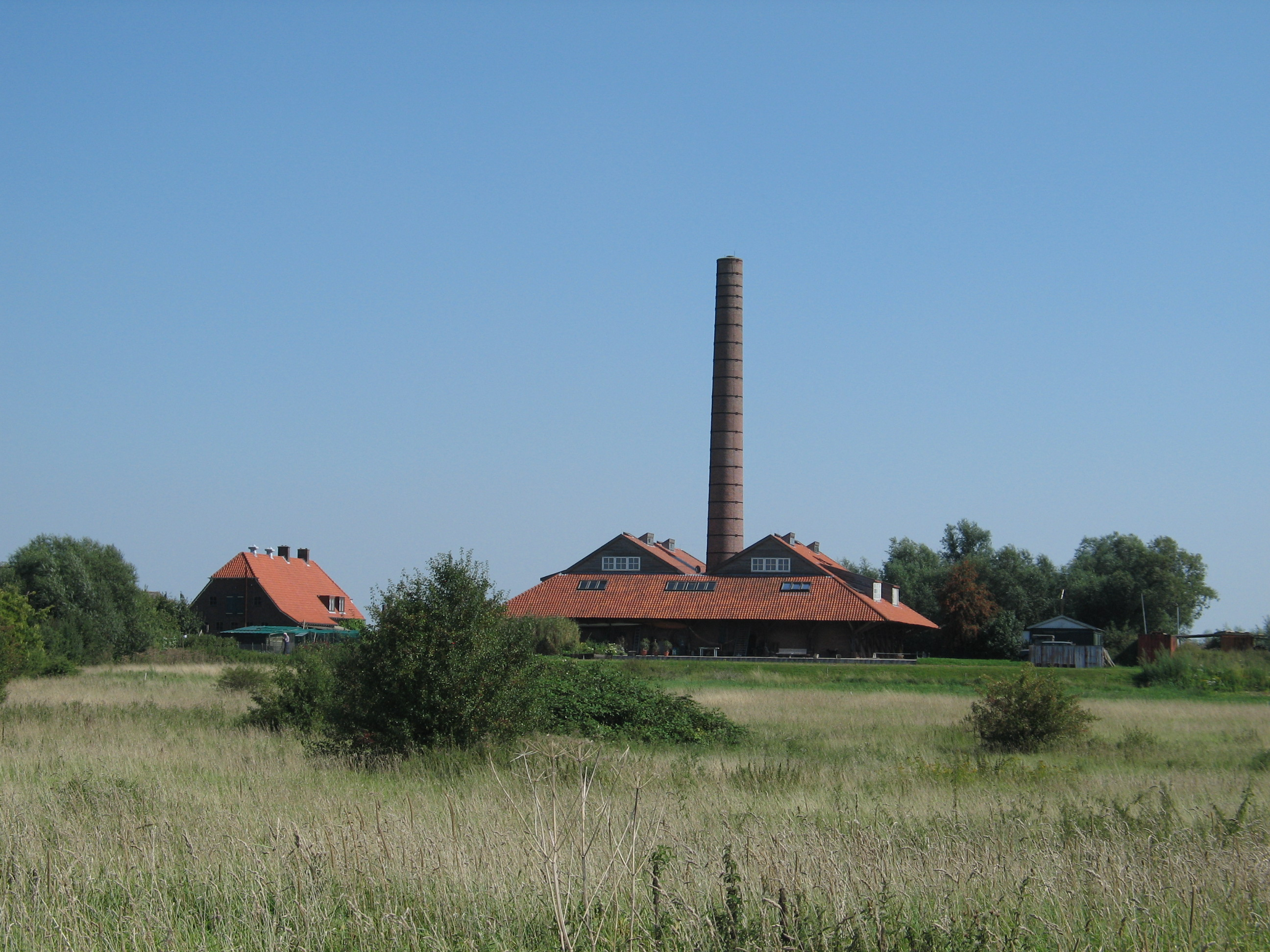
Brick factory 'De bovenste polder'

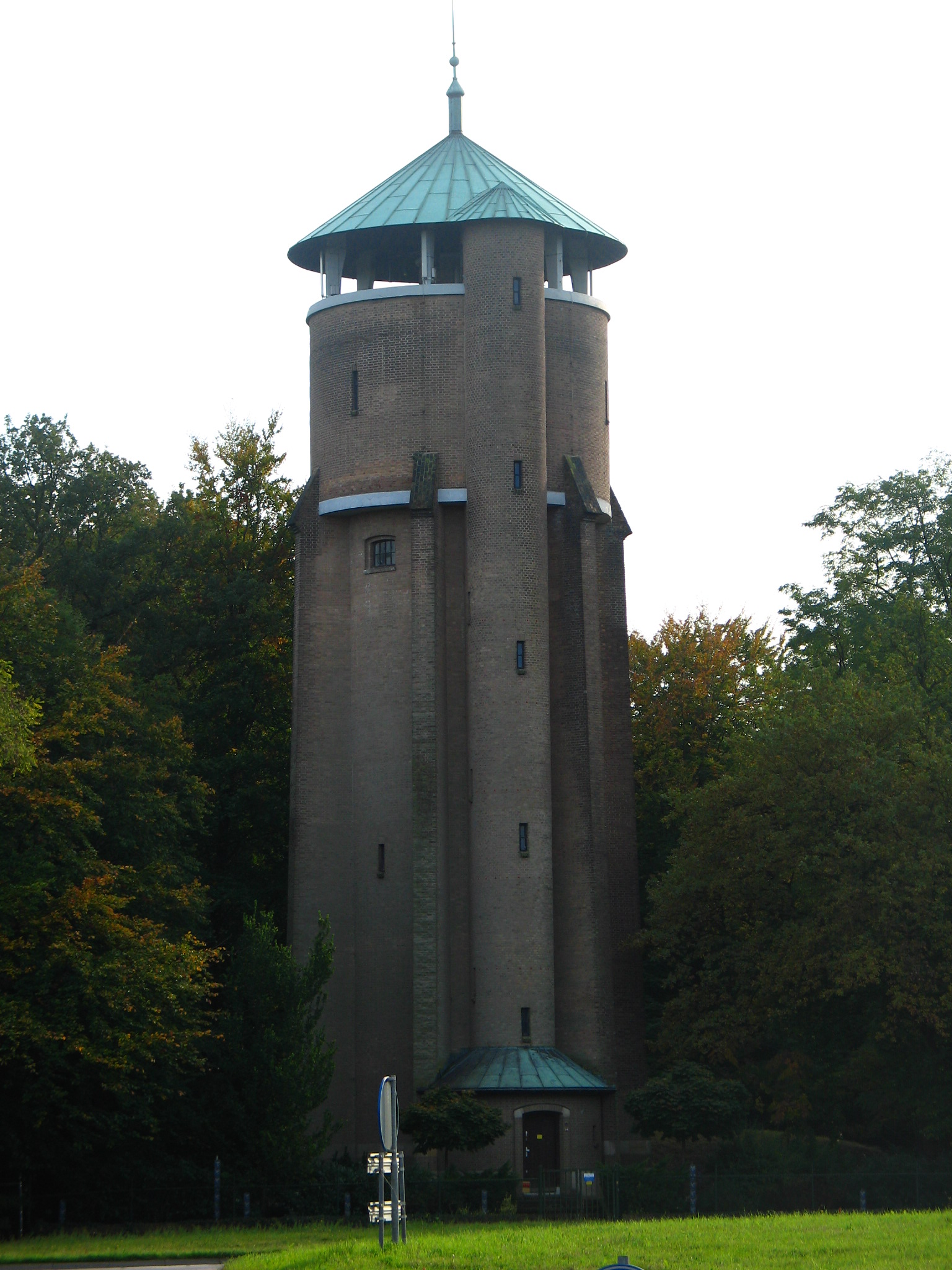
Water tower at Wageningse Berg

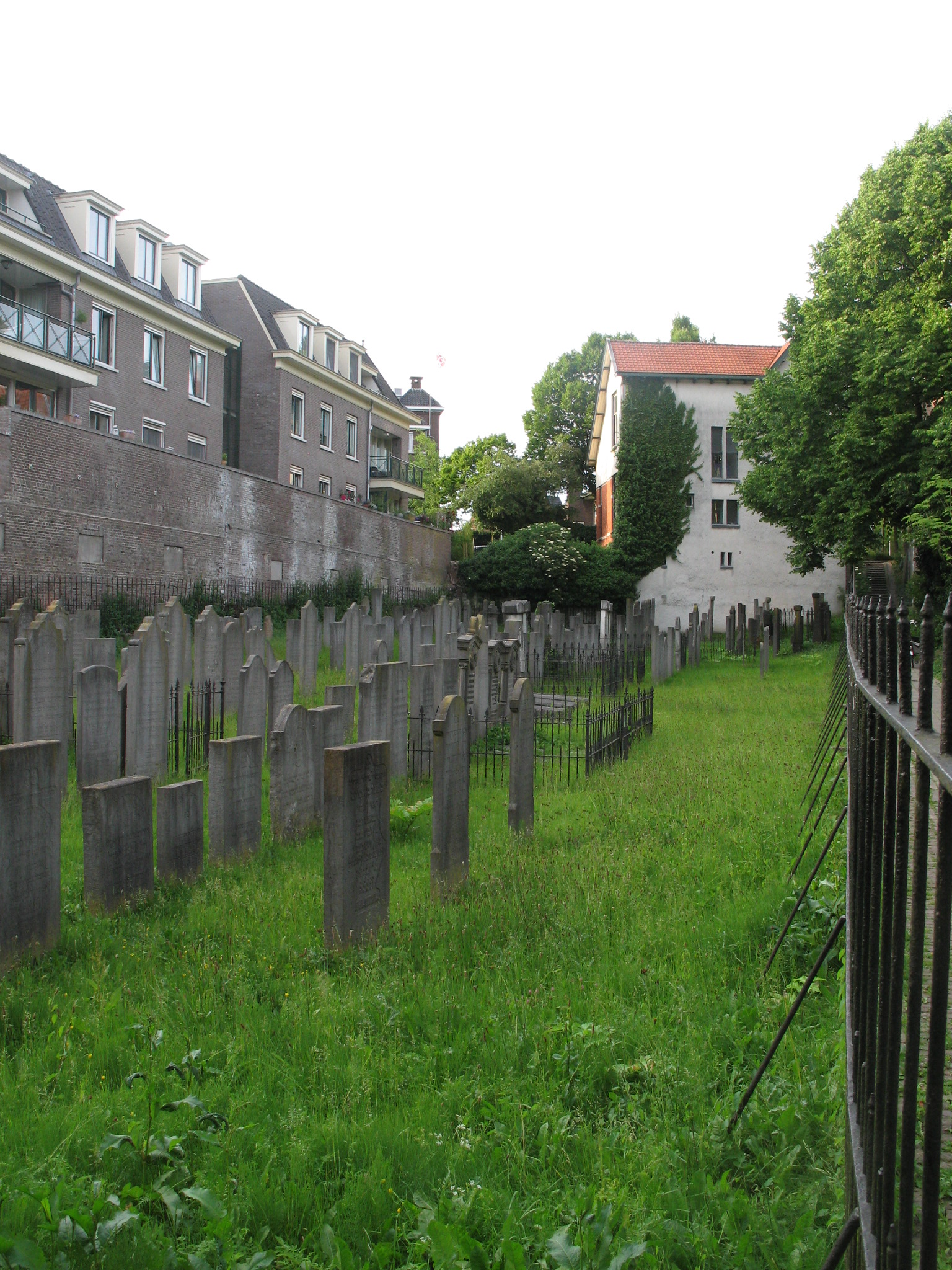
Jewish graveyard

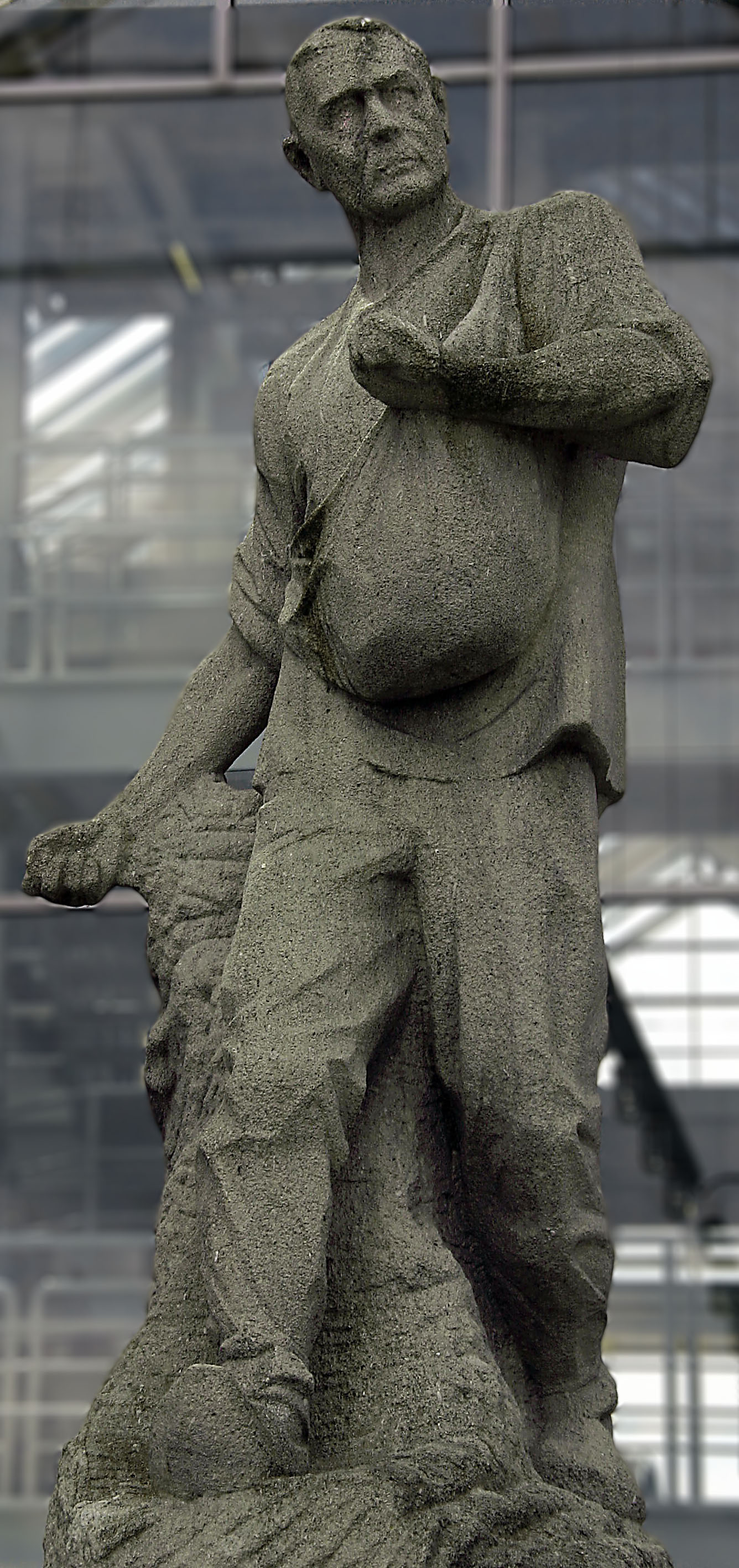
De Zaaier, by August Falise, in front of Wageningen University and Research Centre main office.

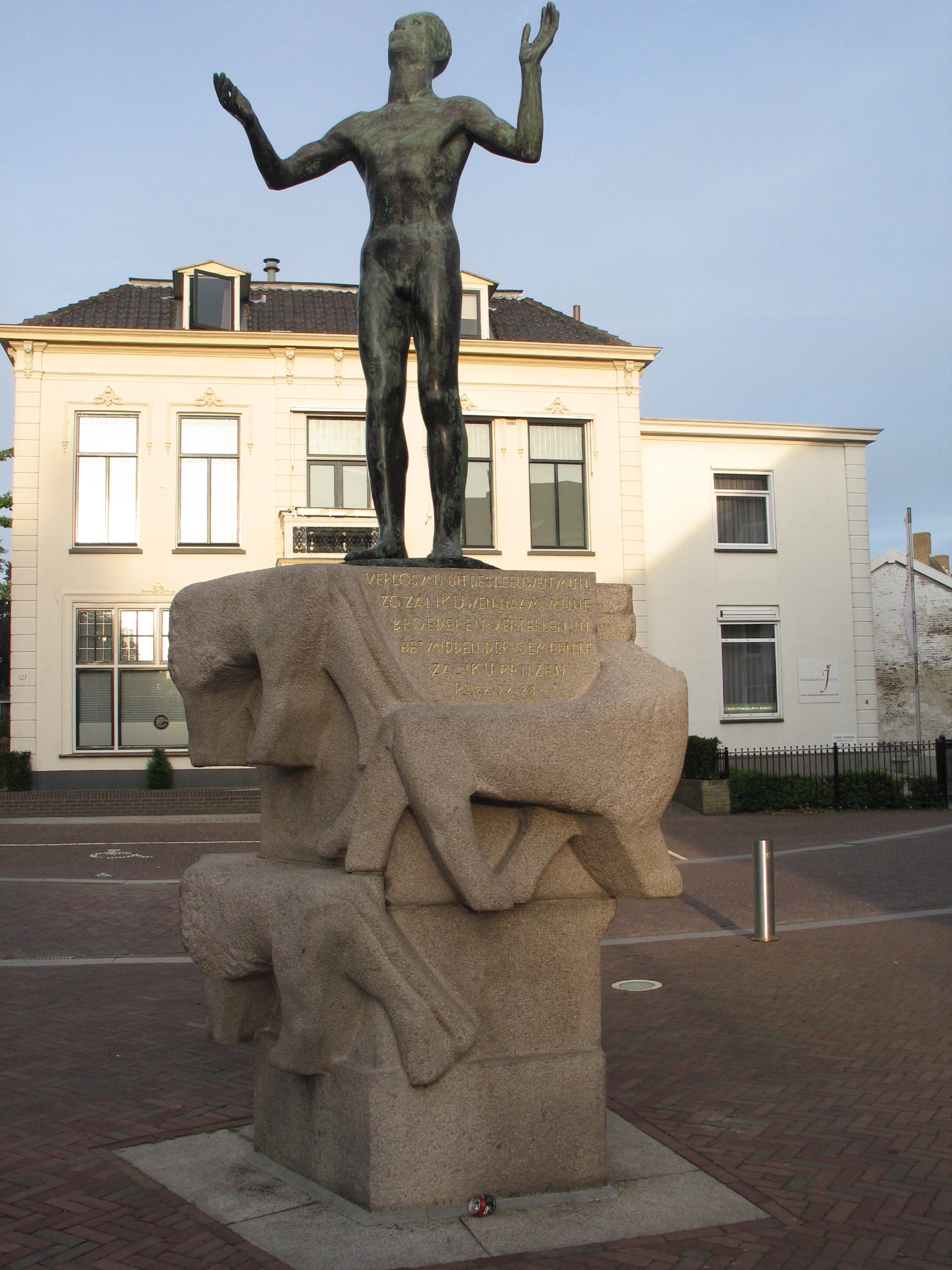
(WWII) Liberation monument

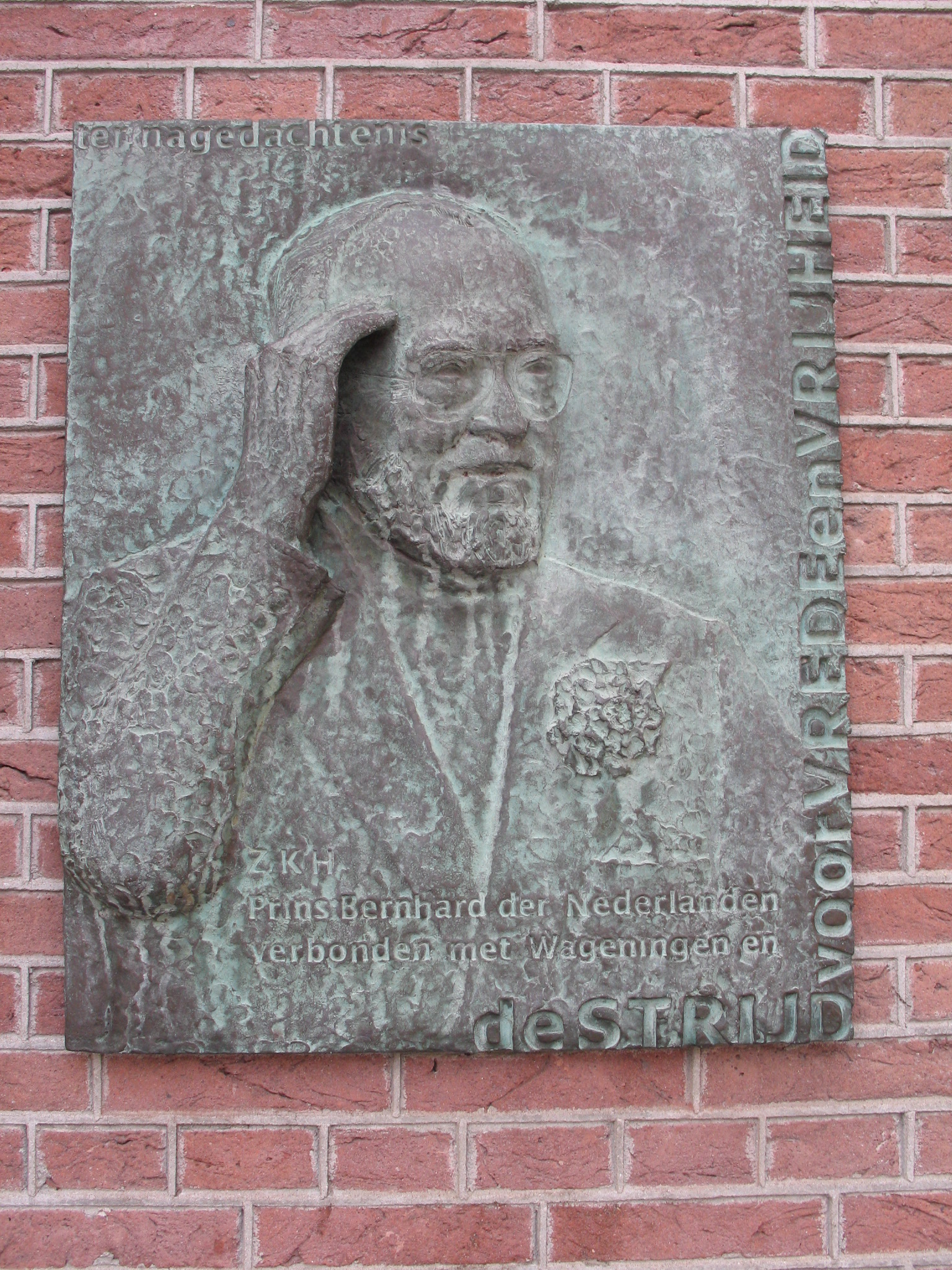
Monument Prince Bernard

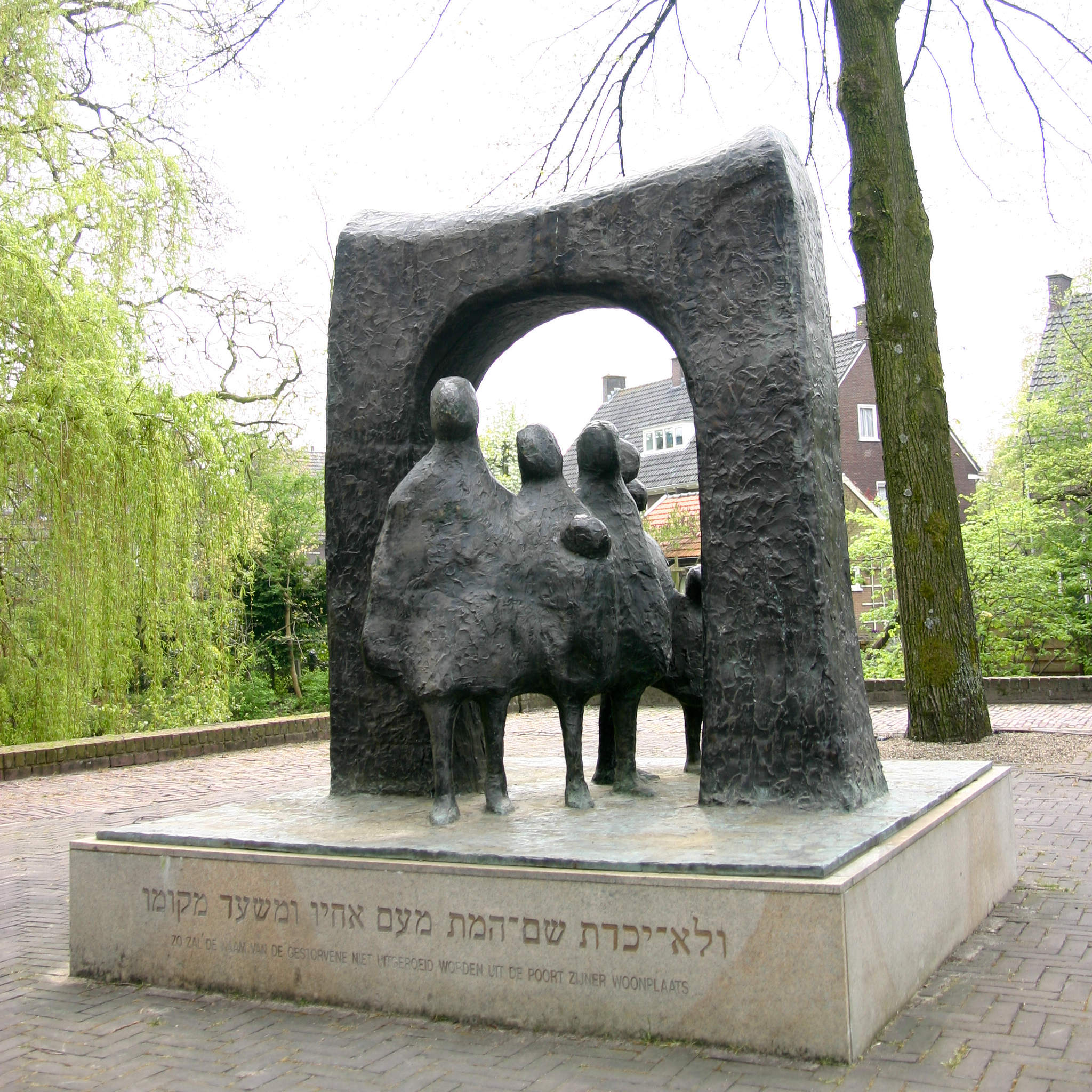
Levenspoort (Arch of Life), by Yetty Elzar, Walstraat

== See also ==
- Duchy of Guelders
- History of the Netherlands
- Holy Roman Empire
- Hotel de Wereld
- (in Dutch) List of mayors of Wageningen
- (in Dutch) List of national monuments in Wageningen
- (in Dutch) List of people from Wageningen
