= Douglass T. Greene =

United States Army general (1891–1964)

Douglass Taft Greene
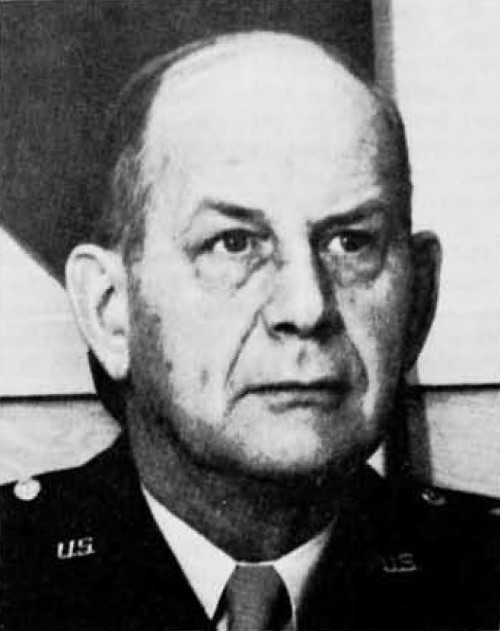
- Maj. Gen. Douglass T. Greene
- Born: April 23, 1891; Fort Logan, Colorado, United States
- Died: June 13, 1964 (aged 73); Phoenixville, Pennsylvania, United States
- Burial place: West Point Cemetery, West Point, New York, United States
- Relatives: Michael J. Lenihan (father-in-law)
- Military career
- Allegiance: United States
- Branch: United States Army
- Service years: 1913−1946
- Rank: Major General
- Nickname: Doug
- Unit: Infantry Branch
- Commands: 17th Heavy Tank Battalion; 67th Infantry Regiment; 67th Armored Regiment; 16th Armored Division; 12th Armored Division
- Conflicts: World War I World War II

Major General Douglass Taft Greene (April 23, 1891 – June 16, 1964) was a United States Army officer during World War II. He served as commanding general of the 16th Armored Division and the 12th Armored Division during their training in the United States. Despite being an officer during both World War I and World War II, he never held a combat command, and was assigned to active duty positions within the continental United States during both wars.

== Early life ==
Douglass Taft Greene was born on April 23, 1891, at Fort Logan, Colorado, the son of Colonel Lewis Douglass Greene, USMA Class of 1878, and Lillian Taft Adams Greene.

== Military career ==
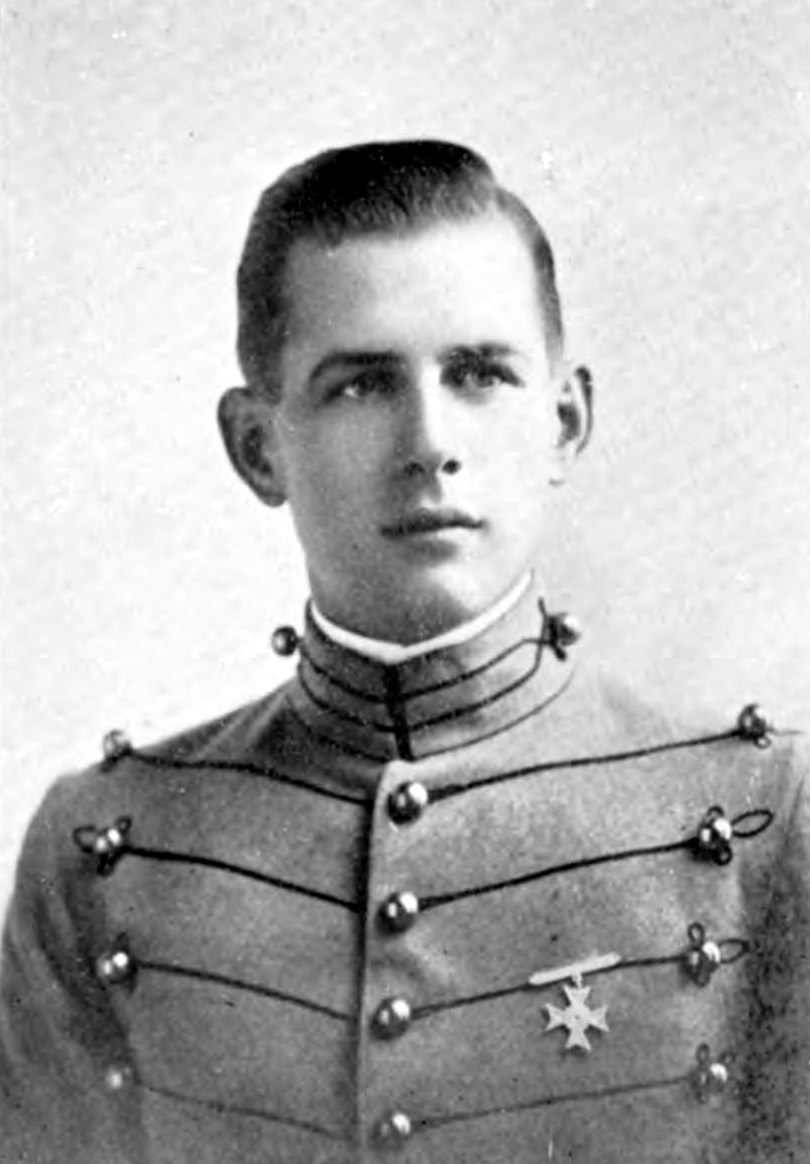
At West Point in 1913

Greene was appointed to West Point from Illinois and entered the military academy on March 1, 1909. He graduated with the Class of 1913, was commissioned as a second lieutenant and was stationed at Fort Shafter, Hawaii, with Co. I, 2nd Infantry Regiment. On May 15, 1916, he was promoted to first lieutenant and was assigned to the Schofield Barracks in Hawaii from August 17, 1916, to February 4, 1917. He was transferred to the 21st Infantry Division at Camp H. Beacom in Calexico, California, from March 16 to April 22, 1917. On May 15, 1917, he was promoted to captain of the infantry and became adjutant at Camp Beacom. From May 2 to August 15, 1917, he was an instructor at the 1st Officers Training Camp at the Presidio, San Francisco. On December 13, 1917, he was transferred to command of the 3rd Battalion, 21st Infantry Div. at Camp Taliaferro, San Diego, California. On June 17, 1918, he was promoted to major in the National Army (USA) and became adjutant of the 162nd Depot Brigade at Camp Pike, Arkansas, between June 19 and August 29, 1918. On September 1, 1918, he became an instructor in the Department of Tactics at the U.S. Military Academy at West Point until August 1922.

He attended the Infantry School at Camp Benning, Georgia, in 1922−23, then the Tank School at Fort Meade, Maryland 1923−24, the Command and General Staff School at Fort Leavenworth, Kansas, from 1928 to 1929. He became the commanding officer of the 17th Heavy Tank Battalion from 1923 to 1928. From 1929 to 1933, he was the executive officer of the Tank School at Fort Meade. From 1933 to 1934 he attended the Army War College in Washington, D.C.. From July 1934 to July 1940, he was professor of military science & tactics and commandant of the ROTC program at the Drexel Institute of Technology in Philadelphia, Pennsylvania. While he was there he was promoted to lieutenant colonel on August 1, 1935.

From 1940 to 1942, Greene, promoted on June 26, 1941, to the temporary rank of colonel, was commanding officer of the 67th Infantry Regiment and then the 67th Armored Regiment, the latter being part of the 2nd Armored Division before being promoted to the temporary rank of brigadier general on March 11, 1942 and assuming command of Combat Command "A" of the 7th Armored Division, remaining in this post until April 1943. On July 15, 1943, Greene, promoted to the temporary rank of major general on September 17, became the commanding General of the newly activated 16th Armored Division at Camp Chafee, Ark. until August 1944. On August 16, 1944, he assumed command of the 12th Armored Division from Major General Carlos Brewer as they were preparing to leave the United States to enter the European Theater of Operations during World War II, when Brewer was deemed "too old" at age 54 to be an overseas operational combat commander. However, four weeks after assuming command of the 12th Armored Division, just as the division was ready to go overseas, doctors refused to let Greene go with his command, and he was replaced as commander of the 12th Armored Division on September 19, 1944, by Major General Roderick R. Allen. After a three-week stint as deputy commander of the Second Army, Greene became the commanding general of the Infantry Replacement Training Center, at Camp Gordon, Tennessee until the end of the war, and retired due to disability in 1946.

Throughout his military career Gen. Greene held several command positions, including service during both World Wars. All of his military posting were within the United States, and he never was assigned to active combat. During World War I, he was an instructor at West Point, and during World War II he was assigned to training troops within the continental United States.

== Post-military career ==
After retirement from the military he moved back to the Drexel Hill area of Philadelphia and returned to the Drexel Institute, where he was an assistant to the president and chairman of its War Surplus Board, administering the purchase of surplus property for the institute. From 1952 to 1961, he was director of athletics and business manager at Drexel until December 31, 1961. He then became a consultant to the president of Drexel Institute of Technology, Dr. James Creese.

== Personal life ==
On May 4, 1915, Greene married Eleanora Lenihan, daughter of Brigadier General Michael J. Lenihan, USMA Class of 1887, who at the time was a major with the 2nd Infantry Division. They had six sons and a daughter. Their first child, Joseph Douglass Greene (1916–1922), born at Fort Shafter, died at Fort Benning, Georgia, at age six in 1922 while rescuing a younger brother from under a truck. Lawrence Vivans Greene (1917–2006) and Michael Joseph Lenihan Greene (1919–2012) were both members of the USMA Class of 1941. Lewis Adams Greene (1920–1987) lived at Cookeville, Tennessee, and was the only son not to have a career in the military. Their daughter Ann Catherine married R. L. Ziegler and lived at Newtown Square, Pennsylvania. His youngest son, Lt. Thomas Patrick Greene (1929–1951), USMA Class of 1950, was killed in action in Korea on February 10, 1951. Michael, Lewis, and Ann were born at West Point.

On January 28, 1964, Gen. Greene was hospitalized following a heart attack and returned home after three weeks. On June 9, 1964, he entered Valley Forge General Hospital with another heart attack and died the following day on June 13, 1964. He was interred at the West Point Cemetery, where both of his parents, his wife, his oldest and youngest sons are also buried.

Military offices
Preceded by Newly activated organization	Commanding General 16th Armored Division; 1943–1944	Succeeded by John L. Pierce
Preceded by Carlos Brewer	Commanding General 12th Armored Division; August–September 1944	Succeeded by Roderick R. Allen
