= Carlos Brewer =

United States Army general (1890–1976)

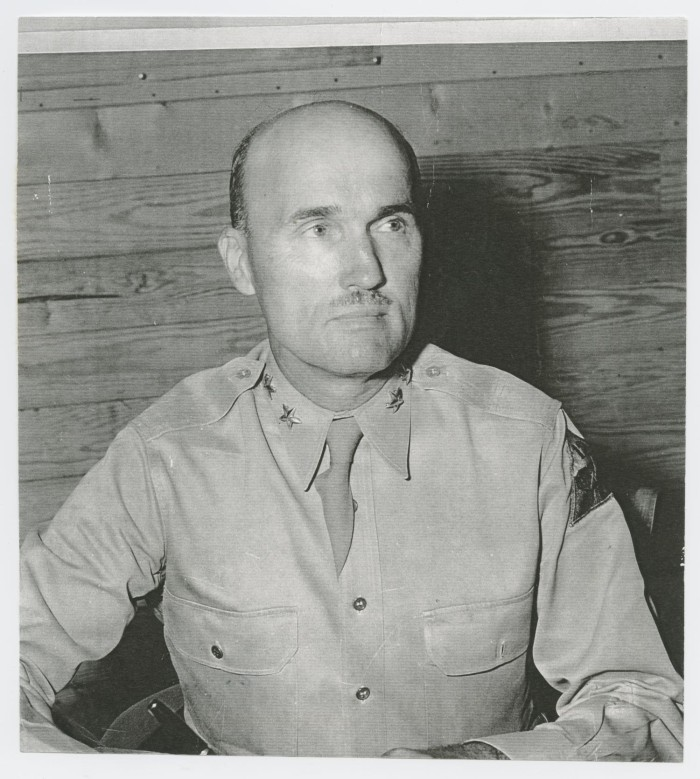
- Born: 5 December 1890; Golo, Kentucky, United States
- Died: 29 September 1976 (aged 85); Columbus, Ohio, United States
- Burial place: Arlington National Cemetery, Virginia, United States
- Military career
- Allegiance: United States
- Branch: United States Army
- Service years: 1913–1950
- Rank: Major General
- Service number: 0-3539
- Unit: Field Artillery Branch
- Commands: 2nd Battalion, 25th Field Artillery Regiment; 7th Field Artillery Regiment; 12th Armored Division
- Conflicts: World War I World War II
- Awards: Legion of Merit; Bronze Star

Major General Carlos Brewer (5 December 1890 – 29 September 1976) was a United States Army officer who commanded the 12th Armored Division during World War II. After training the 12th Armored Division, he was not permitted to command the division in combat due to his age, so he requested his rank be reverted from major general to Colonel so that he could become an artillery officer in the European Theater of Operations (ETO). He innovated the method of field artillery targeting used in World War II, and implemented triangular organization of divisions.

== Early life ==
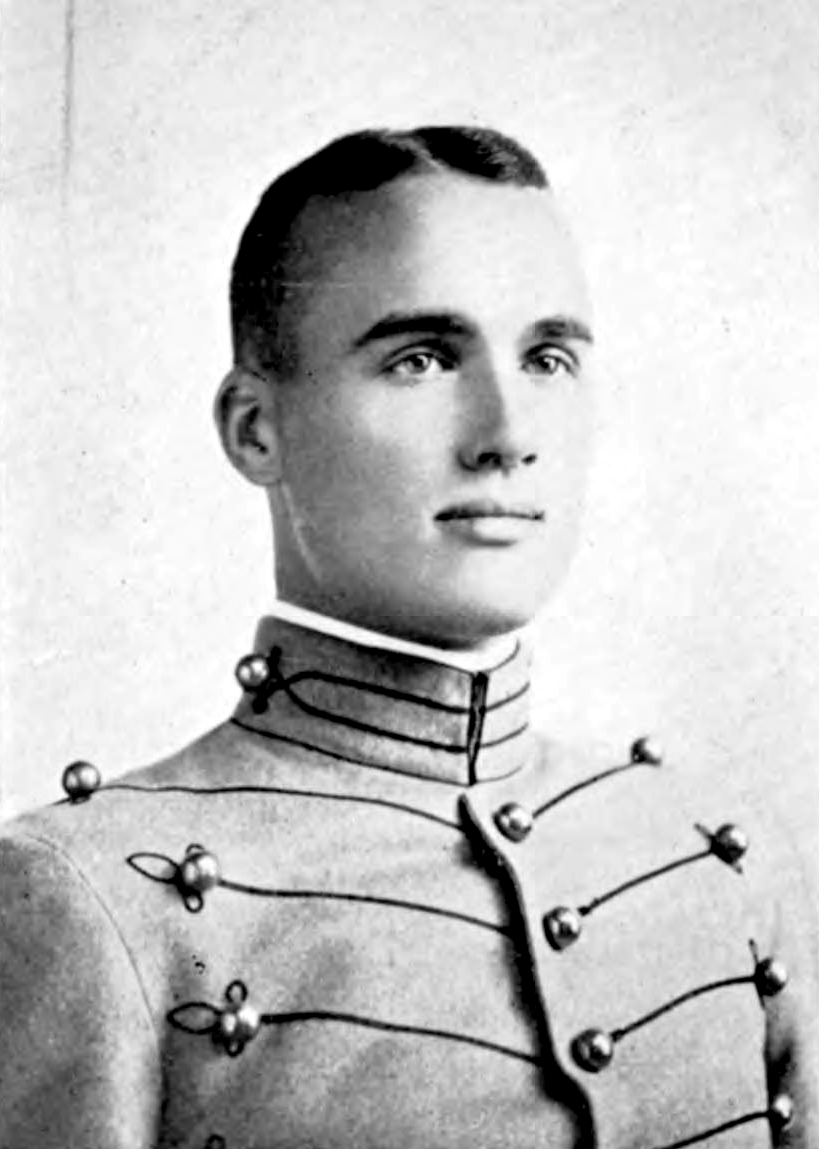
At West Point in 1913

Carlos Brewer was born on 5 December 1890 in Golo, Kentucky and attended West Kentucky College in Mayfield, Kentucky, until he entered United States Military Academy (USMA) at West Point, New York in 1909, graduating 15th in his class in 1913.

After graduation, Brewer went onto the Field Artillery Branch of the United States Army.

== Military career ==
Upon graduation from West Point in 1913, Brewer was commissioned as a second lieutenant and was assigned to the 3rd Field Artillery at Fort Sam Houston, serving along the Texas border until 1916 during the Mexican Revolution. In March 1916, he went with the 4th Field Artillery to the Panama Canal Zone. From August 1916 through 1921, he taught in the Department of Mathematics at the USMA, missing out combat during World War I. In 1920, he was promoted to major and, from 1921 through to 1924, he went to the 8th Field Artillery in Hawaii.

Brewer studied at the Advanced Course at the United States Army Field Artillery School at Ft. Sill, Oklahoma, in 1926–1927, and then graduated at the top of his class at the United States Army Command and General Staff College at Fort Leavenworth (1927–1928). He went back to the Field Artillery School in 1928 and taught in the Gunnery Department, becoming the Director of the department. His immediate predecessor as head of the Department of Gunnery, who was also an instructor when Brewer took advanced coursework there, was Jacob L. Devers, who would remain a lifelong friend and later prove providential in the course of his career.

The Artillery School's most innovative work came with the creation of the fire direction center during the 1930s under the leadership of its Director of Gunnery, Carlos Brewer and his instructors, who abandoned massing fire by a described terrain feature or grid coordinate reference. They introduced a firing chart, adopted the practice of locating battery positions by survey, and designated targets with reference to the base point on the chart. In the spring of 1931, the Gunnery Department successfully demonstrated massing battalion fire using this method.

During his period as Director of the Department of Gunnery, [Brewer] developed the technique of fire direction with a central fire direction center in the battalion which proved very effective in World War II. This procedure permitted the massing of fire of all the divisional artillery on a target that one battery had adjusted on, or on a target that the division commander had designated, in a matter of minutes. One big advantage of this central fire control is that a few specialists can perform the necessary technical operations for the entire battalion. As a result of this development, the division commanders were generally well pleased with the artillery support in World War II.

Brewer graduated from the Army War College in 1934 with a superior rating. While his wife was convalescing due to tuberculosis, he became head of the Military Science Department of the ROTC Program at Purdue University, the largest field artillery unit in the Army at the time. On 1 August 1935 he was promoted to lieutenant colonel. In 1939, he was assigned to command the 25th Field Artillery Battalion at Madison Barracks, NY. In 1941, he was then transferred to Fort Benning, GA to command the 7th Field Artillery Regiment, where he developed the triangular division organization that was adopted during World War II. After 2 months of courses at the Naval War College, he served as Assistant, then Chief of Staff (G-3) for the newly activated 9th Infantry Division, now commanded by his mentor, Major General Jacob L. Devers, at Fort Bragg, NC from August 1940 to February 1942. On 26 June 1941, he was promoted to the temporary rank of colonel Brewer planned and implemented the triangular division organization for the 9th Infantry Division consisting of 3 infantry regiments and 4 artillery battalions, constituting 9,000 soldiers, with an additional 5,000 draftees completing the ranks, beginning in 1941.

On 16 February 1942, Brewer was promoted to temporary brigadier general and given command of a unit of the 6th Armored Division. On 7 August 1942, he was promoted to temporary major general, and assumed command of the new 12th Armored Division on 19 August 1942, which was activated at Camp Campbell, Kentucky, on 2 September 1942. He oversaw their training through the Tennessee Maneuvers, from September into November 1943 and re-organization from a heavy to a medium tank division. He continued to supervise the training of the 12th Armored Division at Camp Barkeley, near Abilene, Texas, from November 1943, until August 1944 when the Division prepared to depart for the European Theater of Operations.

Despite the 12th Armored Division receiving excellent ratings in its final evaluation of readiness for combat service, Brewer was relieved of command and assigned to training replacement troops at Camp Wheeler, Georgia. General George C. Marshall, the U.S. Army Chief of Staff, informed Brewer that the Supreme Allied Commander of the Allied forces in Western Europe, General Dwight D. Eisenhower had requested that only commanders of divisions younger than 50 years old be sent to command soldiers in the European Theater of Operations, and Brewer was 53 years old at the time. Brewer was replaced as Commanding General of the 12th Armored Division by Douglass T. Greene, who had been in his 1913 graduating class at West Point.

=== World War II combat ===
Brewer had missed combat duty during World War I because he had been on the faculty teaching at West Point and was not enamored with having a non-combat command again. He requested termination of his rank of major general and permanent reversion to the rank of colonel, then he wrote to Devers who had been his instructor at Field Artillery School, whom he replaced as its director, and for whom he served as Chief of Staff with the 9th Infantry Division. Devers was by now in command of the newly formed Sixth United States Army Group leading the Allied invasion in the south of France, which consisted of the U.S. Seventh Army, under Lieutenant General Alexander Patch, and the First French Army under Gen. Jean de Lattre de Tassigny. His former command, the 12th Armored Division was assigned to Patch's Seventh Army. Brewer asked Devers if as a colonel he could command the newly formed 46th Group Heavy Army Artillery assigned to the Seventh Army, commanded by Patch who had been in the same graduating class at West Point and with whom he served under Jacob Devers with the 9th Infantry Division. The 46th Field Artillery Group under Col. Brewer began its combat operations in January 1945 in the Vosges Mountains, providing heavy artillery support for the VI Corps, commanded by Major General Edward H. Brooks. They continued support of the Corps through its advance into Germany through the Siegfried Line, across the Rhine river, through the Black Forest and into Bavaria. Their combat ended at Garmisch when the Germans surrendered on 8 May 1945, which brought the end of World War II in Europe.

=== Post-World War II ===
Brewer served in the Army of Occupation under the command of Lieutenant General Geoffrey Keyes, another West Point classmate, as the Seventh Army Artillery Officer and as Headquarters Commandant & Commander of the Heidelberg Area Command in Germany from 1946 to 1947. From 1947 to 1950, he was Professor of Military Science & Tactics at Ohio State University where he ran the ROTC Program. He retired from the military in 1950, but continued working for the Ohio State Research Foundation from 1950 to 1960 as a consultant on classified military research contracts.

== Personal life ==
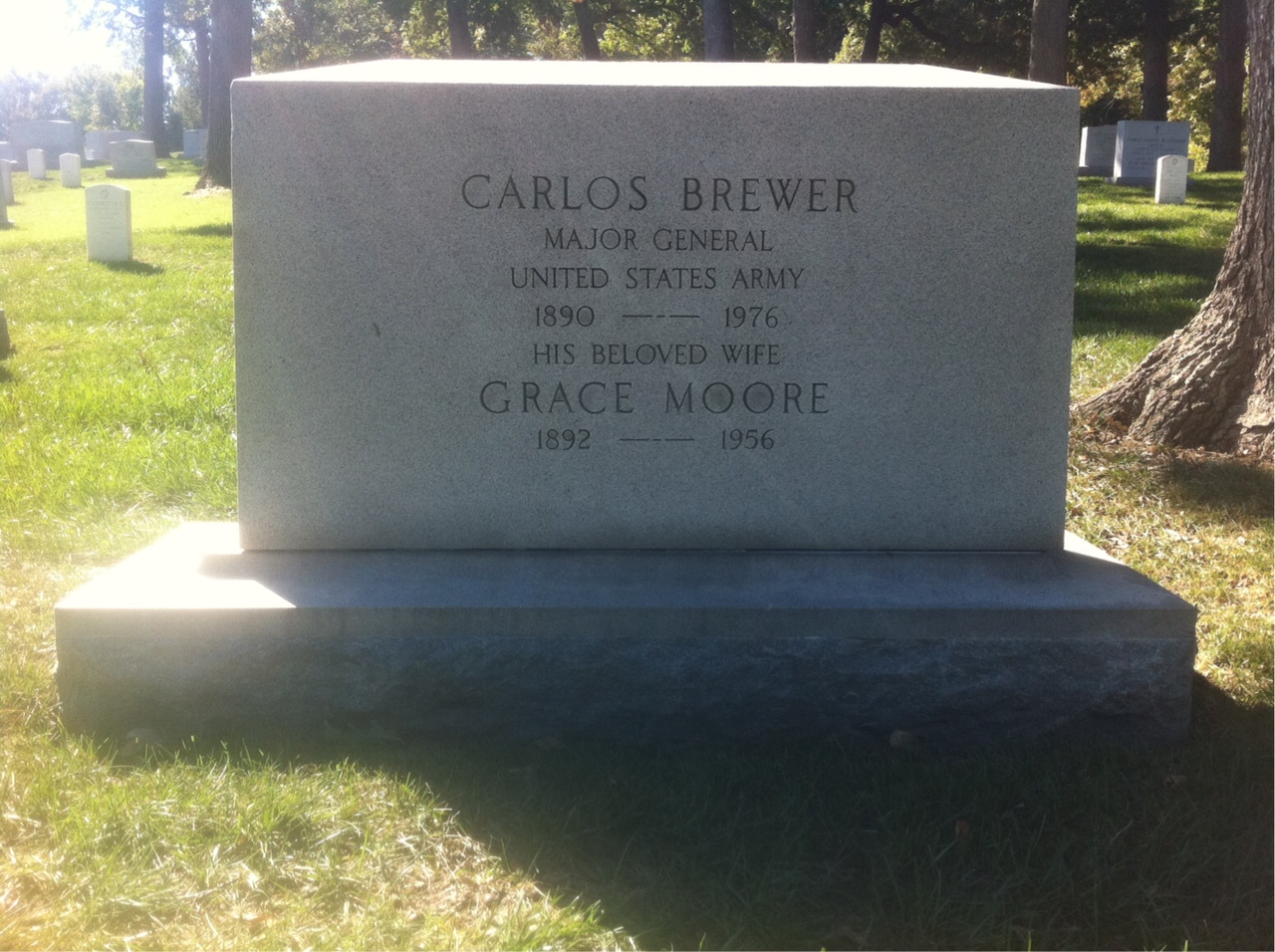
The grave of Major General Carlos Brewer at Arlington National Cemetery

He married Grace Moore (1891–1956) on 20 December 1913. They had four children: Carlos Jr., Sherman (Ted), Robert (Bob), and Grace Elizabeth (Betty) Brewer Schulten. After the death of his first wife from tuberculosis in 1956, he married Mary Taylor Williams in 1959.

At West Point, he was on the polo team, was an expert marksman, and was on the broadsword team.

He also was an avid chess player, and was one of twenty players at West Point who played simultaneous games against nine-year old Polish chess prodigy Samuel Reshevsky in 1920. Reshevsky won 19 of the 20 games, including the game against Brewer, which lasted just under two hours.

He was buried at Arlington National Cemetery, in Arlington, Virginia.

== Awards ==
Major General Brewer's ribbon bar

== See also ==
- 12th Armored Division (United States)
- 6th Armored Division (United States)
- Sixth United States Army Group
- Seventh United States Army

Military offices
Preceded by Newly activated organization	Commanding General 12th Armored Division; 1942–1944	Succeeded by Douglass T. Greene
