= Golo, Kentucky =

Unincorporated community in Kentucky, United States

- Unincorporated community
- Location within Kentucky Location within the United States
- Coordinates: 36°44′20″N 88°29′43″W
- Country: United States
- State: Kentucky
- County: Graves
- Elevation: 518 ft (158 m)
- Time zone: UTC-6 (Central (CST))
  - Summer (DST): UTC-5 (CDT)
- GNIS feature ID: 492948

Golo is an unincorporated community in Graves County, Kentucky, United States.

== Notable people ==
- United States Army General Carlos Brewer was born in Golo.
