= 12th Armored Division (United States) =

Unit of the United States Army (1942–1945)

- 12th Armored Division shoulder sleeve insignia
- Active: 15 September 1942 – 3 December 1945
- Country: United States
- Branch: United States Army
- Type: Armor
- Role: Armored warfare
- Size: Division
- Nickname: "Hellcat Division" "Suicide Division" "Mystery Division"
- Motto: Speed Is the Password
- Engagements: World War II: Rhineland; Ardennes-Alsace; Central Europe

Commanders
- Notable commanders: Roderick R. Allen

Insignia
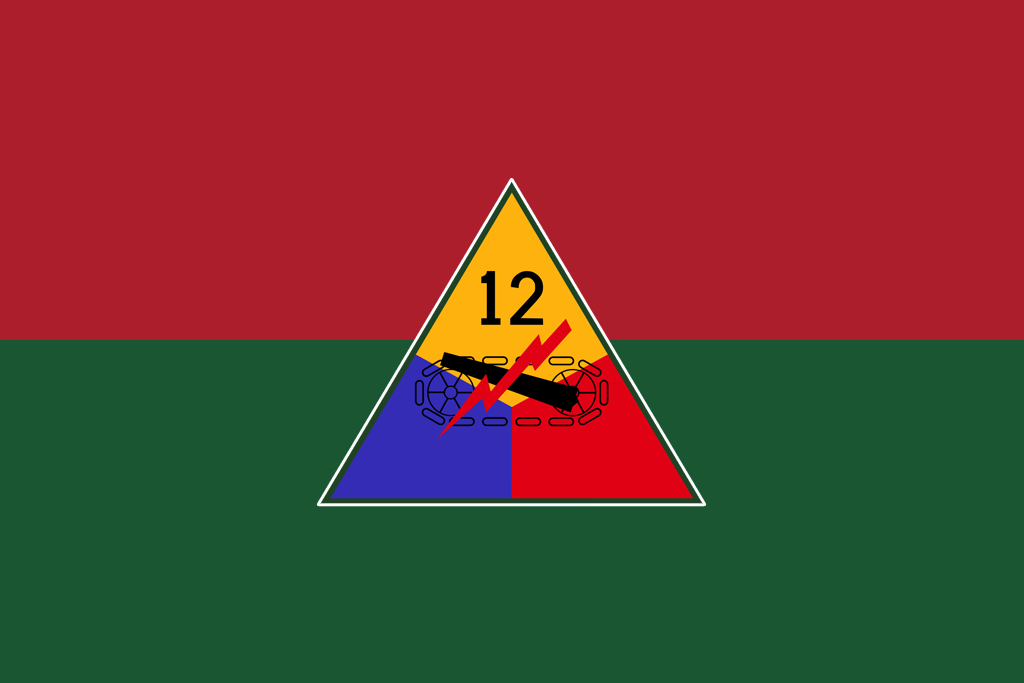
- Flag of the United States Army 12th Armored Division

The 12th Armored Division was an armored division of the United States Army in World War II. It fought in the European Theater of Operations in France, Germany and Austria, between November 1944 and May 1945.

The German Army called the 12th Armored Division the "Suicide Division" for its fierce defensive actions during Operation Nordwind in France, and they were nicknamed the "Mystery Division" when they were temporarily transferred to the command of the Third Army under General George S. Patton Jr., to cross the Rhine River.

The 12th Armored Division was one of only ten U.S. divisions (and only one of two U.S. armored divisions) during World War II that had African-American combat companies integrated into the division. The group was known as Company D. One of the African American soldiers, Staff Sergeant Edward A. Carter Jr. was awarded The Distinguished Service Cross for gallantry in combat during World War II, and was later awarded the Medal of Honor posthumously.

== History ==
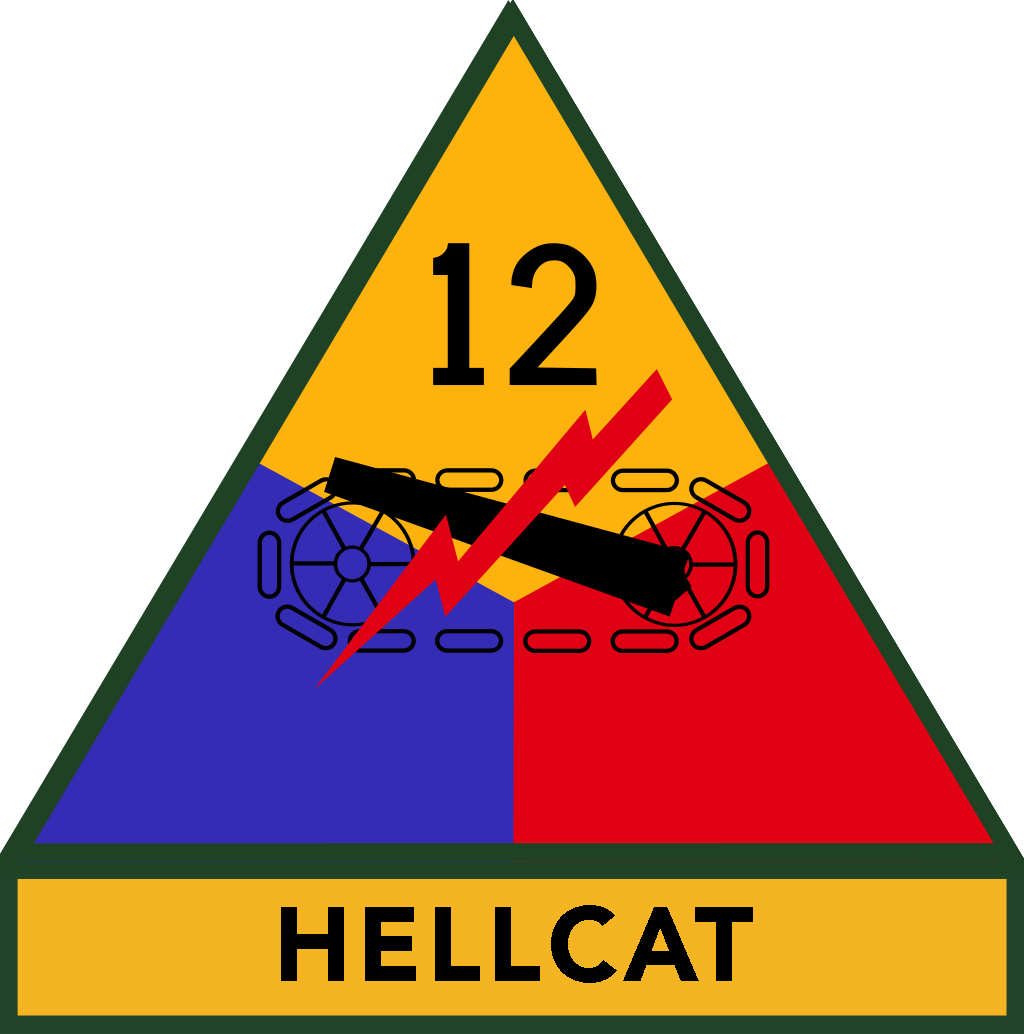
12th Armored Division "Hellcat" Insignia

The 12th Armored Division was activated in the Army of the United States on 15 September 1942. Organization and initial training was at Camp Campbell, Kentucky, and continued at Camp Barkeley in Abilene, Texas. The division consisted of approximately 11,000 soldiers, and was composed of tank, field artillery, motorized infantry battalions and other support units. (Note: Division complement at the end of 1944 was 10,937; a total of over 17,000 soldiers had been assigned to the 12th AD between 1942 and deactivation in 1946, including the 44th Armored Bn transferred to the Pacific Theater of Operations, casualties and replacement troops who saw service)

The division adopted the nickname "The Hellcats," officially announced on February 1, 1943. It was the result of a contest open to all personnel in the division during training symbolizing its toughness and readiness for combat. (Note: "In early 1943, Private Francis Beckman (493rd Armored Field Artillery Battery C) won a division contest to come up with a nickname, earning a three-day weekend pass.")

While at Camp Barkeley, the 44th Tank Battalion was sent to the Pacific Theater of Operations in March 1944 on a special mission and later distinguished itself as the first unit to enter Manila. The 44th was replaced by the 714th Tank Battalion, which rejoined the division after having been previously reassigned in a reorganization in November 1943.

Walt Disney designed a logo for the 714th Tank Battalion.

=== Origin of Combat Units ===
The 12th was originally organized as a heavy armored division with two armored regiments, the 43rd and 44th, and one armored infantry regiment, the 56th Armored Infantry Regiment. In November 1943, it was reorganized from a heavy division to a light division as part of a general streamlining of all armored divisions, except the 1st, 2nd and 3rd, which were already overseas.

==== Tank Battalions ====
The original 43rd and 44th Armored Regiments were reorganized as the 23rd, 43rd, 44th, 714th and 779th Tank Battalions during the reorganization the division underwent while at the Tennessee Maneuver Area in Watertown, Tennessee, in November 1943. The 714th Tank Battalion was separated from the division and sent to Fort Jackson, South Carolina, while the 779th Tank Battalion went to Fort Knox, Kentucky. The 44th Tank Battalion was detached from the 12th AD in March 1944 and sent to the Pacific Theater of Operations, where it distinguished itself as the first tank battalion to enter the city of Manila and liberated American and Allied civilian prisoners interred in the Santo Tomas Internment Camp. It was replaced by the 714th Tank Battalion, which rejoined the 12th AD. The 779th Tank Battalion was sent to the Philippines late in the war, but did not see any combat action.

==== Armored Infantry Battalions ====
The 56th Armored Infantry Regiment (AIR) traced its historical origin back to the 17th Infantry Regiment of Maj. Gen. George Sykes' 2nd Division of the 5th Army Corps, of the Army of the Potomac during the American Civil War. During World War I, soldiers from the reconstituted 17th Infantry Regiment were used to form the 56th Infantry Regiment on 15 May 1917, which was involved in the battle around Metz in Alsace-Lorraine. On 7 July 1942, the unit was reactivated as the 56th Armored Infantry Regiment and assigned to the 12th Armored Division, which was activated as a division at Camp Campbell, KY on 15 September 1942. On 11 November 1943 while at Watertown, Tennessee, the 12th Armored Division was reorganized and the 56th Armored Infantry Regiment was reorganized to form the 17th, 56th and 66th Armored Infantry Battalions (AIB). The 1st Battalion of the 56th AIR became the 66th AIB and the 2nd Battalion of the 56th AIR became the 17th AIB of the 12th Armored Division. The 3rd Battalion of the 56th AIR became the 56th AIB. Companies G, H and I of the 56th AIR became Companies A, B and C of the 56th AIB. (Note: Since all of the Armored Infantry Battalions of the 12th Armored Division, the 56th, 66th and 17th Armored Infantry Battalions, trace their origins to the 56th Infantry Regiment during WWI and further, back to the 17th Infantry Regiment during the American Civil War, the heraldic shields of all three battalions display elements of their rich history. The origins from the 56th Infantry Regiment from WW I is represented by the crest of the City of Metz and the white cross pattée on a blue background seen in the battalion crests represents the 2nd Division of Gen. Sykes' V Corps to which the 17th Infantry Regiment belonged during the Civil War. The cross in the canton is surrounded by an embattled border (top of a wall), representing the 17th Infantry Regiment fighting at Fredericksburg during the Civil War when it suffered heavy casualties pinned down behind a wall at Marye's Heights. See: 56th Infantry Regiment (United States)#Coat of Arms of the 56th Infantry Regiment and derivative Armored Infantry Battalions)

The reconstituted 56th Armored Infantry Battalion saw service in the European Theatre during World War II, beginning back in the Alsace-Lorraine as an element of the 12th Armored Division fighting in 1944–1945 to liberate the same region of France from Nazi occupation as the 56th Armored Infantry Regiment had in World War I.

=== World War II ===
==== Combat chronicle ====
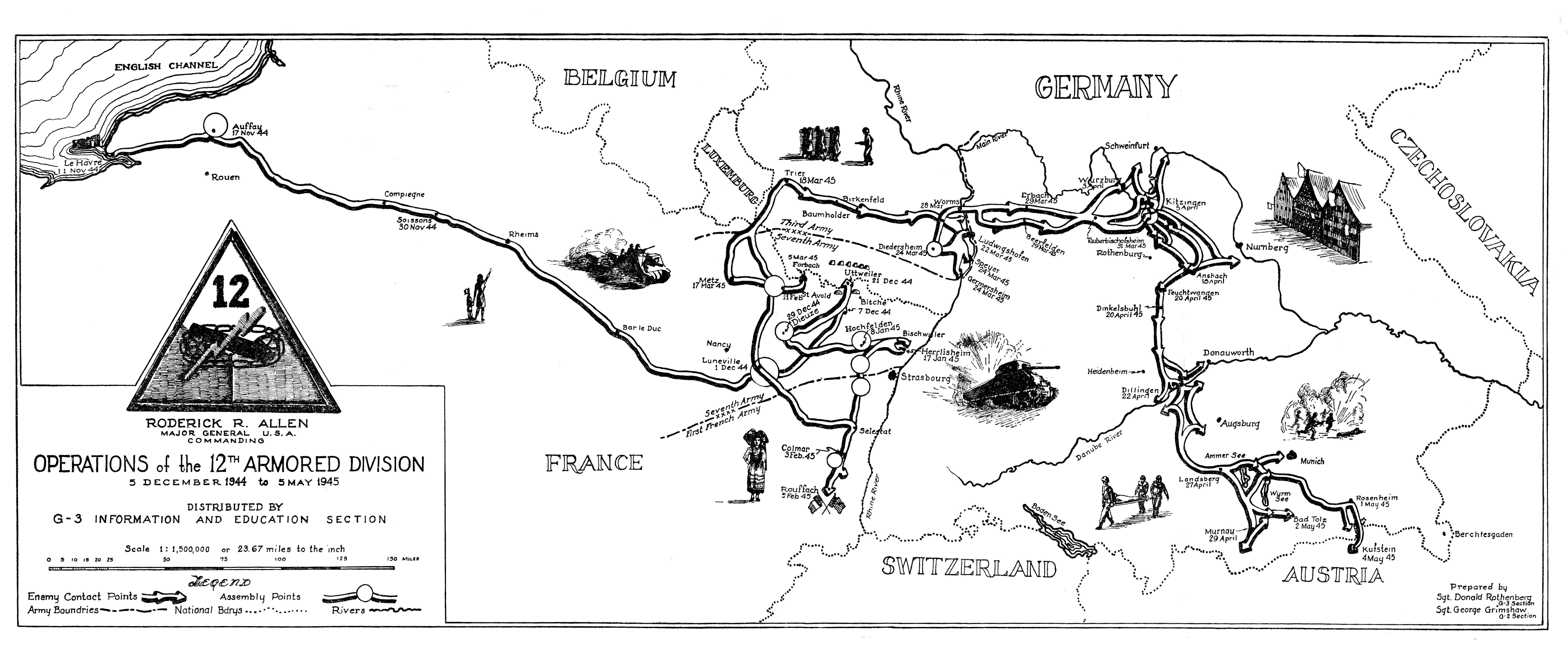
Campaign map showing the operations of the 12th Armored Division in Europe from 5 December 1944 to 5 May 1945

After completing training the division left Abilene and departed from Camp Shanks, New York, for the European Theater of Operations on 20 September 1944. It landed at Liverpool, England on 2 October 1944. While awaiting replacement armor which had been borrowed by the U.S. Third Army, the 12th was sent to Tidworth Barracks in Wiltshire, UK. It crossed the English Channel from Southampton, arrived at Le Havre, France, on 11 November 1944 and then traveled up the Seine River to Rouen to join the Seventh Army under Lieutenant General Alexander Patch. Advance elements met the enemy near Weisslingen in Alsace on 5 December, and the entire division moved against the Maginot Line fortifications two days later.

In its advance, Rohrbach-lès-Bitche and towns surrounding Bettviller were liberated by 12 December 1944, and Utweiler, Germany was seized on 21 December. After a short period of rehabilitation and maintenance, the 12th rolled against the Rhine bridgehead at Herrlisheim that the Germans had established as part of their Operation Nordwind offensive. In order to seal the Battle of the Bulge, units of the Seventh Army were diverted north to assist the Third Army in capturing Bastogne. Due to this, the remainder of the Seventh Army, including the 12th Armored Division, was stretched thin holding a 126 miles (203 km) long front line with only eight divisions.

German defenders repulsed two division attacks in the most violent combat in the history of the division, during 8 to 10 January and 16 to 17 January 1945. The division's attacks at Herrlisheim failed to use combined-arms tactics and were defeated in detail, resulting in two tank and two armored infantry battalions taking heavy losses. Poor tactics were compounded by terrain that was almost tabletop-flat, offering the German defenders excellent fields of fire. However, enemy counterattacks also failed, in part because of the firm leadership of the commander of Combat Command B, Colonel Charles Bromley, who declared his headquarters expendable and ordered all personnel in the headquarters to prepare a hasty defense. (Note: "[On 19 Jan 1945, at] about 5 p.m., 400 German infantrymen supported by 17 tanks almost succeeded in attacking across the Zorn from Landgraben River. North of Herrlisheim, the Germans pushed across the Zorn and almost overran CCB's command post in Rohrwiller. As clerks and other personnel started to panic and prepared to evacuate the area, Colonel Bromley shouted out: "Stop this goddamn panic. We're not retreating anywhere. We're defending this command post; we're holding this line. We're soldiers; we have weapons; we're expendable.")

The division was subsequently relieved by the U.S. 36th Infantry Division. The 12th Armored Division suffered over 1,700 battle casualties during the fighting in and around Herrlisheim. As a consequence, when African-American soldiers who were in non-combat positions were able to volunteer to become combat troops, Major General Roderick R. Allen was one of only ten division commanders who allowed them to join the combat ranks. After recovering from the bruising experience at Herrlisheim, the 12th went over to the offensive and attacked south from Colmar, after being assigned to the French First Army under General Jean de Lattre de Tassigny. In a lightning drive, the 12th effected junction with French forces at Rouffach, on 5 February, sealing the Colmar Pocket and ending German resistance in the Vosges Mountains. Except for elements acting as a protective screen, the division withdrew to the St. Avold area for rest and rehabilitation. The division was attached to the Third Army under General George S. Patton Jr. from 17 March 1945 through its crossing of the Rhine on 28 March. The soldiers were ordered to remove their identifying unit insignias, and vehicle markings were painted over, disguising the fact that Patton had an additional armored division under his command. Thus the 12th was given the nickname the "Mystery Division". The attack resumed on 18 March 1945.

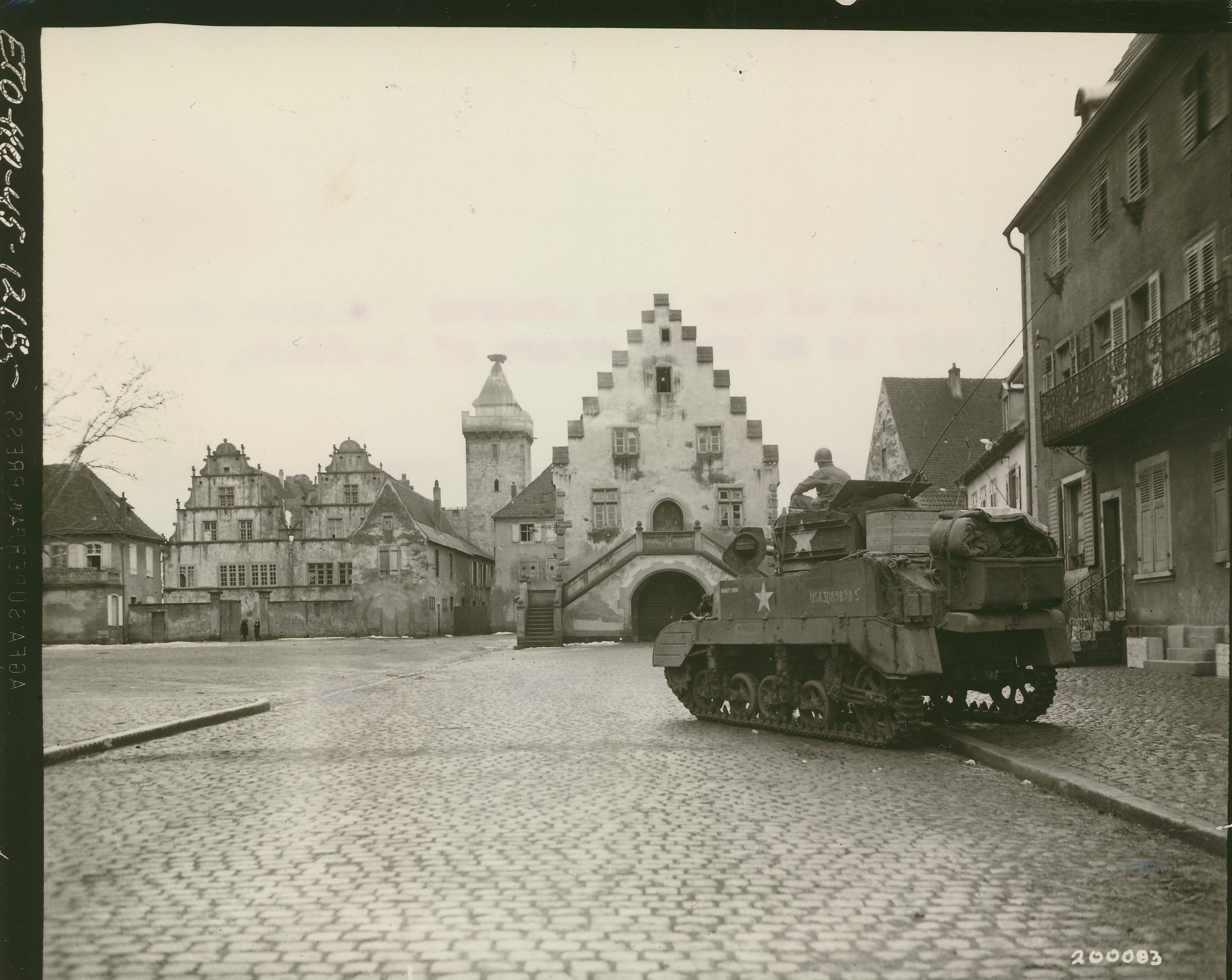
A light tank of the 12th Armored Division in Rouffach, 5 Feb. 1945

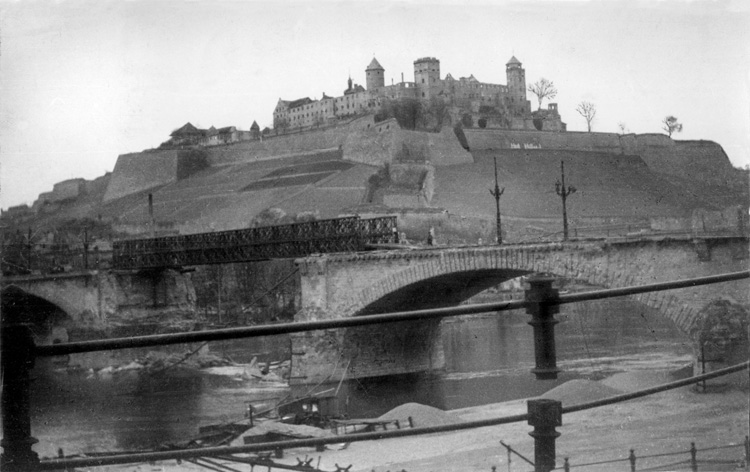
Bailey bridge built over bombed out bridge at base of Marienberg Fortress in Würzburg by the 119th Armored Engineer Battalion of the U.S 12th Armored Division, April 1945

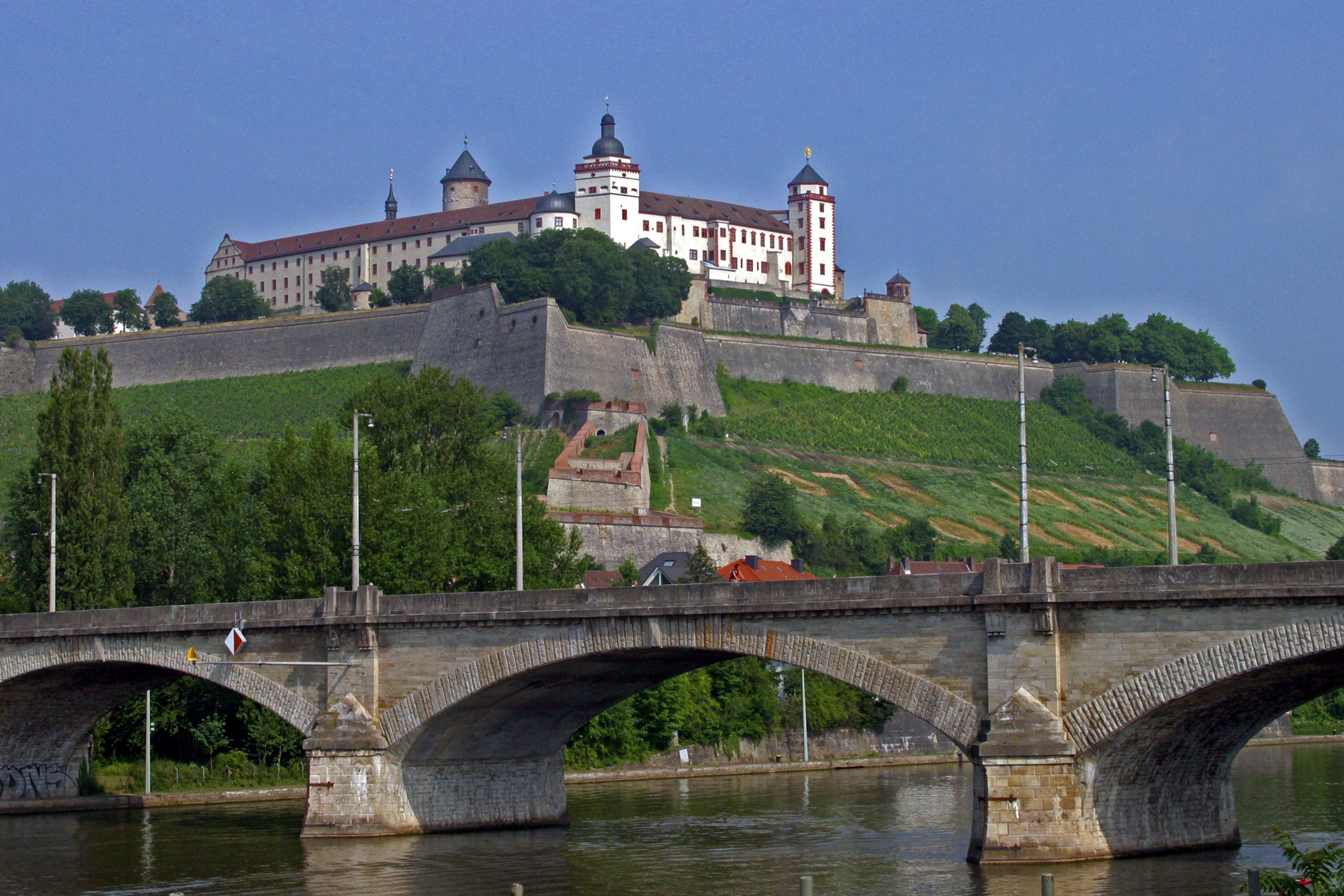
Fortress Marienberg,14 June 2003

In a quick drive to the Rhine, Ludwigshafen fell on 21 March, and two other important river cities, Speyer and Germersheim, were secured on 24 March, clearing the Saar Palatinate. Maintaining the rapid pace, the 12th crossed the Rhine River at Worms on 28 March over pontoon bridges, advanced toward Würzburg, and captured that city along with elements of the famed 42nd Infantry Division (United States). After assisting in the seizure of Schweinfurt, the division continued toward Nuremberg on 13 April, taking Neustadt, then shifted south toward Munich on 17 April. Elements of the 12th raced from Dinkelsbühl to the Danube, where they found the bridge at Lauingen had been blown. Moving quickly they captured the bridge at Dillingen intact before demolition men could destroy it. This bridge provided a vital artery for Allied troops flooding into southern Bavaria.

The division spearheaded the Seventh Army drive, securing Landsberg, on 27 April and clearing the area between the Ammer and Würm Lakes by 30 April. The 12th Armored Division is recognized as a liberating unit of the Landsberg concentration camps near the Landsberg Prison, sub-camps of Dachau concentration camp on 27 April 1945. On 29 April 1945, the 12th AD liberated Oflag VII-A Murnau, a German Army POW camp for Polish Army officers interned north of the Bavarian town of Murnau am Staffelsee during World War II. (Note: "Oflag VIIA was liberated by Troop B, 116th Cavalry Reconnaissance Squadron (MECZ), Combat Command A of the 12th Armored Division, XXI Corps of the American 7th Army, on 29 April 1945. According to 12 Armored Division records (Daily Journal) the camp was liberated at 16:55 in the afternoon. The 116th was the second squadron of the 101st Cavalry Group. Task Force 2 contained Co. A and/or B 66th Armoured (sic) Infantry, plus Co. C of the 43rd Tank Battalion and a platoon of light tanks from Co. D of the 43rd Tank Battalion.")

Elements crossed the Inn River and the Austrian border at Kufstein on 3 May. The 12th Armored Division was relieved by the 36th Infantry Division on 4 May. On 5 May, Lieutenant (later Captain) John C. Lee Jr., Co. B, 23rd Tank Battalion, organized the rescue of VIP French prisoners from an Alpine castle in Tyrol during the Battle for Castle Itter. Under Lee's command were members of the German Wehrmacht, who combined forces with 2 tanks from the 12th to fight the SS Commander and soldiers guarding the prisoners. For leading the successful rescue of these prisoners, Lee was promoted to captain and awarded the Distinguished Service Cross.

The 12th Armored Division engaged in security duty around Ulm until 22 November 1945, when it left Marseille, France, for home. Some members of the 12th attended the US Army University, in either Biarritz, France or Shrivenham, England during this time.

It was deactivated on 3 December 1945, and on 17 December 1945, its battle flags were turned in at Camp Kilmer, New Jersey.

==== POWs captured ====
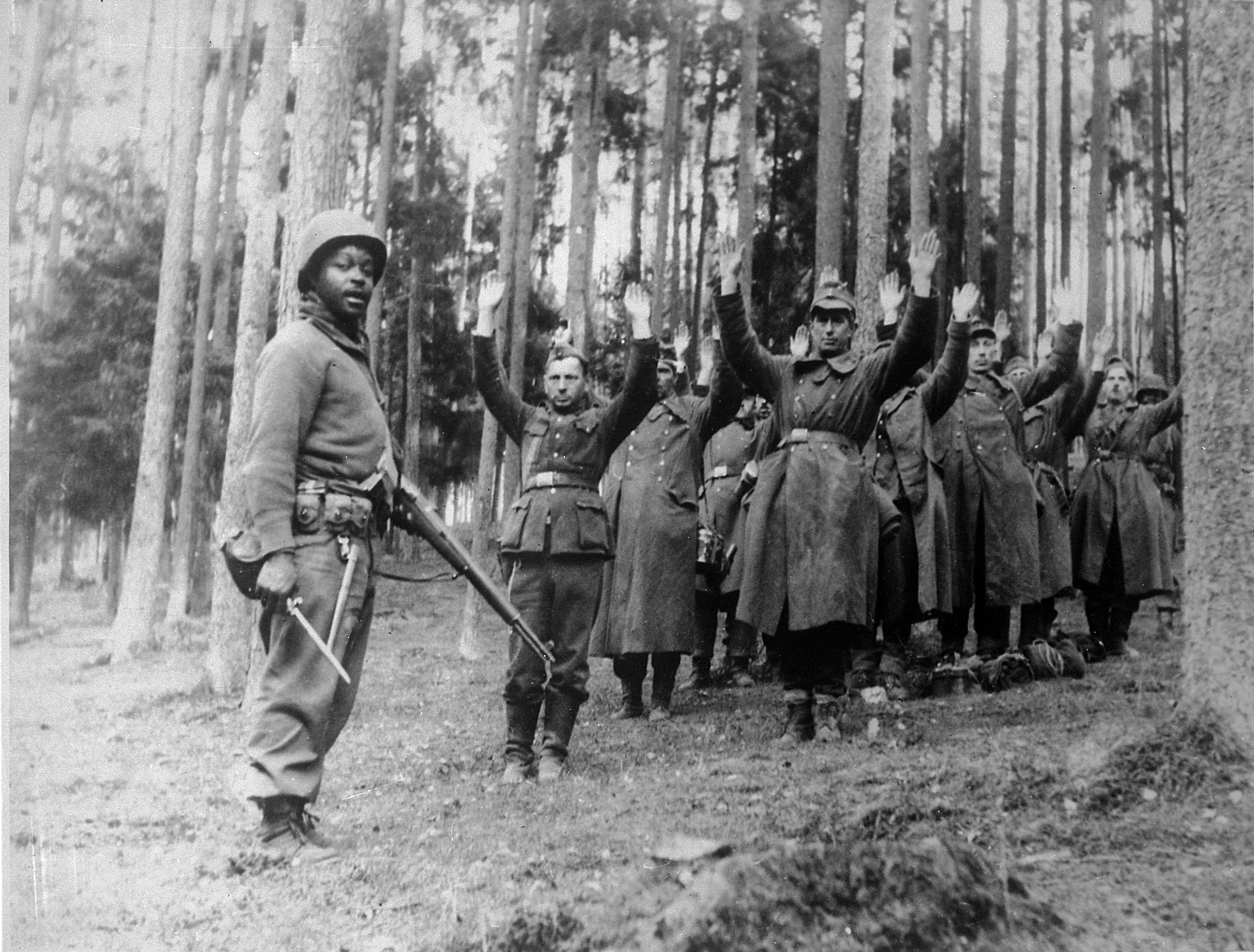
12th AD soldier with German prisoners of war, April 1945. United States National Archives, Group 208 of the Records of the Office of War Information 1926 – 1951, National Archives Identifier: 535840

During its deployment the 12th Armored Division captured 72,243 enemy prisoners of war. Among them were Adolf Eichmann and Wernher von Braun.

Nearly 8,500 Allied POWs, including 1,500 Americans, and an additional 20,000 non-military prisoners, were liberated by the 12th AD.

==== Casualties ====
Total 12th Armored Division complement: 10,937 at end of 1944; 17,000 assigned to the division between activation and deactivation

- Total battle casualties: 3,527
- Killed in action: 616
- Wounded in action: 2,416
- Missing in action: 17
- Prisoner of war: 478

==== Division organization ====
===== Heavy armored division =====
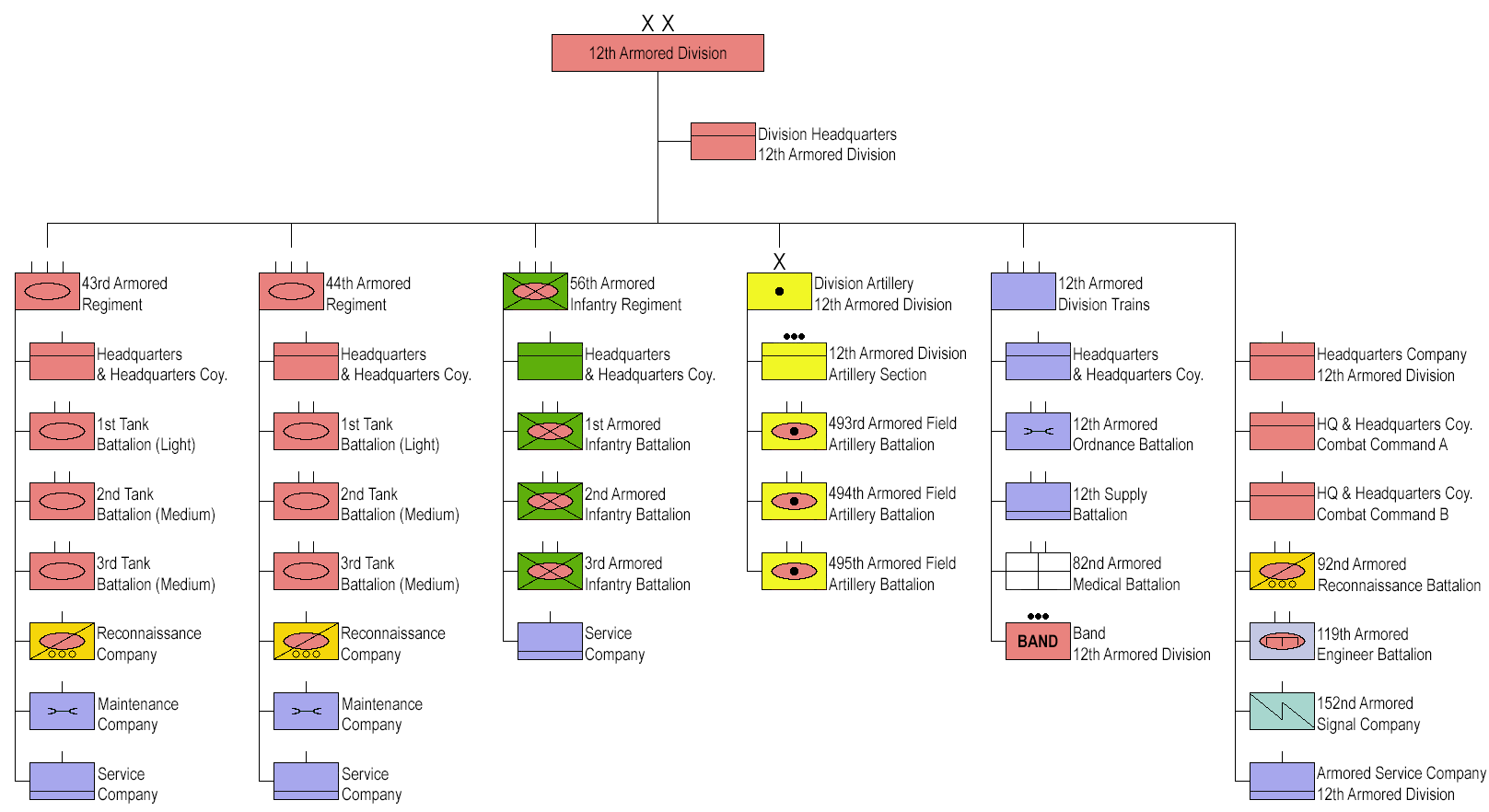
12th Armored Division organization after the division's activation (click to enlarge)

The division was activated as a heavy armored division in 1942. At the time the 12th Armored Division was composed of the following units:

- 12th Armored Division
  - Division Headquarters
  - Headquarters Company, 12th Armored Division
  - Headquarters and Headquarters Company, Combat Command A
  - Headquarters and Headquarters Company, Combat Command B
  - 152nd Armored Signal Company
  - Armored Service Company (includes the division's Military Police Platoon)
  - 43rd Armored Regiment
    - Headquarters and Headquarters Company
    - Reconnaissance Company (M3 scout cars and T30 HMC self propelled guns)
    - Maintenance Company
    - Service Company
    - 1st Tank Battalion (Light)
      - Headquarters and Headquarters Company
      - 3× Light Tank companies (A, B, C) (M3/M5 Stuart light tanks)
    - 2nd Tank Battalion (Medium)
      - Headquarters and Headquarters Company
      - 3× Medium Tank companies (D, E, F) (M4 Sherman tanks)
    - 3rd Tank Battalion (Medium)
      - Headquarters and Headquarters Company
      - 3× Medium Tank companies (G, H, I) (M4 Sherman tanks)
  - 44th Armored Regiment
    - same organization as 43rd Armored Regiment
  - 56th Armored Infantry Regiment
    - Headquarters and Headquarters Company
    - 3× Armored infantry battalions
      - each battalion consists of: 1× Headquarters and Headquarters Company, 3× Rifle companies on M3 half-tracks
    - Service Company
  - 92nd Armored Reconnaissance Battalion
    - Headquarters and Headquarters Company
    - 3× Reconnaissance companies (M3 scout cars)
    - Light Tank Company (M3/M5 Stuart light tanks)
  - 119th Armored Engineer Battalion
    - Headquarters and Headquarters Company
    - 4× Armored engineer companies
    - Bridge Company
  - 12th Armored Division Artillery
    - 12th Armored Division Artillery Section
    - 493rd Armored Field Artillery Battalion
      - Headquarters and Headquarters Battery
      - 3× Field artillery batteries (M7 Priest self propelled howitzers)
      - Service Battery
    - 494th Armored Field Artillery Battalion
      - same organization as 493rd Armored Field Artillery Battalion
    - 495th Armored Field Artillery Battalion
      - same organization as 493rd Armored Field Artillery Battalion
  - 12th Armored Division Trains
    - Headquarters and Headquarters Company
    - 14th Armored Ordnance Battalion
      - Headquarters and Headquarters Company
      - 3× Maintenance companies
    - 14th Supply Battalion
      - Headquarters and Headquarters Company
      - 2× Truck companies
    - 82nd Armored Medical Battalion
      - Headquarters and Headquarters Company
      - 3× Medical companies
    - 12th Armored Division Band

===== Light armored division =====
Early in 1943, the Army Ground Force began a series of studies to reorganize the various divisions within the Army. After reviewing the tables of organization and after allowing the various commands to review and comment on the proposed restructure, the War Department published on 15 September 1943 a new armored division tables of organization. The restructuring removed the two armored regiments and armored infantry regiment from the table of organization and replaced them with three tank battalions and three armored infantry battalions. Each tank battalion included one light and three medium tank companies. Both Combat Commands, A and B, remained, but an additional Reserve Command was added to the organization. This was a small headquarters element of 10 personnel tasked to clarify command and control in the division's rear area. Armored engineer battalions lost their bridge companies, while their engineer companies were reduced from four to three. The division's cavalry reconnaissance squadron was increased in size to include an HQ Troop, four reconnaissance troops, a light tank company, and an assault gun troop of four platoons (one for each reconnaissance troop). Within the division trains, the division lost its supply battalion and the division's armored service company. These changes pared the division's strength from 14,630 men to 10,937, slashed the number of tanks from 360 to 263, reduced the variety of vehicles to ease repair problems, and eliminated the maintenance-prone motorcycles.

After its reorganization as a light armored division the 12th Armored Division was composed of the following units:

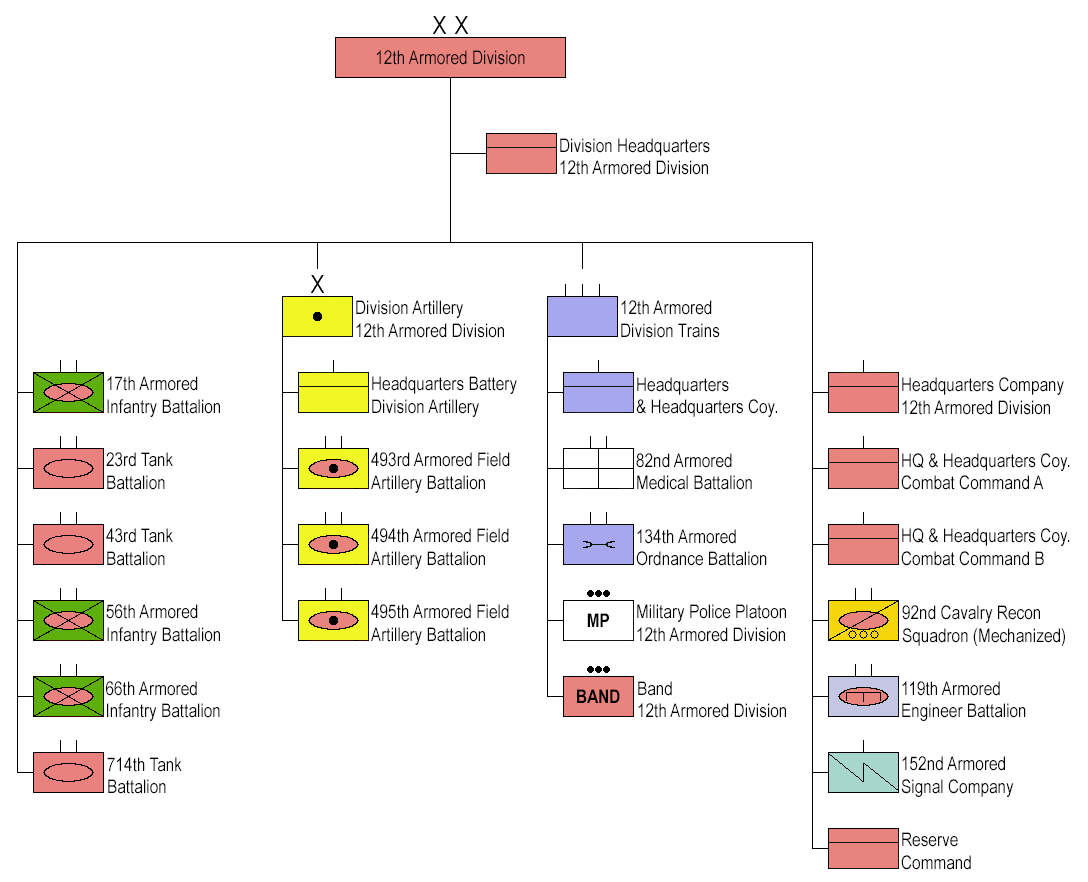
12th Armored Division organization after the division's reorganization (click to enlarge)

- 12th Armored Division
  - Division Headquarters
  - Headquarters Company, 12th Armored Division
  - Headquarters and Headquarters Company, Combat Command A
  - Headquarters and Headquarters Company, Combat Command B
  - 152nd Armored Signal Company
  - Reserve Command
  - 23rd Tank Battalion
    - Headquarters and Headquarters Company
    - 3× Medium Tank companies (M4 Sherman tanks)
    - Light Tank Company (M3/M5 Stuart or M24 Chaffee light tanks)
    - Service Company
  - 43rd Tank Battalion
    - same organization as 23rd Tank Battalion
  - 44th Tank Battalion (sent to the Pacific and replaced by the 714th Tank Battalion)
    - same organization as 23rd Tank Battalion
  - 714th Tank Battalion
    - same organization as 23rd Tank Battalion
  - 17th Armored Infantry Battalion
    - Headquarters and Headquarters Company
    - 3× Rifle companies (M3 half-tracks)
    - Service Company
  - 56th Armored Infantry Battalion
    - same organization as 17th Armored Infantry Battalion
  - 66th Armored Infantry Battalion
    - same organization as 17th Armored Infantry Battalion
  - 92nd Cavalry Reconnaissance Squadron (Mechanized)
    - Headquarters and Headquarters and Service Troop
    - 4× Cavalry reconnaissance troops (M8 Greyhound armored cars)
    - Cavalry Assault Gun Troop (M8 Scott self propelled guns)
    - Light Tank Company (M3/M5 Stuart or M24 Chaffee light tanks)
  - 119th Armored Engineer Battalion
    - Headquarters and Headquarters Company
    - 3× Armored engineer companies
  - 12th Armored Division Artillery
    - Headquarters and Headquarters Battery
    - 493rd Armored Field Artillery Battalion
      - Headquarters and Headquarters Battery
      - 3× Field artillery batteries (M7 Priest self propelled howitzers)
      - Service Battery
    - 494th Armored Field Artillery Battalion
      - same organization as 493rd Armored Field Artillery Battalion
    - 495th Armored Field Artillery Battalion
      - same organization as 493rd Armored Field Artillery Battalion
  - 12th Armored Division Trains
    - Headquarters and Headquarters Company
    - 82nd Armored Medical Battalion
      - Headquarters and Headquarters Company
      - 3× Medical companies
    - 134th Armored Ordnance Battalion
      - Headquarters and Headquarters Company
      - 3× Maintenance companies
    - Military Police Platoon
    - 12th Armored Division Band

==== Awards ====
- Campaigns: Rhineland, Ardennes-Alsace, Central Europe.
- Days of combat: 102
- Distinguished Unit Citations: 1 - 92nd Cavalry Reconnaissance Squadron, Mechanized
- Meritorious Unit Citation: 3, to the 134th Ordnance Maintenance Battalion (with a star in addition); 82d Armored Medical Battalion; and 152d Armored Signal Company
- Division authorized by France to incorporate Arms of the City of Colmar in its division insignia for action in liberating the city.

Individual awards:

- Medal of Honor: 1 - Edward A. Carter Jr.
- Distinguished Service Cross: 6
- Silver Star: 198
- Legion of Merit: 4
- Distinguished Flying Cross: 3
- Soldier's Medal: 12
- Bronze Star Medal: 1,199 (does not include Bronze Stars issued to awardees of Combat Infantry Badges or Combat Medical Badges)
- Air Medal: 50

==== Commanders ====
- Major General Carlos Brewer (September 1942 – August 1944)
- Major General Douglass T. Greene (August–September 1944)
- Major General Roderick R. Allen (September 1944 – July 1945)
- Brigadier General Willard Ames Holbrook Jr. (July 1945 to inactivation)

==== Assignments in the European Theater of Operations ====
- 13 November 1944: Ninth Army, Twelfth Army Group
- 5 December 1944: XV Corps, Seventh Army, Sixth Army Group.
- 27 December 1944: XXI Corps.
- 30 December 1944: Seventh Army, 6th Army Group.
- 3 January 1945: XV Corps.
- 6 January 1945: VI Corps.
- 3 February 1945: XXI Corps.
- 11 February 1945: XV Corps.
- 28 February 1945: XXI Corps.
- 17 March 1945: Seventh Army, 6th Army Group, but attached to the XX Corps, Third Army, Twelfth Army Group.
- 24 March 1945: XXI Corps, Seventh Army, 6th Army Group.
- 26 March 1945: XV Corps.
- 31 March 1945: XXI Corps.
- 4 May 1945: Seventh Army, 6th Army Group.

==== Assignments of the 12th AD to Higher Commands ====
Date Assigned to Corps Assigned to Army Attached to Army Assigned to Army Group Attached to Army Group

- 07.10.1944 UK Base ETOUSA
- 13.11.1944 Ninth Army 12th Army Group
- 05.12.1944 XV Operations Seventh Army 6th Army Group
- 27.12.1944 XXI Operations Seventh Army 6th Army Group
- 30.12.1944 Seventh Army 6th Army Group
- 03.01.1945 XV Corps Seventh Army 6th Army Group
- 06.01.1945 VI Corps Seventh Army 6th Army Group
- 03.02.1945 XXI Corps Seventh Army 6th Army Group
- 11.02.1945 XV Corps Seventh Army 6th Army Group
- 28.02.1945 XXI Corps Seventh Army 6th Army Group
- 17.03.1945 XX Operations Third Army,6th Army Gp 12th Army Group
- 24.03.1945 XXI Corps Seventh Army 6th Army Group
- 26.03.1945 XV Corps Seventh Army 6th Army Group
- 31.03.1945 XXI Corps Seventh Army 6th Army Group
- 04.05.1945 Seventh Army 6th Army Group

==== Detachments of units of the 12th Armored Division to other Commands ====
| Unit | Attached to | From date (dd.mm.yyyy) | To date (dd.mm.yyyy) |
|---|---|---|---|
| 92nd Cavalry Reconnaissance Squadron | Normandy Base Section | 18.11.1944 | 30.11.1944 |
| 119th Engineer Battalion, C Company | Normandy Base Section | 18.11.1944 | 30.11.1944 |
| 493rd Armored FA Battalion, C Battery | Normandy Base Section | 18.11.1944 | 30.11.1944 |
| 493rd Armored FA Battalion | 44th Infantry Division | 05.12.1944 | 07.12.1944 |
| 494th Armored FA Battalion | 44th Infantry Division | 05.12.1944 | 07.12.1944 |
| 495th Armored FA Battalion | 100th Infantry Division | 05.12.1944 | 07.12.1944 |
| 43rd Tank Battalion, A Company | 103rd Infantry Division | 05.12.1944 | 07.01.1945 |
| 493rd Armored FA Battalion | 106th Cavalry Group | 23.12.1944 | 02.01.1945 |
| 495th Armored FA Battalion | 103rd Infantry Division | 26.12.1944 | 02.01.1945 |
| 494th Armored FA Battalion | 44th Infantry Division | 26.12.1944 | 06.01.1945 |
| 23rd Tank Battalion, A Company | 100th Infantry Division | 01.01.1945 | 07.01.1945 |
| 495th Armored FA Battalion | 100th Infantry Division | 02.01.1945 | 06.01.1945 |
| 493rd Armored FA Battalion | 44th Infantry Division | 02.01.1945 | 06.01.1945 |
| 493rd Armored FA Battalion | 79th Infantry Division | 07.01.1945 | 14.01.1945 |
| CC B | 79th Infantry Division | 07.01.1945 | 15.01.1945 |
| 495th Armored FA Battalion | 3rd Algerian Infantry Division | 15.01.1945 | 16.01.1945 |
| 49th Armored FA Battalion | 36th Infantry Division | 20.01.1945 | 23.01.1945 |
| 493rd Armored FA Battalion | 36th Infantry Division | 20.01.1945 | 23.01.1945 |
| 494th Armored FA Battalion | 36th Infantry Division | 21.01.1945 | 23.01.1945 |
| 493rd Armored FA Battalion | 3rd Algerian Infantry Division | 23.01.1945 | 02.02.1945 |
| 494th Armored FA Battalion | 3rd Algerian Infantry Division | 24.01.1945 | 02.02.1945 |
| 495th Armored FA Battalion | 3rd Algerian Infantry Division | 24.01.1945 | 02.02.1945 |
| 493rd Armored FA Battalion | 117th Cavalry Reconnaissance Squadron | 02.02.1945 | (Note: Date missing from unit records) |
| 494th Armored FA Battalion | 28th Infantry Division | 04.02.1945 | 09.02.1945 |
| 495th Armored FA Battalion | 28th Infantry Division | 07.02.1945 | 10.02.1945 |
| 494th Armored FA Battalion | 70th Infantry Division | 10.02.1945 | 13.02.1945 |
| 493rd Armored FA Battalion | 44th Infantry Division | 10.02.1945 | 16.02.1945 |
| 495th Armored FA Battalion | 70th Infantry Division | 11.02.1945 | 12.02.1945 |
| 714th Tank Battalion | 70th Infantry Division | 12.02.1945 | 17.02.1945 |
| 495th Armored FA Battalion | 44th Infantry Division | 13.02.1945 | 16.02.1945 |
| 494th Armored FA Battalion | 44th Infantry Division | 14.02.1945 | 16.02.1945 |
| 494th Armored FA Battalion | 70th Infantry Division | 17.02.1945 | 09.03.1945 |
| 495th Armored FA Battalion | 70th Infantry Division | 17.02.1945 | 9.03.1945 |
| CC A | 70th Infantry Division | 02.03.1945 | 08.03.1945 |
| CC R | 101st Cavalry Group | 02.03.1945 | 08.03.1945 |
| 43rd Tank Battalion, C Company | 63rd Infantry Division | 09.03.1945 | 14.03.1945 |
| 493rd Armored FA Battalion | 70th Infantry Division | 13.03.1945 | 17.03.1945 |
| 494th Armored FA Battalion | 70th Infantry Division | 13.03.1945 | 17.03.1945 |
| 495th Armored FA Battalion | 70th Infantry Division | 13.03.1945 | 17.03.1945 |
| 92nd Cavalry Reconnaissance Squadron | 63rd Infantry Division | 5.03.1945 | 16.03.1945 |
| CC A | 94th Infantry Division | 22.03.1945 | 22.03.1945 |
| CC A | 42nd Infantry Division | 07.04.1945 | 13.04.1945 |

==== Attachments (Units officially attached to the 12th Armored Division) ====
- 572nd Anti-aircraft Artillery (AAA) AW (automatic weapons) Battalion (SP) (self-propelled) 04.12.1944-18.05.1945
- CC V, 2nd French Armored Division 30.04.1945-04.05.1945
- 101st Cavalry Group 08.04.1945-04.05.1945
- 42nd Reconnaissance Troop, 42nd Infantry Division 13.04.1945-14.04.1945
- 99th Chemical Mortar Battalion, A Company, 07.03.1945-08.03.1945
- 206th Engineer Combat Battalion 18.03.1945-20.03.1945
- 256th Engineer Combat Battalion 14.04.1945-21.04.1945
- 290th Engineer Combat Battalion 21.04.1945-04.05.1945
- 204th Field Artillery Group 18.03.1945-22.03.1945
- 342nd Field Artillery Battalion 28.03.1945-04.05.1945
- 933rd Field Artillery Battalion (155mm Howitzer) 31.03.1945-19.04.1945
- 36th Field Artillery Group, Headquarters 01.04.1945-19.04.1945
- 937th Field Artillery Battalion (155mm Howitzer) 01.04.1945-04.05.1945
- 935th Field Artillery Battalion (4.5 inch Gun) 11.04.1945-19.04.1945
- 977th Field Artillery Battalion, A Batt (155mm Gun) 24.04.1945-25.04.1945
- 1st & 2nd Bn, 22nd Infantry Reg, 4th Infantry Division 02.04.1945-03.04.1945
- 3rd Bn, 222nd Infantry Reg, 42nd Infantry Division 02.04.1945-08.04.1945
- 2nd Bn, 242nd Infantry Reg, 42nd Infantry Division 05.04.1945-07.04.1945
- G Co, 242nd Infantry Reg, 42nd Infantry Division 10.04.1945-12.04.1945
- 3rd Bn, 242nd Infantry Reg, 42nd Infantry Division 12.04.1945-14.04.1945
- 15th CT, 3rd Infantry Division 24.04.1945-25.04.1945
- 827th Tank Destroyer Battalion 19.12.1944-13.02.1945

=== Memorials Recognizing the 12th Armored Division ===
- 12th Armored Division Fort Campbell Memorial, Fort Campbell, Kentucky
- 12th Armored Division Camp Barkeley Memorial, Abilene, Texas
- 12th Armored Division Memorial Museum, Abilene, Texas
- All Veterans Memorial, 12th AD Plaque, Emporia, Kansas
- Armored Park Memorial, Fort Knox, Kentucky
- Armed Forces Monument, Arlington, Virginia
- Don F. Pratt Memorial Museum, Fort Campbell, KY
- United States Holocaust Museum, Washington, DC
- 50th Anniversary of World War II Memorial, Herrlisheim, France (12th AD is the only Allied Military Unit recognized on the Monument)
- Memorial to Liberation of France and Victory in World War II, Colmar, France
- Place de Col. Meigs plaque, Rohrbach, France
- US Memorial on Hill 351 (Mont de Sigolsheim), Sigolsheim, France

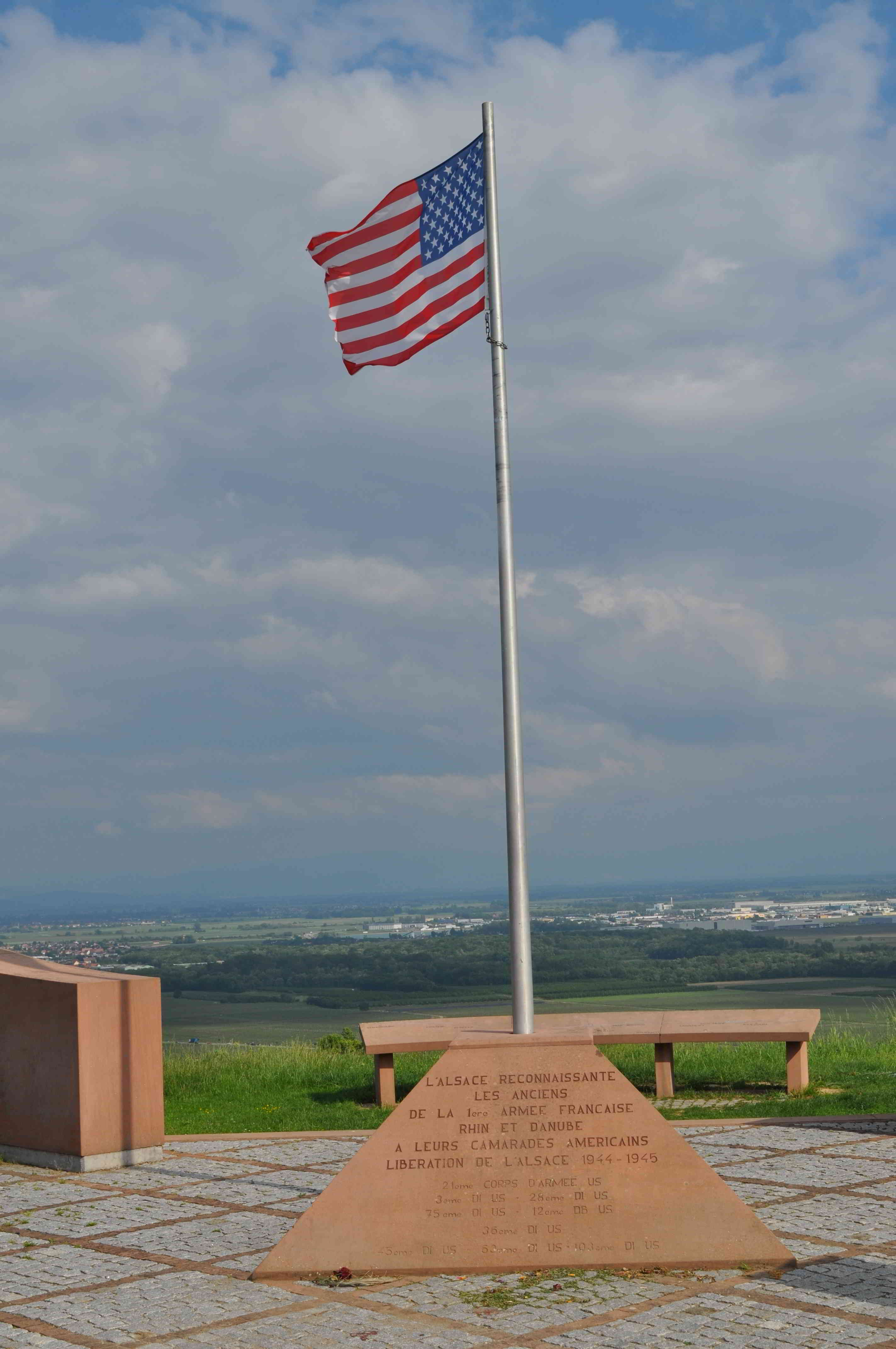
Monument at the top of Mont de Sigolsheim honors the American soldiers who fought for the liberation of Alsace at the site of the Battle of Sigolsheim in Dec. 1944.

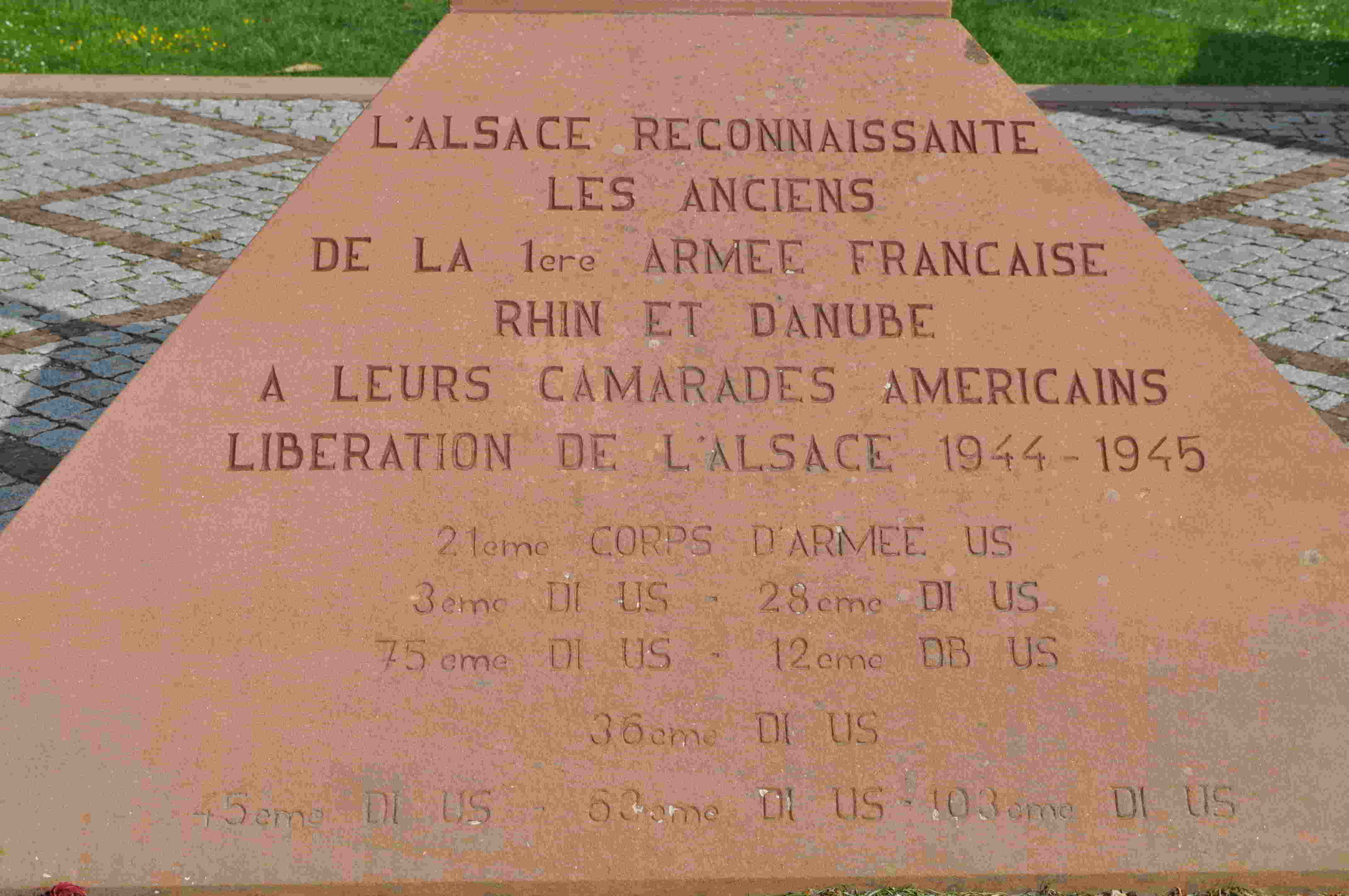
In Appreciation (by the people of) Alsace to the 1st French Army of the Rhine and Danube and their American Comrades (who) liberated Alsace 1944–1945. The U.S. 21st Army Corps, U.S. 12th Armored Division, the U.S. 3rd, 28th, 75th, 36th, 45th, 63rd, 103rd Infantry Divisions.

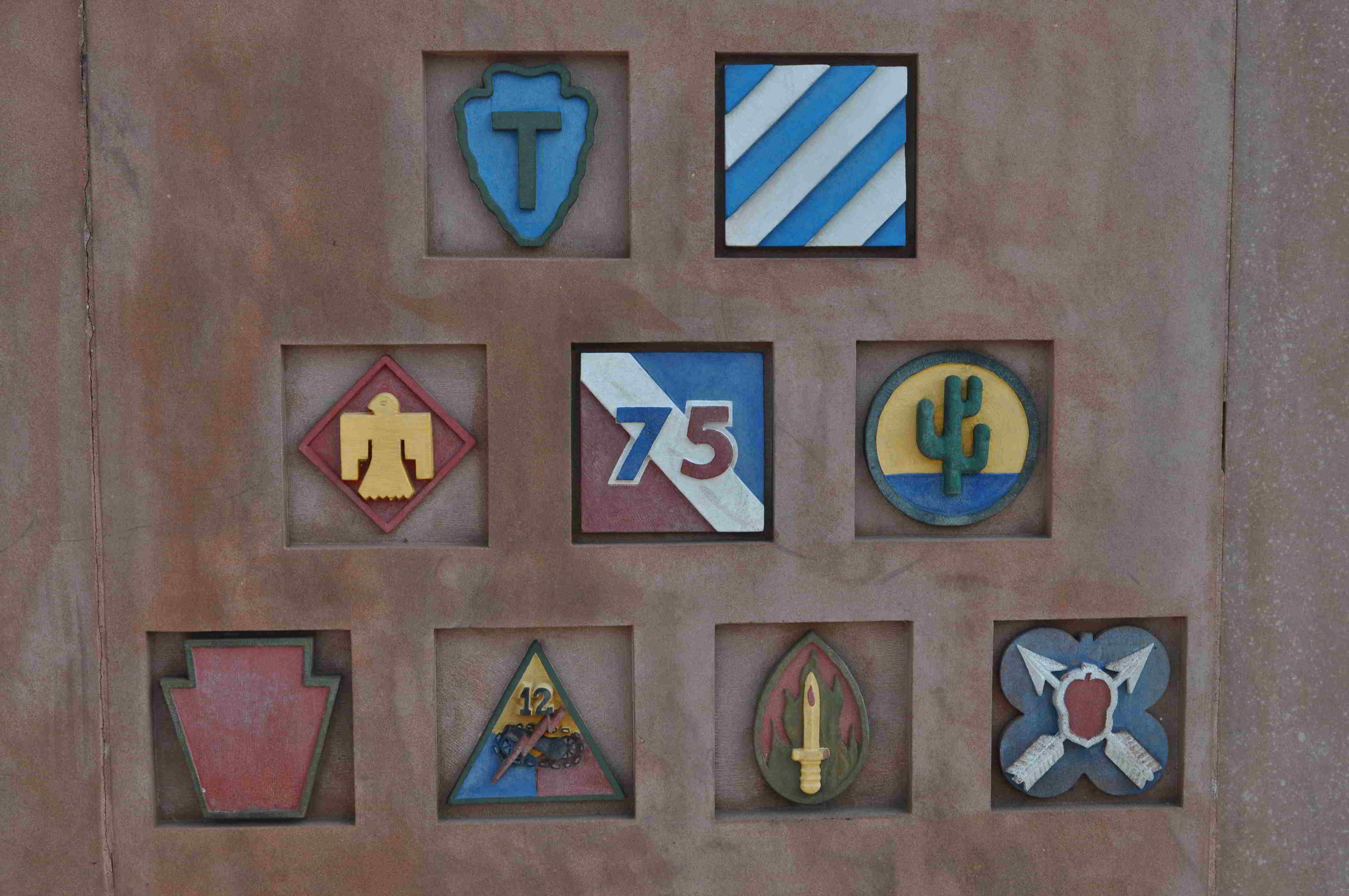
The insignias of the U.S. Divisions that fought in Alsace are emblazoned on the Sigolsheim monument: the U.S. 21st Army Corps, U.S. 12th Armored Division (bottom row, 2nd from left), the U.S. 3rd, 28th, 75th, 36th, 45th, 63rd, 103rd Infantry Divisions.

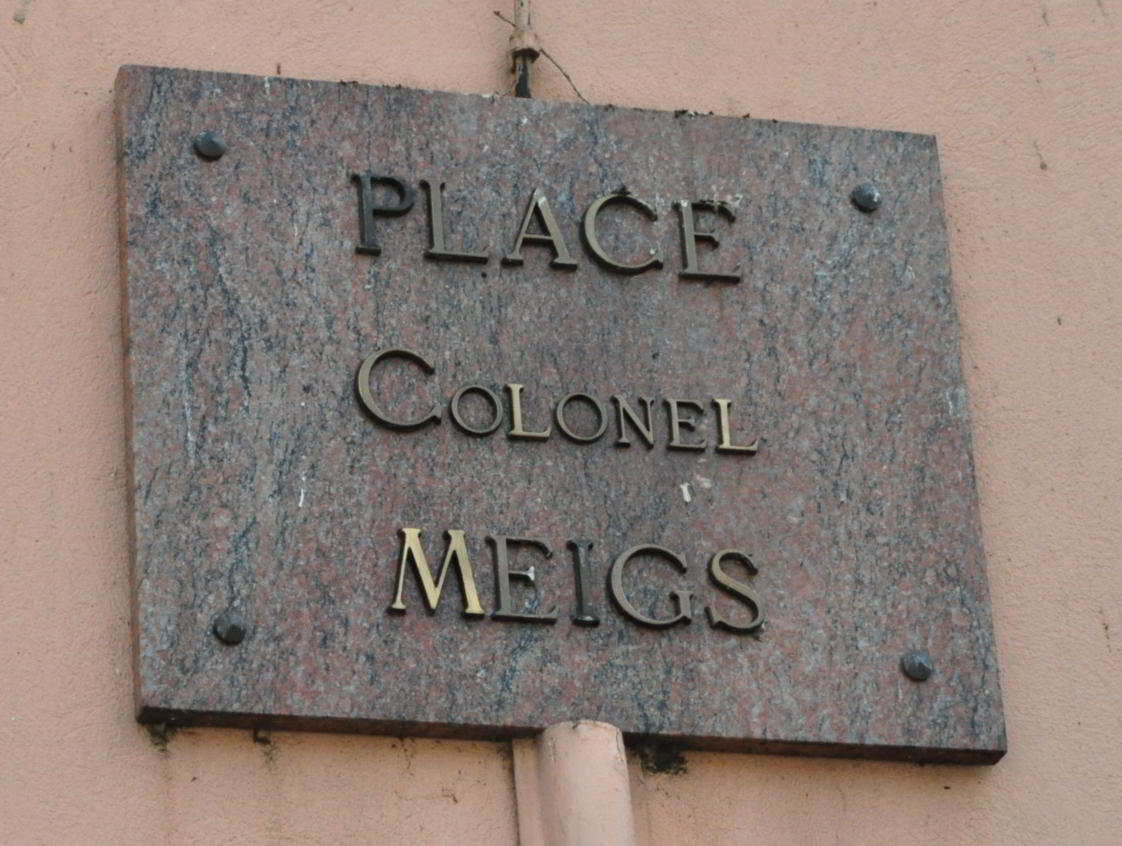
Place Colonel Meigs is located in Rohrbach, France near where Lt. Col. Montgomery C. Meigs died while commanding the 23rd Tank Bn, 12th AD. He was posthumously awarded the Silver Star.

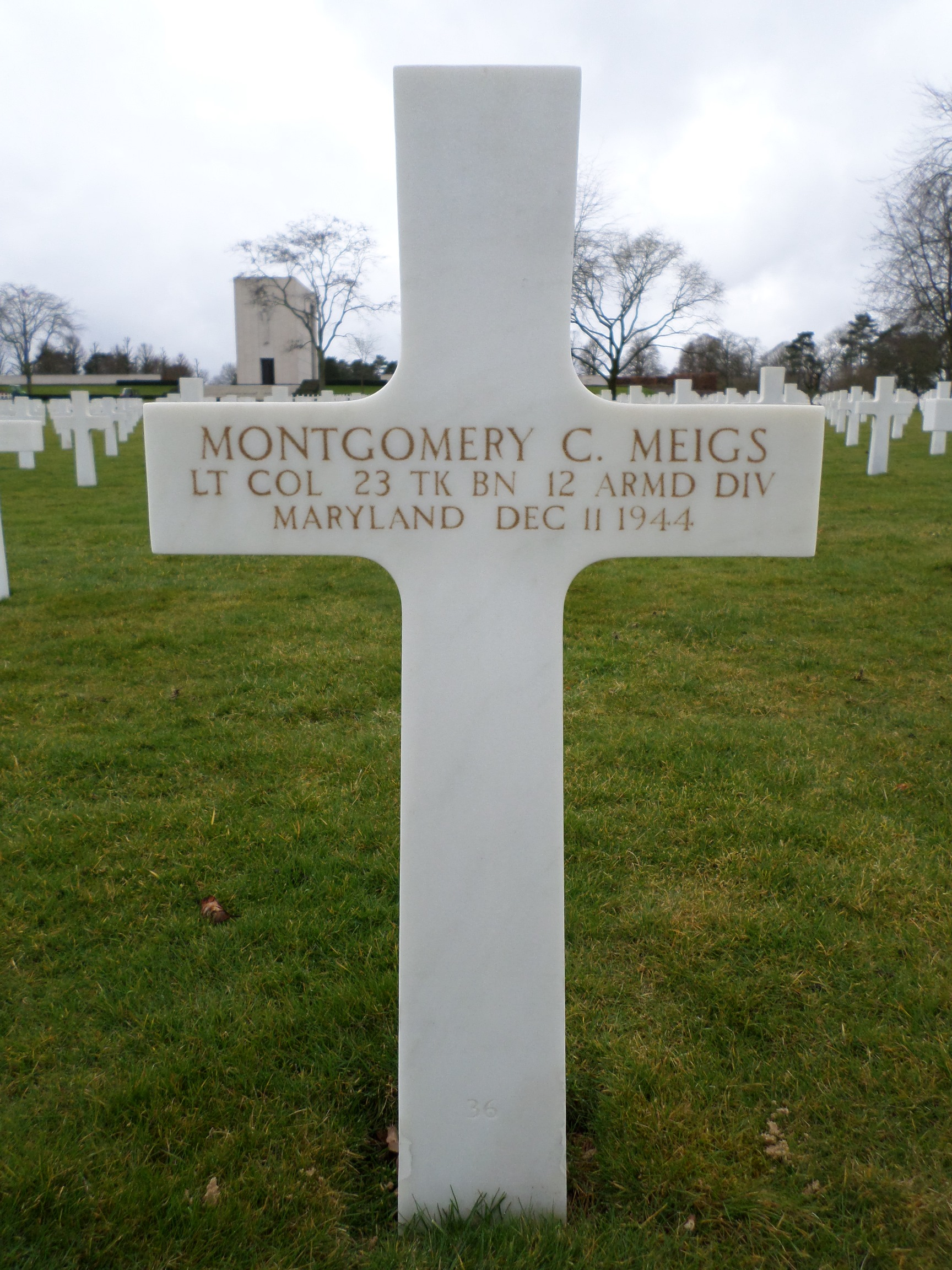
Grave marker of Lt. Col Meigs, commander of the 23rd Tank Bn., 12th AD, Lorraine American Cemetery, Saint-Avold, Departement de la Moselle, Lorraine, France. Photo courtesy of Command Sergeant Major Dwight "Andy" Anderson (ret), American Battle Monuments Commission.

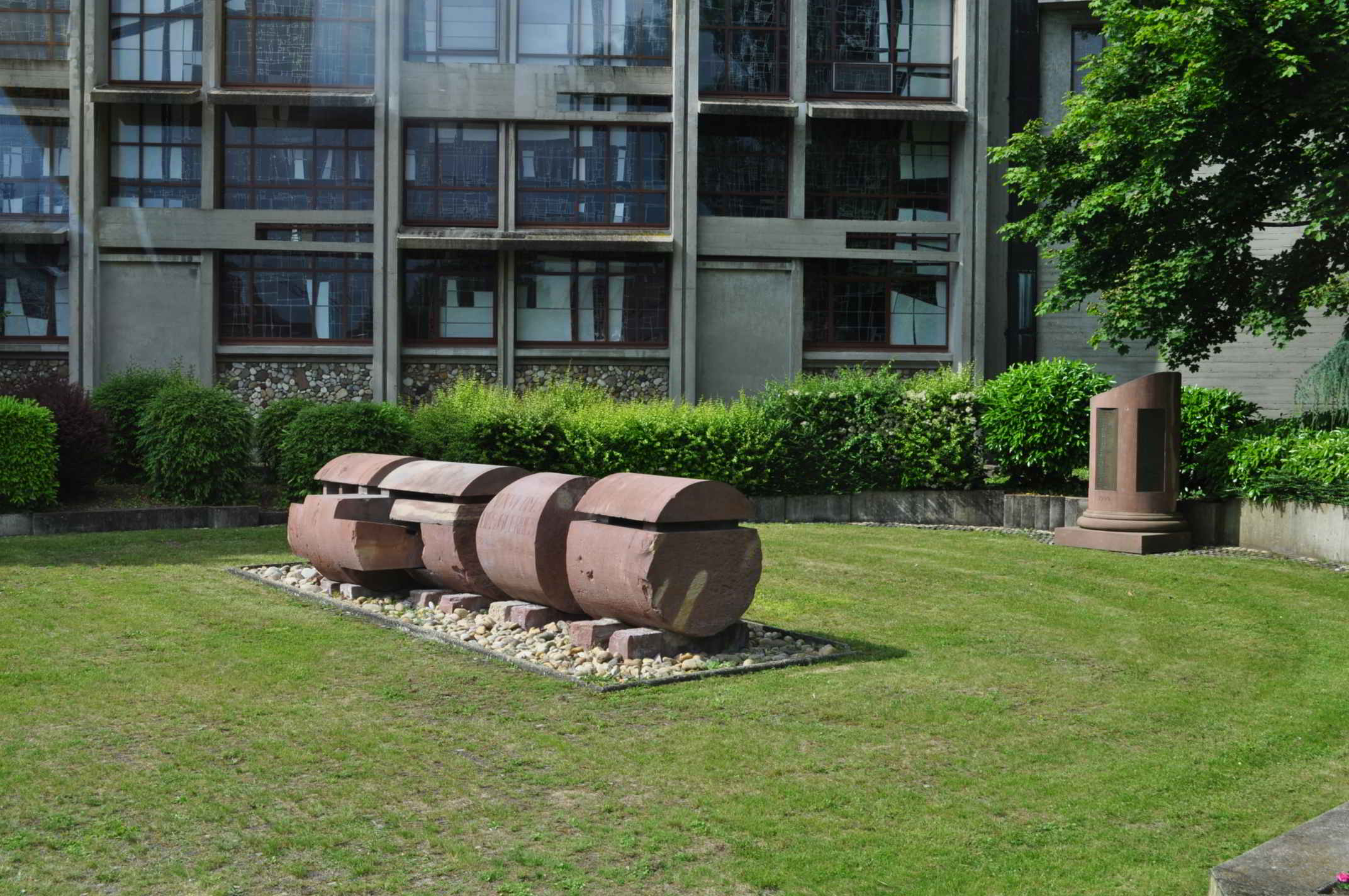
50th Anniversary of World War II Memorial, Herrlisheim, France

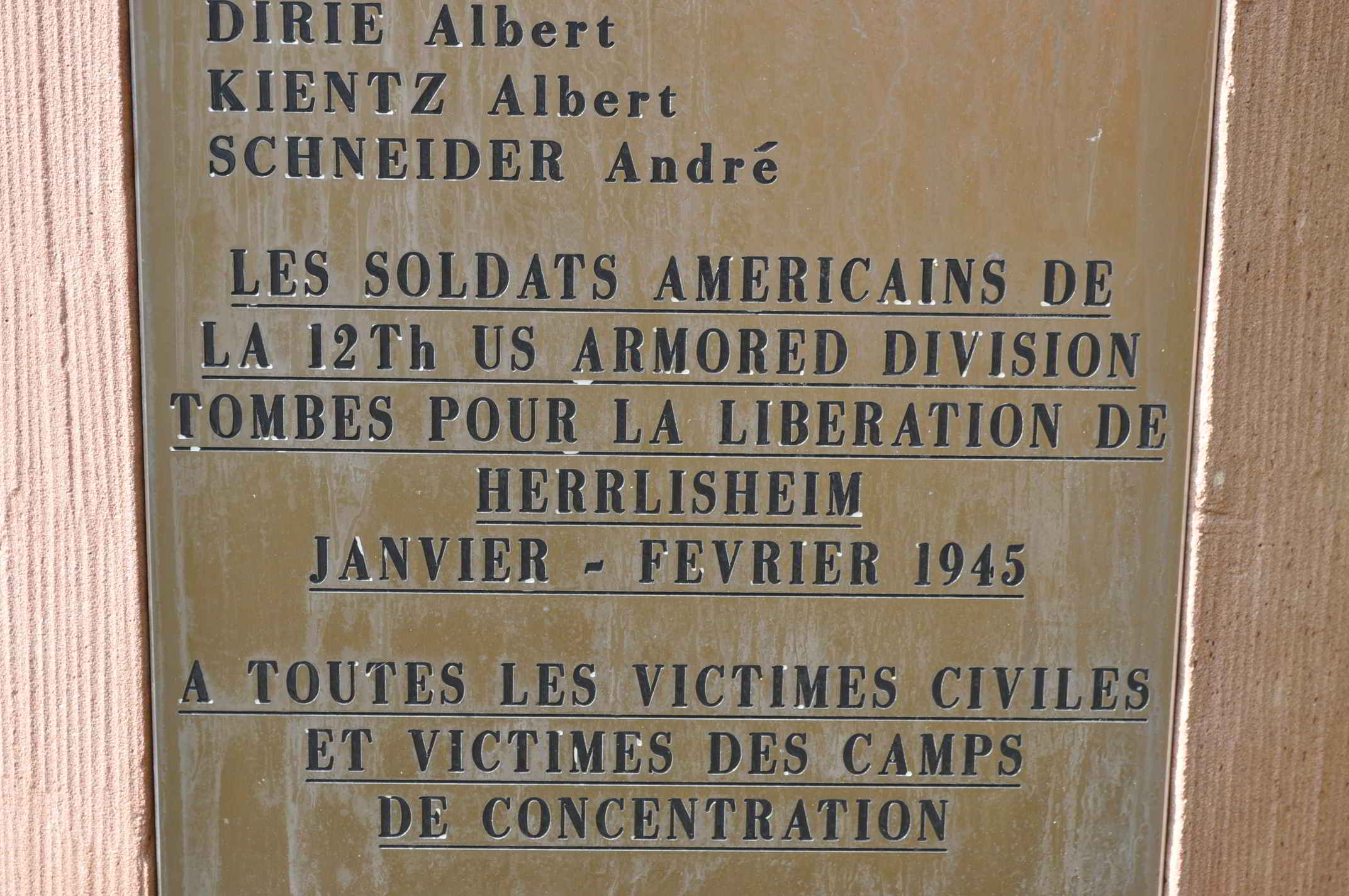
Plaque on the 50th Anniversary of World War II Memorial, Herrlisheim, France

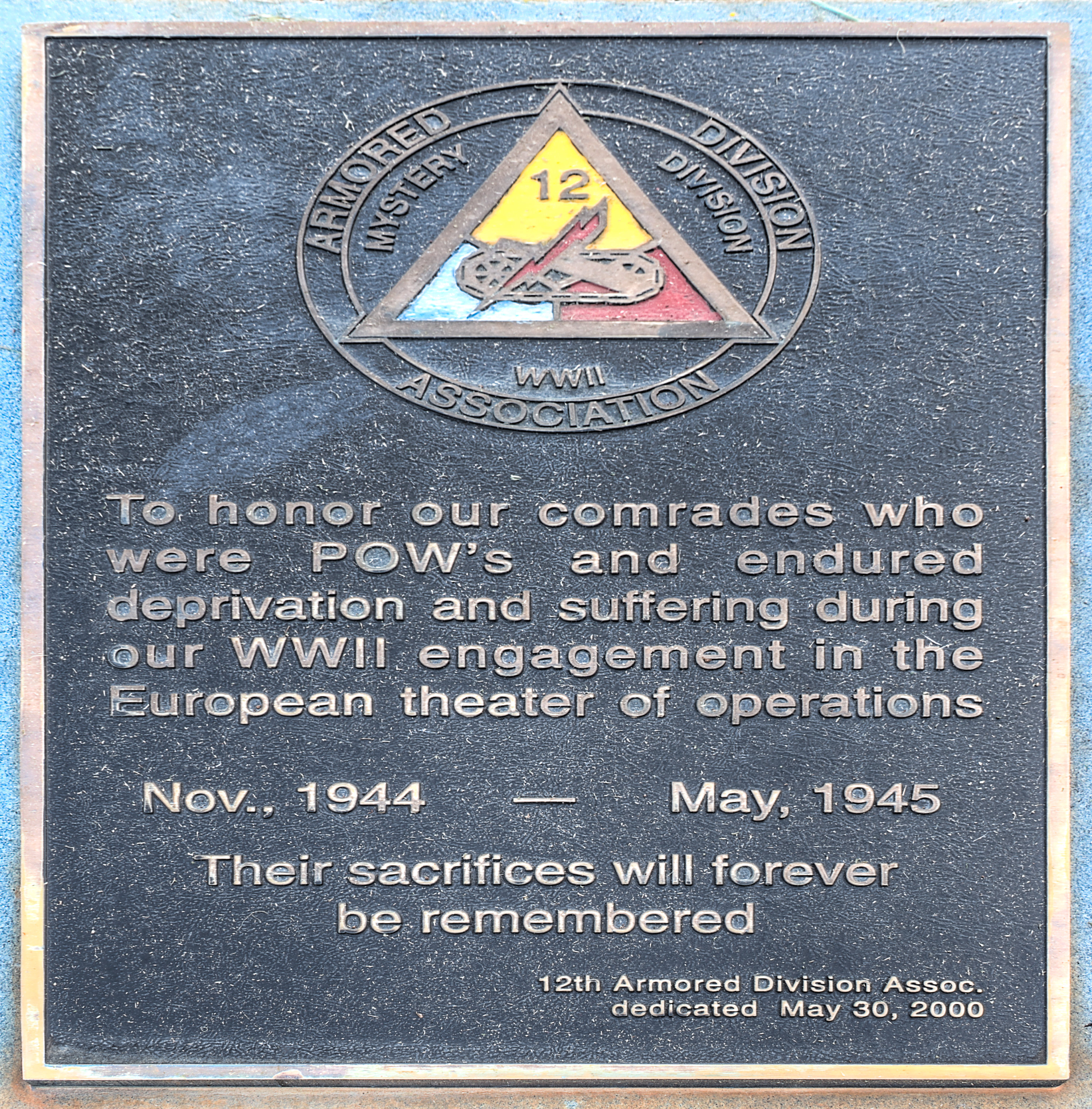
Memorial at Andersonville National Historic Site

== 12th Armored Division Association ==
The 12th Armored Division Association was founded on 15 September 1945 at Heidenheim, Germany, on the occasion of the third anniversary of the division's activation. Website: https://sites.google.com/view/12tharmoreddivisionassociation

=== The Hellcat News (newspaper) ===
The Hellcat News, the newspaper of the 12th Armored Division, was first published in 1942 as an information sheet. Initial publication was part of the public relations duties of the Special Services unit of the 12th Armored Division while the division trained at Camp (later Fort) Campbell, Kentucky. In 1943, after the division was transferred to Camp Barkeley in Abilene, Texas, the division commander, Major General Carlos Brewer, assigned three men to Special Services to continue the newspaper. The first official issue of the newspaper was published at Camp Campbell, Kentucky, although the byline reads "Somewhere in Tennessee". This was because Camp Campbell was in the Tennessee Maneuver Area located on the Kentucky-Tennessee border between Hopkinsville, Kentucky, and Clarksville, Tennessee. Due to its close proximity to Clarksville, Tennessee, the War Department on 6 March 1942, designated Tennessee as the official address of the new camp. This caused a great deal of confusion, since the Headquarters was in Tennessee and the post office was in Kentucky. After many months of mail delivery problems, Colonel Guy W. Chipman requested that the address be changed to Camp Campbell, Kentucky. The U.S. War Department officially changed the address on 23 September 1942.

The newspaper continued to be published by the division Special Services after transfer of the division to Camp Barkeley in Abilene, Texas, from February 1944 through the final issue published in the U.S during the war on 10 August 1944 (Vol. 2, No. 26), when the entire division was shipped to Europe to join the 7th Army in France. Publication resumed with Volume 3, Issue 1 on 18 May 1945, in Heidenheim, Germany, following cessation of combat operations in the ETO. The Special Services of the division published the first issues in Europe on a weekly basis when conditions permitted, until the deactivation of the division in 1946. The Hellcat News is one of two U.S. military newspapers that has been continuously published since World War 2, the other being the older "Stars and "Stripes", which began publication on 9 November 1861 in Bloomfield, Missouri. The "Hellcat News" is the oldest U.S. Armed Forces divisional newspaper still being published since World War 2.

==== Content ====
Wartime publications contained division news stories, cartoons and photographs. The later editions of the 12th Armored Association contain information about former members of the division, organizational news including information about the yearly reunion, original cartoons, and photographs both from the war years and afterwards. A series relating the history of the division is also recounted in the newspaper. In addition, the president of the association and the secretary included messages of interest in most issues. These messages contain information about the division's Medal of Honor recipient, Staff Sergeant Edward A. Carter Jr. The Hellcat News is published by the 12th Armored Division Association. Archived copies of the Hellcat News from the first issue in 1943 through 2012 are available online through the West Texas Digital Archive.

== 12th Armored Division Memorial Museum ==
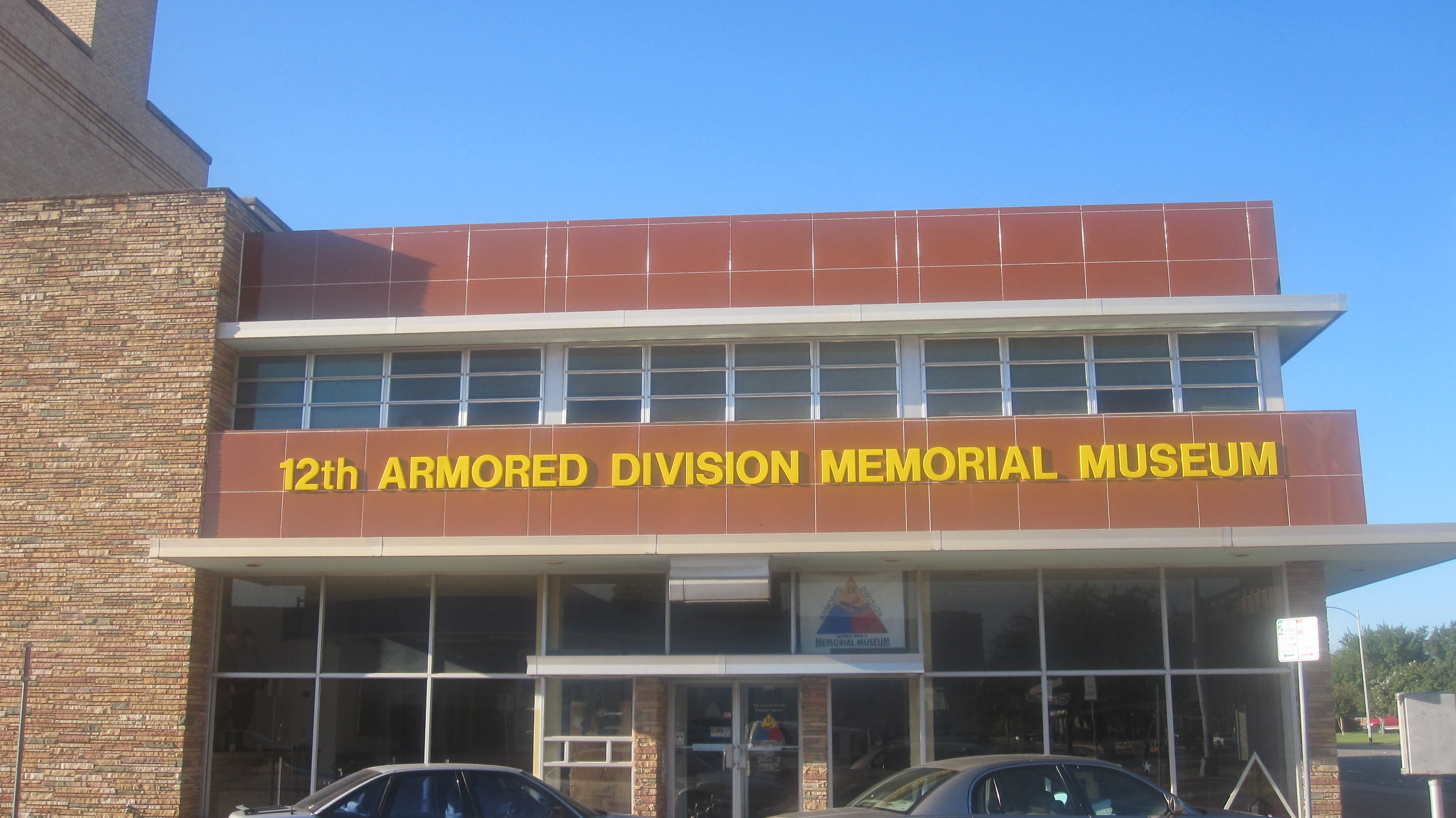
12th Armored Division Memorial Museum

In October 2001 the 12th Armored Division Memorial Museum opened its doors to the public in Abilene, Texas, with the stated mission to serve as a display and teaching museum for the study of World War II and its impact on the American people. "The Twelfth Armored Division Memorial Museum is located in Abilene, Texas, near (northeast of) the site of the former Camp Barkeley where the Division trained prior to being sent overseas into the European Theater of Operations. The Museum holds collections of the 12th Armored Division, World War II archives, memorabilia, and oral histories, along with selected equipment and material loaned or donated by others. The education plan focuses on expanding academic access to World War II historical materials, veterans, and their families; preserving the history of the 12th Armored Division for study, research, and investigations by future generations; providing training in public history professions, developing new education programs for students and establishing a technology bridge between the 12th Armored Division Historical Collection and the public."

Website: https://www.12tharmoreddivisionmuseum.com/

As part of an ongoing venture to become a larger part of the West Texas community and the greater Abilene area, 12th Armored Division Memorial Museum has partnered with the West Texas Digital Archives, providing access to copies of the "Hellcat News" from first edition to 2012.

This Website ("Humans of the 12th Armored") Accesses the Texas Archives from the Roster of the Veterans from the 12th Armored Museum Website: https://12th-armored.directory/

== See also ==
- 56th Infantry Regiment (United States) - an independent regiment prior to World War II that was integrated into the 12th AD
- 549th Engineer Light Pontoon Company - an African-American combat engineer unit which provided support to the 12th Armored Division
- 827th Tank Destroyer Battalion - a tank battalion temporarily assigned to the 12th AD
- Battle for Castle Itter
- Colmar Pocket
- Operation Nordwind
- Operation Undertone
- Seventh United States Army
- Montgomery Cunningham Meigs (1919–1944)
- Lippach massacre - A war crime committed by the 12th Armored Division on 22 April 1945

=== Notable Veterans ===
- Harry Glickman
- Edward A. Carter Jr.
- Irving Kristol
- Adolph Matulis
- Jimmie Reese
- Howard Unruh
