= Roderick R. Allen =

United States Army general (1894–1970)

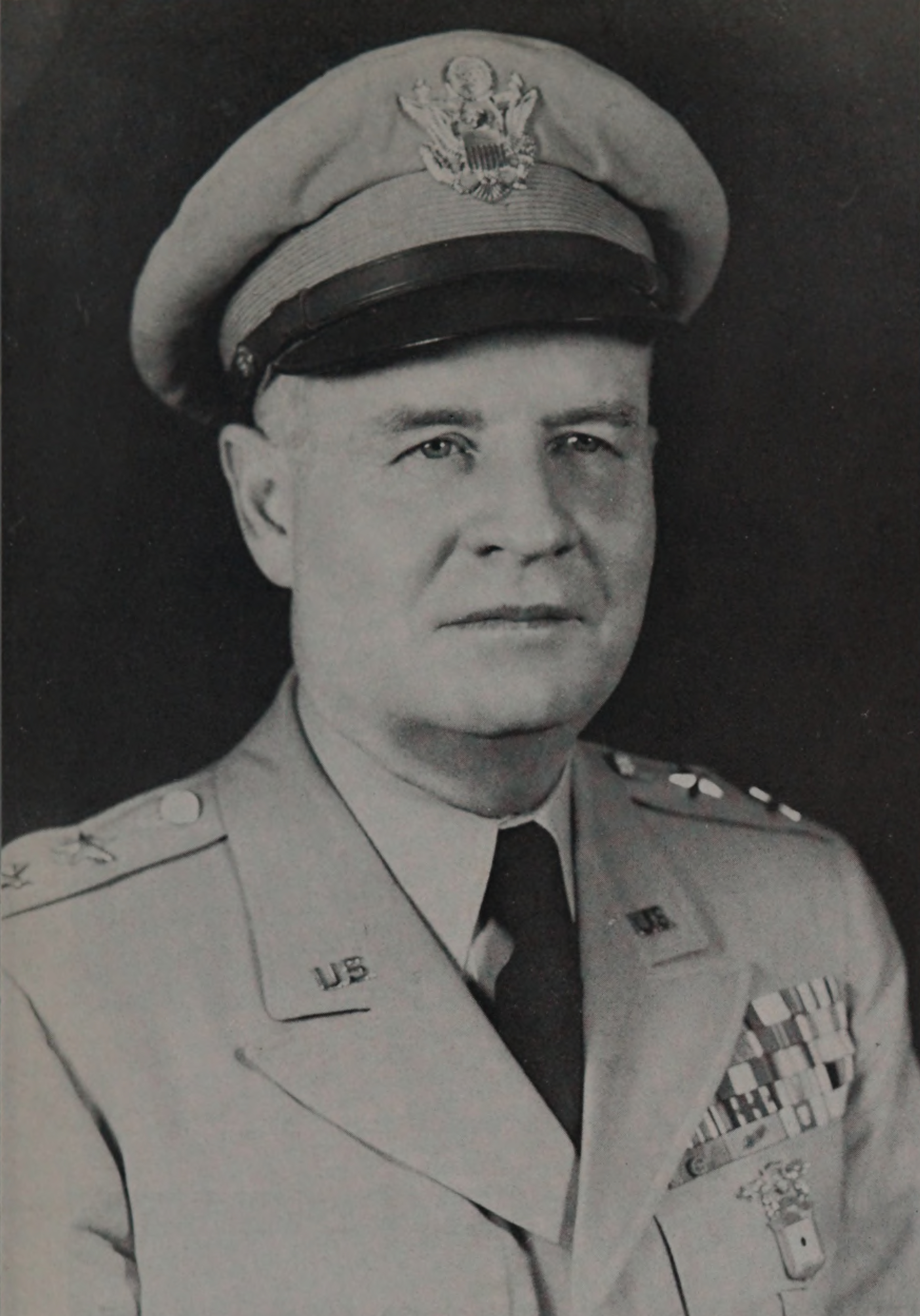
- Allen as 3rd Armored Division commander in 1950
- Born: January 29, 1894; Marshall, Texas, United States
- Died: February 1, 1970 (aged 76); Washington, D.C., United States
- Burial place: Arlington National Cemetery
- Military career
- Allegiance: United States
- Branch: United States Army
- Service years: 1916–1954
- Rank: Major General
- Service number: 0-4652
- Commands: 32nd Armored Regiment; 20th Armored Division; 12th Armored Division; 1st Armored Division; 3rd Armored Division; XVI Corps; 9th Infantry Division
- Conflicts: World War I World War II; Korean War
- Awards: Distinguished Service Medal (2); Silver Star; Legion of Merit; Bronze Star

Major General Roderick Random Allen (January 29, 1894 – February 1, 1970) was a senior United States Army officer, who commanded the 20th and 12th Armored Divisions during World War II. Under his command of the 12th AD, the division defended Strasbourg from recapture; it provided the armored contingent in the closure of the Colmar Pocket and the liberation of Colmar; it spearheaded General George Patton's drive to the Rhine; captured intact the remaining bridge over the Danube River and broke the German defense line; and played a major part in blocking the Brenner Pass, thereby trapping over a million German soldiers in Italy as the war ended. En route to the Brenner Pass it overran eleven concentration camps at Landsberg, Germany.

During the Korean War, he served on General Douglas MacArthur's general staff, was Director of Intelligence for the Army Ground Forces and commanded XVI Corps and the 9th Infantry Division.

== Early life ==
Roderick Random Allen was born on 29 January 1894 as a son of Jefferson Buffington and Emma (Albers) Allen in Marshall, Texas, and spent his childhood in Palestine, Texas. He graduated from Texas A&M in 1915 with a Bachelor of Science degree in agriculture.

== Military career ==
He entered the army, and in 1916 he was commissioned as a second lieutenant with the 16th Cavalry Regiment on 29 November 1916, and subsequently promoted to first lieutenant. He was stationed at Mercedes, Texas, on the Mexican border. He was transferred to the Third Cavalry in June 1917, was promoted to captain on 17 October 1917.

=== World War I ===
Allen was sent to France with the 3rd Cavalry Regiment with the American Expeditionary Force under command of General John J. Pershing. From November 1917 to January 1918, Allen was an aerial observer with the First Observation Squadron, Aviation Section, Signal Corps.

=== Interwar period ===
During the spring of 1919, he attended the University of Toulouse in France. In July 1919, he returned to the United States with the Third Cavalry to Fort Ethan Allen, Vermont. In 1923, he attended the Cavalry School at Fort Riley, Kansas, and was then assigned to command Company A, 7th Cavalry, Fort Bliss and served as the regimental adjutant. In 1928, he graduated from the Command and General Staff School at Fort Leavenworth, Kansas. Allen was then appointed a battalion commander of the 32nd Armor Regiment. He was promoted to major on June 20, and was assigned to the Personnel Section (of which he later became chief in 1930), Office of the Chief of Cavalry, in Washington, D.C.

From 1932 to 1934, Allen was appointed an instructor at the Command and General Staff School. He graduated from the Chemical Warfare School in 1934, the Army War College in Carlisle, Pennsylvania, in 1935, and the Naval War College in Newport, Rhode Island, in 1936. Allen was a staff officer, with the Plans and Training Division, Office of the Chief of Staff, G-3 Division at the War Department General Staff in Washington, D.C., from 1936 to 1940. He was promoted to lieutenant colonel on 1 August 1938.

In July 1940, he was made Executive Officer, First Armored Regiment, Fort Knox, Kentucky. In April 1940, he was transferred to the 3rd Armored Division, at Camp Beauregard, Louisiana. On 14 October, he was promoted to colonel, and took command of the 32rd Armored Regiment of the 3rd Armored Division.

=== World War II ===
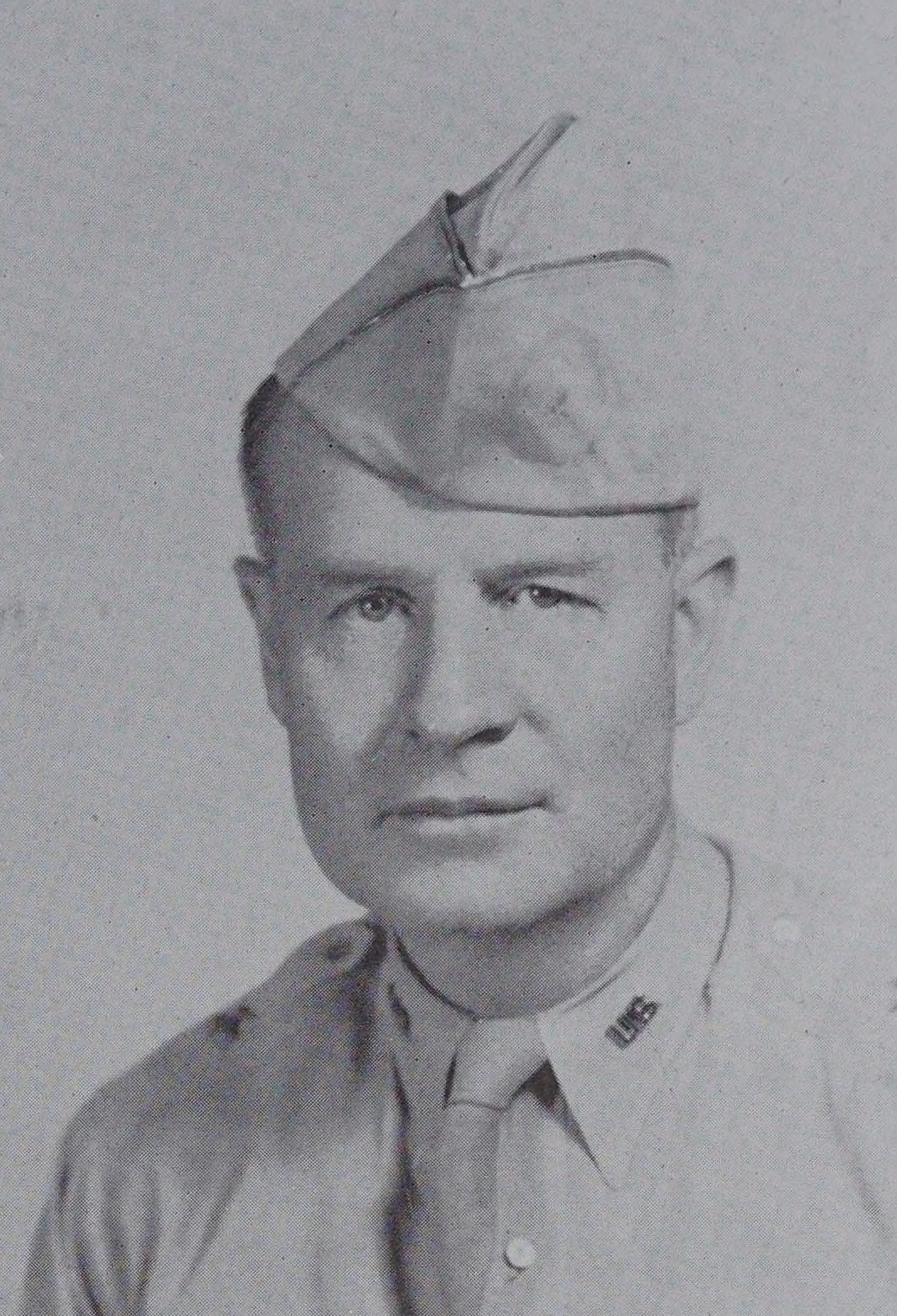
Allen as Commanding General of Combat Command A, 4th Armored Division c. 1942

In January 1942, Allen became Chief of Staff for the 6th Armored Division under command of Major General William H. H. Morris Jr. He was promoted to brigadier general, on May 23 and given command of Combat Command A, 4th Armored Division, and participated in maneuvers at the Tennessee Maneuver Area in Watertown, Tennessee, in 1942 and at the California-Arizona Maneuver Area (CAMA), California (1942–43). From October 1943 to September 1944 he was the inaugural commander the 20th Armored Division at Camp Campbell, Kentucky after its initial activation. He was promoted to major general, Army of the United States, on February 23, 1944.

On 20 September 1944, Major General Allen was given command of the 12th Armored Division (12th AD) immediately prior to the division being sent to the European Theater of Operations, taking over command from Major General Douglass T. Greene., commanding the division in Europe from September 1944 through August 1945. The division was attached to the 7th Army, commanded by Lieutenant General Alexander Patch, which had landed in the south of France in August 1944 as part of Operation Dragoon. On September 15, 1944, the 7th Army including the 12th AD was put under the field control of the Sixth United States Army Group, commanded by Gen. Jacob Devers, which also included the French First Army under French General Jean de Lattre de Tassigny. In November 1944, the 12th AD under Allen joined up with the 7th Army at Rouen.

==== Alsace and Operation Nordwind ====
The division under Gen. Allen moved against the Maginot Line fortifications in Alsace, and met unexpectedly heavy resistance from German Wehrmacht and SS Panzer Divisions. In January 1945, the 12th AD engaged in pitched battle seeking to regain ground along the southern Rhine lost during Germany's Operation Nordwind, which was an attempt by German forces to recapture Strasbourg. On 5 January 1945, the German XIV Corps under General Otto von dem Bach established a bridgehead across the Rhine at Gambsheim with the 553rd Volksgrenadier Division and German 405th Infantry Division, along the southern flank of the Allied VI Corps, while the U.S. 79th Infantry Division attempted unsuccessfully to contain the bridgehead. The Germans sent the Eighth Mountain Division across the Rhine further north on the following day, attempting to split the American defenses of the XV Corps and VI Corps, now fighting both to its northern and southern flanks. In response, the Seventh Army's Gen. Patch released the 12th Armored Division Company Command B (CCB), commanded by Col. Charles B. Bromley, to VI Corp to join the 79th ID.

Unable to advance through Herrlisheim, CCB withdrew to a complex known as la Breymuehl, (Fr: "the Waterworks"), at the intersection of an intact bridge over the Zorn River. Company B suffered a 50% casualty rate. The 714th Tank Battalion reached the Zorn and attempted to provide cover, but well-directed anti-tank artillery decimated the Medium Sherman M4A3 tanks, which withdrew from Herrlisheim after taking heavy losses. On 10 January, tanks of Company C, 714th Tank Battalion of the 12th AD reached the Zorn and prepared a combined attack with the 56th Armored Infantry Battalion (AIB). However an artillery barrage from the German defenders knocked out the CCB Command Center and the attack was canceled. The 56th AIB, normally consisting of a complement of 995 officers and enlisted men was down to a strength of only 150 men. Late in the afternoon of 10 January, Gen. Allen ordered CCB to renew its attack to reduce the bridgehead, but Col. Bromley recommended attempting to contain the bridgehead and let the Germans wear themselves out trying to sustain it. Gen. Allen then relieved Col. Bromley of command, but later restored him to his position and ordered the evacuation of Herrlisheim.

The 12th Armored Division again attacked Herrlisheim directly on January 16. On the following day of fighting, elements of 10th SS Panzer Division joined the attack and inflicted very heavy casualties, virtually wiping out the 714th Tank Battalion and the 56th Armored Infantry Battalion of the 12th Armored Division. During the 11 days of fighting around Herrlisheim, the 12th AD suffered 1,250 casualties out of a total division strength of 10,000 men, and lost 70 combat vehicles. The next day as 10th SS Panzer Division attempted to exploit its victory to the west of the town, however they sustained heavy losses as the US forces slowly withdrew and was replaced by the 36th Infantry Division. The town of Herrlisheim was finally liberated on January 31 as the Germans retired after the overall failure of their offensive.

On January 22 the division passed to the control of the French First Army for operations south of Strasbourg and assigned to the command of Gen. de Lattre de Tassigny of the French First Army in February 1945 to close the Colmar Pocket.

==== Crossing The Rhine – The Mystery Division ====
The division then assaulted the Siegfried Line, and reached the Rhine during the first week of March 1945. At that time, the division under Gen. Allen was again detached from the 7th Army and assigned to the 3rd Army under Gen. George Patton, the 12th were told to remove all of their Divisional markings and insignias, to conceal the strength of the forces Patton had under his direct command as they spearheaded the crossing of the Rhine during Operation Undertone, thus earning the moniker "The Mystery Division". Under Gen. Allen's command, the 12th AD accompanied the XXI Corps into Austria, capturing Nuremberg and then Munich, ending the war around the area of Ulm.

=== Post-World War II and Korean War ===
Following cessation of hostilities in the European Theater Operations in May 1945, from August 1945 to February 1946 Allen commanded the First Armored Division in Germany, then was director of operations, plans, and training at European Theater headquarters. He was promoted to Colonel in the Regular Army on November 1, 1945, and to Brigadier General on January 24, 1948. From 1947 to 1948, he was Director of Intelligence for U.S. Army Ground Forces. From April 1948 until June 1950, he was the commanding General, 3rd Armored Division at Fort Knox. In 1950, he was assigned to be the Deputy Chief of Staff, Far Eastern Command & UN Command, Japan & Chief of Staff, Korean Operations, based in Japan. The following year, he was given command of the XVI Corps in Japan, and in 1952, he was made Commanding General, 9th Infantry Division. His final command post was as Commanding General, New England Subarea & Boston Army Base & Fort Devens, MA from 1952 until his retirement in 1954.

Major General Roderick R. Allen retired from the Army on May 31, 1954, and lived in Washington, D.C., where he died at the age of 76 on February 1, 1970. He is buried together with his wife, Maydelle Campbell Allen (1891–1967) at Arlington National Cemetery.

== Personal life ==
On April 25, 1917, Allen married Maydelle Campbell; the couple had two daughters.

In 1968, Allen married his second wife, Eleanor Elsie Erickson Morris (1902–1992). Morris was the widow of Col. Paul H. Morris.

During his Army career, Roderick Allen was considered an outstanding marksman. In 1921–22, he was a member of the national Cavalry-Engineering Rifle Team. In 1923 he won the Distinguished Marksmanship Medal as a member of the national Cavalry Rifle Team. In 1929, he was the Captain of the Cavalry Rifle and Pistol Team.

== Decorations ==
Major General Allen's ribbon bar:

1st Row	Army Distinguished Service Medal with Oak Leaf Cluster	Silver Star	Legion of Merit	
2nd Row	Bronze Star Medal	Army Commendation Medal	Mexican Border Service Medal	World War I Victory Medal with one service star
3rd Row	American Defense Service Medal	American Campaign Medal	European-African-Middle Eastern Campaign Medal with four service stars	World War II Victory Medal
4th Row	Army of Occupation Medal	National Defense Service Medal	Korea Service Medal with two service stars	Officer of the Legion of Honor (France)
5th Row	French Croix de guerre 1939-1945 with Palm	Military Order of the White Lion	Czechoslovak War Cross 1939-1945	United Nations Korea Medal

== See also ==
- 12th Armored Division (United States)
- 20th Armored Division (United States)
- Sixth United States Army Group
- XVI Corps (United States)

Military offices
Preceded by Newly activated organization	Commanding General 20th Armored Division; 1943–1944	Succeeded by Orlando Ward
Preceded by Douglass T. Greene	Commanding General 12th Armored Division; 1944–1945	Succeeded by Willard Ames Holbrook Jr.
Preceded by Vernon Prichard	Commanding General 1st Armored Division; 1945–1946	Succeeded by Hobart R. Gay
Preceded by Ray T. Maddocks	Commanding General 3rd Armored Division; 1948–1950	Succeeded by Raymond E. S. Williamson
Preceded by Newly activated post	Commanding General XVI Corps; 1951–1952	Succeeded by Clovis E. Byers
Preceded by William K. Harrison	Commanding General 9th Infantry Division; February−June 1952	Succeeded by Homer W. Kiefer
