= Sixth United States Army Group =

- Shoulder sleeve insignia
- Active: 1 August 1944–14 July 1945
- Country: United States
- Branch: United States Army
- Type: Army group
- Role: Army group headquarters
- Size: c. 700,000 officers and men: (Note: At the end of the war, French forces in NW Europe amounted to around 450,000 men while the Seventh Army had 230,000 during the Alsatian Campaign.) Seventh US and First French Armies
- Part of: Allied Force Headquarters; Allied Expeditionary Force
- Engagements: World War II; Southern France; Rhineland; Ardennes-Alsace; Central Europe

Commanders
- Notable commanders: Gen. Jacob L. Devers

The 6th United States Army Group (also referred to as the Southern Group of Armies) was an Allied army group that fought in the European Theater of Operations during World War II. Made up of field armies from both the United States Army and the French Army, it fought in France, Germany, Austria, and, briefly, Italy. It was established in July 1944 and commanded throughout its duration by General Jacob L. Devers.

In a lead role in Operation Undertone, its Seventh Army fought its way across the Rhine into Germany, captured Nuremberg and then Munich. Finally it crossed the Brenner Pass and made contact with the US Fifth Army at Vipiteno, Italy.

== History ==
The Sixth Army Group was originally created in Corsica, France (specifically activated on 29 July 1944) as "Advanced Allied Force HQ", a special headquarters within AFHQ (the headquarters of Henry Maitland Wilson, the Supreme Commander Mediterranean Theatre) commanded by Lieutenant General Jacob L. Devers. Its initial role was to supervise the planning of the combined French First Army under Général Jean de Lattre de Tassigny and American forces which invaded southern France in Operation Dragoon and provide liaison between these forces and AFHQ. Dragoon was the operational responsibility of the Seventh United States Army commanded by Lt. Gen. Alexander Patch. Available to Patch were three corps (US VI Corps and French I and II Corps) and 24,000 Maquis of the Forces Francaises de l'Interieur. The two French corps constituted French Army B commanded by Tassigny which was later renamed French First Army. He also had the First Allied Airborne Task Force which included the First Special Service Force. Although Sixth Army Group Headquarters was officially activated on 1 August, it consisted of only the personnel of the Advanced Detachment AFHQ and, for reasons of security, retained the detachment title. The Advanced Detachment headquarters on Corsica had no command or operational duties and functioned primarily as a liaison and coordinating agency while preparing itself for the day it would become operational in France as Sixth Army Group headquarters.

Devers' headquarters remained subordinate to AFHQ during the invasion and in the weeks immediately afterwards while operational control of the troops on the ground resided with Patch until his forces linked near Dijon, France, with Twelfth United States Army Group's Third Army advancing from the west after breaking out of the Normandy beachhead. At this time, on 15 September, Devers' headquarters was designated Sixth Army Group to take operational control of Seventh Army and French Army B and came under the overall command of General Dwight D. Eisenhower, the Supreme Commander at SHAEF (Supreme Headquarters, Allied Expeditionary Forces).

In late 1944 and early 1945 the Sixth Army Group was involved in fierce fighting in the Alsace repelling the German advance during Operation Nordwind and subsequent pitched engagements closing off the Colmar Pocket and destroying the remnants of the German 19th Army. The 63rd Infantry Division was the first Seventh Army unit to cross the Siegfried Line, and the first to get an entire division through it. The 3rd Infantry Division suffered the highest casualty count of all US divisions, with over 27,000 casualties (8,000 during the Colmar Pocket).

The Army Group later advanced through Bavaria, and eventually into western Austria in the waning days of the war. Elements of Sixth Army Group linked up south of the Brenner Pass on 4 May 1945 with troops of the Fifth United States Army of the Allied 15th Army Group advancing north from Italy. Germany surrendered on 9 May 1945.

The Sixth Army Group effectively inactivated on 14 June 1945 when the US Seventh Army was selected, along with the Third Army, to form the occupation forces of Germany. It remained as an occupation and defensive force in southern Germany into the early 21st Century. It also occupied part of Austria until that country was released from occupation in the mid-1950s.

The French First Army reverted to the control of the provisional French government shortly after the surrender of Germany.

Devers relinquished command of the Sixth Army Group in late June 1945 when he was selected to take command of the Army Ground Forces in lieu of General Joseph Stilwell who was reassigned as commander of the Tenth United States Army in Okinawa following the death of General Simon Bolivar Buckner, Jr.

The Sixth Army Group was officially inactivated on 20 July 1945 after 265 days and advancing more than 900 miles, capturing almost one million Axis prisoners of war and freeing 71,400 allied prisoners.

== Insignia ==
The patch is a red square with a white fret pattern of six interlacing bars that represent the unit number as well as the strength of the force. Red is also a traditional U.S. Army color indicating command.

== Order of battle – 8 May 1945 ==
Order of battle shifted frequently in the Sixth Army Group, but accelerated dramatically during its late-war push through southern Bavaria into the Austrian Alps to head off German establishment of a National Redoubt and close off passes to Nazi escape. Order of Battle on 8 May represents a significantly different disposition in some instances than in the weeks and even days leading up to it.

- U.S. 6th Army Group – General Jacob L. Devers
  - U.S. Seventh Army – Lieutenant General Alexander M. Patch
    - 12th Armored Division – Major General Roderick R. Allen
    - 45th Infantry Division – Major General Robert T. Frederick
    - 63rd Infantry Division – Major General Louis E. Hibbs
    - 100th Infantry Division – Major General Withers A. Burress
    - VI Corps – Major General Edward H. Brooks
      - 10th Armored Division – Major General William H. H. Morris, Jr.
      - 44th Infantry Division – Major General William F. Dean
      - 103rd Infantry Division – Major General Anthony C. McAuliffe
    - XV Corps – Major General Wade H. Haislip
      - 3rd Infantry Division – Major General John W. O'Daniel
      - 20th Armored Division – Major General Orlando Ward
      - 42nd Infantry Division – Major General Harry J. Collins
      - 86th Infantry Division – Major General Harris M. Melasky
    - XXI Corps – Major General Frank W. Milburn
      - 36th Infantry Division – Major General John E. Dahlquist
      - 101st Airborne Division – Major General Maxwell D. Taylor
      - French 2nd Armored Division
  - French First Army – General Jean de Lattre de Tassigny
    - French 1st Corps – Lieutenant General Antoine Béthouart
      - French 2nd Moroccan Infantry Division – Brigadier General François de Linarès
      - French 4th Moroccan Mountain Division – Major General Rene de Hasdin
      - French 9th Colonial Infantry Division – Brigadier General Jean-Étienne Valluy
      - French 10th Infantry Division – Brigadier General Pierre Billotte
      - French 1st Armored Division – Brigadier General Aime Sudre
    - French 2nd Corps – Lieutenant General Joseph de Goislard de Monsabert
      - French 1st Infantry Division – Brigadier General Jean Callies
      - French 3rd Algerian Infantry Division – Major General Augustin Guillaume
      - French 14th Infantry Division – Brigadier General Raoul Salan
      - French 5th Armored Division – Brigadier General Guy Schlesser
  - Detachment Army of the Alps – Lieutenant General Paul Doyen
    - French 1st Motorised Infantry Division – Brigadier General Pierre Garbay
    - French 27th Alpine Infantry Division – Colonel Jean Vallette d'Osia

== See also ==
- Colmar Pocket
- Operation Dragoon
- Western Allied invasion of Germany
