= 67th Infantry Regiment (United States) =

- Active: July 1918–February 1919
- Country: United States
- Branch: United States Army
- Type: Infantry
- Part of: 17th Infantry Brigade, 9th Division

The 67th Infantry Regiment was an infantry regiment of the United States Army during World War I. Organized in mid-1918 at Camp Sheridan, the regiment was preparing to go overseas with the 9th Division when the war ended. It was demobilized shortly thereafter.

== History ==
The 67th Infantry Regiment was constituted on 5 July 1918 in the Regular Army and organized during the same month with the new 9th Division at Camp Sheridan from a cadre of the 45th Infantry Regiment. The new unit was commanded by Major Byard Sneed, who was replaced by Colonel Moor N. Falls from mid-August. Among the officers from the cadre was future novelist F. Scott Fitzgerald, who became a first lieutenant in the regiment. Assigned to the 17th Infantry Brigade together with the 45th, the regiment was brought up to strength with draftees. The division began systematic training in August and on 28 October its advance detachment moved to Camp Mills to prepare for overseas departure, delayed by a curtailment of training activities during September and October due to Spanish flu. Four soldiers of the division were among those who died of the disease on one of the deadliest days in terms of influenza deaths at Camp Sheridan, 22 October. When the Armistice was signed on 11 November, all overseas movements were suspended and the advance detachment returned to Camp Sheridan. In December, the regiment was split up, with the 1st Battalion moving to Camp McClellan and the 3rd Battalion to Camp Shelby for garrison duty. Demobilization was ordered on 17 January 1919 and completed on 15 February.
