= Russell Maxwell =

United States Army general

Russell L. Maxwell
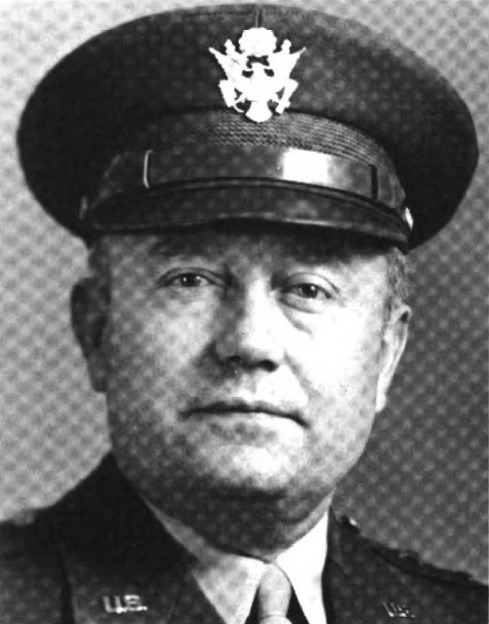
- Born: 28 December 1890; Oakdale, Illinois, United States
- Died: 24 November 1968 (aged 77); Washington, D.C., United States
- Burial place: West Point Cemetery, New York, United States
- Alma mater: United States Military Academy; United States Army Command and General Staff College; Army Industrial College; United States Army War College
- Military career
- Allegiance: United States
- Branch: United States Army
- Service years: 1912–1946
- Rank: Major General
- Unit: Ordnance Corps
- Conflicts: World War I; World War II

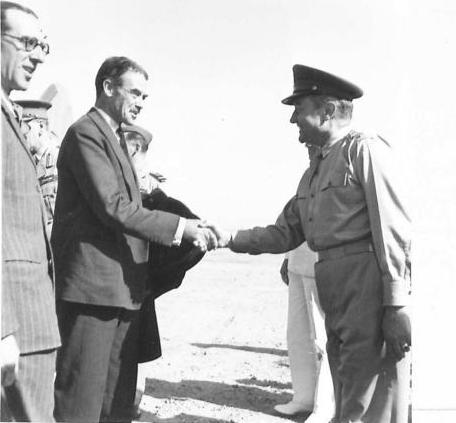
Maxwell shaking hands with Richard Casey in 1942

Russell Lamonte Maxwell (28 December 1890 – 24 November 1968) was an officer in the U.S. Army.

== Military career ==
Born in Oakdale, Illinois, and raised in Modesto, California, Maxwell graduated 10th in a class of 95 from the United States Military Academy in June 1912 where he was classmates with several men who later reached the rank of general officer, such as Walter M. Robertson, Walton Walker, Wade H. Haislip, John Shirley Wood, Robert McGowan Littlejohn, Gilbert R. Cook, Raymond O. Barton, Charles C. Drake, Millard Harmon, Harry J. Malony, Stephen J. Chamberlin, Franklin C. Sibert, Albert E. Brown, Archibald Vincent Arnold, Davenport Johnson and Bradford G. Chynoweth and William H. Wilbur.

Commissioned as a field artillery officer, Maxwell transferred to the Ordnance Department and became an expert on military explosives. He graduated from the Command and General Staff School in 1924, the Army Industrial College in 1925 and the Army War College in 1934. By February 1941, Colonel Maxwell was the Administrator of Export Control.

Shortly before United States entry into World War II, Maxwell was promoted to brigadier general and sent to North Africa as head of the US Military North African Mission. He was the Lend Lease coordinator in the area. Maxwell became the Commanding General U.S. Army Forces in the Middle East (USAFIME) which consisted largely of Army Air Forces units.

On 4 November 1942, Lieutenant General Frank M. Andrews replaced Maxwell as commander of USAFIME.

A German merchant ship, the Liebenfels, salvaged at Massawa, Italian Eritrea by Navy Commander Edward Ellsberg working under Maxwell's direction was named for General Maxwell. The General Maxwell was later renamed Empire Nile by the British.

From 30 September 1943 to 14 March 1946, Maxwell served as the Assistant Chief of Staff, G-4, in the War Department General Staff.

He served as a major general from 9 March 1942 to 30 September 1946.

Maxwell died at his home in Washington, D.C., and was buried at the West Point Cemetery on 27 November 1968.
