= Charles Coolidge =

Charles Coolidge may refer to:

- Charles A. Coolidge (1844–1926), U.S. Army general
- Charles Allerton Coolidge (1858–1936), American architect
- Charles H. Coolidge (1921–2021), U.S. Army soldier and Medal of Honor recipient
- Charles H. Coolidge Jr. (born 1946), United States Air Force lieutenant general, son of the above
