= 55th Medical Group =

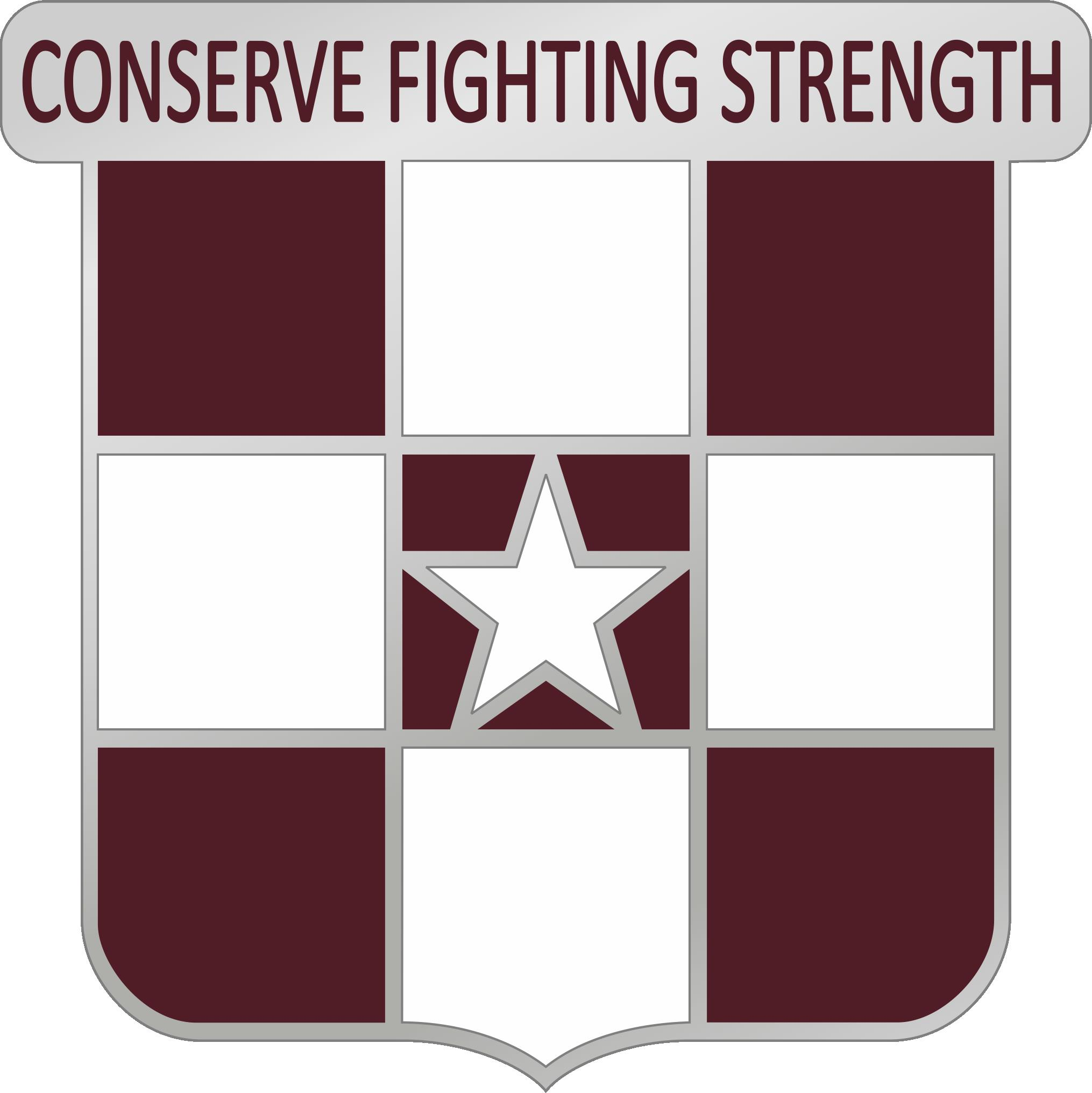
- Distinctive unit insignia, 55th Medical Group
- Active: 13 January 1941 - 3 March 1946 6 September 1955 - 25 June 1970; 25 March 1971 - 21 September 1974 1 October 1992 - 21 April 2000
- Country: United States
- Allegiance: Regular Army
- Branch: U.S. Army
- Type: Medical Group
- Motto: Conserve the Fighting Strength
- Colors: Maroon and White
- Engagements: World War II; Vietnam War; Cold War
- Battle honours: Meritorious Unit Commendation (Army), Streamer Embroidered: VIETNAM 1966-1968 VIETNAM 1968-1969

Commanders
- Notable commanders: Major General Alvin L. Gorby, MC

The 55th Medical Group was constituted on 13 January 1941, in the Regular Army as the 55th Medical Battalion. The battalion served in combat in Europe in World War II. Later reorganized as a medical group, the unit again saw combat in the Republic of Vietnam. It was stationed at Fort Bragg, North Carolina during the Cold War, before and after its deployment to Vietnam and again in the 1990s.

== Lineage ==
- Constituted on 13 January 1941 in the Regular Army as the 55th Medical Battalion.
- Activated on 2 February 1941 at Fort Sam Houston, Texas
- Reorganized and re-designated on 7 July 1942 as the 55th Medical Battalion, Motorized.
- Battalion converted from Organic to Separate on 4 April 1944 and its elements reorganized and redesignated as follows:
1. Headquarters and Headquarters Detachment as Headquarters and Headquarters Detachment, 55th Medical Battalion.
2. Company A, as the 494th Medical Collecting Company - hereafter separate lineage.
3. Company B, as the 495th Medical Collecting Company - hereafter separate lineage.
4. Company C, as the 496th Medical Collecting Company - hereafter separate lineages.
5. Clearing Company, as the 650th Medical Clearing Company - hereafter separate lineage.
- Inactivated 3 March 1946, in Germany.
- Activated 6 September 1955 at Fort Bragg, North Carolina
- Reorganized and re-designated 20 December 1956 as Headquarters and Headquarters Detachment, 55th Medical Group.
- Inactivated 25 June 1970 in Vietnam.
- Activated 25 March 1971 at Fort Bragg, North Carolina.
- Inactivated 21 September 1974 at Fort Bragg, North Carolina.
- Activated 1 October 1992 at Fort Bragg, North Carolina.
- Inactivated 18 July 2001 at Fort Bragg, North Carolina.

== Honors ==
=== Campaign participation credit ===
- World War II
  - Normandy
  - Northern France
  - Rhineland
  - Ardennes-Alsace
  - Central Europe
- Vietnam
  - Counteroffensive
  - Counteroffensive, Phase II
  - Counteroffensive, Phase III
  - Tet Counteroffensive
  - Counteroffensive, Phase IV
  - Counteroffensive, Phase V
  - Counteroffensive, Phase VI
  - Tet 69/Counteroffensive
  - Summer-Fall 1969
  - Winter-Spring 1970
  - Sanctuary Counteroffensive

=== Decorations ===
- Meritorious Unit Commendation (Army) for:
1. VIETNAM 1966-1968
2. VIETNAM 1968-1969

== History ==
=== World War II ===
==== 1941 ====
The 55th Medical Battalion (Corps) was activated 10 February 1941 at Fort Sam Houston, Texas in accordance with General Order No. 3, Headquarters Fort Sam Houston, Texas. Three Medical Corps Captains, fifteen Medical Corps First Lieutenants, two Dental Corps First Lieutenants, three Medical Administrative Corps First Lieutenants, and one Medical Administrative Corps Second Lieutenant were assigned to the organization under the command of Major Alvin L. Gorby, Medical Corps, who was transferred from the 2nd Medical Battalion, 2nd Division. A cadre of twenty enlisted men from the Second Medical Battalion, Fort Sam Houston, Texas was transferred to this organization. The organization was assigned barracks in the vicinity of the W. W. White Road and Garden Avenue on the Fort Sam Houston Reservation, was brought to training strength by the receipt of 440 selectees from the Fort Sam Houston Reception Center, and a unit training program was started.

A medical battalion (corps) had the same general function for the corps troops as the division medical battalion did to the division, with the additional mission of reinforcing divisional medical battalions as required. As originally organized, the battalion had a headquarters battalion, three lettered collecting companies (A-C companies), and a clearing company (D company). The headquarters detachment distributed medical supplies to the battalion and also established a medical supply point for medical detachments in the corps area. The collecting companies established corps collecting stations when necessary, supported or reinforced division collecting companies, provided area sanitation, additional litter bearers for hospitals operating in the corps area, and their ambulance sections could operate area ambulance services. The battalion clearing company established clearing stations for corps troops or could be used to relieve or reinforce divisional clearing stations. They could be used to relieve hospitals of minor, contagious, or chemical casualties or, when properly augmented by teams from an auxiliary surgical group, in place of a surgical hospital for limited periods of time.

On June 1, 1941, Major Frank Y. Leaver, Medical Corps assumed command. On the same date a detachment of enlisted men and two officers departed from Fort Sam Houston, Texas, at 7:30 a.m. for the VIII Army Corps field Exercises in the vicinity of Rising Star, Texas. On June 2, 1941, a detachment of 60 enlisted men from Company "C" departed for the VIII Army Corps Field Exercises. June 4, 1941, four officers and three enlisted men departed; and on June 7, 1941, the remainder of the 55th Medical Battalion departed for the maneuver area. The battalion furnished second-echelon medical attention for the VIII Army Corps Troops. At the close of the exercises the battalion returned to Fort Sam Houston, Texas, closing on the post on return on June 16, 1941.

After the June maneuvers the battalion resumed training and began preparation for the August and September maneuvers in the Louisiana Maneuver Area. On August 5, 1941, a detachment from Headquarters Detachment, Companies “A” and “D” left Fort Sam Houston for the initial bivouac area near Mansfield, Louisiana. The remainder of the Headquarters Detachment, Companies “B” and “C” left home station on August 10, 1941. The whole Battalion was assembled in bivouac on August 11, 1941. Second echelon medical attention was furnished the VIII Army Corps Troops during the entire maneuver period in addition to the operation of medical supply service to the Corps Troops. The strength of the Corps Troops varied from about 8,000 to 14,000. The battalion moved by shuttling a total of twelve times during the maneuvers. Moves were coordinated in such a manner that one platoon of Company “D” had a clearing station set up at all times, for the care and treatment of patients. A total of 1483 ill and 200 injured were treated, and 525 of these cases were evacuated to hospitals by Army units. The entire battalion returned to Fort Sam Houston on October 2, 1941.

The experience gained in these maneuvers demonstrated that litter bearers in the Collecting Companies could be greatly reduced or eliminated as in all cases evacuation from Corps Troops could be accomplished by ambulance directly. A shortage of transportation restricted the use of the Collecting Companies and multiple trips using organic transportation was necessary to move the battalion.

Care and operation of motor transportation was stressed upon return from maneuvers and the battalion received a commendation on their motor maintenance and the excellent condition of their vehicles from the 2nd Division Motor Inspector.

By the end of 1941, the battalion had 30 of its 34 authorized officers assigned, with their maximum number of months of duty, excluding the commanding officer, being 30 months, the minimum one month, and the average eleven months. The enlisted strength of the battalion at year end was 280 assigned against 434 authorizations. Most of this was due to the transfer of men over 28 years old to the Enlisted Reserve Corps.

==== 1942 ====
In July 1942 the battalion again participated in the maneuvers in Louisiana, this time on a scale smaller than those of the 1941 Louisiana Maneuvers, again is support of the VIII Corps (redesignated from the VIII Army Corps), which was also headquartered at Fort Sam Houston. The Headquarters Detachment and companies A and D returned to Fort Sam Houston in September, with companies B and C joining them at their home station in November 1942.

==== 1943 ====
After completion of training and the 1942 Louisiana maneuvers, the battalion was ordered to Desert Training Center, California and arrived at Camp Young on 1 February 1943. Training was carried out in Camp Young, California, with the unit performing its primary mission. The ultimate purpose of the training was to prepare the battalion to operate effectively for the care and transportation of casualties and to participate with higher units in field exercises. In order to accomplish this purpose the training was conducted by the individual companies under a master schedule issued by battalion headquarters. In later phases of unit training, the organization participated in large scale field exercises conducted by higher headquarters.

The battalion received training in all phases of its primary mission while at Desert Training Center. In addition to participating in maneuvers conducted by IV Armored Corps and IX Corps the battalion operated a dispensary serving the 76th Field Artillery Brigade, in addition to its usual duties.

In August 1943, the battalion was transferred to the Communication Zone, Desert Training Center. The battalion under Communication Zone operated the central dispensary at Camp Young, two reinforced ambulance detachments, and constructed and operated the 500 bed Banning Convalescent Hospital. The two reinforced ambulance detachments, in a period of 2 months evacuated 6,814 patients, traveling a distance of 253,004 miles without an accident.

At the end of 1943 the authorized strength of the battalion was 25 Medical Corps officers, 2 Dental Corps officers, 8 Medical Administrative Corps officers, and an attached Chaplain, as well as 484 enlisted.

Life at Camp Young was austere. At Fort Sam Houston the battalion was quartered in wooden barracks and serviced by the Post Laundry. During its stay at the Desert Training Center the battalion was quartered in pyramidal tents. There were no bathing installations a greater portion of the time they were there, and the men of the battalion constructed showers by adding shower heads and reversing the flow of water from the unit water trailers. Laundry was provided by civilian establishments and occasionally by Quartermaster mobile laundry units but were never adequate, the service being very unreliable and at times unavailable.

Additionally, at Fort Sam Houston the battalion received Class A rations which were prepared in permanent post mess halls. In DTC, the rations were chiefly types “B” and “C” and were prepared on the unit's field ranges. Sewage and wastes were disposed of by incineration and burial. Insect control was not a problem except for flies at Desert Training Center-which were controlled through use of fly traps, swatting and other usual controls.

In December 1943, the 55th Medical Battalion arrived in the European Theater of Operations and began intensive training for expected operations on the continent.

==== 1944 ====
After arriving in the United Kingdom, the battalion was stationed in Northern Ireland where it underwent an intensive training schedule, including night problems. Visual Training Aids, Training Films and T/E equipment were used in the program. Later, the entire battalion was transported to England in preparation for operations on the continent.

The battalion's primary function remained to render 2d Echelon medical support to non-divisional units. Casualties were treated at the Clearing Station and either evacuated to the Evacuation Hospital or kept in the Clearing Station depending upon the nature or seriousness of the casualty. Evacuation was accomplished as expeditiously as possible and in coordination with ambulance control points.

In April 1944 the 55th Medical Battalion underwent a reorganization, with the Headquarters Detachment becoming a separate battalion headquarters and headquarters detachment detachment and the companies each becoming separate, numbered companies. At the end of the year, the battalion consisted of the headquarters and headquarters detachment, the 694th and 696th Medical Companies (Collecting)—the battalion's former A and C Companies, and the second platoon of the 650th Medical Company (Clearing)—part of the former D Company. The 495th Medical Company (Collecting)—the Former D Company—was reassigned to the Third U. S. Army Headquarters and 1st Platoon of the 650th Medical Company was relieved in the latter part of October and was operating under direct control of the Seventh U. S. Army.

This reorganization presented greater flexibility, allowing units to be tailored based on the mission, rather than having a fixed number and type of units in a battalion or regiment. The number of companies of a given type (ambulance, clearing, or collecting) could be increased or decreased based on the anticipated mission and workload, rather than leaving some companied over- or under-employed.

==== 1945 ====
From January to V-E Day, the 55th Medical Battalion, consisting of the 494th and 496th Medical Companies (Collecting) and the 650th Medical Company (Clearing), operated under XV Corps, Seventh Army. The primary mission of the battalion continued to be to furnish second echelon Medical support to non-divisional and Corps Units.

To facilitate operations the 494th Medical Company (Collecting) was assigned the mission of supporting the XV Corps Artillery. The company received all movement orders directly from Headquarters XV Corps Artillery and a Collecting Station was usually established within the vicinity of the Artillery Headquarters. Ambulances from the company were forward located with all the Artillery Group Headquarters whenever possible. This facilitated and speeded the evacuation of patients and casualties to the Collecting Station. At the Collecting Station at least three ambulances were always retained for the purpose of evacuating to the Clearing Station. All evacuations were made to the 650th Medical Company (Clearing), except in rare emergencies when casualties were taken to nearest Divisional Clearing Station or Field Hospital Platoon.

The one main difficulty encountered by the 494th Medical Company was the shortage of transportation created by having ambulances forward located with the Artillery Group Headquarters. These ambulances were not available for transportation when the company moved. To overcome this problem and to avoid the necessity of shuttling, the company procured three captured German trucks. This enabled the company to move in a single movement.

As of 1 January 1945, the 496th Medical Company (Collecting) was operating a Collection Station in support of three Engineer Groups of XV Corps. Ambulances were attached to each group. In addition, ambulance service was furnished to Corps Headquarters and the 650th Medical Company (Clearing). Ambulances attached to the Clearing Company were used to evacuate Clearing Station.

On 3 January 1945 the 496th was relieved from this assignment and attached to the 44th Infantry Division. The company was then given the mission of supporting the 253rd Infantry Regiment of the 63rd Infantry Division as the regiment had no collection company for support at that time. Operations were under the 44th Infantry Division. This mission was completed on 10 January 1945.

From 11 January to 26 January 1945 the 496th Medical Company (Collecting) was attached to XXI Corps and the 433rd Medical Battalion for operations, the company directly supported the 275th Infantry Regiment of the 70th Infantry Division and the 106th Cavalry Group, then acting as infantry.

Returning to the control the 55th Medical Battalion and XV Corps on 26 January, the company continued to support the 275th Infantry Regiment until 8 February 1945. The 496th Medical Company then resumed its primary mission with XV Corps, supporting two Engineer Groups and one Cavalry Group. This mission continued until the end of the war in Europe which found the company in Salzburg, Austria.

On 10 May 1945 the 496th was ordered to report to the Camp Surgeon at the Dachau concentration camp to assist in correcting and improving the sanitary condition of the camp. The company took charge of water purification and supply, general camp sanitation and burial of the dead. This Mission was completed 9 June 1945.

The beginning of 1945 found the 650th Medical Company (Clearing) split into two separately functioning platoons. Headquarters Section and the first platoon were operating directly under Seventh Army and functioning as a 150-bed expansion unit with the 132nd Evacuation Hospital. The second platoon operating under the 55th Medical Battalion and XV Corps, was performing the primary mission of the company, supplying second echelon medical support to XV Corps Troops.

The first platoon and headquarters section, after completing its mission with the evacuation hospital, was then attached to XXI Corps where it was to operate as the XXI Corps Clearing Station. However, due to tactical situation, the platoon functioned both as XXI Corps Clearing Station and 70th Infantry Division Clearing Station for a two-week period until the Division Clearing Company (Company D, 370th Medical Battalion) arrived in theater.

Soon after the 370th Medical Battalion's clearing station arrived and became operational, the 650th Medical Company headquarters section and first platoon were reattached to XV Corps and the 55th Medical Battalion where continued to operate, together with the second platoon, as a Corps Clearing Company. In the movement through France and Germany into Austria, the platoons were leap-frogged, each platoon thus alternated in going forward with the forward elements of XV Corps.

January 1945 found the Headquarters and Headquarters Detachment 55th Medical Battalion assigned to Seventh Army and attached to XV Corps for operations. The mission of the headquarters was to perform administrative and operational details for all attached companies. The Battalion CP was usually set up within the immediate vicinity of XV Corps Headquarters, and telephone facilities were furnished by the corps signal battalion and communications were never a problem. Messing facilities were furnished by either the first or second platoon of the 650th Medical Company (Clearing). Transportation was never a major problem for the battalion headquarters in the way it was for the companies.

During the rapid advance following the crossing of the Rhine, a great many German Military Hospitals and Prisoner of War Camps were overrun. A number of officers from the battalion were called upon to inspect these installations and detailed reports concerning number of patients, status of supplies, and other items were rendered to the Corps Surgeon's Office. The end of the war in Europe found the battalion headquarters in Salzburg, Austria.

In general the battalion and its attached companies had found little difficulty in adapting themselves to any operational situation. The largest problems were shortages of transportation. T/E transportation for the Medical Collecting Company is inadequate when ambulances must be placed on Detached Service.

At the beginning of June 1945, the battalion was still operating as a Corps Medical Battalion furnishing medical support for XV Corps Troops.

Shortages of well-trained Medical Department personnel has never presented a serious problem. Although shortages have existed, the unit has always managed to perform its mission satisfactorily.

During most of the first six months of 1945 the battalion and its subordinate companies were housed in school buildings, military barracks, hotels, and similar facilities and it was seldom necessary to use tentage for housing. Water supply was drawn at established Engineer Water Points, and laundry and bathing facilities were usually taken care of by the various Fumigation and Bath and Laundry units.

Two dental laboratories were attached to the 650th Medical Company (Clearing) to provide facilities to take care of dentures for men who ordinarily would have had to be sent back to an evacuation hospital. These facilities, in addition to those provided by the company's own two dental officers, were available to all Corps Troops. During periods when the front was more or less stable, these four dentists worked continuously and at times had as much as a four-week backlog of patients.

In all of the work which was performed by the 650th Medical Company (Clearing), the Battalion Surgeon, Major Delmar E. Domke, and Lieutenant Colonel Alvin L. Gorby, MC, were credited with the overall direction, administration, and execution of the mission of the company. The Battalion Surgeon was in the field at all times except when in the hospital in the rear area of operations or on temporary duty in the rear area of operations. The Battalion Surgeon was the direct supervisor of all enlisted men and all commissioned officers of the company.

The mission of the 650th Medical Company (Clearing) was to support non-divisional units and to perform its own evacuation and evacuation service. The 650th Medical Company (Clearing) maintained a Clearing Station in the field and performed evacuation service in accordance with the requirements of the Battalion Surgeon.

The 494th Medical Company (Collecting) operated the 650th Medical Company (Clearing) on a daily basis, performing the same missions. The Battalion Surgeon, the company commander, the first lieutenant and the captain of the 650th Medical Company (Clearing) were in direct supervision of the mission of the company.

The 496th Medical Company (Collecting) was attached to the 70th Infantry Division as a Collecting Company. Its mission was to support the 70th Infantry Division. The Collecting Company operated a clearing station and provided evacuation service. The company commander was in direct supervision of the mission of the company.

Evacuation Service was provided by the Collecting Companies of the battalion, but the 496th Medical Company (Collecting) operated an additional collecting station for the 275th Infantry Regiment.

The battalion supported the Seventh Army as the VII Corps Medical Battalion. The mission was to provide second echelon medical support to the VII Corps.

Evacuation of patients from the Clearing Station was at times the responsibility of the 55th Medical Battalion while at other times ambulances from Seventh Army were attached to the battalion for that purpose. In almost all cases four ambulances were enough to carry out that mission. Casualties among troops in the corps rear area were very light.

V-E Day found the battalion at Salzburg, Austria. Soon after, movement orders were received for the 55th to proceed to Bamberg, Germany. On 10 July, the Headquarters left Salzburg, Austria at 0620 hrs by motor convoy and arrived in Bamberg, Germany the same day. The battalion was given a new mission of supervising the operational control of all German Prisoner of War Hospitals in the Main Franken, and Ober Franken Area, totaling forty-five hospitals in all. In order to effectively handle this mission the 585th Medical Company (Ambulance), the 594th Medical Company (Ambulance), the 616th, 614th, 677th, 639th, and 684th Medical Companies (Clearing), and a platoon of the 42d Field Hospital were attached to the 55th Medical Battalion. As redeployment gathered momentum, the 585th Medical Company (Ambulance), the 614th, the 677th, the 616th Medical Companies (Clearing), and the First Platoon of the 42d Field Hospital were redeployed. The 639th Medical Company (Clearing) was given the mission of operating a 50-bed dispensary for XV Corps Troops. The 684th Medical Company (Clearing) was then placed in a non-operational status, and the majority of their personnel were transferred to the 639th Medical Company (Clearing) to fill T/O vacancies caused by men being redeployed to the states.

On 15 November 1945 the main body of personnel of Headquarters and Headquarters Detachment, 432d Medical Battalion, was transferred to the Headquarters and Headquarters Detachment, 55th Medical Battalion. This transfer filled vacancies in the T/O of Headquarters and Headquarters Detachment, 55th Medical Battalion caused by redeployment of personnel eligible for return to the U. S. for discharge. At this time Lieutenant Colonel Delmar E. Domke, formerly Commanding Officer of the 432d Medical Battalion, assumed command of the 55th Medical Battalion per paragraph, 1, General Order Number 7, Headquarters, 55th Medical Battalion, dated 15 November 1945.

A discharge team was organized from personnel in the 55th Medical Battalion headquarters for the purpose of screening and discharging German Prisoner of War Personnel in the facilities under the control of the battalion. By the end of 1945 the team, working in conjunction with the Counter Intelligence Corps had screened, processed, and discharged over 2700 personnel to civilian status as they became eligible for release.

On 23 November 1945 the 458th Dental Prosthetic Team was attached to the 55th Medical Battalion. This team consisting of one Dental Corps Captain and three dental technicians who worked in conjunction with the dental office of the 639th Medical Company (Clearing), making complete dentures and servicing XV Corps and Army Troops in the battalion's area of operations.

By the end of 1945, the Battalion S-3 Section and the 594th Medical Company (Ambulance) had taken over the complete supervision of the remaining thirty German Prisoner of War Hospitals under the control of the battalion.

The battalion headquarters was inactivated on 3 March 1946 in Germany.

=== Fort Bragg, 1955–1965 ===
The 5th Evacuation Hospital (Semimobile), which had previously seen service in both World Wars, was again activated at Fort Bragg on 2 October 1950, and would serve at Fort Bragg through various reconfigurations as a Combat Support Hospital, again as an Evacuation Hospital, and as a Mobile Army Surgical Hospital, before finally being inactivated in the late 1990s.

The 56th Medical Detachment (Helicopter Ambulance) was transferred from Camp Zama, Japan to Fort Bragg on 1 July 1955, with the first personnel assigned to the detachment arriving in August, but no aircraft were assigned to the unit for another year. The detachment flew its first evacuation mission in August 1956, completing a total of 56 evacuation missions in 1956; 166 in 1957; 199 in 1958, 155 in 1959, and an unknown number in 1960 before it was inactivated on 15 August 1960.

On 20 December 1956, the 55th Medical Battalion was reorganized and redesignated as the 55th Medical Group.

A medical group was a regimental level headquarters—indeed, many of the medical groups in the army had originally been medical regiments—commanded by a Medical Corps colonel with a small staff that provided command and control of subordinate battalions and hospitals on the battlefield.

The 45th Medical Company (Air Ambulance) was activated at Fort Bragg, North Carolina on 6 June 1960, partly staffed and equipped using assets from the 56th Medical Detachment (Helicopter Ambulance). The 45th would serve at Fort Bragg until it departed for Vietnam on 16 July 1967.

The 2nd Surgical Hospital (Mobile) (Army) was alerted for overseas movement on 2 August 1965, and departed Fort Bragg for the Republic of Vietnam on 15 October 1965, arriving in country on 7 November 1965.

By 1966, the 55th Medical Group was composed of the following units:

- **Headquarters and Headquarters Detachment, 55th Medical Group**
- 5th Evacuation Hospital (Semi-mobile)
- 15th Field Hospital
- 34th Medical Detachment (KK)
- **39th Medical Detachment (KJ) (Dental Services)**
- **45th Medical Company (Air Ambulance)**
- 69th Medical Detachment (JA) (Veterinary Services Team, Large)
- **545th Medical Detachment (FC, GB, GC) (Medical Supply)**
- **563rd Medical Company (Clearing)**
- **584th Medical Company (Ambulance)**
- 714th Preventive Medicine Unit (Service) (Field)

The organizations shown in bold would all deploy to the Republic of Vietnam and serve under the 44th Medical Brigade, if not under the 55th Medical Group itself.

On 10 January 1966 the group headquarters was alerted for deployment to the Republic of Vietnam and began preparing for overseas movement. On 16 April the group was relieved of command responsibility for all subordinate units at Fort Bragg to allow it to concentrate fully on deployment preparation. The group's main body shipped for Vietnam aboard the USNS General W. H. Gordon (AP-117) on 16 May 1966, arriving at the port of Qui Nhon, Vietnam on 10 June 1966. An advance party consisting of the group executive officer, S-3, and S-4 departed the United States by air on 22 May and arrived in Vietnam the next day.

=== In Vietnam ===
==== 1969 ====
- Group Headquarters reduced to zero strength on June 15, 1969, and assigned to Headquarters, 68th Medical Group for Command and Control.

==== 1970 ====
- Inactivated in the Republic of Vietnam on June 25, 1970

=== Back at Fort Bragg ===
- Activated 25 March 1971 at Fort Bragg, North Carolina.
- Inactivated 21 September 1974, with the group staff serving as cadre for the newly reactivated 44th Medical Brigade, and the group commander, COL Robert E. Mathias, assuming command of the brigade.
- Activated 1 October 1992 at Fort Bragg, North Carolina, as part of the 44th Medical Command.
- Inactivated 218 July 2001.

== Distinctive unit insignia ==
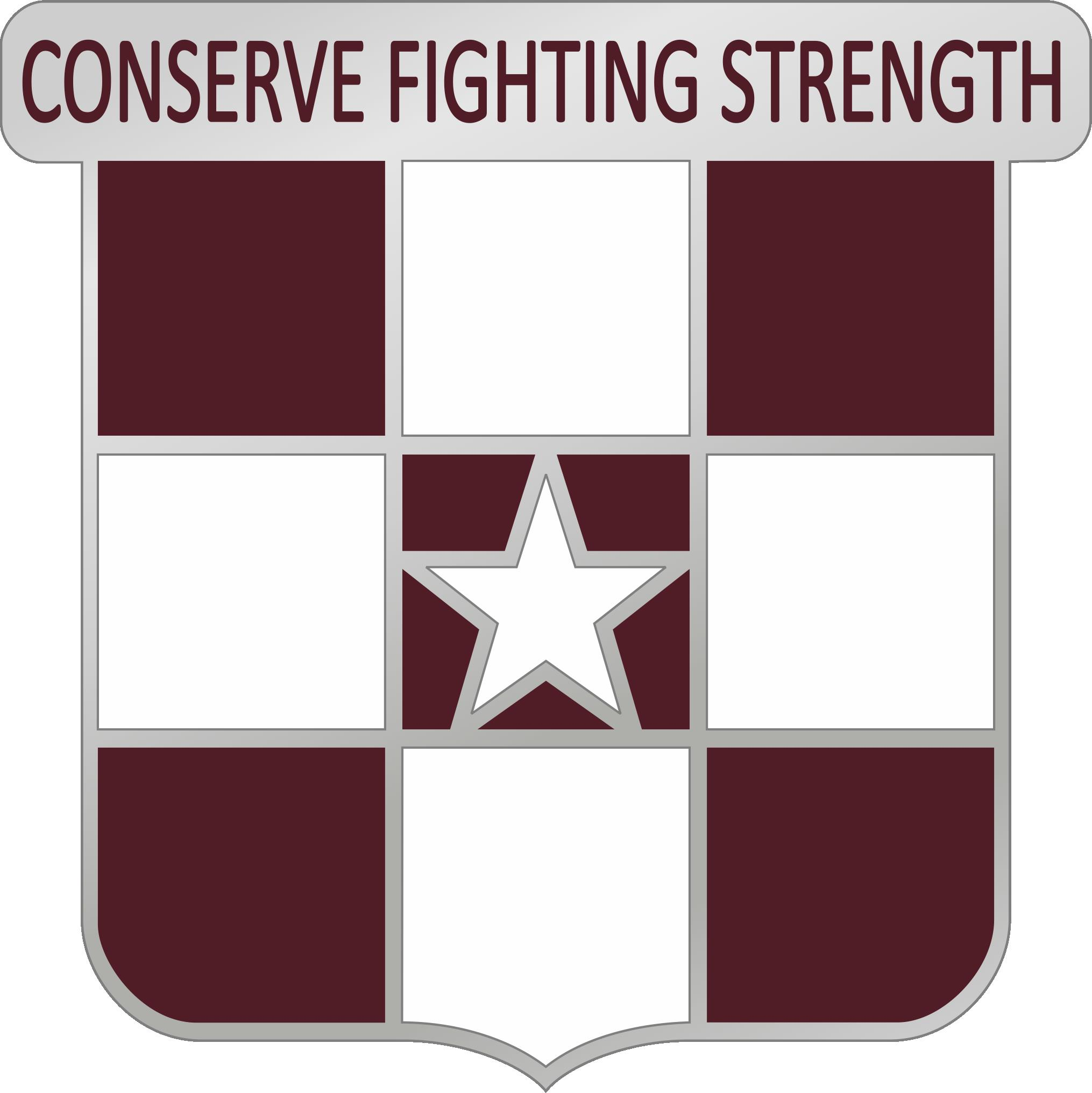
Distinctive Unit Insignia, 55th Medical Group

=== Description ===
A Silver color metal and enamel device 1 and 1/8 inches (2.86 cm) in height overall consisting of a shield blazoned: Sanguine, a cross quarterly pierced Argent in fess point a mullet of the like. Attached above the shield a rounded Silver scroll inscribed “CONSERVE FIGHTING STRENGTH” in Maroon letters.

=== Symbolism ===
The shield is in the colors of the Army Medical Service. The cross represents the nature of the service of the unit and the mullet indicates the organization's point of origin as Texas. The five maroon areas also allude to the five World War II campaign streamers credited to the organization.

=== Background ===
The distinctive unit insignia was originally approved for the 55th Medical Battalion on 20 June 1941. It was redesignated for the Headquarters and Headquarters Detachment, 55th Medical Battalion on 29 May 1957. The insignia was redesignated for the 55th Medical Group on 15 December 1967.

== Commanders ==
=== World War II ===
Rank	Commander name	Branch	Start date	End date	Remarks
MAJ	Alvin L. Gorby	MC	10 February 1941	1 June 1941	Gorby retired as a major general in 1961 as the commanding general of Valley Forge General Hospital
MAJ	Frank Y. Leaver	MC	1 June 1941		
LTC	Delmar E. Domke	MC	15 November 1945		Domke had been commanding the 432nd Medical Battalion

=== Fort Bragg and Vietnam ===
Rank	Commander Name	Branch	Start date	End date	Remarks
			6 September 1955		Reactivated as the 55th Medical Battalion
COL	Philip P. Traina	MC			In command in 1958
COL	Peter S. Scales	MC		July 1965	
LTC	Richard F. Barquist	MC	July 1965	December 1965	LTC Barquist assumed command of the 58th Medical Battalion at Long Binh Post, Republic of Vietnam on 1 February 1966 and is the namesake of the Barquist Army Health Clinic, Fort Detrick, Maryland
LTC	Robert E. Kreidinger	MSC	December 1965	April 4, 1966	LTC Kreidinger assumed the duties of group executive officer upon the assignment of COL O'Dell and deployed to the Republic of Vietnam with the group headquarters
COL	Edward T. O’Dell	MC	5 April 1966	30 November 1966	
LTC	Robert H. Holzworth	MC	1 December 1966	4 December 1966	
LTC	Robert M. Hall	MC	5 December 1966	14 April 1967	
LTC	Henry C. Cosand	MC	15 April 1967	21 June 1967	Cosand is listed as “Acting Commander”
COL	Alexander M. Boysen	MC	22 June 1967	12 June 1968	Boysen spent three years as a prisoner of the North Koreans and Chinese during the Korean War
LTC	Howard A. Boyd	MC	13 June 1968	21 June 1968	
COL	Darl E. Vander Ploeg	MC	22 June 1968		

=== Post-Vietnam ===
Rank	Commander Name	Branch	Start date	End date	Remarks
			25 March 1971		
COL	John O. Williams	MSC		~July 1974	Retired 31 August 1974
COL	Robert E. Mathias	MSC	~July 1974	21 September 1974	COL Mathias commanded the 55th Medical Group until it was reflagged as the 44th Medical Brigade on 21 September 1974

=== 1990s Reactivation ===
Rank	Commander name	Branch	Start date	End date	Remarks
COL	Myung H. Kim	MSC	1 October 1992	22 July 1993	Assumed command of the group when it was reactivated upon the 44th Medical Brigade's conversion to a flag-level command; he had commanded the brigade until its conversion
COL	Gerald R. Palmer	MSC	22 July 1993	17 July 1995	
COL	Frederick Gerber	MSC	17 July 1995	July 1997	
COL	John Paul Hightower	MSC	July 1997	July 1999	
COL	Leif G. Johnson	MSC	July 1999	18 July 2001	Cased the colors
