= Belmont-sur-Buttant =

- Commune
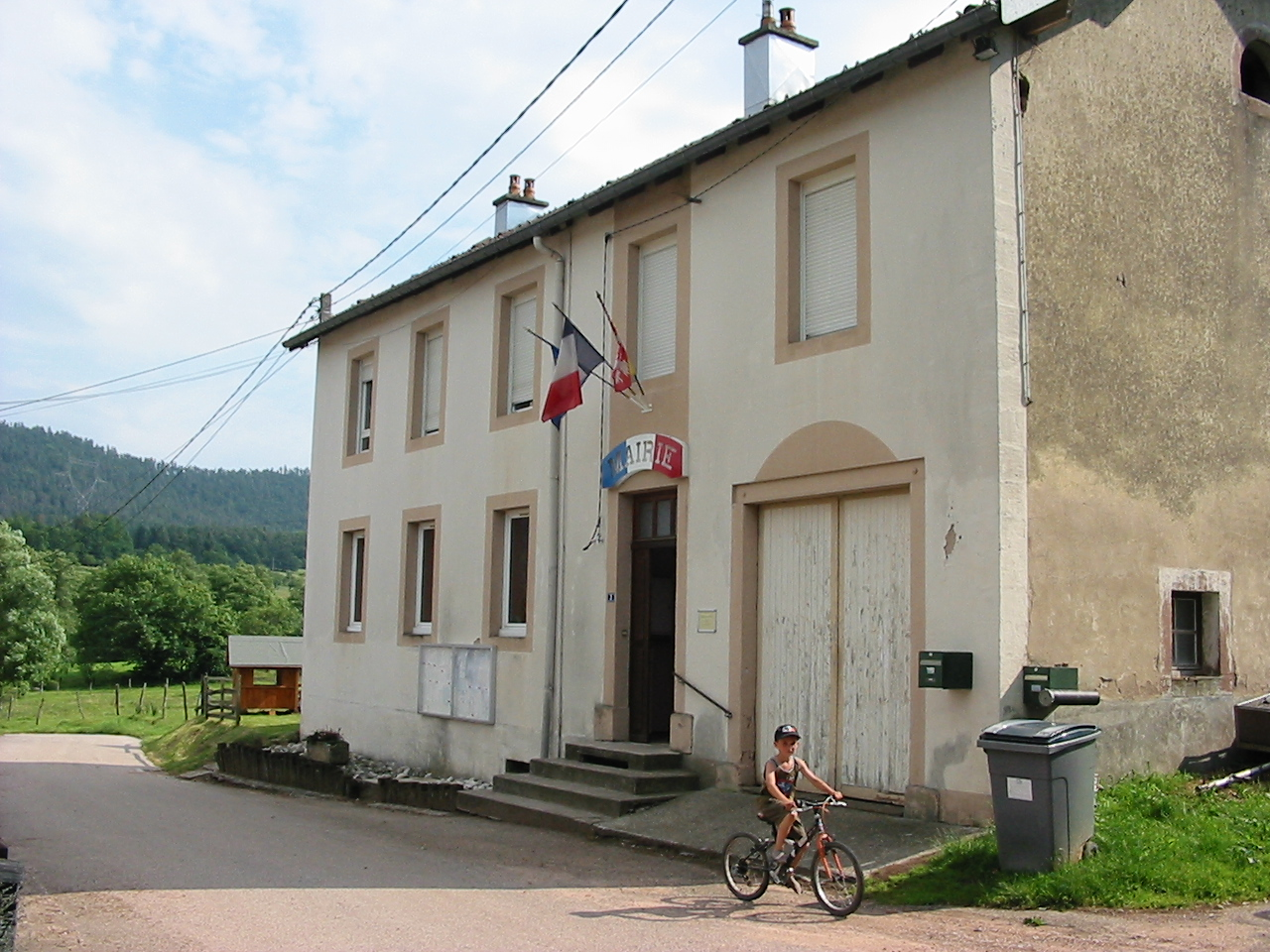
- The town hall in Belmont-sur-Buttant

- Coat of arms
- Location of Belmont-sur-Buttant
- Location within France Location within Grand Est
- Coordinates: 48°13′34″N 6°45′58″E
- Country: France
- Region: Grand Est
- Department: Vosges
- Arrondissement: Saint-Dié-des-Vosges
- Canton: Bruyères
- Intercommunality: CC Bruyères - Vallons des Vosges

Government
  - Mayor (2020–2026): Bernadette Poirat
- Area^{1}: 8.46 km^{2} (3.27 sq mi)
- Elevation: 400 m (1,300 ft)
- Highest elevation: 680 m (2,230 ft)
- Lowest elevation: 383 m (1,257 ft)
- Population (2023): 293
  - Density: 34.6/km^{2} (89.7/sq mi)
- Time zone: UTC+01:00 (CET)
  - Summer (DST): UTC+02:00 (CEST)
- INSEE/Postal code: 88050 /88600
- ^{1} French Land Register data, which excludes lakes, ponds, glaciers > 1 km^{2} (0.386 sq mi or 247 acres) and river estuaries.

Belmont-sur-Buttant (French pronunciation: [bɛlmɔ̃ syʁ bytɑ̃]) is a commune in the Vosges department in Grand Est in northeastern France.

== History ==
During four days of attacks at Hill 623, east of Belmont-sur-Buttant in the Vosges Mountains in France, Charles H. Coolidge and his group held off numerous enemy infantrymen, plus two tanks on October 27 using grenades. One tank unsuccessfully fired five separate rounds directly at Coolidge. For his actions above and beyond the call of duty during the battle, Coolidge was presented the Medal of Honor by Lieutenant General Wade H. Haislip during a ceremony at an airfield near Dornstadt, Germany on June 18, 1945.

== See also ==
- Communes of the Vosges department
