= Robert McGowan Littlejohn =

American army general (1890–1982)

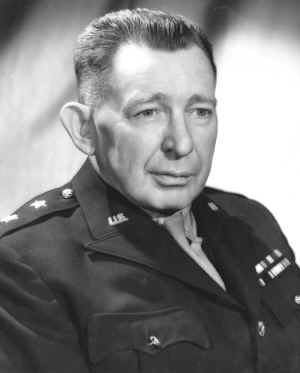
- Born: 23 October 1890; Jonesville, South Carolina
- Died: 6 May 1982 (aged 91); Washington, D.C.
- Burial place: Arlington National Cemetery
- Military career
- Allegiance: United States
- Branch: United States Army
- Service years: 1912–1946
- Rank: Major General
- Service number: O-3373
- Commands: American Graves Registration Command
- Conflicts: World War I: Pancho Villa Expedition; Western Front; Occupation of the Rhineland; World War II: Normandy; Northern France; Battle of the Bulge; Central Europe
- Awards: Army Distinguished Service Medal (2); Legion of Merit; Bronze Star Medal; Order of the Bath (UK); Croix de Guerre (France); Order of Orange Nassau (Netherlands)
- Other work: head of the War Assets Administration

Robert McGowan Littlejohn (23 October 1890 – 6 May 1982) was a major general in the United States Army who graduated from the United States Military Academy at West Point, New York, in 1912. He served with the Pancho Villa Expedition and on the Western Front during the First World War, and was Chief Quartermaster for the European Theater of Operations during the Second World War. For this service, he received the Distinguished Service Medal. Upon retirement from the Army in 1946, then President of the United States Harry S. Truman appointed him head of the War Assets Administration.

== Early life and World War I ==
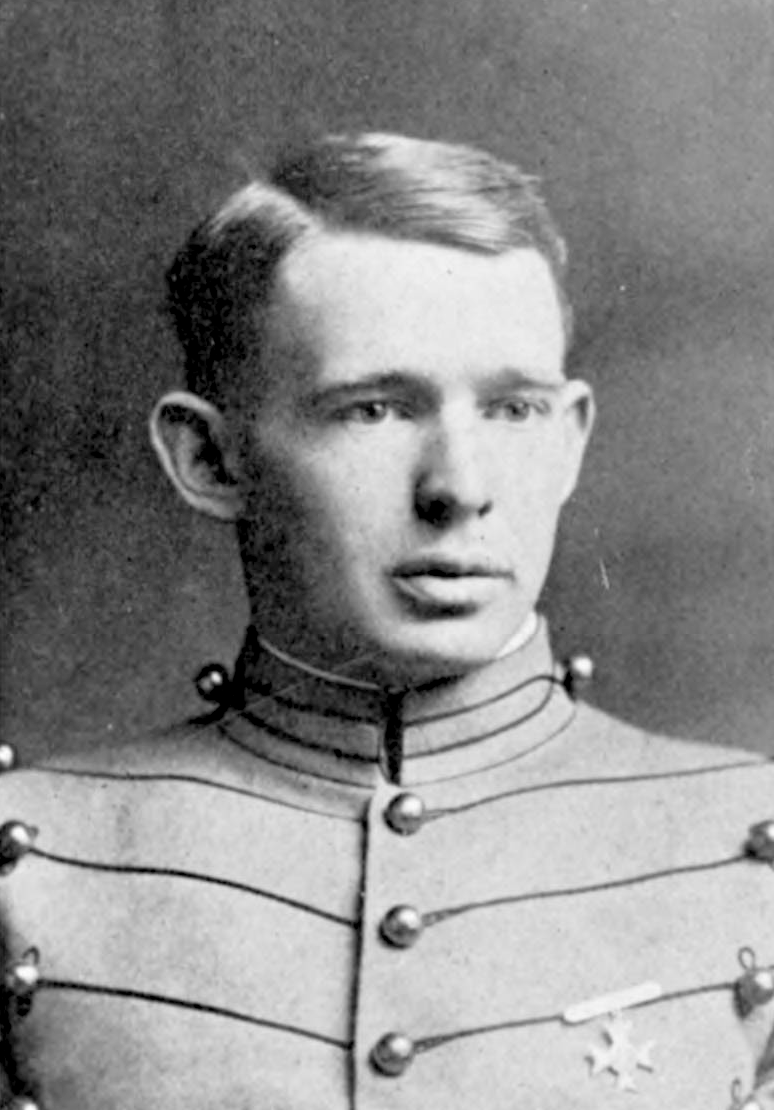
At West Point in 1912

Robert McGowan Littlejohn was born in Jonesville, South Carolina, on 23 October 1890. He attended Clemson Agricultural College for a year, before entering the United States Military Academy at West Point, New York, on 2 March 1908. He played right tackle on the 1912 Army Cadets football team.

On 12 June 1912, Littlejohn graduated 36th in the West Point class of 1912 (just ahead of Wade H. Haislip). Several of his fellow graduates would, like Littlejohn himself, eventually attain general officer rank, such as Walter M. Robertson, William H. Wilbur, Walton Walker, John Shirley Wood, Franklin C. Sibert, Harry J. Malony, Stephen J. Chamberlin, Raymond O. Barton and Gilbert R. Cook. He was commissioned into the Cavalry Branchas a second lieutenant in the 8th Cavalry Regiment and posted to Fort William McKinley in the Philippines. The 8th Cavalry Regiment returned to the United States in August 1915, and moved to Fort Bliss, Texas. From January to March 1916, it served on the Texas border during the Pancho Villa Expedition. On 1 July 1916, he was promoted to first lieutenant, and posted to the newly constituted 17th Cavalry Regiment at Fort Bliss as commander of the regiment's machine gun detachment. He was promoted to captain on 15 May 1917, almost six weeks after the American entry into World War I. Two days later the regiment moved to Douglas, Arizona, and was involved in strike duty in July and August during the miners' strike in Globe, Arizona. He played polo on the 8th and 17th Cavalry teams.

Littlejohn returned to West Point on 24 August 1917 as an instructor, first in the English department for ten days, then in the Chemistry department, and finally, in March 1918, in the Engineering department. On 5 May 1918, he was posted to the 18th Machine Gun Battalion of the 6th Division at Camp Wadsworth, South Carolina, with the rank of major from 7 June 1918. He assumed command of the 332nd Machine Gun Battalion at Camp Grant, Illinois, on 11 June. This battalion was part of the 86th Division. On 27 July 1918, he married Mary Lambert from Glastonbury, Connecticut. They had no children.

The 332nd Machine Gun Battalion moved to France in September 1918, where it joined the American Expeditionary Force (AEF) on the Western Front but did not see action before the armistice. In December 1918, he participated in the Occupation of the Rhineland, as commander of a battalion of the 39th Infantry Regiment of the 4th Division. On 1 March 1919 he assumed command of the 11th Machine Gun Battalion, the machine gun unit of the same brigade. On 1 May he was posted to the office of Chief Quartermaster of the AEF before returning home in July.

== Between the wars ==
From 28 July 1919 to 1 February 1920, Littlejohn was stationed in Raleigh, North Carolina, as Assistant District Inspector of the Reserve Officers' Training Corps. He then went to Charleston, South Carolina, as Assistant Department Adjutant on the staff of the Southeastern Department. He reverted to his substantive rank of captain on 15 March 1920, but was promoted to major again on 1 July. On 1 August he was assigned to the Quartermaster of the Fourth Corps Area which replaced the Southeastern Department and soon moved to Fort McPherson, Georgia.

Littlejohn transferred to the Quartermaster Corps on 20 October. From 11 January to 15 December 1921 he was a student at the Quartermaster Corps Subsistence School in Chicago; on graduation, he became the assistant commandant. He attended the Command and General Staff School at Fort Leavenworth, Kansas, from August 1925 to July 1926, and on graduation became an instructor there. He then attended the United States Army War College from August 1929 to July 1930.

After graduation, Littlejohn served on the War Department General Staff in Washington, D.C., from 15 August 1930 to 13 June 1934. He then returned to West Point for a second tour of duty, this time as a quartermaster. While there he was promoted to lieutenant colonel on 1 August 1935. This ended on 31 January 1938, and he was sent for a second tour of duty in the Philippines, this time as executive officer of the Quartermaster Depot, and then, from 30 May 1939, as Quartermaster of the Philippine Department. His tour of duty there ended on 20 May 1940, and he returned to the US in June.

== Second World War ==
From June 1940 to May 1942, Littlejohn commanded the Clothing and Equipage Branch in the Office of the Quartermaster General. The division was primarily concerned with procurement, but was accustomed to working closely with the Standardization Branch, which was responsible for design and development. He was promoted to colonel on 16 November 1940 and brigadier general on 30 January 1942.

It will be my policy to hide nothing. Every successful businessman does make mistakes, admits them, profits from them, does not repeat them.

— Robert Littlejohn,

In May 1942, Littlejohn was appointed Quartermaster General of the European Theater of Operations (ETO) by the new CG-SOS-ETO Lt. Gen. John C. H. Lee, a position he held for the rest of the war, with the rank of major general from 3 November 1943. For his services as Quartermaster General, Littlejohn was awarded the Army Distinguished Service Medal with a Bronze Oak Leaf Cluster, the Legion of Merit, the Bronze Star Medal, and foreign awards that included the British Order of the Bath, French Croix de Guerre and Dutch Order of Orange Nassau. His first Distinguished Service Medal citation read, in part:

General Littlejohn displayed marked aggressiveness, exceptional organizing ability, and a superior quality of leadership in rapidly establishing a quartermaster service throughout the theater which met and solved the many unexpected and seemingly insurmountable problems of supply. By his broad experience, foresight and splendid ability which was largely instrumental under his leadership in solving many complex questions in organization and supply of the African Task Force. His untiring efforts and devotion to duty in this connection contributed markedly to the successful landing of this force in North Africa on November 8, 1942.

His later Oak Leaf Cluster citation noted that he "not only maintained anticipated requirements, but exceeded them". However Littlejohn was severely criticised when winter clothing was not delivered in a timely manner, resulting in thousands of cases of trench foot and frostbite.

== Later life ==
Littlejohn hoped to become the next Quartermaster General, but was passed over in favor of Major General Thomas B. Larkin, a United States Army Corps of Engineers officer that Littlejohn considered a "carpetbagger". Both had served in the ETO in the Services of Supply (later the Communications Zone) under Lt. Gen. John C. H. Lee beginning in May 1942. Larkin had served as Lee's deputy until he was spun off at the request of Eisenhower to command the SOS in the Mediterranean Theater of Operations invasions of North Africa, Sicily, and Italy, and so had a wider command experience. Littlejohn retired with a disability discharge on 31 July 1946. President of the United States Harry S. Truman appointed him head of the War Assets Administration (WAA), which had the responsibility for the disposal of some $34 billion worth of surplus government property. The job was considered a thankless one, and corruption was a major concern. He instituted a sweeping reorganization of the WAA. In one sale, the WAA sold 20,960 war planes, accepting bids of $6,582,156 for the lot, which had originally cost $3,900,000,000. He left the WAA in 1948.

In retirement, Littlejohn felt that his work was under-appreciated. He disliked the series of monographs written on Quartermaster operations in the ETO by historians at Fort Lee, Virginia, and attacked Roland Ruppenthal's magisterial two-volume Logistic Support of the Armies (1953 and 1959) in the United States Army in World War II series as a slanderous attack on his reputation.

Littlejohn died from cardiorespiratory failure at a nursing home in Wisconsin Avenue in Washington, D.C., on 6 May 1982. His wife had predeceased him on 9 December 1978. They were interred together in Arlington National Cemetery.

== Dates of rank ==
Insignia	Rank	Component	Date	Reference
	Second lieutenant	8th Cavalry	12 June 1912	
	First lieutenant	17th Cavalry	1 July 1916	
	Captain	17th Cavalry	15 May 1917	
	Major	National Army	7 June 1918	
	Captain	reverted	15 March 1920	
	Major	Cavalry	1 July 1920	
	Major	Quartermaster Corps	20 October 1920	
	Lieutenant colonel	Quartermaster Corps	1 August 1935	
	Colonel	Army of the United States	16 November 1940	
	Brigadier general	Army of the United States	30 January 1942	
	Colonel	Quartermaster Corps	1 February 1942	
	Major general	Army of the United States	3 November 1943	
	Major general	Retired	31 July 1946	
