= XV Corps (United States) =

- Shoulder sleeve insignia of XV Corps
- Active: 1 October 1933–31 March 1946; 25 March 1948–1 April 1953; 26 December 1957–31 March 1968
- Country: United States of America
- Branch: United States Army
- Role: Headquarters
- Size: Corps
- Engagements: World War II; Normandy; Northern France; Rhineland; Ardennes-Alsace; Central Europe

Commanders
- Notable commanders: Wade H. Haislip; John W. Harmony

Insignia
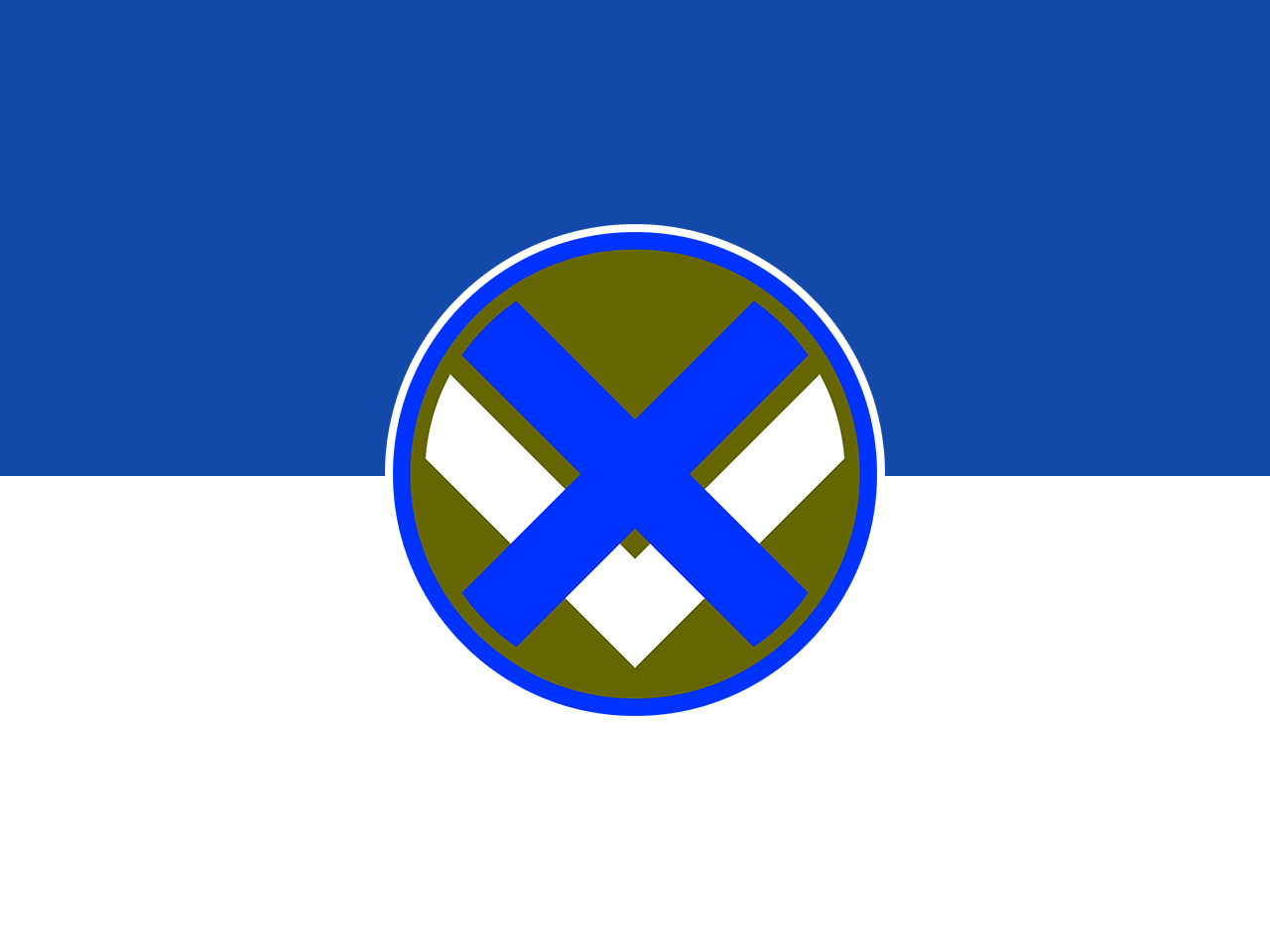
- XV Corps Flag

The XV Corps of the US Army was initially constituted on 1 October 1933 as part of the Organized Reserves, and was activated on 15 February 1943 at Camp Beauregard, Louisiana. During the Second World War, XV Corps fought for 307 days in the European Theater of Operations, fighting from Normandy through France and southern Germany into Austria. The corps was commanded in combat by Major General Wade H. Haislip, initially as a subordinate unit to the Third U.S. Army and later as part of the Seventh U.S. Army.

After the end of the war the corps was inactivated and reactivated several times, finally being inactivated in 1968.

== Interwar period ==
=== XV Corps (I) ===
The XV Corps was authorized by the National Defense Act of 1920 and was to be composed of units of the Organized Reserve located primarily in the Fifth Corps Area. The corps headquarters and headquarters company were constituted on 29 July 1921 in the Regular Army, allotted to the Fifth Corps Area, and assigned to the Fifth Army. The corps headquarters was organized in January 1922 with Reserve personnel as a "Regular Army Inactive" (RAI) unit at Columbus, Ohio. The headquarters company was organized about August 1924 with Reserve personnel at Cleveland, Ohio, and relocated on 9 July 1931 to Columbus. The headquarters was withdrawn from the Regular Army on 1 October 1933 and demobilized.

=== XV Corps (II) ===
The second iteration of the XV Corps was constituted in the Organized Reserve on 1 October 1933, allotted to the Fifth Corps Area, and assigned to the Second Army. The corps headquarters was concurrently initiated at Indianapolis, Indiana, with the Reserve personnel previously assigned to the demobilized XV Corps (RAI). The designated mobilization station was Fort Hayes, Ohio, where the corps headquarters would assume command and control of its subordinate corps troops which would then be mobilizing throughout the Fifth Corps Area. It was redesignated 1 January 1941 as headquarters, XV Army Corps. The XV Corps was not activated prior to World War II and was located in Indianapolis as of 7 December 1941 in an inactive reserve status.

== Normandy ==
The headquarters, XV Army Corps, was redesignated on 19 August 1942 as headquarters, XV Corps, and ordered into active military service at Camp Beauregard, Louisiana, on 15 February 1943.

XV Corps took part in the July 1944 breakout from Normandy, Operation Cobra. The corps liberated Le Mans on 8 August 1944. In a controversial decision by the Twelfth United States Army Group commander, Lieutenant General Omar Bradley, the corps was halted at Argentan on 13 August 1944, before it could link up with Canadian troops, allowing Germans trapped in the Falaise Pocket an escape route to the east. Seizing a bridgehead over the Seine River on 20 August 1944, the corps then mopped up German resistance along its west bank. Subsequently, the corps had no divisions assigned to it and used its corps troops to screen the southern flank of the U.S. XII Corps.

== Lorraine ==
On 11 September, XV Corps drove toward the Moselle River and crossed it at Charmes the following day. On 13 September, the French 2nd Armored Division, assigned to the corps, destroyed a German Panzer brigade in the town of Dompaire. After several days of battle, XV Corps liberated Lunéville on 22 September 1944. From 28 September until 10 October 1944, the corps cleared the Forêt de Parroy in Lorraine against determined German resistance. For another 12 days, XV Corps fought to capture the hill mass east of the Forêt de Parroy On 1 November 1944, the corps' French 2nd Armored Division took Baccarat after a two-day battle. From 13 to 19 November 1944, XV Corps pierced German defenses in the Vosges Mountains near Sarrebourg, enabling the French 2nd Armored Division to force the Saverne Gap and liberate Strasbourg on 23 November 1944. This breakthrough unbalanced German defenses in the northern Vosges and opened the way for Seventh Army troops to advance into Alsace and reach the Rhine River.

== Alsace ==
On 5 December 1944, the corps moved north against German defenses in the Maginot Line around Bitche. The fighting for the old French forts continued until 20 December 1944. Thereafter, the corps assumed a defensive stance. The corps withstood a fierce German counter-offensive (Operation Nordwind) into Alsace during January 1945. During this period, XV Corps defended well, restored most of its original position by 7 January 1945, and assumed a defensive stance again until mid-February. From 15 to 23 February 1945, the corps made limited attacks, seizing Forbach, Gros Recherding, and hills south of Saarbrücken. Subsequently, the corps rested and prepared for offensive action designed to breach the Siegfried Line and invade Germany.

== Germany and Austria ==
On 15 March 1945, XV Corps (along with the VI Corps and the XXI Corps) launched a major offensive (Operation Undertone). On 20 March 1945, the corps broke through the Siegfried Line, captured Homburg and Zweibrücken and then assaulted across the Rhine River in the region of Worms and Mannheim on 26 March 1945. From 28 March until 3 April 1945 it fought in the Battle of Aschaffenburg. Taking Bamberg on 13 April 1945, the corps moved south and seized Nuremberg on 20 April 1945 after five days of house-to-house combat. On 30 April 1945, the corps took Munich, and by the next day the corps had advanced to Salzburg, Austria, where combat operations for the corps ceased.

== Campaign credits and inactivation ==
XV Corps is credited with service in the Normandy, Northern France, Rhineland, Ardennes-Alsace, and Central Europe campaigns. XV Corps Headquarters was inactivated in Germany on 31 March 1946. Subsequent to the Second World War, the corps was activated and inactivated several times, with the last inactivation occurring on 31 March 1968 at the Presidio of San Francisco, California.

== Commanders ==
- Lieutenant General Wade H. Haislip (February, 1943 – June, 1945)
- Major General Walter M. Robertson (June, 1945 – March, 1946)

== Subordination ==
U.S. Third Army	6 Jul 1944 – 23 Aug 1944
U.S. First Army	24 Aug 1944 – 28 Aug 1944
U.S. Third Army	29 Aug 1944 – 28 Sep 1944
U.S. Seventh Army	29 Sep 1944 – VE Day

== Sources ==
- Weigley, Russell F., (1981). "Eisenhower's Lieutenants". Bloomington: Indiana University Press. ISBN 0-253-13333-5.
- Williams, Mary H., compiler (1958). "U.S. Army in World War II, Chronology 1941–1945". Washington, D.C.: Government Printing Office.
- Wilson, John B., compiler (1999). "Armies, Corps, Divisions, and Separate Brigades". Washington, D.C.: Government Printing Office. ISBN 0-16-049994-1.
