= Charles H. Coolidge =

United States Army Medal of Honor recipient

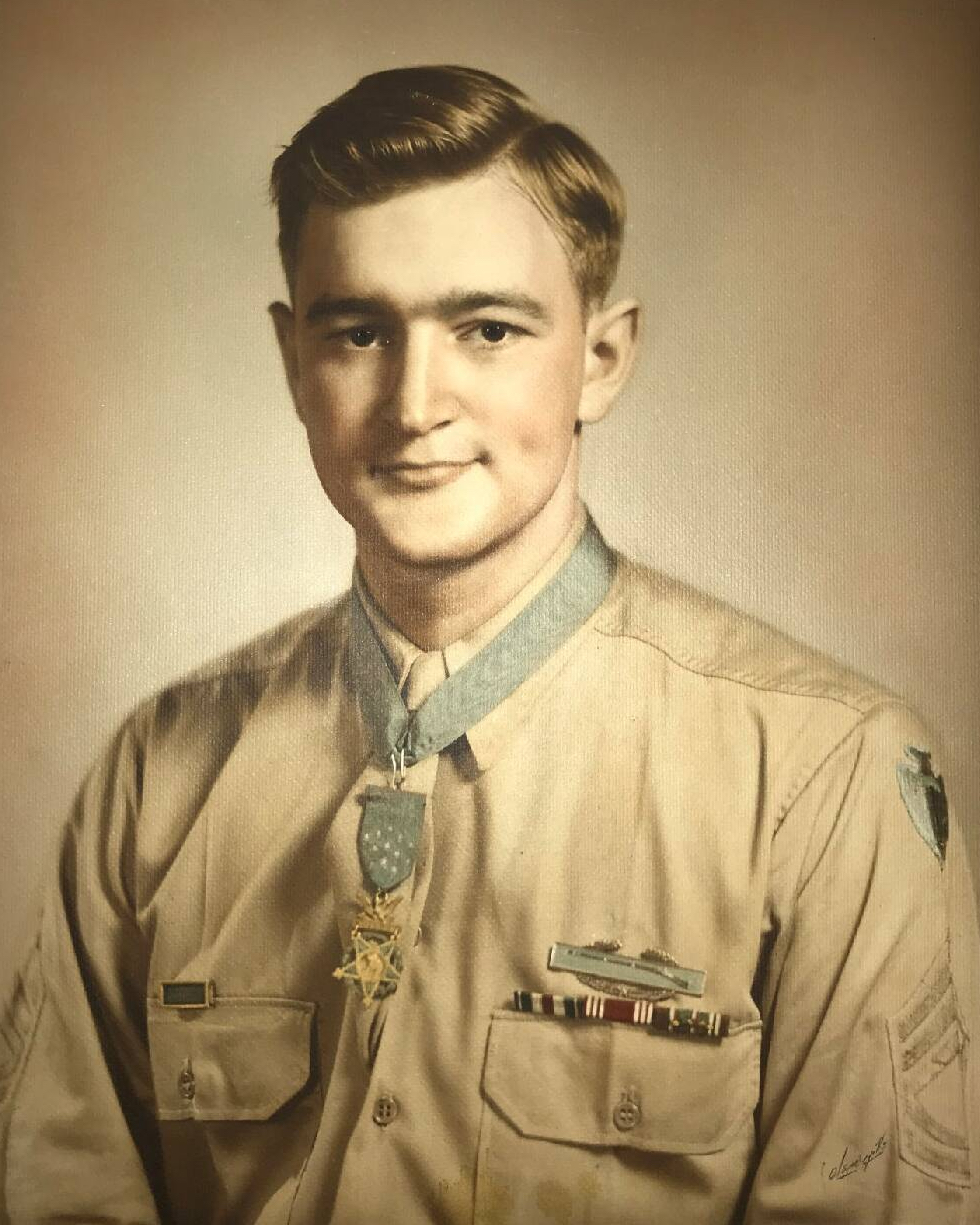
- Born: August 4, 1921; Signal Mountain, Tennessee, U.S.
- Died: April 6, 2021 (aged 99); Chattanooga, Tennessee, U.S.
- Burial place: Chattanooga National Cemetery
- Spouse: Frances Seepe (m. 1945; died 2009)
- Children: Charles H. Coolidge Jr. John Coolidge; William (Bill) Coolidge
- Military career
- Allegiance: United States
- Branch: United States Army
- Service years: 1942–1945
- Rank: Technical Sergeant
- Service number: 34286521
- Units: Company M, 3rd Battalion, 141st Infantry Regiment, 36th Infantry Division (United States)
- Conflicts: World War II
- Awards: Medal of Honor; Silver Star; Bronze Star Medal; Legion of Honour (France); Croix de Guerre (France)
- Other work: Bookbinder, printer

Charles Henry Coolidge (August 4, 1921 – April 6, 2021) was a United States Army technical sergeant and a recipient of the United States military's highest decoration for valor, the Medal of Honor, for his conspicuous gallantry and intrepidity in action above and beyond the call of duty in France during World War II.

At the time of his death, Coolidge was the last surviving Medal of Honor recipient from the European theater of World War II, as well as the last surviving recipient to have received the medal during the war (with Hershel W. Williams receiving the medal after the war on October 5, 1945).

== Early life ==
Coolidge was born in Signal Mountain, Tennessee, on August 4, 1921, the son of Walter and Grace (McCracken) Coolidge. He graduated from Chattanooga High School in 1939, and worked at his father's printing business (Chattanooga Printing & Engraving) as a bookbinder.

== World War II ==
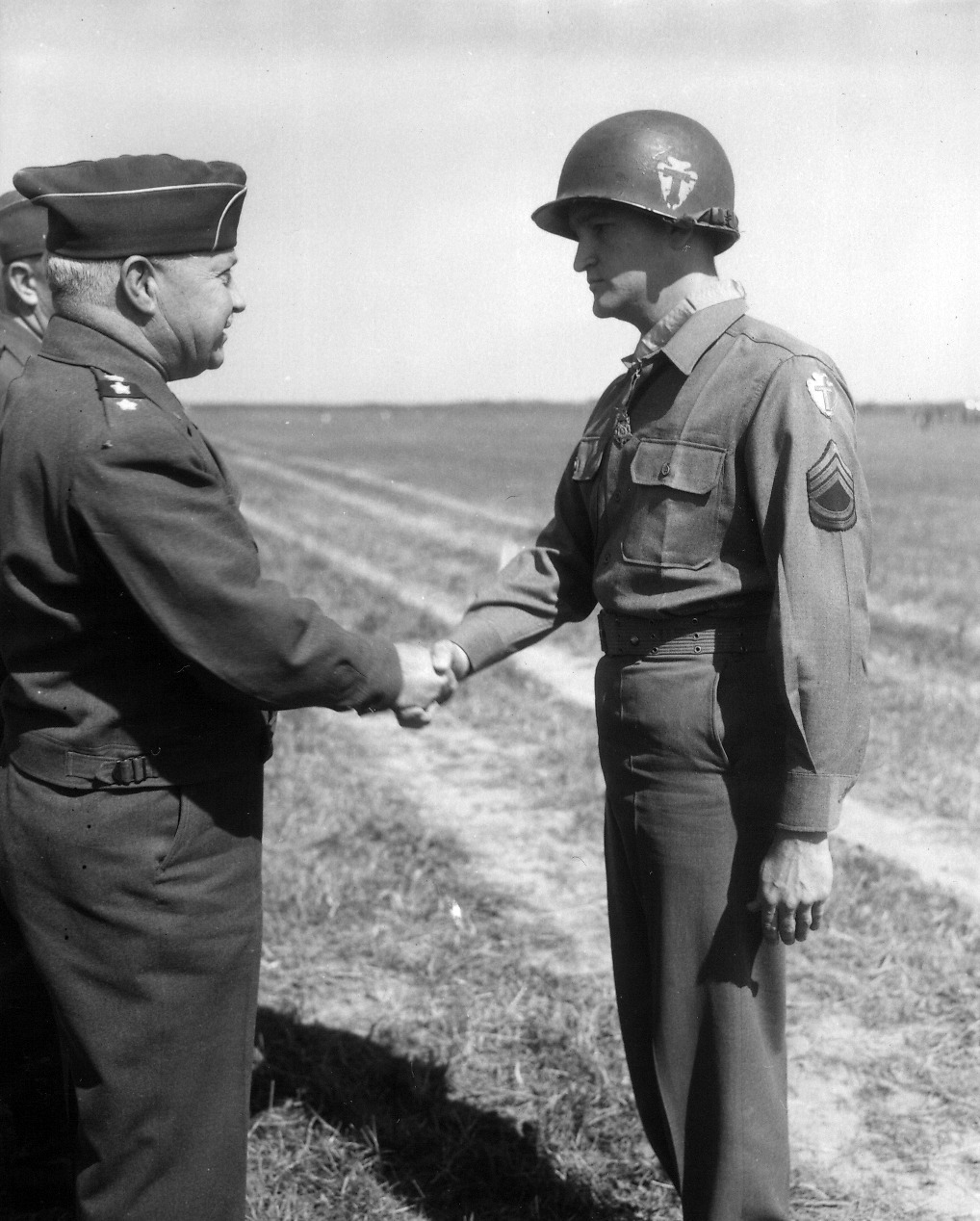
Lieutenant General Wade H. Haislip congratulates Coolidge after presenting him with the Medal of Honor.

Coolidge was drafted into the United States Army on June 16, 1942. He received basic training at Fort McClellan in Alabama. He was then sent to Camp Butner, North Carolina and Camp Edwards in Massachusetts, where he was assigned to M Company, 3rd Battalion, 141st Infantry Regiment, 36th "Texas" Infantry Division. In April 1943, his unit was shipped overseas to Oran in Algeria, and in September took part in the Salerno landings and then continued to fight in the first half of the Italian campaign. While serving as a machine gun section leader and sergeant, he was awarded the Silver Star for gallantry in action in Italy on May 31, 1944, shortly before the capture of Rome.

On October 24, 1944, Coolidge was a technical sergeant in charge of a group of machine-gunners and riflemen of M Company, who were to hold a vital hilltop position in France near the German border. During four days of attacks at Hill 623, east of Belmont-sur-Buttant in the Vosges Mountains in France, Coolidge and his group held off numerous enemy infantrymen, plus two tanks on October 27 using grenades. One tank unsuccessfully fired five separate rounds directly at Coolidge. For his actions above and beyond the call of duty during the battle, Coolidge was presented the Medal of Honor by Lieutenant General Wade H. Haislip during a ceremony at an airfield near Dornstadt, Germany on June 18, 1945.

== Post-war life ==
Coolidge resided near Chattanooga, Tennessee, where a highway and park have been named for him. For many years after the war, Coolidge went to work every day at the family business, Chattanooga Printing & Engraving, which celebrated its 100th anniversary in 2010. His son, Charles H. Coolidge Jr., is a retired lieutenant general of the United States Air Force. On September 15, 2006, Coolidge was awarded the Legion of Honour by officials of the French consulate at a ceremony in Coolidge Park (named in 1945).

Coolidge was inducted into the John Sevier Chapter of the Sons of the American Revolution in March 2015.

He was conferred with the George Marshall Award in March 2021, several weeks before his death.

== Personal life ==
Coolidge married Frances Seepe in 1945. They remained married for 64 years until her death in 2009. They had three children: Charles, William (Bill), and John.

Coolidge died on April 6, 2021, in Chattanooga at the age of 99. He had suffered from multiple sclerosis in the final 50+ years of his life. He was interred at Chattanooga National Cemetery beside his wife.

== Military awards ==
Coolidge's military awards and decorations include:

Combat Infantryman Badge
Medal of Honor
Silver Star	Bronze Star Medal	Army Good Conduct Medal
American Campaign Medal	European-African-Middle Eastern Campaign Medal with one arrowhead device one 3/16" silver star and two 3/16" bronze stars	World War II Victory Medal
Army of Occupation Medal	French Legion of Honour (Chevalier-Knight)	Croix de Guerre (with bronze Palm device)

Presidential Unit Citation Army Meritorious Unit Commendation

== Medal of Honor citation ==
Coolidge's official Medal of Honor citation reads:

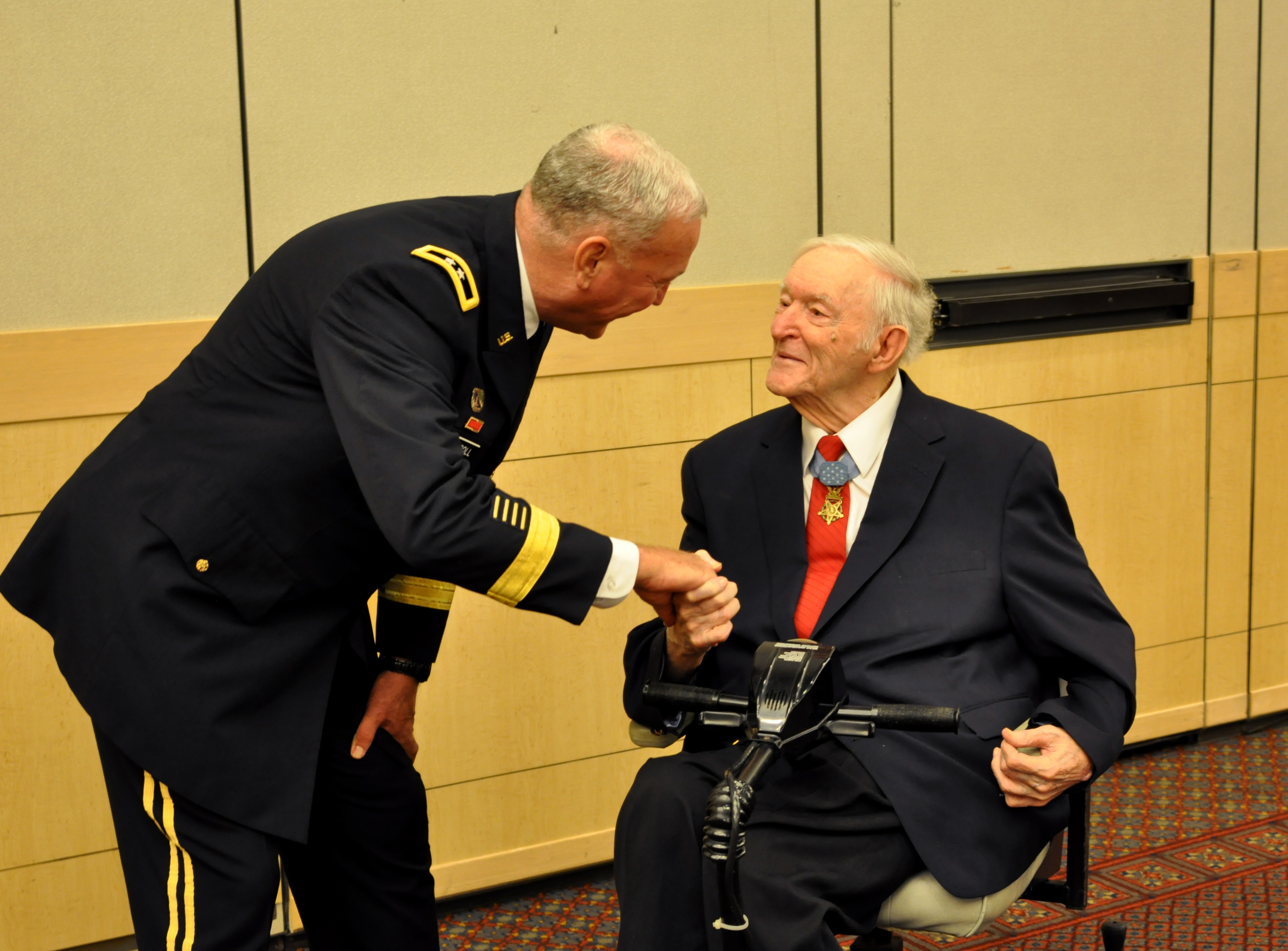
Coolidge in May 2014

Rank and organization: Technical Sergeant, U.S. Army, Company M, 141st Infantry, 36th Infantry Division
Place and date: East of Belmont sur Buttant, France, October 24–27, 1944
Entered service at: Signal Mountain, Tenn.
G.O. No. 53, July 1945

Leading a section of heavy machineguns supported by 1 platoon of Company K, he took a position near Hill 623, east of Belmont sur Buttant, France, on October 24, 1944, with the mission of covering the right flank of the 3d Battalion and supporting its action. T/Sgt. Coolidge went forward with a Sergeant of Company K to reconnoiter positions for coordinating the fires of the light and heavy machineguns. They ran into an enemy force in the woods estimated to be an infantry company. T/Sgt. Coolidge, attempting to bluff the Germans by a show of assurance and boldness called upon them to surrender, whereupon the enemy opened fire. With his carbine, T/Sgt. Coolidge wounded 2 of them. There being no officer present with the force, T/Sgt. Coolidge at once assumed command. Many of the men were replacements recently arrived; this was their first experience under fire. T/Sgt. Coolidge, unmindful of the enemy fire delivered at close range, walked along the position, calming and encouraging his men and directing their fire. The attack was thrown back. Through 25 and October 26, the enemy launched repeated attacks against the position of this combat group but each was repulsed due to T/Sgt. Coolidge's able leadership. On October 27, German infantry, supported by 2 tanks, made a determined attack on the position. The area was swept by enemy small arms, machinegun, and tank fire. T/Sgt. Coolidge armed himself with a bazooka and advanced to within 25 yards of the tanks. His bazooka failed to function and he threw it aside. Securing all the hand grenades he could carry, he crawled forward and inflicted heavy casualties on the advancing enemy. Finally it became apparent that the enemy, in greatly superior force, supported by tanks, would overrun the position. T/Sgt. Coolidge, displaying great coolness and courage, directed and conducted an orderly withdrawal, being himself the last to leave the position. As a result of T/Sgt. Coolidge's heroic and superior leadership, the mission of this combat group was accomplished throughout 4 days of continuous fighting against numerically superior enemy troops in rain and cold and amid dense woods.

== Other honors ==
- Upon his return from WWII, the mayor of Chattanooga, TN declared August 8, 1945 as "Coolidge Day."
- On 3 May 2013, Coolidge was awarded the Legion of Honor Life-Saving Medallion by The Chapel of Four Chaplains in recognition of having "saved the life of another at grave personal risk."
- In November 2013, Coolidge's was the first one of 12 portraits of Medal of Honor recipients on the cover sheet of a United States Postal Service "World War II Medal of Honor Forever Stamp" packet of 20 Medal of Honor stamps.
- The Charles H. Coolidge Medal of Honor Heritage Center in downtown Chattanooga, Tennessee, was named in his honor. It opened to the public in February 2020.
- Coolidge Park, located in downtown Chattanooga on the northshore waterfront, was named in his honor. The park features a restored 1894 Dentzel carousel, a pavilion, an interactive play fountain, the Outdoor Chattanooga Center and much open space. It is a popular destination for concerts, outdoor film screenings, festivals and special events.
- A nine-mile portion of U.S. Route 27 (Tennessee Route 29) in Hamilton County, Tennessee was renamed the Charles H. Coolidge Medal of Honor Highway and was dedicated in his honor on April 10, 1989.

== See also ==
- List of Medal of Honor recipients for World War II
