= Walter M. Robertson =

U.S. Army Major General

Walter Melville Robertson
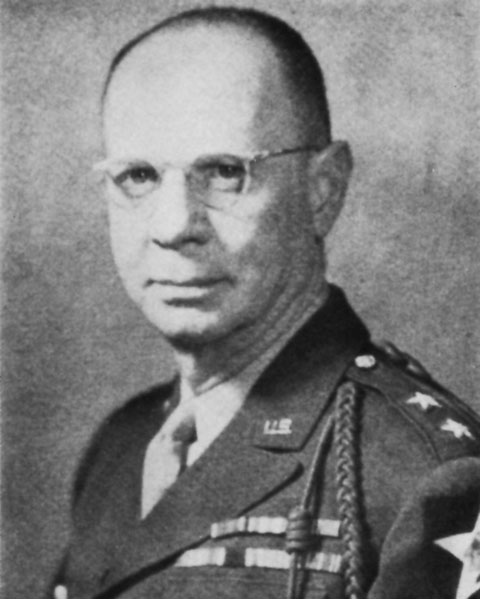
- Born: June 15, 1888; Nelson County, Virginia, United States
- Died: November 22, 1954 (aged 66); San Francisco, California, United States
- Burial place: Arlington National Cemetery, Virginia, United States
- Military career
- Allegiance: United States
- Branch: United States Army
- Service years: 1912–1950
- Rank: Major General
- Nickname: "Robby"
- Service number: 0-3378
- Unit: Infantry Branch
- Commands: 2nd Battalion, 31st Infantry Regiment; 9th Infantry Regiment; 2nd Infantry Division; XV Corps
- Conflicts: World War I World War II
- Awards: Distinguished Service Cross; Army Distinguished Service Medal (2); Silver Star; Bronze Star Medal

Major General Walter Melville Robertson (June 15, 1888 – November 22, 1954) was a senior United States Army officer. During World War II he received the second highest American military award, Distinguished Service Cross, for his leadership of the 2nd Infantry Division during the Battle of the Bulge in December 1944.

== Early military service ==
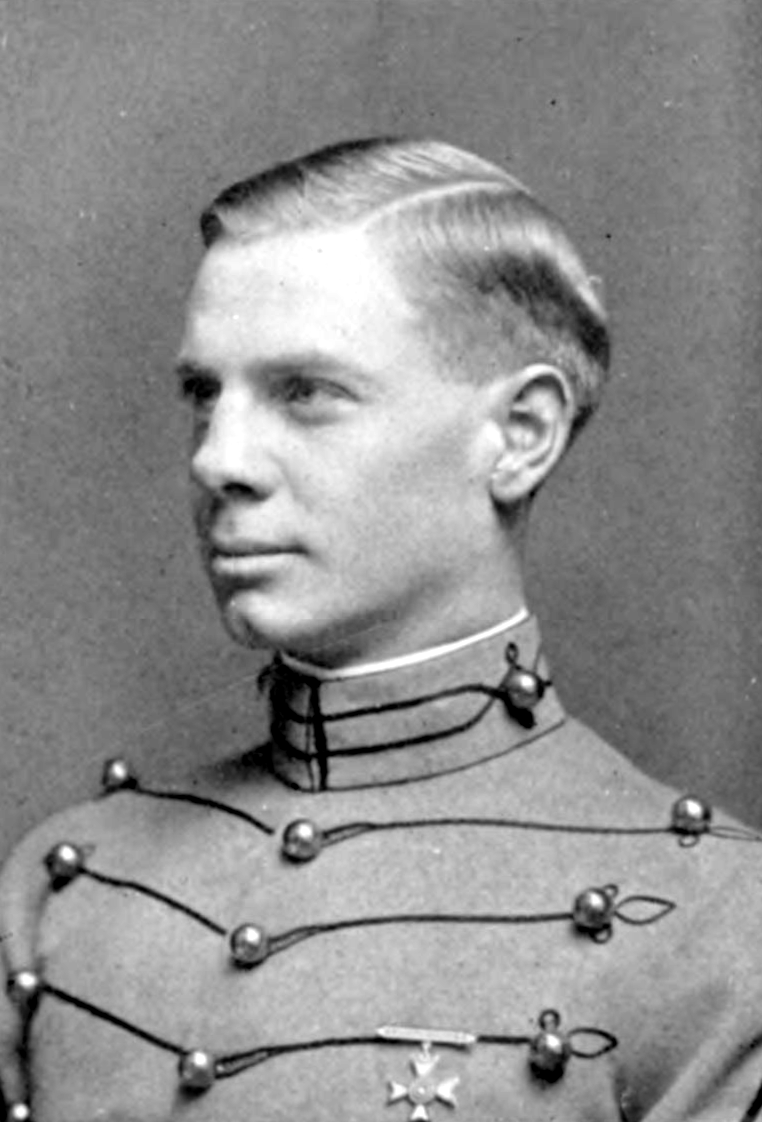
At West Point in 1912

Walter Melville Robertson was born on June 15, 1888, in Nelson County, Virginia, as the son of William Walter Robertson and his wife Mary Fannie (néé Pettit). He completed the Central State Normal School in Edmond, Oklahoma, in summer of 1907, then a preparatory school and subsequently enrolled the University of Oklahoma in Norman, Oklahoma, where he took a special work in engineering. In May 1908, Robertson interrupted his studies, when received an appointment to the United States Military Academy (USMA) at West Point, New York.

During his time at the Academy, he was nicknamed "Robby" by his classmates and was active in the track team, basketball squad and became an individual tennis champion during his time at the Academy. Robertson rose to the rank of Cadet Captain and graduated on June 12, 1912, with Bachelor of Science degree.

Upon his graduation, three days before his twenty-fourth birthday, Robertson was commissioned as a second lieutenant in the Infantry and ordered to Hawaii, where he joined the 1st Infantry Regiment at Schofield Barracks. He served with that unit until mid-1915, when he was ordered to the Presidio of San Francisco for service with the 24th Infantry Regiment.

In early 1916, Robertson was transferred to Fort Missoula, Montana, where he served for few months, before he was ordered to the newly established officer training school at Camp Bullis in Texas. Following the United States entry into World War I in April 1917, he served with the training units, before he embarked for France in May 1918. Robertson participated in combat operations on the Western Front in late 1918 and then took part in the occupation of the Rhineland until February 1920.

== Interwar period ==
Following his return stateside, Robertson was assigned to the Office of the Inspector General of the United States Army under Major general Eli A. Helmick and served in this capacity until May 1924, when he was ordered to the Advanced course at Army Infantry School at Fort Benning, Georgia. He completed the course one year later and entered another course at Army Command and General Staff College at Fort Leavenworth, Kansas.

Robertson graduated in June 1926 and assumed duty as an instructor at the Command and General Staff College. He served in this capacity until July 1929, when he was promoted to Major and ordered to the Army War College in Washington, D.C., for an instruction. Robertson graduated in May 1930 and then served again in the capacity of an instructor at that College until he was ordered for duty in the Philippines.

He was stationed at Fort William McKinley and served as Commanding officer, 2nd Battalion, 31st Infantry Regiment. Robertson was promoted to lieutenant colonel in August 1935 and was ordered back to the United States in June 1936. He then served briefly as Executive officer, 16th Infantry Regiment at Fort Jay, Governors Island, before he was transferred to the War Department General Staff for duty as Executive officer, Logistics Division.

Robertson served four years in that capacity, before he was ordered to the 23rd Infantry Regiment for duty as Executive officer in July 1940. He assumed command of 9th Infantry Regiment in November that year and remained in that capacity until the United States' entry into World War II, following an Attack on Pearl Harbor in December 1941.

== World War II ==
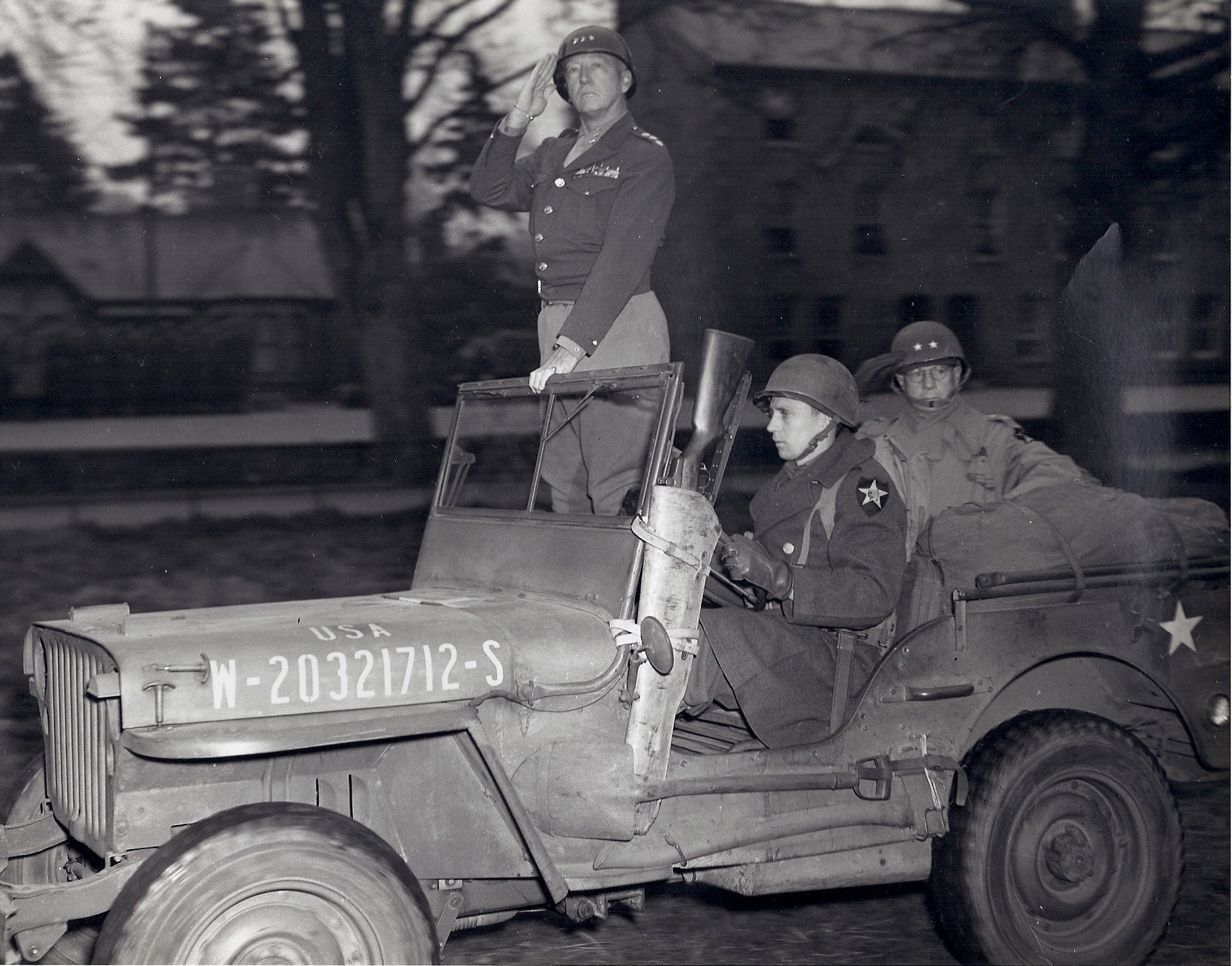
Robertson (back seat) with Lt. Gen. Patton pass in review of Third Army Troops in April 1944, prior to the Normandy invasion in June

Robertson was promoted to the temporary rank of Brigadier general on December 15, 1941, and ordered to the Louisiana Maneuvers area, where he assumed duty as Assistant Division Commander, 2nd Infantry Division under Major General John C. H. Lee. The Second Division conducted intensive training in order to prepare for combat deployment in Europe for several months, and Robertson relieved Lee in May 1942 when Lee was summoned to Washington by Army Chief of Staff General George C. Marshall to assume command of the Services of Supply, ETO. Robertson was promoted to the temporary rank of Major general on August 17, 1942.

After he assumed command, he led division during the four-month intensive training in winter warfare at Camp McCoy, Wisconsin, and embarked for England in October 1943. Robertson then led his division during another period of training in Northern Ireland and Wales and finally deployed to France on Omaha Beach on D-Day plus 1 (June 7, 1944) near Saint-Laurent-sur-Mer.

The Second Division went into its first World War II combat on June 10, 1944, and following the crossing of Aure River, the division liberated Trévières and proceeded to assault and secure Hill 192, a key enemy strong point on the road to Saint-Lô. After three weeks of fortifying the position, General Robertson ordered the assault on Hill 192, which was subsequently captured. After exploiting the Saint-Lo breakout, the 2nd Division then advanced across the Vire to take Tinchebray on August 15, 1944, and then raced toward Brest, the heavily defended port fortress which served as a major port for German U-boats.

Robertson led his division during the Battle for Brest, which lasted for 39 days and was present during the surrender of German garrison on September 19, 1944. The Second division was subsequently ordered to the defensive positions at St. Vith, Belgium, where it remained for two weeks. For his service in Normandy, Robertson received several decorations including Silver Star, Legion of Merit and Bronze Star Medal. He was also decorated with Legion of Honor and Croix de guerre 1939-1945 with Palm by the Government of France.

The German Ardennes offensive in mid-December forced the division to withdraw to defensive positions near Elsenborn Ridge, where the German drive was halted. When the initial thrusts of a full-scale German counter offensive threatened the right flank of his division, Robertson, fully aware of the urgency of the situation, personally assumed command of the defense of a vital road junction to delay the enemy long enough for his troops to take up defensive positions. Within an hour the first hostile tanks appeared 600 yards away and were immediately taken under fire on Robertson's orders.

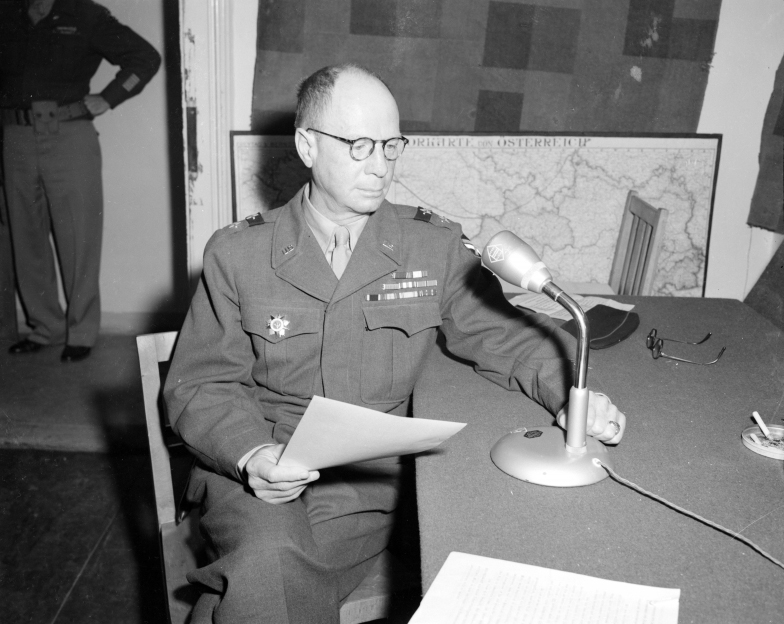
Robertson giving speech to the Salzburg Radio Rot-Weiß-Rot on June 6, 1945

Braving intense artillery and direct tank fire, he remained in complete observation of the enemy to supervise the disposition of his troops and to direct the fire of his own tanks and tank destroyers. After two hours of vicious fighting, many German tanks and vehicles were destroyed and the armored thrust in this sector was thwarted. As reinforcements arrived, Robertson proceeded immediately to a second critical area where another salient was threatening two villages along the main route of the enemy advance. He organized troops from his own command and stragglers from elements overrun by the powerful attack and, for a period of seven hours, heroically led them in deterring the advance.

Constantly exposed to intense fire from tanks, machine guns and small arms, Robertson, by his personal direction and his calm and collected demeanor, successfully rallied his men to hold their ground tenaciously. His presence among the foremost elements of his command, his exemplary courage and his self-assurance were primarily responsible for knitting the scattered troops into a cohesive fighting force and checking the forward drive of the enemy spearhead. For his gallant leadership, personal bravery and zealous devotion to duty, Robertson was decorated with Distinguished Service Cross, the second highest military decorations of the United States. The citation for the medal reads:

The President of the United States of America, authorized by Act of Congress, July 9, 1918, takes pleasure in presenting the Distinguished Service Cross to Major General Walter Melville Robertson (ASN: 0-3378), United States Army, for extraordinary heroism in connection with military operations against an armed enemy while Commanding the 2d Infantry Division, in action against enemy forces on 17 December 1944, in Belgium. When the initial thrusts of a full-scale German counter offensive threatened the right flank of his division, Major General Robertson, fully aware of the urgency of the situation, personally assumed command of the defense of a vital road junction to delay the enemy long enough for his troops to take up defensive positions. Within an hour the first hostile tanks appeared 600 yards away and were immediately taken under fire on Major General Robertson's orders. Braving intense artillery and direct tank fire, he remained in complete observation of the enemy to supervise the disposition of his troops and to direct the fire of his own tanks and tank destroyers. After two hours of vicious fighting, many German tanks and vehicles were destroyed and the armored thrust in this sector was thwarted. As reinforcements arrived, Major General Robertson proceeded immediately to a second critical area where another salient was threatening two villages along the main route of the enemy advance. He organized troops from his own command and stragglers from elements overrun by the powerful attack and, for a period of seven hours, heroically led them in deterring the advance. Constantly exposed to intense fire from tanks, machine guns and small arms, Major General Robertson, by his personal direction and his calm and collected demeanor, successfully rallied his men to hold their ground tenaciously. His presence among the foremost elements of his command, his exemplary courage and his self-assurance were primarily responsible for knitting the scattered troops into a cohesive fighting force and checking the forward drive of the enemy spearhead. Major General Robertson's gallant leadership, personal bravery and zealous devotion to duty exemplify the highest traditions of the military forces of the United States and reflect great credit upon himself, the 2d Infantry Division, and the United States Army.

Robertson was also appointed Honorary Companion of the Order of the Bath or received Order of the Crown, rank Commander and Croix de guerre with Palm by the Government of Belgium.

On March 4, 1945, the division captured Gemünd and reached the Rhine river five days later. Robertson and his division then advanced south to take Breisig, which it seized on March 11, and then participated in the guarding of the Remagen bridge, between March 12–20. He subsequently led his division further to Germany and participated in the capture of Göttingen, Merseburg or Leipzig.

The Second Division then advanced to Czechoslovakia on May 4, 1945, and liberated the city of Pilsen on VE Day. Robertson received the Army Distinguished Service Medal for his service with 2nd Infantry Division and was also decorated with the Order of the Patriotic War Second Class (Union of Soviet Socialist Republics), the Czechoslovak Order of the White Lion, 3rd Class and the Czechoslovak War Cross 1939-1945.

== Life after the War ==
In June, 1945, Major General Robertson was transferred to the XV Corps, where he replaced his West Point classmate, Lieutenant General Wade H. Haislip, as a corps commander. He served with the XV Corps as the part of Occupation forces in Austria and then in Germany. In March 1946, XV Corps was inactivated and Robertson was appointed Head of the US Delegation Allied Control Commission for Bulgaria. In this capacity, he led the U.S. team, which participated in the making of recommendations for Bulgaria as the defeated Axis country. Robertson stayed there until September 1947 and received a second Army Distinguished Service Medal for his service in this capacity, the citation for which reads:'

The President of the United States of America, authorized by Act of Congress July 9, 1918, takes pleasure in presenting a Bronze Oak Leaf Cluster in lieu of a Second Award of the Army Distinguished Service Medal to Major General Walter Melville Robertson (ASN: 0-3378), United States Army, for exceptionally meritorious and distinguished services to the Government of the United States, in a duty of great responsibility as U.S. Delegate to the Allied Control Commission for Bulgaria, from March 1946 to September 1947.

He was subsequently appointed a Deputy Commander of the Sixth Army under the command of General Mark W. Clark with headquarters at Fort Sam Houston, Texas, and served in this capacity until his retirement from the army on June 30, 1950.

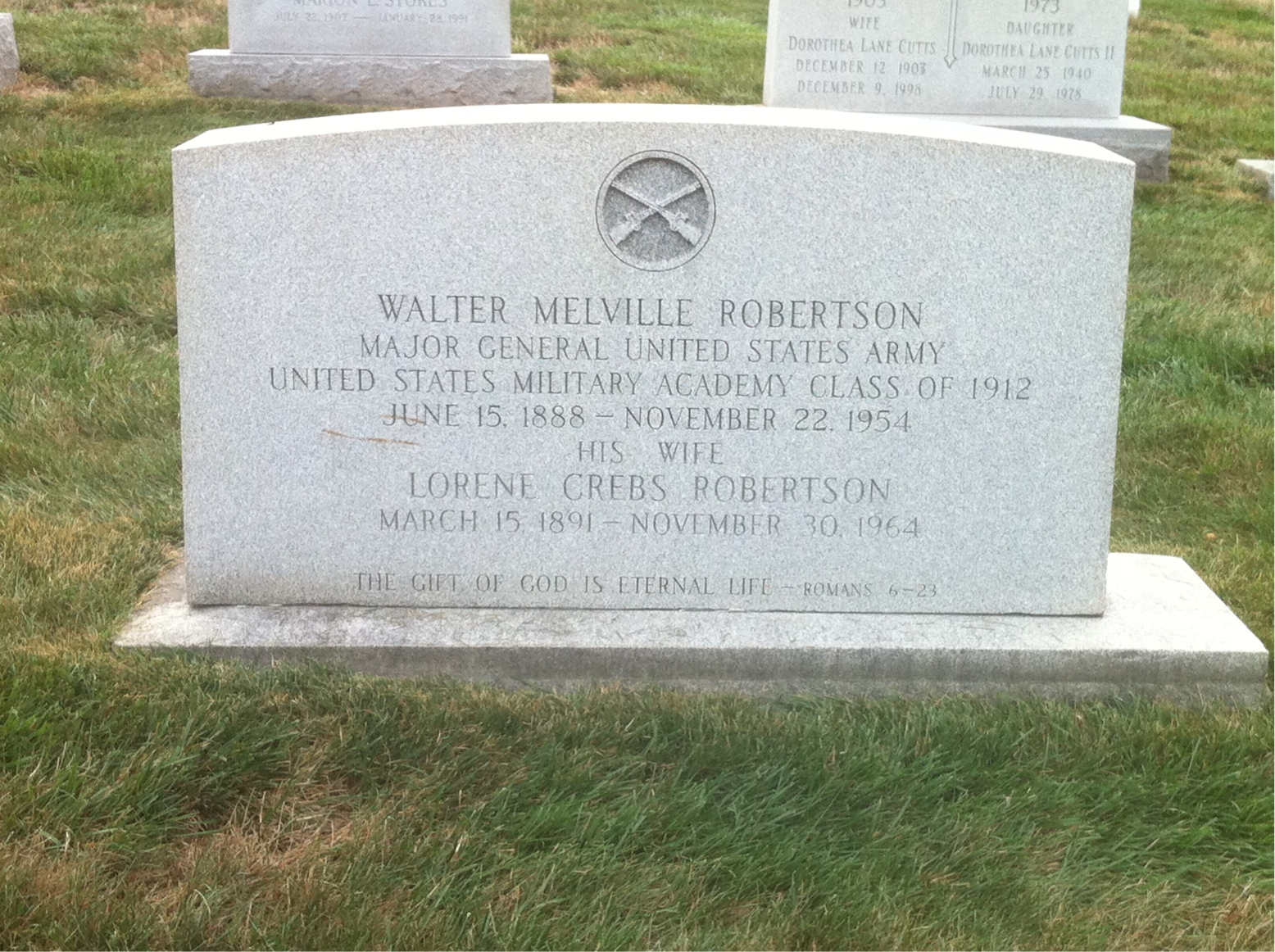
The grave of Major General Walter M. Robertson at Arlington National Cemetery

After retirement, Robertson was appointed a California State Director of Civil Defense with the seat in Sacramento. Robertson's nomination was opposed by unsuccessful gubernatorial candidate and highly decorated Marine officer, James Roosevelt, who described his nomination as nonentity and "no one has ever heard of General Robertson". Fortunately the Governor of California, Earl Warren, defended Robertson's appointment and said Roosevelt's remark that Robertson was a “nonentity” was wholly unjustified and indecent reference to one of the nation's most distinguished soldiers.

While in this position, Robertson was responsible for the administration of air raid shelters and gas masks, preparation of disaster relief plans, evacuation plans or Civil Defense drills. He held that office during the early years of the Cold War and Robertson's main task was to prepare the people of California for the possible atomic bomb attacks.

In October 1954, Robertson was accepted to the Letterman Army Hospital for a minor operation, and it was discovered that he had a serious abdominal condition, for which he submitted to an operation on November 9. Unfortunately post-operative complications followed and Robertson died on November 22, 1954, at the age of 66.

He was buried with full military honors at Arlington National Cemetery, Virginia. His honorary pallbearers were his West Point Classmates: Stephen J. Chamberlin, Roscoe C. Crawford, Wade H. Haislip, Robert M. Littlejohn and Sidney P. Spalding. Robertson's wife, Lorene Crebs (1891-1964) is buried beside him.

== Decorations ==
Here is Major General Robertson's ribbon bar:

1st Row	Distinguished Service Cross				
2nd Row	Army Distinguished Service Medal with Oak Leaf Cluster	Silver Star	Legion of Merit	Bronze Star Medal	Fourragère
3rd Row	World War I Victory Medal with three Battle Clasps	Army of Occupation of Germany Medal	American Defense Service Medal	American Campaign Medal	Fourragère
4th Row	European-African-Middle Eastern Campaign Medal with five 3/16 inch service stars	World War II Victory Medal	Army of Occupation Medal	National Defense Service Medal	Fourragère
5th Row	Honorary Companion of the Order of the Bath (United Kingdom)	Officer of the Legion of Honor (France)	French Croix de guerre 1939-1945 with Palm	Order of the Crown, rank Commander	Fourragère
6th Row	Belgian Croix de Guerre with Palm	Czechoslovak Order of the White Lion, 3rd Class	Czechoslovak War Cross 1939-1945	Order of the Patriotic War Second Class (Union of Soviet Socialist Republics)	Fourragère

Military offices
Preceded by John C. H. Lee	Commanding General 2nd Infantry Division; 1942–1945	Succeeded by William Kelly Harrison Jr.
Preceded by Wade H. Haislip	Commanding General XV Corps; 1945–1946	Succeeded by Post deactivated
