= Charles H. Coolidge Jr. =

American military officer

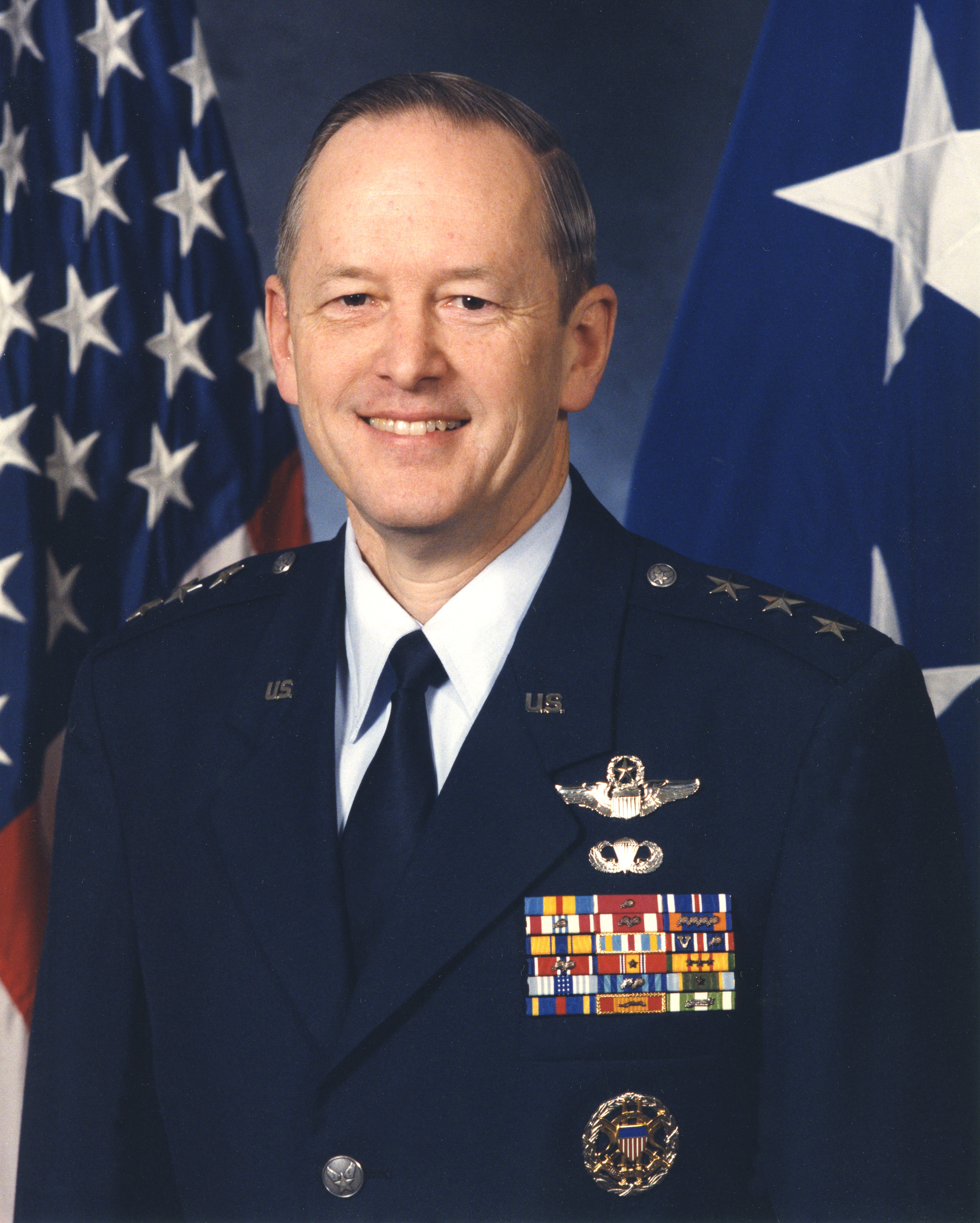
- Coolidge in the early 2000s as a lieutenant general
- Born: 1946 (age 79–80)
- Relatives: Charles H. Coolidge (father)
- Military career
- Allegiance: United States
- Branch: United States Air Force
- Service years: 1968–2004
- Rank: Lieutenant general
- Commands: 22nd Air Refueling Wing; 375th Airlift Wing; 301st Air Refueling Wing; 911th Air Refueling Squadron
- Conflicts: Vietnam War
- Awards: Defense Distinguished Service Medal; Air Force Distinguished Service Medal; Legion of Merit (2); Distinguished Flying Cross

Charles Henry Coolidge Jr. (born 1946) is a retired lieutenant general in the United States Air Force who served as vice commander of Air Force Materiel Command from 2000 to 2004. He graduated from the United States Air Force Academy in 1968. He is the son of Charles H. Coolidge, World War 2 Medal of Honor recipient.
