= William H. Wilbur =

United States Army general (1888–1979)

William Hale Wilbur
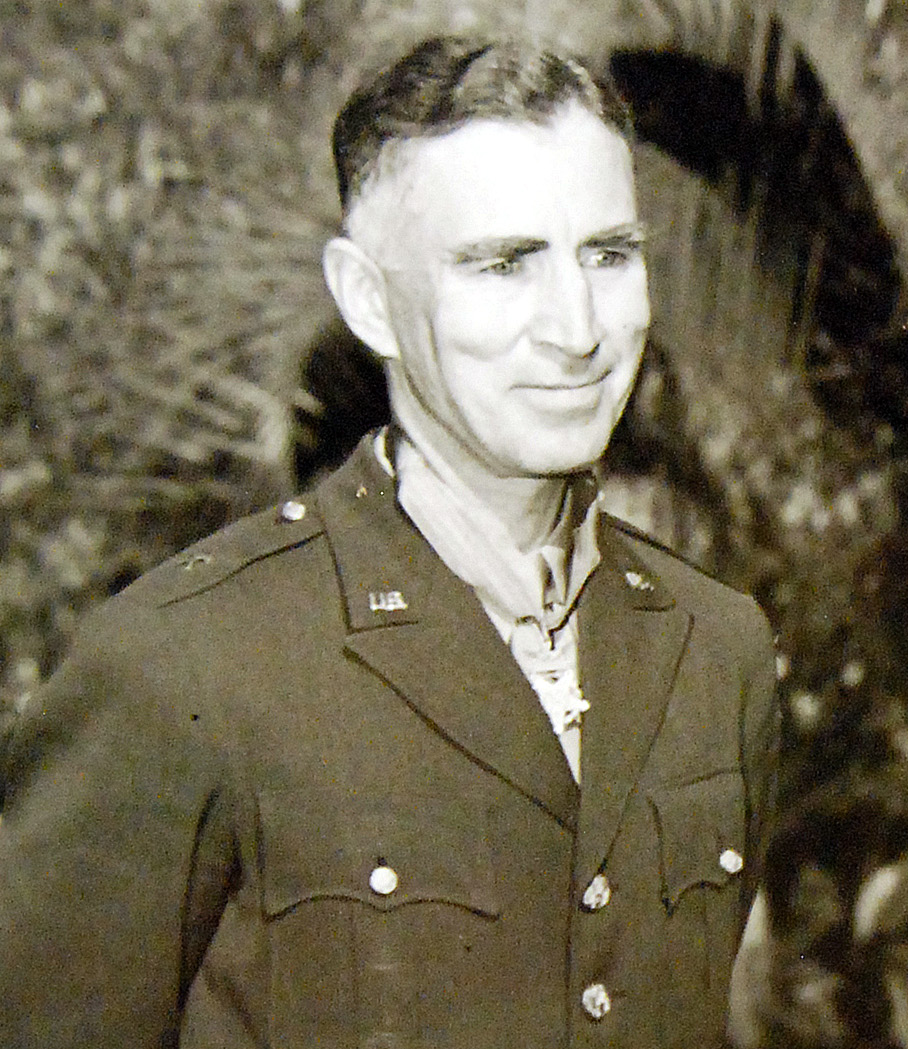
- Wilbur in January 1943
- Born: September 24, 1888; Palmer, Massachusetts
- Died: December 27, 1979 (aged 91); Fort Myers, Florida
- Burial place: West Point Cemetery
- Military career
- Allegiance: United States of America
- Branch: United States Army
- Service years: 1912–1947
- Rank: Brigadier General
- Nickname: Bill
- Commands: 60th Infantry Regiment; 1st Battalion, 35th Infantry Regiment
- Conflicts: World War I World War II; *Operation Torch
- Awards: Medal of Honor; Silver Star; Bronze Star; Legion of Merit (2); Combat Infantryman Badge
- Other work: Law Enforcement, Warden and a member of the Chicago Crime Commission

William Hale Wilbur (September 24, 1888 – December 27, 1979) was a United States Army officer and a recipient of the United States military's highest decoration—the Medal of Honor—for his actions in World War II.

== Early life and military service ==
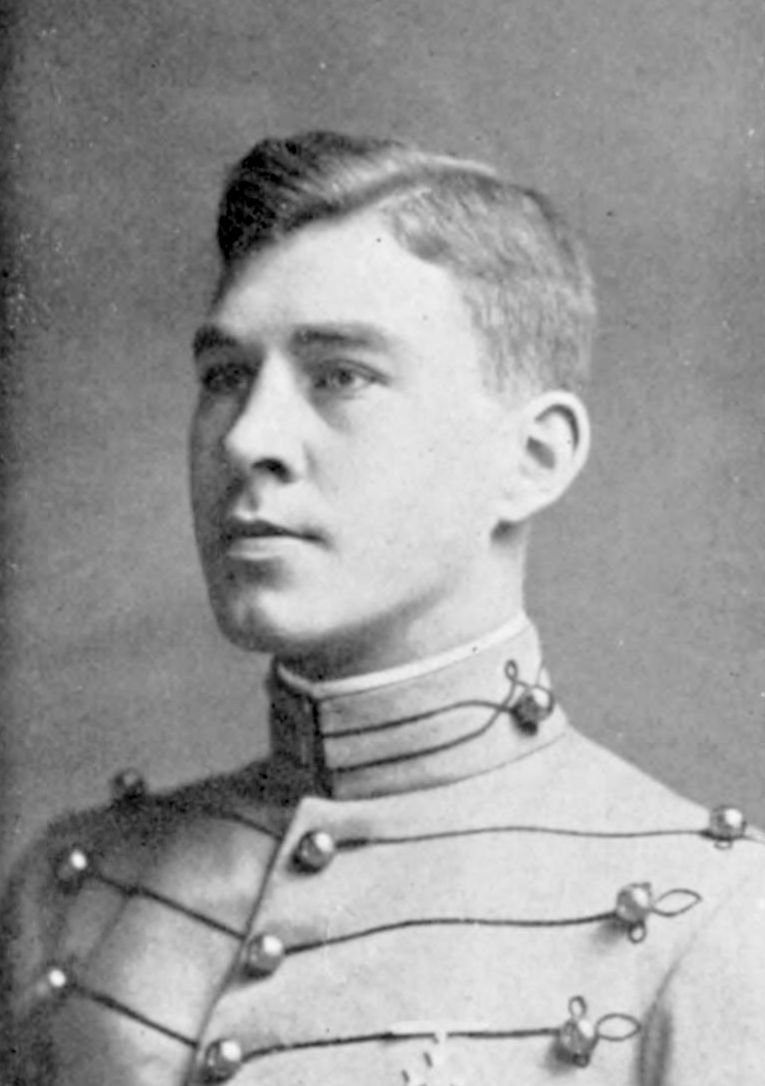
At West Point in 1912

Wilbur was born September 24, 1888, in Palmer, Massachusetts. He graduated 25th in a class of 95 from the United States Military Academy at West Point in June 1912 and joined the Army from his birth city of Palmer, Massachusetts. After being commissioned, he spent three years in Panama and then three years as an instructor at West Point. In June 1918, Wilbur was promoted to major in the American Expeditionary Forces and sent to France, where he saw combat in World War I and commanded a battalion. Before returning to the United States, he attended the French military academy École spéciale militaire de Saint-Cyr as a classmate of Charles de Gaulle, graduating in 1920.

After teaching at the Infantry School, Wilbur was sent back to France in 1922 to study at the École supérieure de guerre, graduating in 1924. He later graduated from the Infantry School Advanced Course in 1927 and the Command and General Staff School in 1932. After graduating from the Army War College in 1935, Wilbur was promoted to lieutenant colonel.

From 1935 to 1938, Wilbur served in Hawaii, where he commanded the 1st Battalion, 35th Infantry for two years. Promoted to colonel in November 1940, he commanded the 60th Infantry Regiment from 1941 to 1942.

On November 8, 1942, Wilbur participated in Operation Torch, the Allied invasion of French North Africa. He served on the staff of Major General George S. Patton as part of the Western Task Force, charged with capturing the city of Casablanca, Morocco, from the Vichy French forces. Several American officers, including Wilbur, were chosen to carry messages to French commanders who were believed to be sympathetic towards the Allies. Wilbur was to contact Admiral François Michelier, commander of the French naval forces in Casablanca, and deliver to him a letter from General Patton. The Allies hoped to gain assistance from these French commanders, or at least convince them to lay down their arms and not oppose the invasion.

After landing with the first assault wave in Fedala, Wilbur approached the French lines under a white flag of truce and was escorted to their division headquarters. Finding that his intermediate contact there had been arrested for treason, he attempted to give the letter to the presiding general. The general refused to accept it, so Wilbur placed the letter on the man's desk and left. Before reaching his vehicle, he was stopped by another officer who offered to take him to Admiral Michelier. Upon arriving at the admiral's headquarters, he was turned away; Michelier refused to meet with him. Wilbur headed back to the American lines in Fedala.

After arriving back at the Allied-held beachhead, Wilbur led an attack against a French artillery battery. One of the few French guns still firing in the area, the battery was targeting Allied ships off shore. Wilbur gathered four tanks and a company of infantry to assault the position. He personally accompanied the group, riding along on the lead tank, and commanded them in the successful capture of the battery.

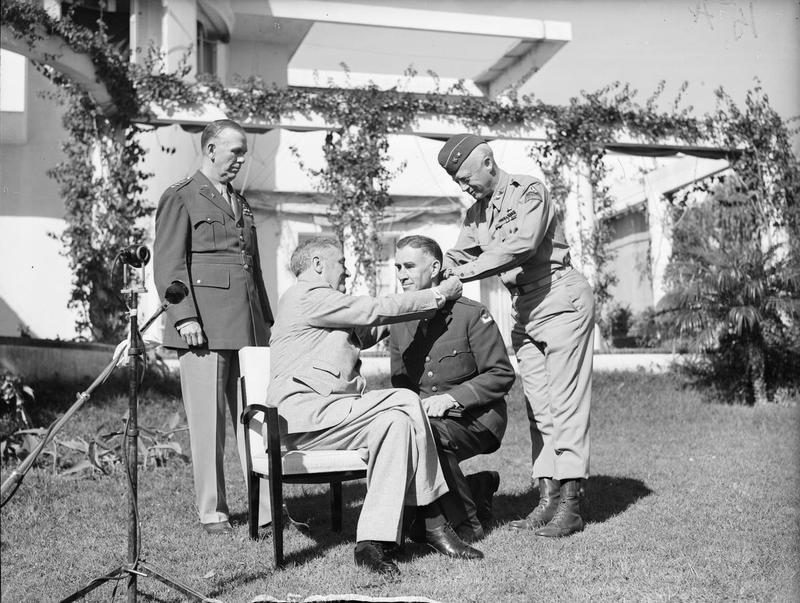
Wilbur receiving the Medal of Honor from President Franklin Roosevelt. General Patton at right, General Marshall at back left.

Wilbur was promoted to brigadier general effective December 1, 1942 and approved for the Medal of Honor on January 13, 1943. The medal was presented to him by President Franklin D. Roosevelt during a ceremony in Casablanca on January 22, 1943, in the midst of the Casablanca Conference. Also in attendance were General George Marshall, the Chief of Staff of the United States Army, and Major General Patton. It was the first time that a U.S. President conferred the Medal of Honor to an American soldier on foreign soil.

Wilbur continued to serve for the remainder of the war. He succeeded Brigadier General Otto F. Lange as the assistant division commander (ADC) of the 36th Infantry Division during the first five months of the Italian campaign, he participated in the Allied landings in Salerno and the subsequent fighting through the winter of 1943-1944, before himself being replaced by Brigadier General Robert I. Stack in February 1944. He was then stationed in east Asia before retiring from the Army in 1947.

== Later life ==
A strong anti-communist, Wilbur became involved in the political discourse regarding the Korean War. South Korean president Syngman Rhee had offered him an official advisory post before the war, but he declined the position. In 1950, his son, Army Lieutenant William H. Wilbur, Jr., was killed in Korea and posthumously awarded the Army's second-highest honor, the Distinguished Service Cross. Wilbur was a vocal supporter of then-Presidential candidate Dwight D. Eisenhower's plan to withdraw American troops from Korea, giving several speeches on the topic in 1952.

He was also involved in law enforcement, serving on the Chicago Crime Commission and briefly as warden of the Cook County Jail. He authored several non-fiction books, including The Making of George Washington (1973, ISBN 978-0-912530-02-4) and Freedom Must Not Perish (1964).

He died at age 91 and was buried in the West Point Cemetery on the grounds of his alma mater, the United States Military Academy.

== Medal of Honor citation ==
His official Medal of Honor citation reads:

For conspicuous gallantry and intrepidity in action above and beyond the call of duty. Col. Wilbur prepared the plan for making contact with French commanders in Casablanca and obtaining an armistice to prevent unnecessary bloodshed. On 8 November 1942, he landed at Fedala with the leading assault waves where opposition had developed into a firm and continuous defensive line across his route of advance. Commandeering a vehicle, he was driven toward the hostile defenses under incessant fire, finally locating a French officer who accorded him passage through the forward positions. He then proceeded in total darkness through 16 miles of enemy-occupied country intermittently subjected to heavy bursts of fire, and accomplished his mission by delivering his letters to appropriate French officials in Casablanca. Returning toward his command, Col. Wilbur detected a hostile battery firing effectively on our troops. He took charge of a platoon of American tanks and personally led them in an attack and capture of the battery. From the moment of landing until the cessation of hostile resistance, Col. Wilbur's conduct was voluntary and exemplary in its coolness and daring.

== Contributions ==
One of his greatest contributions was researching and writing about the childhood and upbringing of George Washington. The book is called The Making of George Washington, and he wrote it "because the world needs Washington again."

== See also ==
- List of Medal of Honor recipients for World War II
