= Wade H. Haislip =

US Army general (1889–1971)

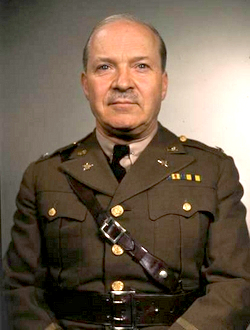
- Born: 9 July 1889; Woodstock, Virginia, United States
- Died: 23 December 1971 (aged 82); Walter Reed Army Medical Center, Washington, D.C., United States
- Burial place: Arlington National Cemetery, Arlington, United States
- Military career
- Allegiance: United States
- Branch: United States Army
- Service years: 1912–1951
- Rank: General
- Nickname: "Ham"
- Service number: O-3374
- Unit: Infantry Branch
- Commands: 85th Infantry Division; XV Corps; Seventh Army; Vice Chief of Staff of the United States Army
- Conflicts: Pancho Villa Expedition; World War I World War II
- Awards: Army Distinguished Service Medal (4); Legion of Merit; Bronze Star (2)
- Other work: Governor, Soldiers Home

General Wade Hampton Haislip (9 July 1889 – 23 December 1971) was a senior United States Army officer who served in both World War I and World War II, where he led XV Corps on the Western Front from 1944 to 1945. He later became a four-star general, serving as Vice Chief of Staff of the United States Army (VCSA) from 1949 to 1951.

== Military career ==
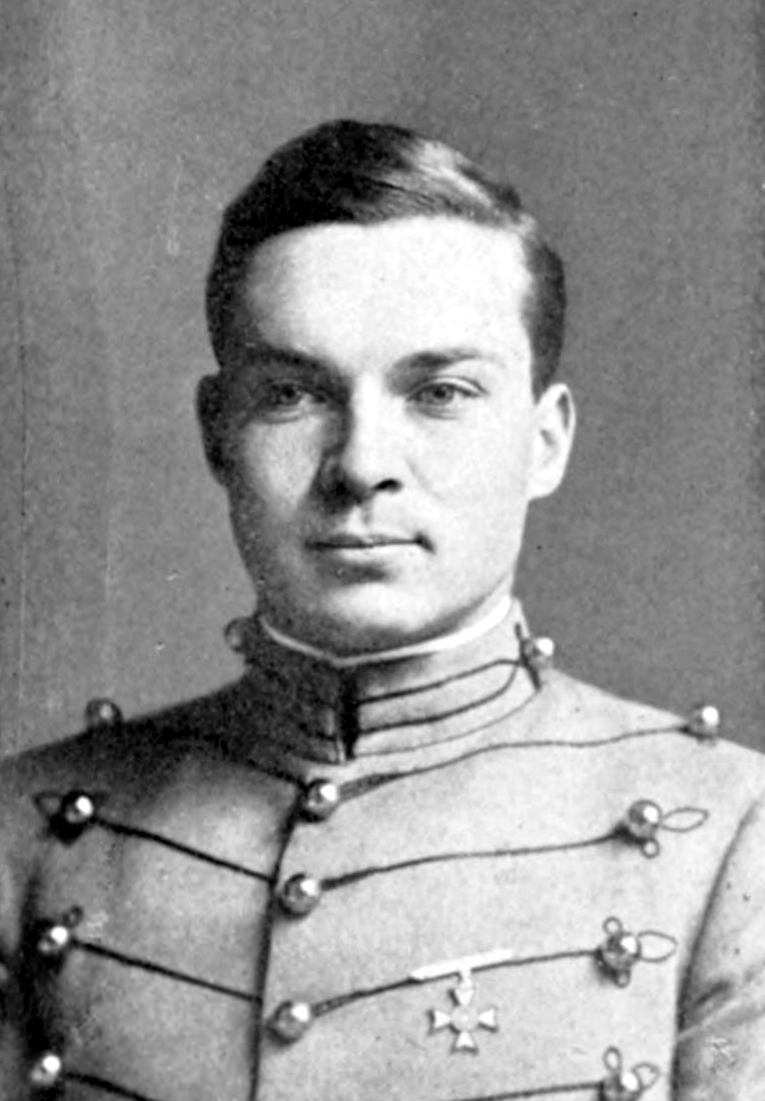
At West Point in 1912

Haislip was born in Woodstock, Virginia, on 9 July 1889, and moved at age two to Staunton, Virginia. He was commissioned a second lieutenant of infantry upon graduating from the United States Military Academy at West Point in 1912.

Haislip served in Vera Cruz, Mexico, in 1914 after the Tampico Affair. From 1917 to 1921, he served with the American Expeditionary Forces, first in World War I, then in the occupation of Germany. During his time overseas his assignments included being on the General Staff of V Corps; Division Machine Gun Officer for the 3rd Division, and General Staff, U.S. Forces in Germany. During World War I he participated in the Battle of Saint-Mihiel and the Meuse–Argonne Offensive.

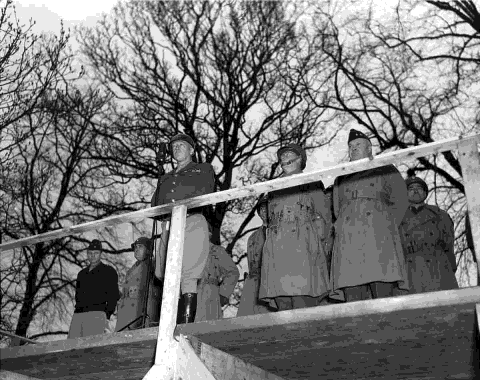
Lieutenant General George S. Patton delivering an address, quite possibly his famous speech, to men of the 2nd Infantry Division, at Armagh, Northern Ireland, 1 April 1944. In the front are Patton, Major General Walter M. Robertson, and Major General Wade H. Haislip. In the back far left is Brigadier General Hobart R. Gay.

He returned to West Point as an instructor from 1921 to 1923. He next attended a series of schools, beginning with the U.S. Army Infantry School from 1923 to 1924, then the Command and General Staff School from 1924 to 1925, and finally going back overseas to attend the French École supérieure de guerre from 1925 to 1927. He returned to the United States as assistant executive in the office of Assistant Secretary of War from 1928 to 1931, followed by the Army War College from 1931 to 1932, and an assignment as an instructor at the Command and General Staff School from 1932 to 1936.

Prior to World War II he held a series of staff assignments, including time in the Budget and Legislative Planning Branch of the War Department General Staff from 1938 to 1941, and Assistant Chief-of-Staff for personnel.

In World War II he served very briefly as assistant division commander (ADC) of the 4th Infantry Division. He organized the 85th Infantry Division and served as commander from April 1942 to February 1943 until he was succeeded by Brigadier General John B. Coulter, his ADC. He next took command of XV Corps and served with it through Normandy, France, Rhineland, and Central Europe campaigns. He became commander of Seventh United States Army, and was in that billet when World War II ended in August 1945.

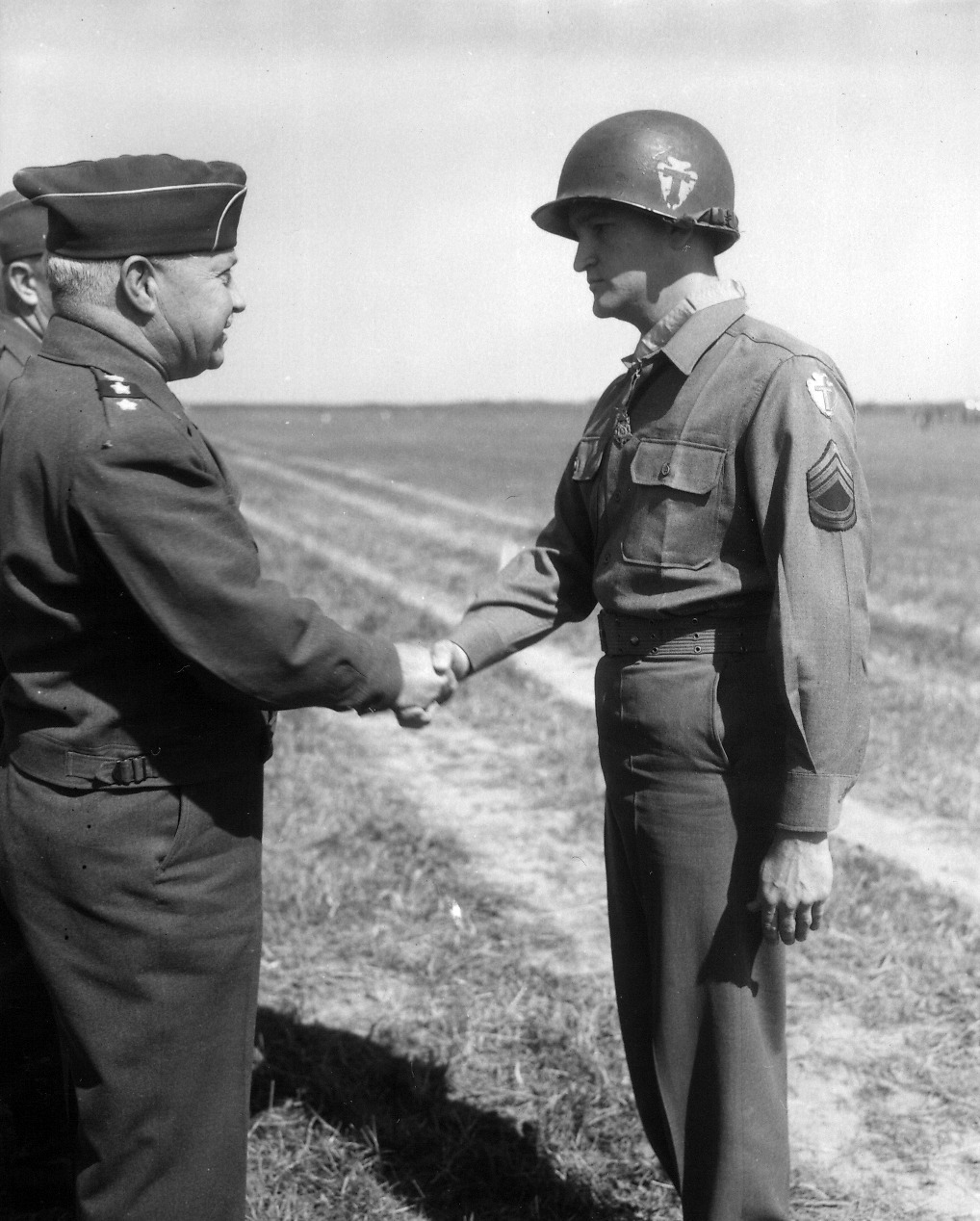
Lieutenant General Wade H. Haislip congratulates Technical Sergeant Charles H. Coolidge after presenting him with the Medal of Honor, Germany, 18 June 1945

Following the war he was on the Secretary of War's Personnel Board from September 1945 to April 1946, and a senior member of the Chief-of-Staff's Advisory Group from 1946 to 1948. Prior to his selection in 1949 as Vice Chief of Staff he was Deputy Chief-of-Staff for administration, 1948–49. He retired in 1951.

Haislip is responsible for introducing Dwight D. Eisenhower to Mamie Doud. Eisenhower was a second lieutenant and Haislip a first lieutenant at Fort Sam Houston at the time. At Eisenhower's funeral, he served as a pall-bearer.

=== Major assignments ===
- Assistant Chief-of-Staff for personnel – 9 February 1941 to 19 January 1942
- Assistant Division Commander, 4th Motorized Division – 20 January 1942 to 9 March 1942
- Commander, 85th Infantry Division – 9 March 1942 to 22 February 1943
- Commander, XV Corps – 23 February 1943 to 1 June 1945
- Commander, Seventh United States Army – 2 June 1945 to 7 September 1945
- President, Secretary of War's Personnel Board – September 1945 to 30 April 1946
- Senior member of the Chief-of-Staff's Advisory Group – 15 May 1946 to 1 June 1948
- Special Assistant to the Chief-of-Staff, U.S. Army – 1 June 1948 to 15 November 1948
- Deputy Chief-of-Staff for Administration – 15 November 1948 to 23 August 1949
- Vice Chief of Staff of the United States Army – 23 August 1949 to 31 July 1951

== Post military career ==
After retiring from active duty in 1951, Haislip went on to become Governor of the Soldier's Home in Washington, D.C., a position he filled from 1951 to 1966.

Haislip died on 23 December 1971, at Walter Reed Army Medical Center after suffering a stroke, and was buried in Arlington National Cemetery. His wife, the former Alice Jennings Shepherd (1897–1987), whom he had married on 14 July 1932, was later buried beside him.

== Dates of rank ==
Insignia	Rank	Component	Date
No insignia	Cadet	United States Military Academy	2 March 1908
No insignia in 1912	Second lieutenant	Regular Army	12 June 1912
	First lieutenant	Regular Army	1 July 1916
	Captain	Regular Army	15 May 1917
	Major	National Army	7 June 1918
	Lieutenant colonel	National Army	6 May 1919
	Captain	Regular Army	10 March 1920
	Major	Regular Army	1 July 1920
	Lieutenant colonel	Regular Army	1 August 1935
	Colonel	Army of the United States	16 November 1940
	Brigadier general	Army of the United States	29 January 1941
	Colonel	Regular Army	1 February 1942
	Major general	Army of the United States	9 March 1942
	Brigadier general	Regular Army	3 June 1944
	Lieutenant general	Army of the United States	15 April 1945
	Major general	Regular Army	1 July 1947
	General	Army of the United States	1 October 1949
	General	Retired List	31 July 1951

== Bibliography ==
- Taaffe, Stephen R. (2013). Marshall and His Generals: U.S. Army Commanders in World War II. Lawrence, Kansas: University Press of Kansas. ISBN 978-0-7006-1942-9. OCLC 840162019.

Military offices
Preceded by New post	Commanding General 85th Infantry Division; 1942–1943	Succeeded by John B. Coulter
Preceded by New post	Commanding General XV Corps; 1943–1945	Succeeded by Walter M. Robertson
Preceded by Alexander Patch	Commanding General Seventh Army; June–August 1945	Succeeded by Geoffrey Keyes
Preceded by J. Lawton Collins	Vice Chief of Staff of the United States Army; 1949–1951	Succeeded by John E. Hull
