= Russ Method =

American football player (1897–1971)

- December 1, 1929 (Chicago Cardinals vs. New York Giants)

No. 2, 17, 9
- Position: Back

Personal information
- Born: June 27, 1897; Duluth, Minnesota, U.S.
- Died: September 17, 1971 (aged 74); Two Harbors, Minnesota, U.S.
- Listed height: 5 ft 10 in (1.78 m)
- Listed weight: 192 lb (87 kg)

Career information
- High school: Denfeld (Duluth, Minnesota)
- College: None

Career history
- Duluth Kelleys/Eskimos (1923–1927); Chicago Cardinals (1929)
- Stats at Pro Football Reference

Russell G. Method (June 27, 1897 – September 17, 1971) was an American professional football player who played six seasons in the National Football League (NFL) with the Duluth Kelleys/Eskimos and Chicago Cardinals. He attended Denfeld High School in Duluth, Minnesota. He did not play college football.

== Early life ==
Russell G. Method was born on June 27, 1897, in Duluth, Minnesota. He attended Denfeld High School in Duluth. He did not play college football.

== Professional career ==
Method signed with the Duluth Kelleys of the National Football League (NFL) in 1923. He played in seven games, starting six, for the Kelleys during his rookie year in 1923. The team finished the season with a 4–3 record in NFL games, good for seventh place in the league. He appeared in five games, starting four, in 1924, and scored one rushing touchdown. Method played in three games, starting two, in 1925. He appeared in 12 games, starting 11, for the newly-renamed Duluth Eskimos during the 1926 season and returned one interception for a touchdown. The Eskimos finished with a 6–5–3 record in league games that season, good for eighth place in the NFL. He played in eight games, starting five, in 1927 and scored one receiving touchdown.

Method signed with the NFL's Chicago Cardinals in 1929. He appeared in ten games, starting six, for the Cardinals during the 1929 season. The team finished the year in fourth place in the NFL with a 6–6–1 record in league games.

== Personal life ==
Method died on September 17, 1971, in Two Harbors, Minnesota.
