= James E. Robinson Jr. =

United States Army Medal of Honor recipient

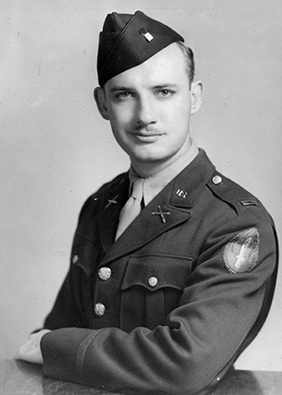
- Robinson in 1943
- Born: July 10, 1918; Toledo, Ohio, US
- Died: April 6, 1945 (aged 26) near Neuenstadt am Kocher, Germany
- Burial place: Fort Sam Houston National Cemetery, San Antonio, Texas
- Military career
- Allegiance: United States of America
- Branch: United States Army
- Service years: 1937–1945
- Rank: First Lieutenant
- Units: 861st Field Artillery Battalion, 63rd Infantry Division
- Conflicts: World War II: Battle of Buchhof and Stein am Kocher †
- Awards: Medal of Honor; Purple Heart; Croix de Guerre

James E. Robinson Jr. (July 10, 1918 – April 6, 1945) was a United States Army officer and a recipient of the United States military's highest decoration—the Medal of Honor—for his actions in World War II near Neuenstadt am Kocher, Germany in 1945.

== Biography ==
Robinson joined the Army from Waco, Texas in 1937. He attended artillery school in 1943, and was commissioned a second lieutenant. By April 6, 1945 he was serving as a first lieutenant in Battery A, 861st Field Artillery Battalion, 63rd Infantry Division. At the time of the Battle of Buchhof and Stein am Kocher near Untergriesheim, Germany, he was attached as a forward artillery observer to "A" Company, 1st Battalion, 253rd Infantry. During the assault on a tactically-important ridge he called accurate artillery adjustments that aided A company in advancing on the ridge. But during the assault, "A" company suffered heavy casualties, including all officers and most non-commissioned officers. Robinson assumed command of the demoralized remnant, then numbering only 23 men. He led them in successfully taking the ridge from entrenched elements of the German 17th SS Panzer Division, personally clearing several foxholes of German infantrymen, killing all ten with rifle and handgun fire. He then received orders to take the town of Kressbach. During this assault, Robinson's larynx was lacerated by fragmentation. Although severely wounded, he refused medical attention, continued the assault, and continued calling artillery adjustments until the objective had been taken. Once the objective was secured, he walked 3000 meters back to the aid station. He was evacuated to the rear, and died of his wounds on the operating table later that day. He was posthumously awarded the Medal of Honor on December 11, 1945.

In 1948, he was awarded the French Croix de Guerre.

== Medal of Honor citation ==
First Lieutenant Robinson's official Medal of Honor citation reads:

He was a field artillery forward observer attached to Company A, 253d Infantry, near Untergriesheim, Germany, on 6 April 1945. Eight hours of desperate fighting over open terrain swept by German machinegun, mortar, and small-arms fire had decimated Company A, robbing it of its commanding officer and most of its key enlisted personnel when 1st Lt. Robinson rallied the 23 remaining uninjured riflemen and a few walking wounded, and, while carrying his heavy radio for communication with American batteries, led them through intense fire in a charge against the objective. Ten German infantrymen in foxholes threatened to stop the assault, but the gallant leader killed them all at point-blank range with rifle and pistol fire and then pressed on with his men to sweep the area of all resistance. Soon afterward he was ordered to seize the defended town of Kressbach. He went to each of the 19 exhausted survivors with cheering words, instilling in them courage and fortitude, before leading the little band forward once more. In the advance he was seriously wounded in the throat by a shell fragment, but, despite great pain and loss of blood, he refused medical attention and continued the attack, directing supporting artillery fire even though he was mortally wounded. Only after the town had been taken and he could no longer speak did he leave the command he had inspired in victory and walk nearly 2 miles to an aid station where he died from his wound. By his intrepid leadership 1st Lt. Robinson was directly responsible for Company A's accomplishing its mission against tremendous odds.

== Legacy ==
The USNS Lt. James E. Robinson (T-AK-274) World War II Victory ship was renamed in his honor, as are Robinson Barracks in Germany.

== See also ==
- List of Medal of Honor recipients
- List of Medal of Honor recipients for World War II
