= Mike Colalillo =

US Army Medal of Honor recipient (1925–2011)

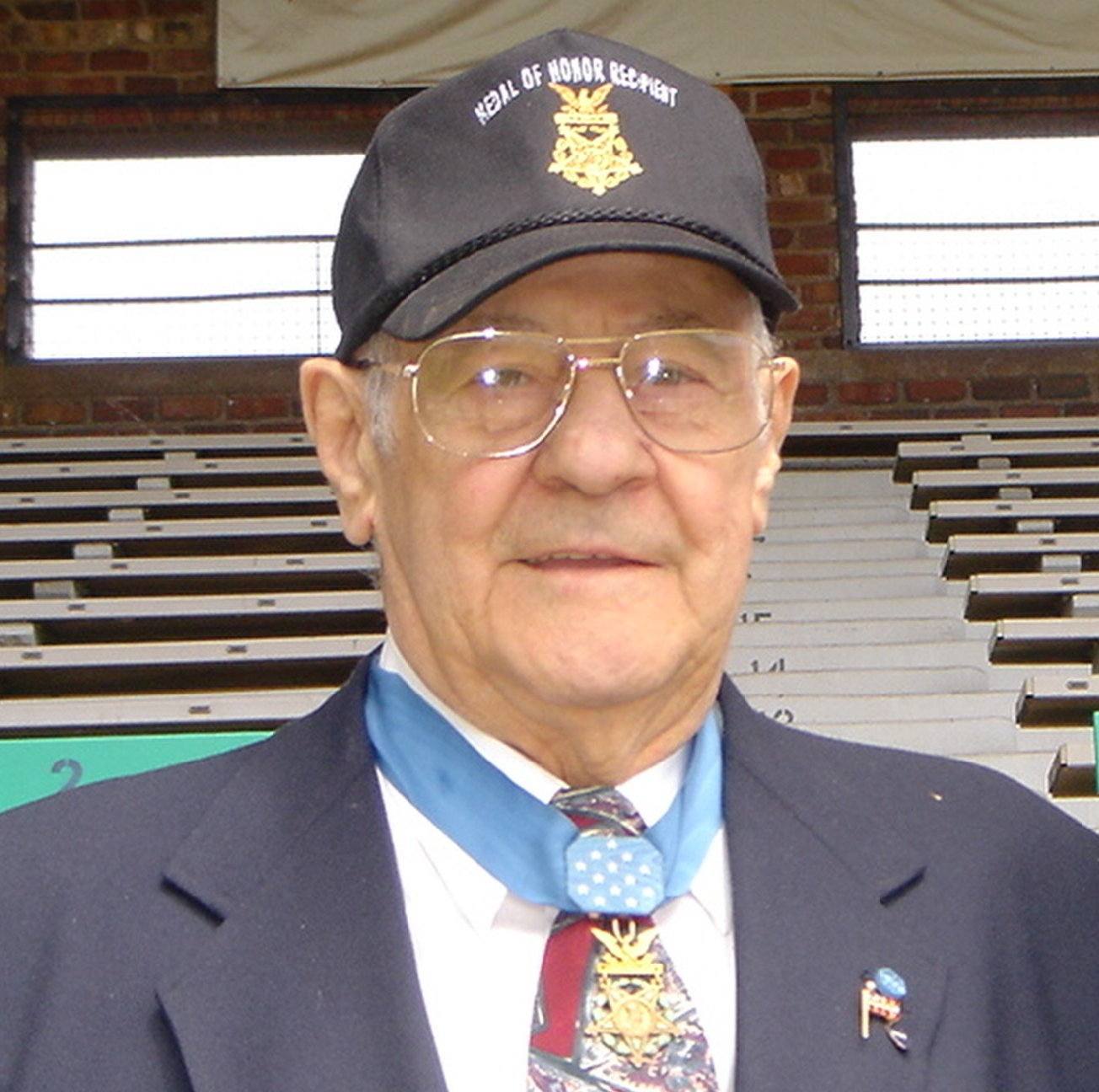
- Mike Colalillo, Medal of Honor recipient
- Born: December 2, 1925; Hibbing, Minnesota, US
- Died: December 30, 2011 (aged 86); Duluth, Minnesota, US
- Burial place: Forest Hill Cemetery, Duluth, Minnesota
- Military career
- Allegiance: United States
- Branch: United States Army
- Rank: Sergeant
- Units: 1st Battalion, 398th Infantry Regiment, 100th Infantry Division
- Conflicts: World War II: Battle of Buchhof and Stein am Kocher
- Awards: Medal of Honor; Silver Star; Bronze Star; Purple Heart

Michael Colalillo (December 2, 1925 – December 30, 2011) was a United States Army soldier and a recipient of the United States military's highest decoration – the Medal of Honor – for his actions during World War II.

== Early life ==
Colalillo was born on December 1, 1925, in Hibbing, Minnesota to Italian parents who had immigrated to the U.S. shortly before his birth. He was the eighth of nine children. His family struggled financially throughout the years, mainly due to the Great Depression. He grew up in a tough neighborhood in western Duluth, Minnesota.

Colalillo attended Denfeld High School but dropped out before graduating in order to help support his family by working at a local bakery after the death of his mother.

== Military service ==
Colalillo joined the Army from Duluth, Minnesota in February 1944, and was serving as a private first class in Company C, 398th Infantry Regiment, 100th Infantry Division, that was deployed in the Western Allied invasion of Germany.

On April 7, 1945, his unit fought Waffen-SS forces in the Battle of Buchhof and Stein am Kocher near Untergriesheim, Germany. Colalillo encouraged his comrades to follow him into enemy fire, manned an exposed machine gun, and helped a wounded soldier back to friendly lines. For his actions during the battle, he was awarded the Medal of Honor on January 9, 1946.

== Post-military service ==
After his discharge from the Army, Colalillo moved back to Duluth, Minnesota, where he married Lina Nissila on November 16, 1945. The couple had two daughters and a son.

In 1946, Colalillo was employed by the Interlake Iron Company as a coal dump laborer. In 1950, he suffered a serious injury when his hand was caught on a conveyor belt which caused permanent damage, making his hand nearly useless. After his injury, Colalillo worked as a longshoreman, and in 1987, he retired from the Duluth Port Authority.

== Death ==
Colalillo died on December 30, 2011, at the Ecumen Bayshore Care Center. He is buried at Forest Hill Cemetery in Duluth, Minnesota. He was Minnesota's last living Medal of Honor recipient.

== Medal of Honor ==
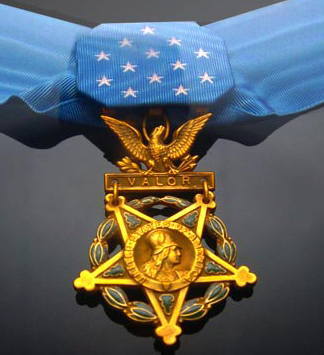

Michael "Mike" Colalillo
Rank and organization: Private First Class, U.S. Army, Company C, 1st Battalion, 398th Infantry Regiment, 100th Infantry Division
Place and date: Untergriesheim, Germany, 7 April 1945
Awarded for actions during: World War II
Born: December 2, 1925, Hibbing, Minnesota
General Orders: War Department, General Orders No. 4, January 9, 1945

Citation:

The President of the United States of America, in the name of Congress, takes pleasure in presenting the Medal of Honor to Private Michael "Mike" Colalillo, United States Army, for conspicuous gallantry and intrepidity in action above and beyond the call of duty on 7 April 1945, while serving with Company C, 1st Battalion, 398th Infantry, 100th Infantry Division. Private Colalillo was pinned down with other members of his company during an attack against strong enemy positions in the vicinity of Untergriesheim, Germany. Heavy artillery, mortar, and machine gun fire made any move hazardous when he stood up, shouted to the company to follow, and ran forward in the wake of a supporting tank, firing his machine pistol. Inspired by his example, his comrades advanced in the face of savage enemy fire. When his weapon was struck by shrapnel and rendered useless, he climbed to the deck of a friendly tank, manned an exposed machine gun on the turret of the vehicle, and, while bullets rattled about him, fired at an enemy emplacement with such devastating accuracy that he killed or wounded at least ten hostile soldiers and destroyed their machine gun. Maintaining his extremely dangerous post as the tank forged ahead, he blasted three more positions, destroyed another machine gun emplacement and silenced all resistance in his area, killing at least three and wounding an undetermined number of riflemen as they fled. His machine gun eventually jammed; so he secured a submachine gun from the tank crew to continue his attack on foot. When our armored forces exhausted their ammunition and the order to withdraw was given, he remained behind to help a seriously wounded comrade over several hundred yards of open terrain rocked by an intense enemy artillery and mortar barrage. By his intrepidity and inspiring courage Private First Class Colalillo gave tremendous impetus to his company's attack, killed or wounded 25 of the enemy in bitter fighting, and assisted a wounded soldier in reaching the American lines at great risk of his own life.

== Awards and decorations ==
SGT Colalillo was awarded throughout his military career the following:

Badge	Combat Infantryman Badge		
1st row	Medal of Honor		Silver Star
2nd row	Bronze Star with 1 Oak leaf cluster (2 awards)	Purple Heart	Army Good Conduct Medal
3rd row	American Campaign Medal	European–African–Middle Eastern Campaign Medal with 3 Campaign stars	World War II Victory Medal

== Gallery ==
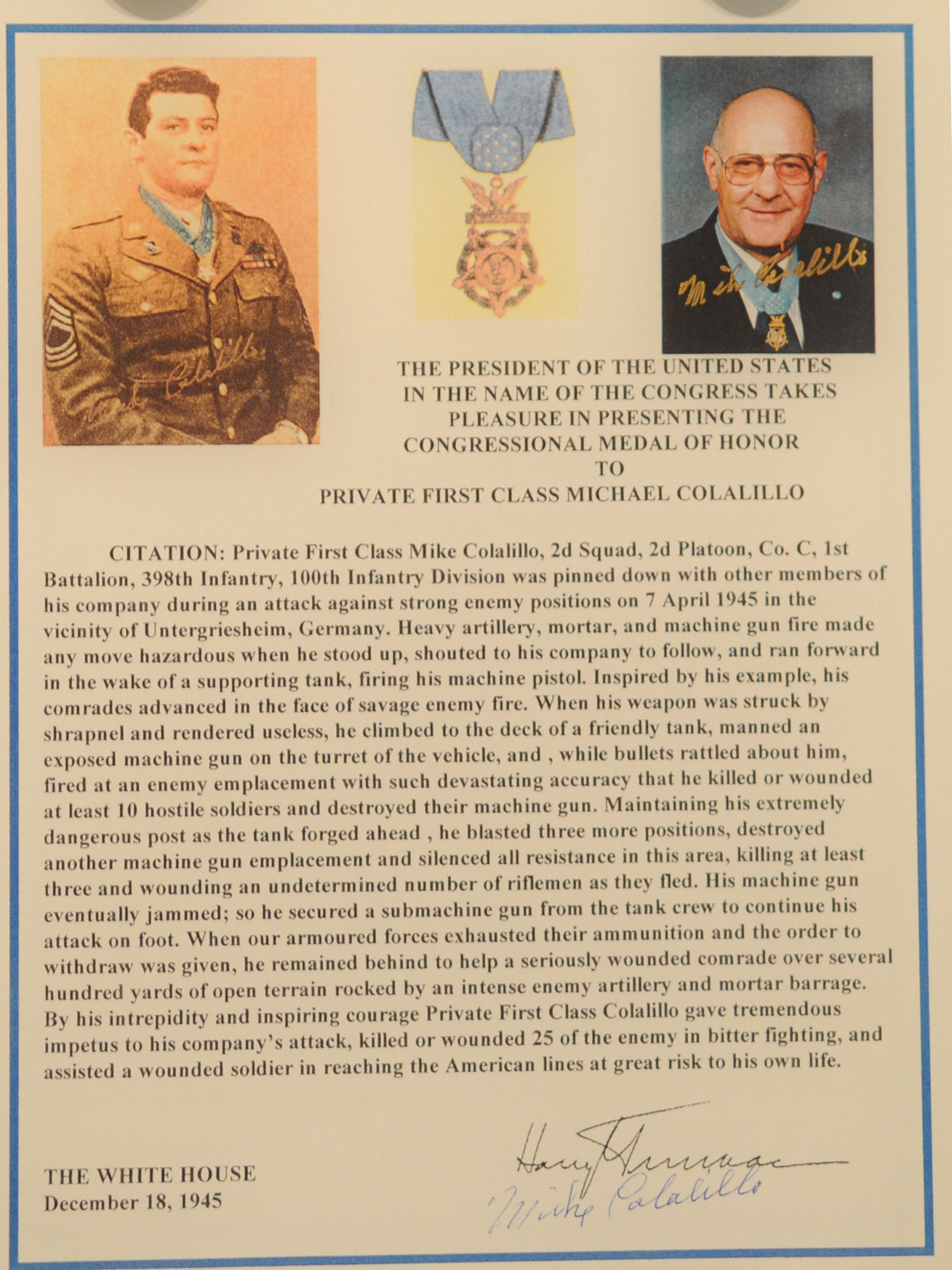
Citation

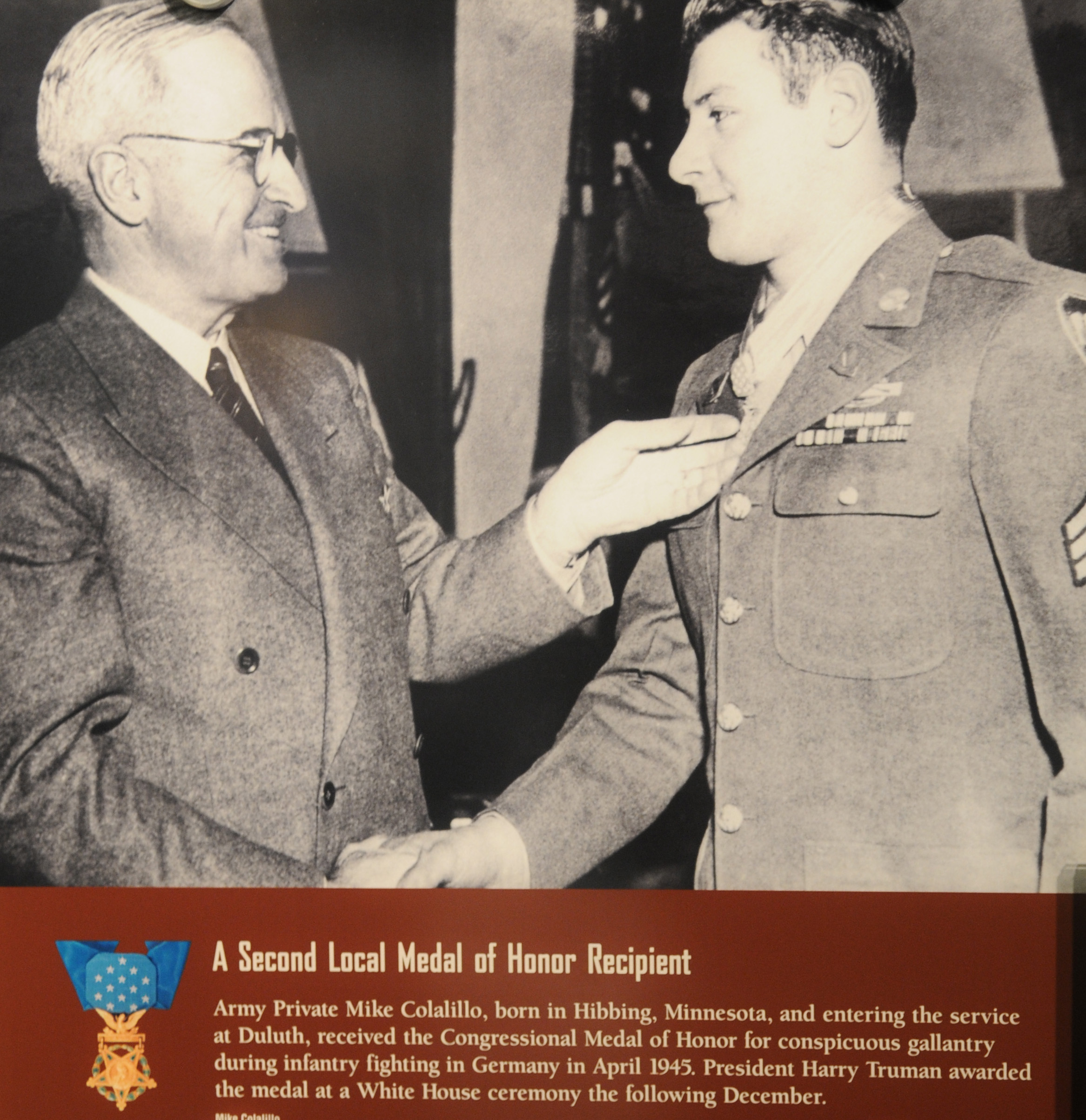
President Truman presenting award

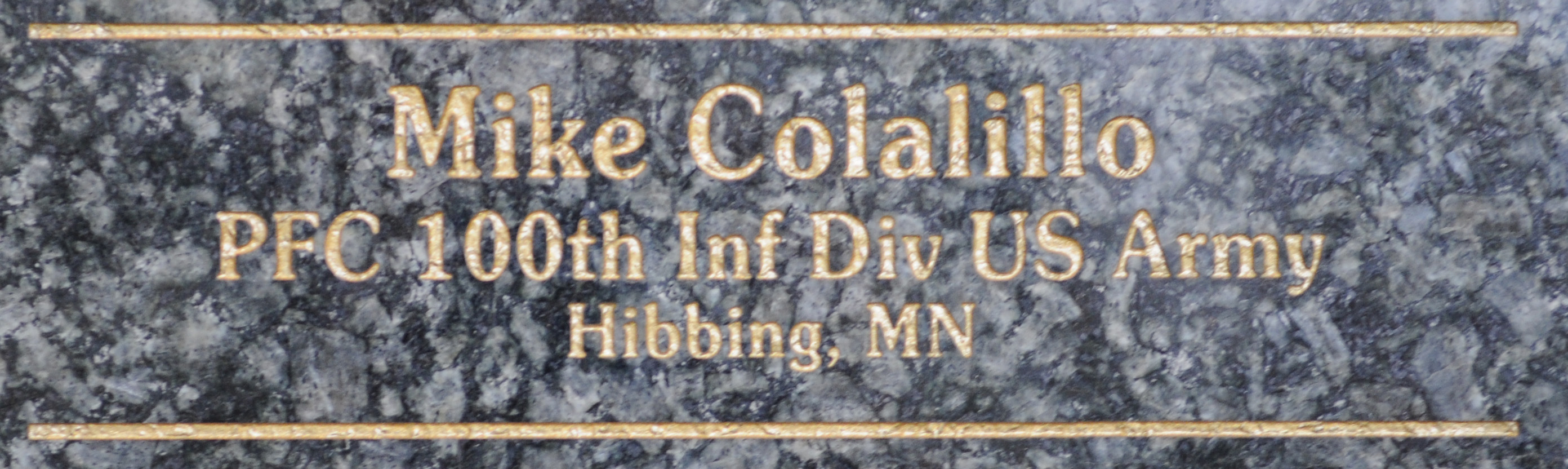
Mike Colalillo Brick

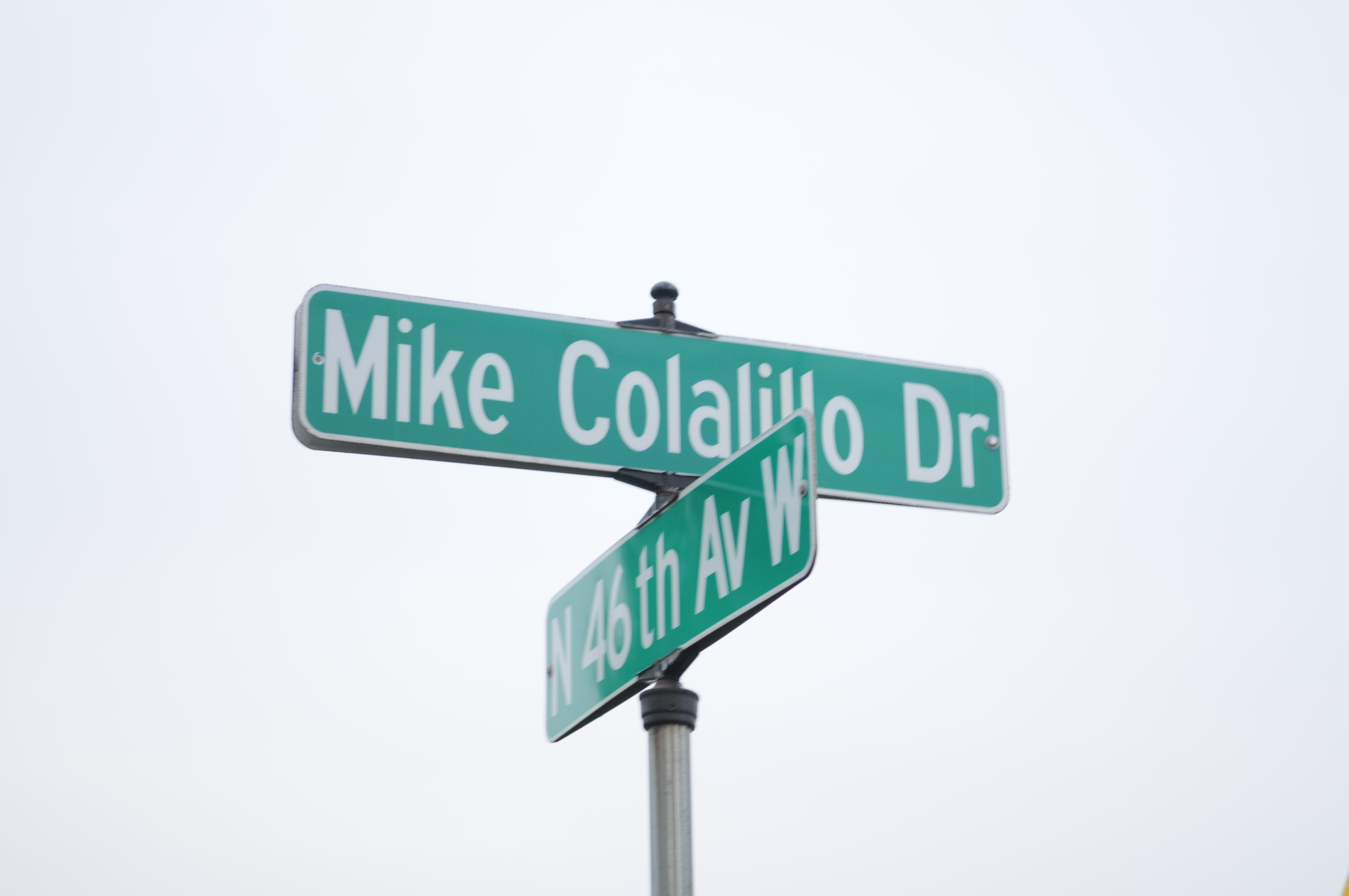
Mike Colalillo Drive, Duluth, MN

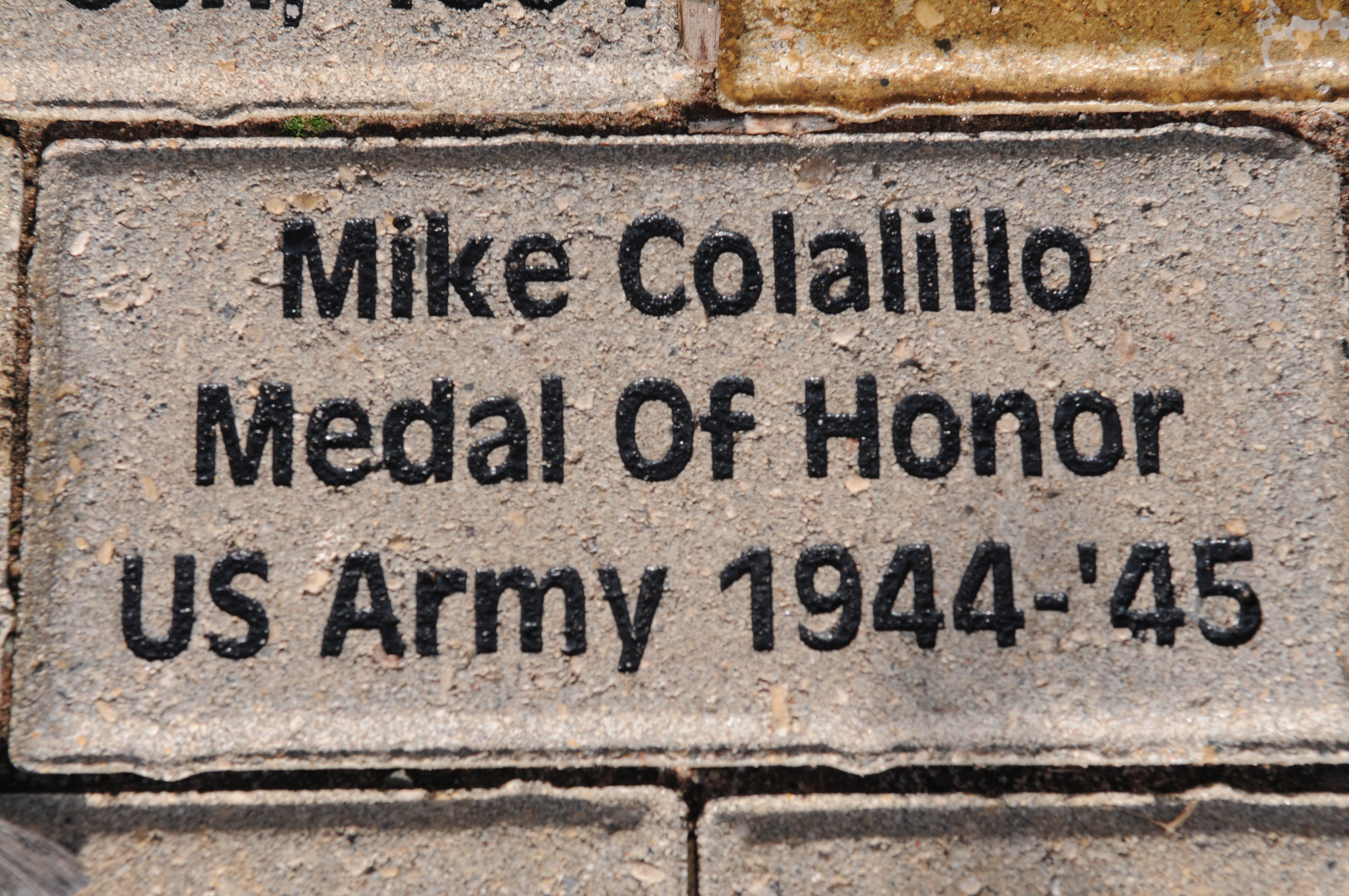
Duluth Memorial

== See also ==
- List of Medal of Honor recipients for World War II
