= 63rd Brigade Support Battalion =

- Coat of arms
- Active: 1 October 2012 – Present
- Country: United States of America
- Allegiance: United States Army
- Branch: United States Army Reserve
- Type: Battalion
- Role: Force sustainment
- Part of: Forces Command
- Motto: VEHICULUM VICTORIAE (Victory's Wagon)

The 63rd Brigade Support Battalion (63rd BSB) was a unit in the United States Army Reserve. The unit was activated on October 1, 2012, and the activation ceremony took place on October 21, 2012, at Nellis Air Force Base. The 63rd BSB was headquartered in Sloan, Nevada, southwest of Las Vegas, in the George W. Dunaway United States Army Reserve Center (named for George W. Dunaway, the 2nd Sergeant Major of the Army.)

The 63rd BSB planned, coordinated, synchronized, and executed replenishment operations in support of brigade operations. Some of the 63rd BSB's key supply operations included providing food service, basic levels of health care, and field maintenance.

An inactivation ceremony was held for the battalion on August 6, 2017, with an effective date of September 15, 2017.

== Heraldry ==
The unit's insignia was approved on 9 July 1964 during a previous period of service when the unit was designated as the 63rd Supply and Transport Battalion. The battalion carries the lineage of the 63d Quartermaster Company, 63d Infantry Division of the World War II era.
