= Christian Finnegan =

American actor

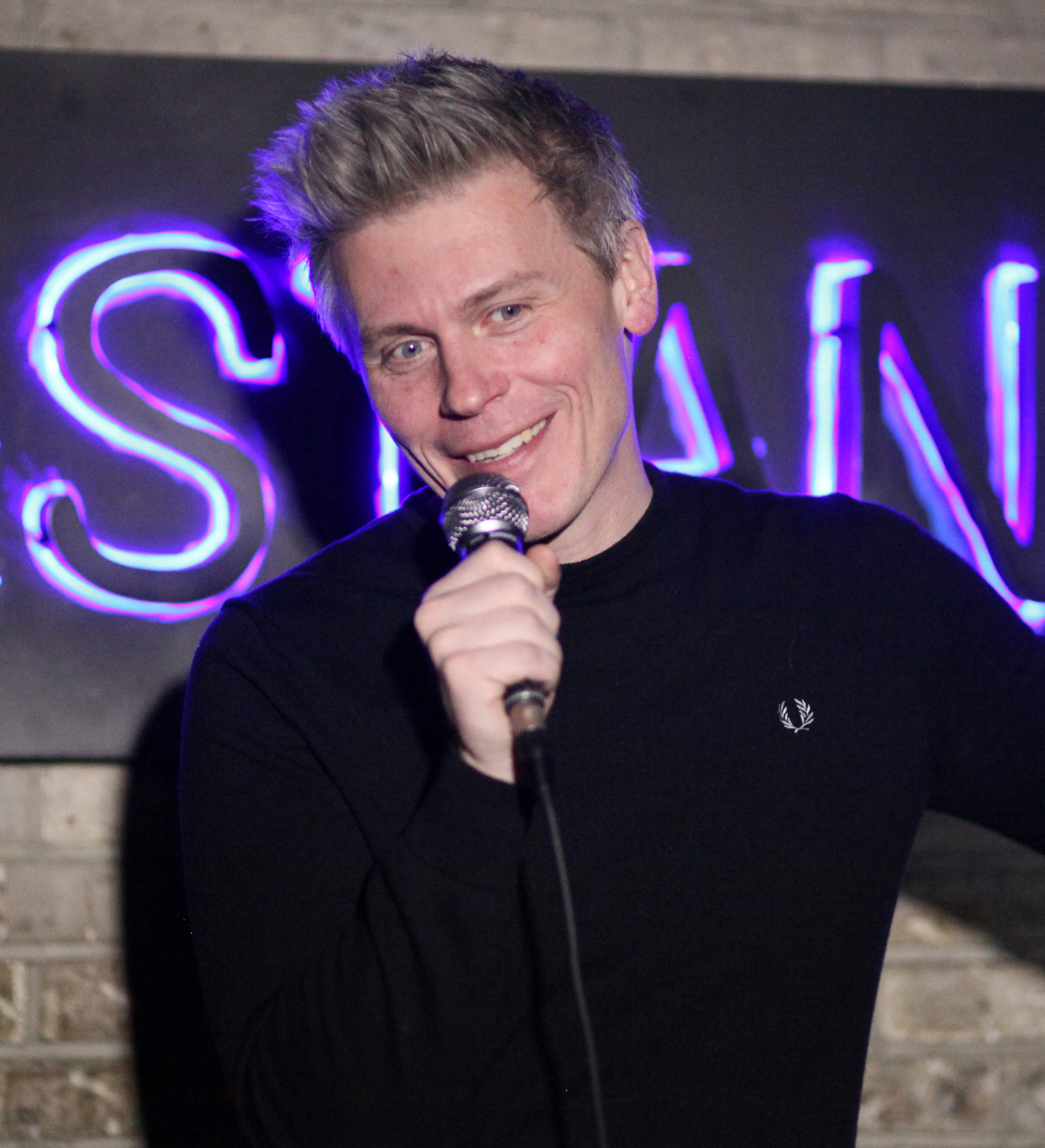
- Finnegan in 2017
- Born: Fletcher Christian Finnegan; April 1, 1973 (age 53); Albany, New York, U.S.
- Spouse: Kambri Crews (m. 2006)

Comedy career
- Medium: Stand-up, television
- Website: www.christianfinnegan.com

Fletcher Christian Finnegan (born April 1, 1973), better known as Christian Finnegan, is an American stand-up comedian, writer and actor based in New York City.

== Early life ==
Finnegan was born in Albany, New York. He grew up in Acton, Massachusetts, and attended The Walnut Hill School, a boarding/day high school focused on programs in the performing, visual, and creative arts and located in Natick, Massachusetts.

== Career ==
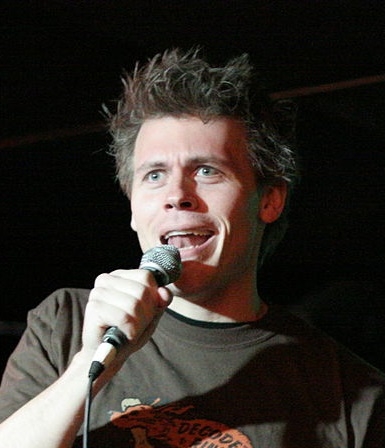
Finnegan in December 2006

Finnegan was a panelist on VH1's Best Week Ever and as Chad, the only white roommate in the “Mad Real World” sketch on Comedy Central's Chappelle's Show. Finnegan was a co-star in the TBS series Are We There Yet?.

Finnegan has appeared on Comedy Central, having starred in his own half-hour special Premium Blend, one hour stand up special “Au Contraire”, as well as Comedy Central Presents: Christian Finnegan and countless network interstitials. He served as a writer for Tough Crowd with Colin Quinn on which he also appeared as a guest. Finnegan's stand up was also featured in Comedy Central's animated series Shorties Watchin' Shorties.

Additional television appearances as himself or performing stand up have included “Conan”, “The Late Late Show with Craig Ferguson”, "Would You Rather...with Graham Norton", “Good Afternoon America” and multiple times on The Today Show and Countdown with Keith Olbermann, and on History's I Love the 1880s. He hosted TV Land's game show "Game Time". As an actor, Finnegan portrayed the supporting role of "Carl" in the film Eden Court, a ticket agent in Knight and Day and several guest roles including a talk show host on The Good Wife.

In October 2006, Finnegan's debut stand-up comedy CD titled Two For Flinching was released by Comedy Central Records, “Au Contraire!” was released by Warner Bros. Records in 2009. His third special "The Fun Part" was filmed at the Wilbur Theatre in Boston on April 4, 2013, and debuted on Netflix on April 15, 2014.

On December 31, 2014, Finnegan appeared on Ken Reid's TV Guidance Counselor Podcast. On July 27, 2016, he and comedian Sherrod Small began to co-host Black and White, a comedy/talk show on A&E that takes a humorous look at race relations in America.

== Personal life ==
On August 12, 2006, Finnegan married author and producer Kambri Crews.

In 2006, he lost 88 pounds, as he discussed on his blog, Tower of Hubris.
