= Barbara Rotvig =

Barbara Joan Rotvig
- Pitcher
- Born: July 2, 1928; Duluth, Minnesota, U.S.
- Died: December 27, 1963 (aged 35); Ann Arbor, Michigan, U.S.
- Batted: Right Threw: Right

Teams
- Kenosha Comets (1948–1949, 1951)

Career highlights and awards
- Threw a no-hitter (1948)

Barbara Joan "Big Swede" Rotvig (July 2, 1928 – December 27, 1963) was a pitcher in the All-American Girls Professional Baseball League who played with the Kenosha Comets for parts of three seasons spanning 1948–1951. Rotvig batted and threw right-handed. She was born in Duluth, Minnesota to Arnold B. and Bertha (Ekman) Rotvig.

A hard throwing pitcher, Barbara Rotvig never had a winning season, mainly because of poor run support. Still, she neither posted an earned run average above 2.84 in her three-year career.

Rotvig hurled a no-hitter in her rookie season. She finished with an 11–16 record and a 2.52 ERA in 30 games, allowing 99 runs (66 earned) on 159 hits and 96 walks, while striking out 99 batters in 107 innings of work. Nevertheless, she suffered terrible control issues that led her to lead the league for the most hit-by-pitch batters (19) and more wild pitches (16).

Her most productive season came in 1949, when she slightly improved to an 11–15 mark with a 2.33 ERA and a seventh-best 97 strikeouts. She did not play in 1950, but returned the next year and went 6–10 with a 2.57 ERA, while ending sixth with 93 strikeouts.

Barbara Rotvig was one of Duluth's Denfeld High School most successful female athletes before girls' sports were officially sanctioned. She played semi-pro softball, participated in the All-American golf league and joined the Women's Professional Golf Tour.

Rotvig was involved in intramural volleyball, track, basketball, softball and golf while at Denfeld. She also participated in Speech, Pyramid, Criterion, choir and band.

In 1960, the first LPGA National Golf School staff was established under the guidance of Shirley Spork and Barbara Rotvig.

She died December 27, 1963, of cancer in the University of Michigan Hospital in Ann Arbor, Michigan, at the age of 36.

An award in her name is given each year to the outstanding female athlete of the year at Denfeld.

Rotvig is part of Women in Baseball, a permanent display based at the Baseball Hall of Fame and Museum in Cooperstown, New York, which was unveiled in 1988 to honor the entire All-American Girls Professional Baseball League.

== Career statistics ==
Pitching

GP	W	L	W-L%	ERA	IP	H	RA	ER	BB	SO	WP	HBP	WHIP	SO/BB
82	28	41	.406	2.58	551	375	242	158	206	289	28	43	1.05	0.988

Batting

GP	AB	R	H	2B	3B	HR	RBI	SB	TB	BB	SO	BA	OBP	SLG
91	194	15	28	2	0	0	10	2	30	27	38	.144	.249	.195

Fielding

GP	PO	A	E	TC	DP	FA
82	11	133	17	161	1	.895
