= 63rd Readiness Division =

- 63rd Infantry Division shoulder sleeve insignia
- Active: 18 January 1943–27 September 1945 (Army of the U.S.); 22 February 1952–31 December 1965 (Organized Reserves); 1 January 1968–April 1995 (63rd ARCOM); April 1995–16 July 2003 (63rd Regional Support Command); 16 July 2003-10 August 2018 (63rd Regional Readiness Command); 10 August 2018–present (63rd Readiness Division)
- Country: United States
- Branch: United States Army Reserve
- Type: Army Reserve area administration
- Part of: United States Army Reserve Command
- Garrison/HQ: Moffett Federal Airfield, California
- Nicknames: "Blood and Fire" (special designation)
- Motto: Pride – Honor – Service
- Engagements: World War II; Rhineland; Central Europe

Commanders
- Current commander: Maj. Gen. Windsor S. Buzza
- Command Sergeant Major: CSM Eric Bethurem

Insignia
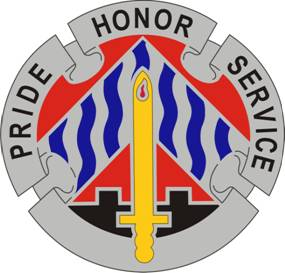
- Distinctive unit insignia

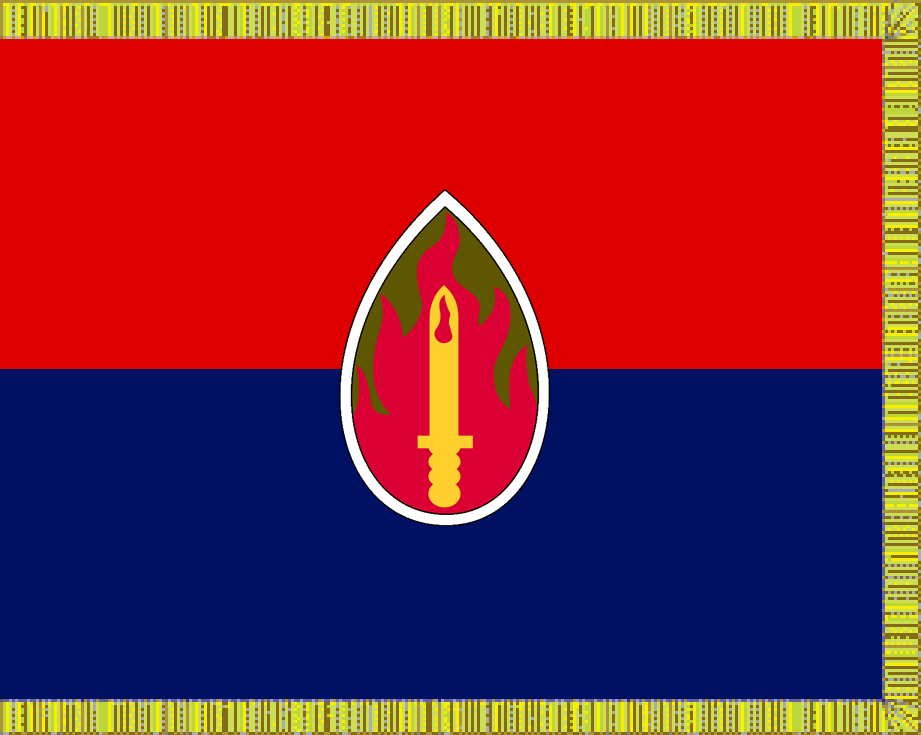
- Flag of 63rd Infantry Division 1943–68, 63rd Readiness Division 2009- present

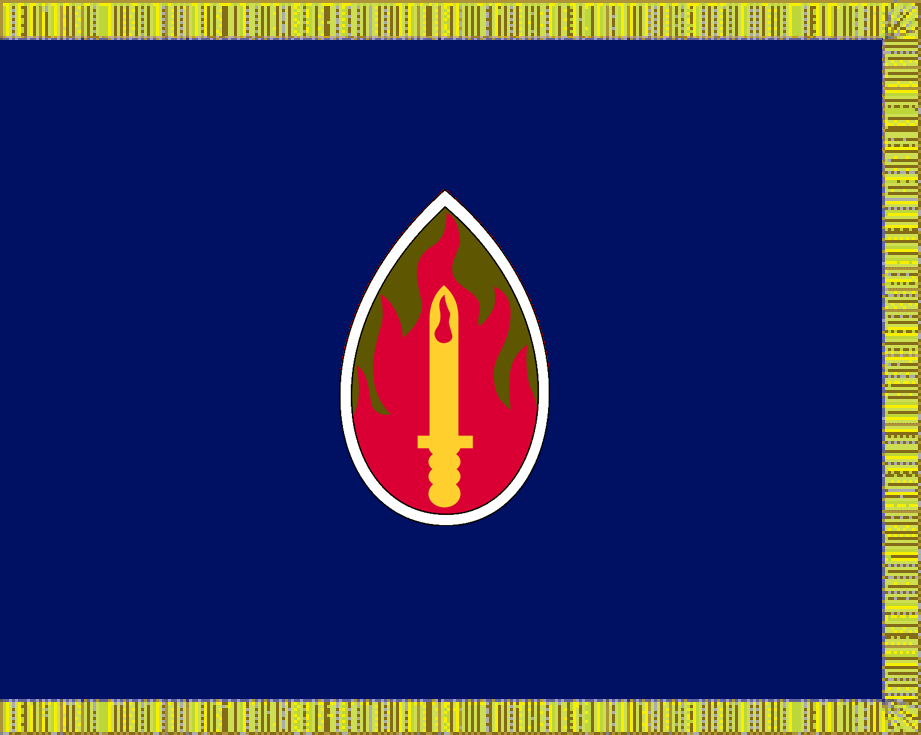
- Flag of 63rd Regional Support Command 1968–2009

The 63rd Readiness Division is a base and administrative support formation of the United States Army Reserve (USAR). It is responsible for USAR units throughout the seven-state region of southwestern United States including California, Nevada, Arizona, New Mexico, Oklahoma, Texas and Arkansas.

The 63rd RSC traces its history to the 63rd Infantry Division ("Blood and Fire"), an infantry division of the Seventh Army of the Sixth United States Army Group of the Army of the United States that fought in Europe during World War II. After the war it was inactivated, but later the division number and shoulder sleeve insignia were authorized for use by the 63rd Army Reserve Command (ARCOM) of the United States Army Reserve.

Although the 63rd Regional Readiness Command located in Los Alamitos, CA, was not authorized to carry the lineage of the 63rd Infantry Division, the creation of the new 63rd Readiness Division in Moffett Field, CA, authorizes it to inherit the lineage and the bi-color red and blue background 63rd Infantry Division flag as an exception to policy. The unit was inactivated on 6 December 2009 and replaced by the 79th Sustainment Support Command, and was reactivated as a regional support command.

== Organization 2025 ==
The 63rd Readiness Division is a subordinate geographic command of the United States Army Reserve Command. The division provides programs and services that enhance individual and unit readiness for mobilization and deployment of Army Reserve forces in the states of Arizona, Arkansas, California, Nevada, New Mexico, Oklahoma, and Texas. As of December 2025 the division consists of the following units:

- 63rd Readiness Division, in Mountain View (CA)
  - III Armored Corps Main Command Post — Operational Detachment (MCP-OD), at Fort Hood (TX)

Public Affairs units:
- 201st Theater Public Affairs Support Element, in Bell (CA)
  - 222nd Broadcast Operations Detachment, in Bell (CA)
  - 301st Mobile Public Affairs Detachment, in Mesa (AZ)
  - 302nd Mobile Public Affairs Detachment, in Vallejo (CA)
- 205th Theater Public Affairs Support Element, at Joint Base San Antonio (TX)
  - 206th Broadcast Operations Detachment, in Grand Prairie (TX)
  - 211th Mobile Public Affairs Detachment, in Bryan (TX)
  - 343rd Mobile Public Affairs Detachment, at Camp Robinson (AR)
  - 345th Mobile Public Affairs Detachment, at Joint Base San Antonio (TX)

Military History Detachments:
- 22nd Military History Detachment, in Bell (CA)
- 35th Military History Detachment, in Bell (CA)
- 47th Military History Detachment, in Bell (CA)
- 51st Military History Detachment, in Bell (CA)

Chaplain Detachments
- 105th Chaplain Detachment, at March Air Reserve Base (CA)
- 107th Chaplain Detachment, in Grand Prairie (TX)
- 112th Chaplain Detachment, at Camp Robinson (AR)
- 114th Chaplain Detachment, at Camp Parks (CA)
- 121st Chaplain Detachment, in San Marcos (TX)
- 122nd Chaplain Detachment, in Seagoville (TX)

Army Bands:
- 191st Army Band, at Camp Parks (CA)
- 300th Army Band, in Bell (CA)
- 395th Army Band, in Mustang (OK)

== History ==
=== World War II ===
- Activated: 15 June 1943
- Overseas: 25 November 1944
- Campaigns: Ardennes-Alsace (Operation Northwind), Rhineland campaign (253rd, 254th, and 255th Infantry Regiments only), Central Europe
- Days of combat: 119
- Prisoners taken: 21,542

==== Formation ====
The 63rd Infantry Division was activated in the Army of the United States on 15 May 1943 at Camp Blanding, Florida, using a cadre from the 98th Infantry Division. Shortly thereafter, the division removed to Camp Van Dorn, Mississippi to train for action in Europe. On three occasions during the next seventeen months the division turned recruits into combat teams that were sent overseas as replacement troops. The first elements of the division arrived in Europe in December 1944, were assigned to the Seventh Army of the U.S. Sixth Army Group of the United States Army and deployed in support of the Battle of the Bulge; the balance joined them in France in January 1945.

==== Division organization ====
The 63rd Infantry Division consisted of the following units.

63rd Infantry Division organization (click to enlarge)

- 63rd Infantry Division
  - 63rd Infantry Division Headquarters
  - 63rd Cavalry Reconnaissance Troop (Mechanized) (M3 scout cars and then M8 Greyhound armored cars)
  - 253rd Infantry Regiment
    - Headquarters and Headquarters Company
    - 3× Infantry battalions
      - each battalion consists of: 1× Headquarters and Headquarters Company, 3× Rifle companies, 1× Heavy Weapons Company
    - Cannon Company (T12 Gun Motor Carriages and T19 Howitzer Motor Carriages, later replaced by either M3 105mm towed howitzers or M7 Priest self propelled howitzers)
    - Anti-Tank Company (M3 37mm anti-tank guns, which were replaced by 1944 with M1 57mm anti-tank guns)
    - Service Company
  - 254th Infantry Regiment
    - same organization as 253rd Infantry Regiment
  - 255th Infantry Regiment
    - same organization as 253rd Infantry Regiment
  - 63rd Infantry Division Artillery
    - Headquarters and Headquarters Battery
    - 718th Field Artillery Battalion
      - Headquarters and Headquarters Battery
      - 3× Batteries (M1 155mm towed howitzers)
      - Service Battery
    - 861st Field Artillery Battalion
      - Headquarters and Headquarters Battery
      - 3× Batteries (M2 105mm towed howitzers)
      - Service Battery
    - 862nd Field Artillery Battalion
      - same organization as 861st Field Artillery Battalion
    - 863rd Field Artillery Battalion
      - same organization as 861st Field Artillery Battalion
  - Headquarters Special Troops
    - Headquarters Company, 63rd Infantry Division
    - 563rd Signal Company
    - 63rd Quartermaster Company
    - 763rd Ordnance Light Maintenance Company
    - Military Police Platoon
    - 63rd Infantry Division Band (attached)
  - 263rd Engineer Combat Battalion
    - Headquarters and Headquarters and Service Company
    - 3× Engineer combat companies
  - 363rd Medical Battalion
    - Headquarters and Headquarters Detachment
    - 3× Collecting companies
    - Clearing Company

Attached units:

- 70th Tank Battalion (attached 12–18 March 1945)
- 740th Tank Battalion (attached 17–28 March 1945)
- 753rd Tank Battalion (attached 31 March-28 May 1945)
- 692nd Tank Destroyer Battalion (attached 30–31 May 1945)
- 776th Tank Destroyer Battalion (attached 16–21 March 1945)
- 822nd Tank Destroyer Battalion (attached 21 March-28 May 1945)
- 436th AAA Automatic Weapons Battalion (attached 11 February-1 May 1945)

More attached and detached units are listed here:

==== Combat chronicle ====
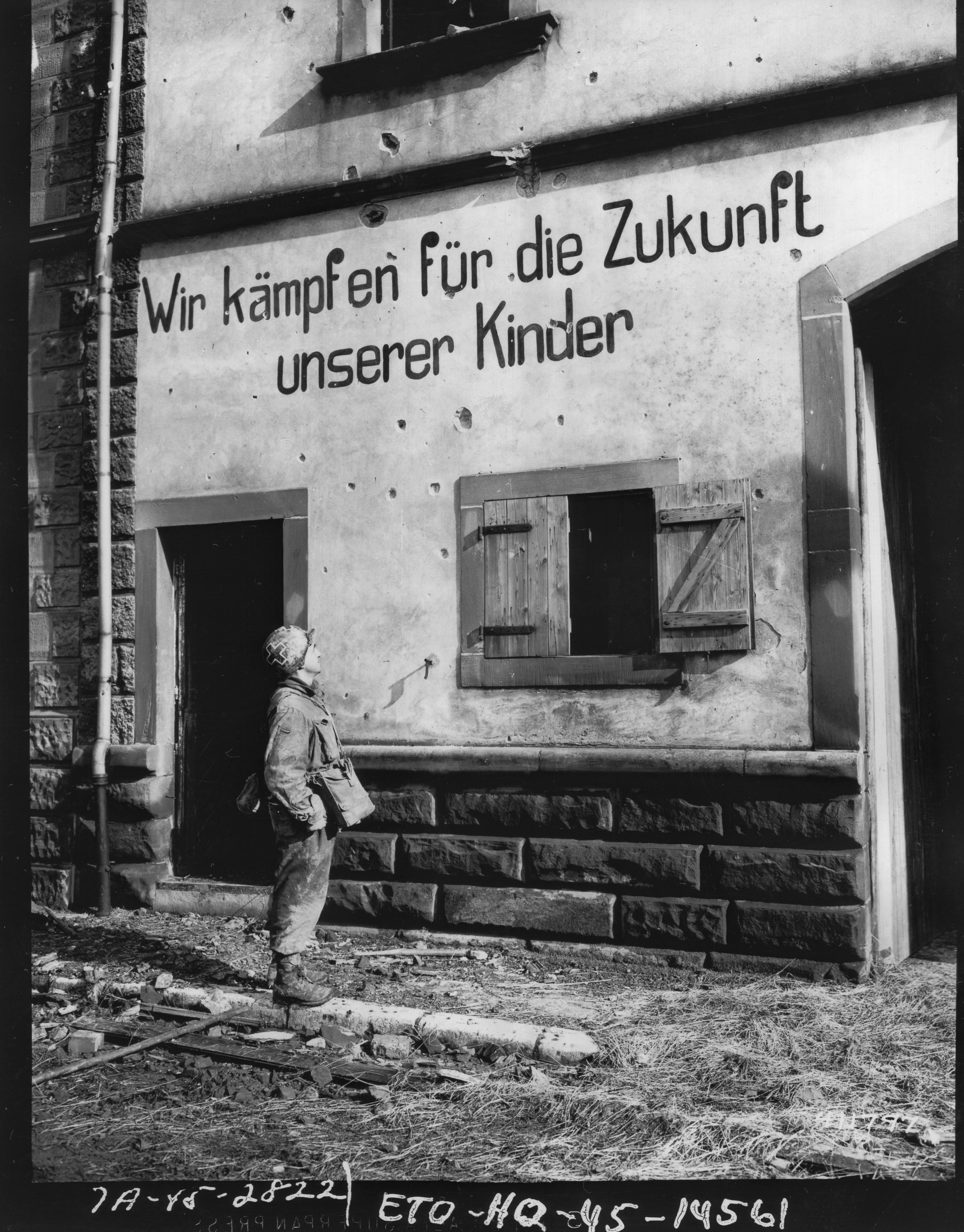
PFC Abraham Green, a medic from New Haven, Connecticut, 253rd Regiment, 63rd Division, reads a German morale booster, "We fight for the future of our children". Kleinblittersdorf, Germany, 21 February 1945

Three regiments of the 63rd Division arrived in Marseille, France, 8 December 1944, trained at Haguenau and, under the designation Task Force Harris, protected the east flank of the Seventh Army along the Rhine River. The task force fought defensively from 22 to 30 December 1944. On 30 December 44, while the 253d Inf Regt was attached to the 44th Inf Division and the 255th Inf Regt was attached to the 100th Inf Division, the 254th Inf Regt was moved to the Colmar area of France where it was attached to the 3d Inf Division which was at the time a part of the First French Army. The infantry regiments remained with their attachments until early February 1945. The rest of the division arrived at Marseille, 14 January 1945, and moved to Willerwald on 2 February, where it was joined by the advance elements on 6 February. On 7 February, the 63rd conducted local raids and patrols, then pushed forward, crossing the Saar River on 17 February, and mopping up the enemy in the Mühlenwald (Mühlen Woods). After bitter fighting at Güdingen early in March, the division smashed at the Siegfried Line on 15th at Saarbrücken, Germany, taking Ormesheim and finally breaching the line at Sankt Ingbert and Hassel on 20 March. Hard fighting still lay ahead, but the Siegfried Line was Germany's last attempt to defend its prewar boundaries along the western front. Before resting on 23 March, the 63d took Spiesen-Elversberg, Neunkirchen and Erbach. On 28 March, the division crossed the Rhine at Worms, moved to Viernheim and occupied Heidelberg on 30 March, establishing its command post there on 1 April. Continuing the advance, the 63rd crossed the Neckar River near Mosbach and the Jagst River on 3 April. The 253rd Infantry Regiment, received the majority of the German resistance during this time at the Battle of Buchhof and Stein am Kocher. Heavy resistance slowed the attack on Bad Wimpfen, Möckmühl, and Adelsheim.

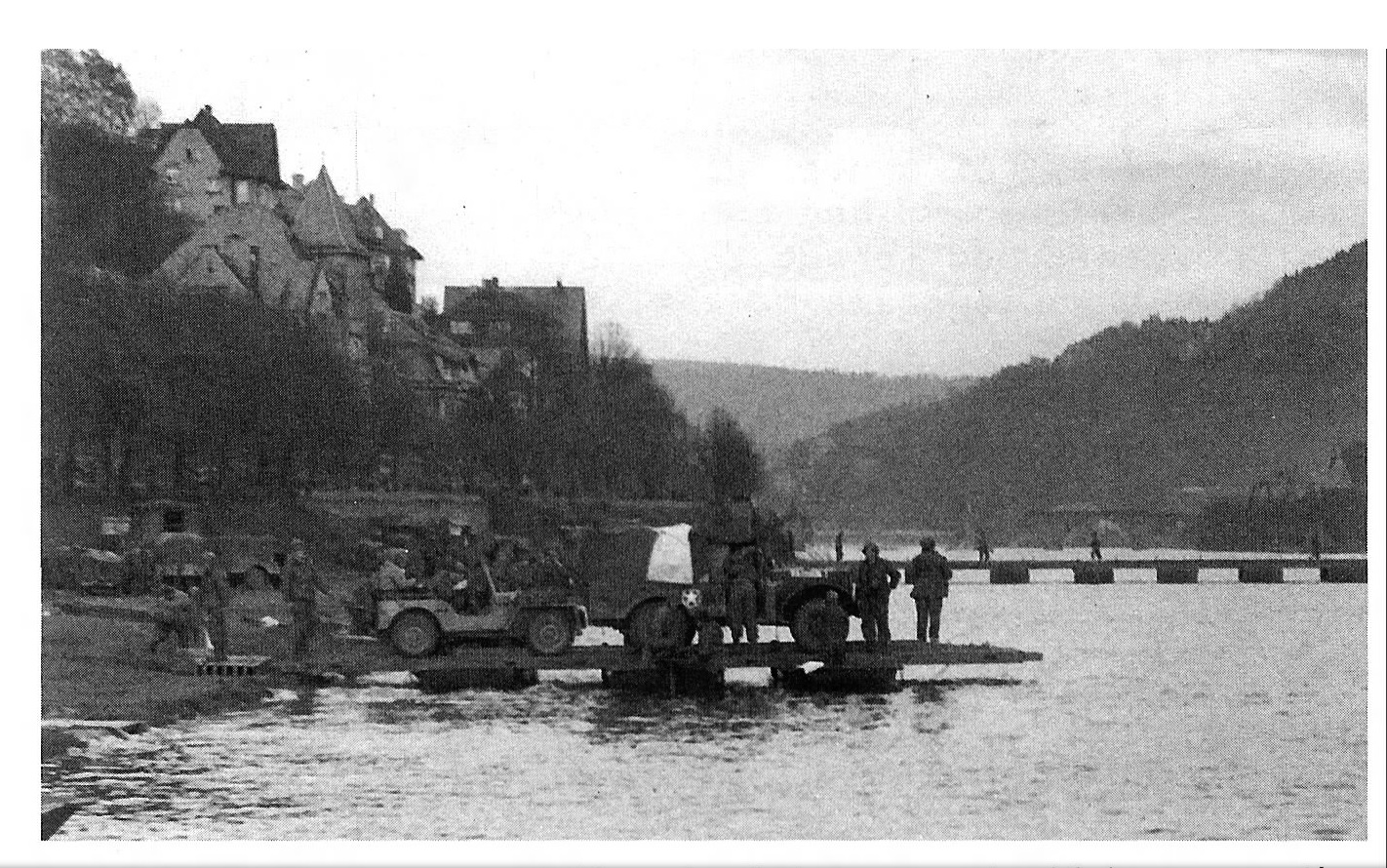
The 289th Engineer Combat Battalion ferrying troops and vehicles of the 63rd Division over the Neckar River at Heidelberg 31 March, 1945

The division switched to the southeast, capturing Lampoldshausen and clearing the Harthäuser Woods on 7 April. A bridgehead was secured over the Kocher River near Weißbach on 8 April, and Schwäbisch Hall fell on 17 April. Advance elements crossed the Rems River and rushed to the Danube. The Danube was crossed on 25 April, and Leipheim fell before the division was withdrawn from the line on 28 April. A final command post was established at Bad Mergentheim on 30 April, 1945, after which the division was assigned security duty from the Rhine to Darmstadt and Würzburg on a line to Stuttgart and Speyer. The 63d began leaving for home on 21 August 1945, and was inactivated on 27 September 1945.

From mid-February 1945 until the end of the war, the 63d Division saw constant combat from Sarreguemines through the Siegfried Line to Worms, Mannheim, Heidelberg, and Gunzburg, with elements ending in Landsberg at the end of April 1945, pulled from the line for a much needed rest.

==== Controversy ====
On 15 April 1945, American soldiers from the 63rd Infantry Division perpetrated the Jungholzhausen massacre, when they killed between 13 and 30 Waffen-SS prisoners of war in Braunsbach.

==== Commanders ====
- Brigadier General/Major General Louis E. Hibbs (June 1943 – July 1945)
- Brigadier General Frederick M. Harris (August 1945 – 27 September 1945)

==== Casualties ====
- Total battle casualties: 4,502
- Killed in action: 861
- Wounded in action: 3,326
- Missing in action: 98
- Prisoner of war: 219

==== Awards ====
- 7 Presidential Unit Citations
  - 254th Infantry Regiment for Colmar, France (Colmar Pocket, 22 January-6 February 1945 (WD GO Number 44, 1945))
  - 2nd Battalion, 254th Infantry Regiment for Jebsheim, France, 25–29 January 1945 (WD GO Number 42, 1946)
  - Companies A and B and 3rd Battalion, 253rd Infantry Regiment for Kleinblittersdorf. Germany, 17–24 February 1945 (WD GO Number 45, 1946)
  - Company C, 253rd Infantry Regiment for Bübingen, Germany, 3–5 March 1945 (WD GO Number 44, 1945)
  - 1st Battalion, 254th Infantry Regiment for Ensheim/Siegfried Line, Germany, 16–20 March 1945 (DA GO Number 14, 1997)
  - 3rd Battalion, 254th Infantry Regiment for Siegfried Line, Germany, 16–20 March 1945 (DA GO Number 14, 1997)
  - 2nd Battalion, 253rd Infantry Regiment for Buchhof and Stein, Germany, 4–12 April 1945 (DA letter, 22 March 2000, Awards Branch, DA)
- 1 French Croix de Guerre with Palm – 254th Infantry Regiment
- 16 Meritorious Unit Commendations
- 2 Medals of Honor
  - Staff sergeant John R. Crews
  - First Lieutenant James E. Robinson Jr. (Posthumously)
- 14 Distinguished Service Crosses
  - S/Sgt Jack M. Collette (Posth.)
  - Pfc Daniel F. Cronin
  - Pfc Walter J. Dilbeck, Jr.
  - Pfc John A. Dyer
  - Capt Robert H. Meade
  - S/Sgt Clifford B. Myrice
  - S/Sgt Edward H. Patterson
  - Capt Angelo E. Pilla
  - Pfc Eugene B. Reich
  - Sgt Carroll H. Ryerson (Posth.)
  - 1st Lt Nathan S(c)hankman (Posth.)
  - Pfc Gerald B. Stegemeyer
  - Lt Col Robert E. Tucker
  - Capt Robert S. Young (Posth.)
- 1 Distinguished Service Medal
- 455 Silver Stars
- 3 Legions of Merit
- 29 Soldier's Medals
- 5,313 Bronze Stars
- 68 Air Medals
- 4,999 Purple Heart Medals
- 1 British Military Cross
- 2 British Military Medals
- 2 French Legions of Honor
- 15 French Croix de Guerre individual awards

=== Post-war History (1945–1962) ===
- Headquarters, 63rd Infantry Division
  - Inactivated 27 September 1945 at Camp Myles Standish, Massachusetts.
  - Assigned 1 March 1952 to the Sixth Army.
  - Activated 1 March 1952 at Los Angeles, California (reflagged from 13th Armored Division.
  - Reorganized and redesignated 31 March 1959 as Headquarters and Headquarters Company, 63rd Infantry Division.
  - Location changed 27 March 1960 to Bell, California.
  - Inactivated 31 December 1965 at Bell, California.

On 1 May 1959, the division was reorganized as a Pentomic Division. The division's three infantry regiments were inactivated and their elements reorganized into five infantry battle groups:

- 253rd Infantry Regiment
  - Inactivated 27–29 September 1945 at Camp Patrick Henry, Virginia, and Camp Myles Standish, Massachusetts.
  - Activated 1 March 1952 with headquarters at Los Angeles, California.
  - Inactivated 1 May 1959 at Los Angeles, concurrently, Headquarters and Headquarters Company consolidated with Headquarters and Headquarters Company Headquarters, 3rd Battle Group, 31st Infantry.
  - The Battle Group was activated 1 May 1959 with headquarters at Los Angeles, California. Reorganized and reflagged as the 3rd Battalion, 31st Infantry on 1 October 1963. Location of headquarters changed 16 March 1964 to Playa del Rey, California, and inactivated at Playa del Rey on 31 December 1965.
- 254th Infantry Regiment
  - Inactivated 29 September 1946 at Camp Kilmer, New Jersey.
  - Activated 1 March 1952 with headquarters at Pasadena, California.
  - Inactivated 15 May 1959 at Kansas City, concurrently, Headquarters and Headquarters Company consolidated with Headquarters and Headquarters Company Headquarters, 3rd Battle Group, 30th Infantry.
  - The Battle Group was activated 1 May 1959 with headquarters at Pasadena, California. Reorganized and reflagged as the 3rd Battalion, 30th Infantry on 1 April 1963, and inactivated at Pasadena on 31 December 1965.
- 255th Infantry Regiment
  - Inactivated 29 September 1945 at Camp Kilmer, New Jersey.
  - Activated 1 March 1952 with headquarters at Los Angeles, California.
  - Inactivated 1 May 1959 at Los Angeles, concurrently, Headquarters and Headquarters Company consolidated with Headquarters and Headquarters Company Headquarters, 3rd Battle Group, 27th Infantry.
  - The Battle Group was activated 1 May 1959 with headquarters at Los Angeles, California. Reorganized and redesignated as the 3rd Battalion, 27th Infantry on 1 April 1963, and inactivated at Los Angeles on 31 December 1965.
- Two additional Battle Groups were also formed:
  - The 3rd Battle Group, 15th Infantry was activated 1 May 1959 with headquarters in Santa Ana, California. Reorganized and reflagged as the 3rd Battalion, 15th Infantry on 1 April 1963, and inactivated at Santa Ana 31 December 1965.
  - The 3rd Battle Group, 21st Infantry was activated 1 May 1959 with headquarters at Santa Barbara, California, and inactivated there on 1 April 1963.

=== Army Reserve ===
The 63rd Infantry Division was reactivated in February 1952 as a unit reflagged from the 13th Armored Division, and assigned to the Army Reserve, with headquarters in Los Angeles, California.

==== ROAD Division Organization ====
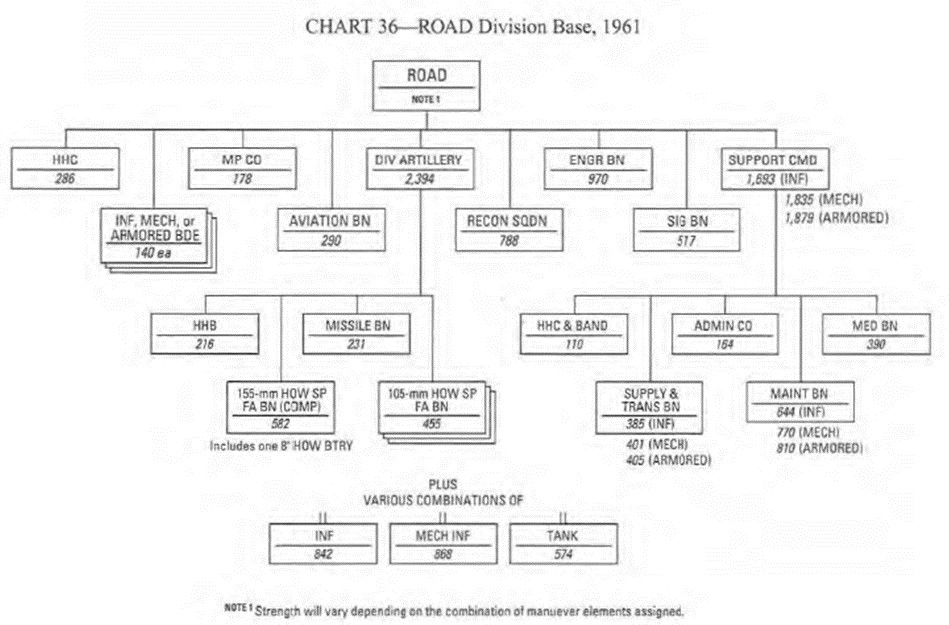
Standard organization chart for a ROAD division

On 1 April 1963, the division was reorganized as a Reorganization Objective Army Division (ROAD) unit. Three brigade headquarters were activated and the Infantry battle groups were reorganized into six battalions. Two Armor battalions and five Field Artillery battalions were assigned to the Division.

- Headquarters, 1st Brigade was activated at Bell, California and inactivated there on 31 December 1965.
- Headquarters, 2nd Brigade was activated at Pasadena, California, and inactivated there on 31 December 1965
  - The 3rd Battalion, 15th Infantry was activated on 1 April 1963 with headquarters in Santa Barbara, California, and inactivated there 31 December 1965.
  - The 4th Battalion, 27th Infantry was activated 1 April 1963 with headquarters in Long Beach, California, and inactivated there 31 December 1965.
- Headquarters, 3rd Brigade was activated at Los Angeles, California, and inactivated there on 31 December 1965.
  - The 3rd Battalion, 21st Infantry was activated 1 May 1959 with headquarters at Santa Barbara, California, and inactivated there on 1 April 1963.
  - The 3rd Battalion, 27th Infantry was activated on 1 April 1963 in Los Angeles, and inactivated there on 31 December 1965.
  - The 3rd Battalion, 30th Infantry was activated on 1 April 1963 in Pasadena, and inactivated there on 31 December 1965.
  - The 3rd Battalion, 31st Infantry was activated on 1 May 1959 in Los Angeles, moved to Playa del Rey and inactivated there on 31 December 1965.
  - The 5th Battalion, 40th Armor was assigned to the Division on 27 March 1963 and inactivated on 31 December 1965.
  - The 7th Battalion, 40th Armor was assigned to the Division on 1 April 1963 and inactivated on 31 December 1965.
- Headquarters, 63rd Infantry Division Artillery was activated 1 May 1959 at Bell, California and inactivated 31 December 1965.
  - The 5th Battalion, 11th Field Artillery was activated on 31 March 1959 at Fresno, California and inactivated 31 December 1965.
  - The 5th Battalion, 19th Field Artillery was activated on 31 March 1959 at San Bernardino, California and inactivated 31 December 1965.
  - The 4th Battalion, 21st Field Artillery was activated on 31 March 1959 at Bell, California and inactivated 31 December 1965.
  - The 5th Battalion, 35th Field Artillery was activated on 1 May 1959 at Pasadena and inactivated 1 April 1963.
  - The 3d Battalion, 77th Field Artillery was activated on 1 May 1959 at Van Nuys and inactivated 31 December 1965.
- Division Support Command
  - 63d Supply and Transport Battalion

The division and subordinate elements were again inactivated on 31 December 1965, and the colors were transferred to the 63rd Reinforcement Training Unit.

==== Army Reserve Command ====
On 1 January 1968, the 63rd Army Reserve Command (ARCOM) was activated and, as an exception to policy, allowed to wear the shoulder sleeve insignia and distinctive unit insignia of the 63rd Infantry Division. The 63rd ARCOM did not, however, perpetuate the lineage and honors of the 63rd Infantry Division, as Department of the Army policy does not authorize TDA units, such as ARCOMs, to inherit the lineage and honors of TO&E units, such as divisions.

Based at Los Alamitos Armed Forces Reserve Center, the command encompassed Army Reserve units in Southern California, Arizona, and Nevada. From 1990 through 1991, over 2,500 Army Reserve soldiers from the 63rd ARCOM served on active duty in support of Operation Desert Shield and Operation Desert Storm. Twenty-two of the command's units were mobilized, with fourteen of them deploying to the Persian Gulf.

In April 1995, the 63rd ARCOM was redesignated as the 63rd Readiness Division (RSC) (later revised to Regional Readiness Command (RRC)), and its geographic boundaries were realigned to coincide with those of Federal Emergency Management Agency Region IX. The 63rd commanded and controlled 14,000 soldiers and 140 units in the states of California, Arizona and Nevada, and supported the major functional reserve commands within its area. It supported both foreign and domestic active Army missions, including participation in NATO operations in Bosnia and Kosovo.

On 12 January 1994, the Tucson Citizen reported that functions of the 8th Battalion, 40th Armor, part of the 63rd ARCOM, would be transferred to the Nevada Army National Guard. The unit had been headquartered in at the Tucson Reserve Center. The 8th Battalion's "mission will be transferred to Nevada. The battalion, with headquarters in Tucson, is slated to be shut down and its mission transferred to Nevada, according to congressional sources. Congressman Jon Kyl, R-Phoenix, said yesterday that officials associated with the 63d U.S. Army Reserve Command briefed members of the 8/40 over the weekend and, for the first time, informed members of the unit that it will be deactivated. Kyl said mission functions, but not personnel, from the armored unit are set to be transferred to the Nevada National Guard. Kyl said Pentagon officials indicated the deactivation will take effect in 1997. Closure of the 8/40 could result in the loss of 642 Army Reserve positions in Arizona. The unit has companies in Phoenix and Fort Huachuca that also would be closed under the plan. The unit inactivated in September 1996.

Thousands of soldiers from the 63rd RRC served in the War in Afghanistan (2001-2021); and the Iraq War (U.S. phase, 2003-2010). In September 2008, the 63rd and 90th RRCs combined into the 63rd which was redesignated the 63rd RSC again, with its new headquarters at Moffett Field, California. As a key component of the Army Reserve's transition to an operational force, the newly formed 63rd RSC has foregone command and control of units in favor of a greatly expanded area of responsibility. The 63rd RSC provides base support and administrative support to over 40,000 Army Reserve soldiers in the southwest United States.

== Insignia ==
- Shoulder sleeve insignia:
  - Description: On a tear-drop-shaped olive drab background 5.72 cm (2¼ in.) wide and 8.89 cm (3½ in.) long, a scarlet flame of five rays superimposed by an upright gold sword in pale, charged with a scarlet drop of blood.
  - Symbolism: The design alludes to the unit's motto, "Blood and Fire" (see below).
    - Background: The shoulder sleeve insignia was designed by the division's first commander, Brigadier General Louis E. Hibbs. It was originally approved for the 63d Infantry Division on 27 March 1943. It was authorized for the 63d Army Reserve Command on 22 April 1968. It was reassigned and authorized effective 16 April 1996, for the 63d Regional Support Command. The insignia was redesignated effective 16 July 2003, for the 63d Regional Readiness Command. It was redesignated effective 17 September 2008, for the 63d Regional Support Command and amended to add a symbolism.
- Distinctive unit insignia:
  - Description: A silver color metal and enamel device, 3.02 cm (1 3/16 in.) in diameter, consisting of a silver chevron on a red background, bearing seven blue wavy vertical bands; in base, a black embattled area with two merlons; encircling all, a continuous silver scroll of four folds inscribed on the upper three folds, "PRIDE" "HONOR" "SERVICE" in black letters. Overall, a yellow vertical sword, the tip charged with a scarlet drop.
  - Symbolism: The elements of the design reflect the history of the 63d Infantry Division. The silver chevron simulates a spearhead and is indicative of the aggressiveness displayed by the 63rd Infantry Division during the crossing of seven European rivers—the Saar, Rhine, Neckar, Jagst, Kocker, Rems, and Danube—during World War II. The rivers are represented by the seven blue wavy bands. The breaching of the Siegfried Line at Sankt Ingbert and Hassell is symbolized by the two black merlons of the embattled area, surmounted by the yellow sword with the scarlet drop taken from the shoulder sleeve insignia of the organization.
  - Background: The distinctive unit insignia was originally approved for the 63d Army Reserve Command on 8 May 1970. It was reassigned and authorized effective 16 April 1996, for the 63d Regional Support Command. The insignia was redesignated for the 63d Regional Readiness Command effective 16 July 2003. It was redesignated effective 17 September 2008, for the 63d Regional Support Command.
- Motto: "Blood and Fire," inspired by a quote of British Prime Minister Winston Churchill. At the Casablanca Conference in 1943, shortly before the activation of the 63d Infantry Division, Churchill promised to make the enemy "bleed and burn in expiation of their crimes." The slogan was adopted by Brigadier General Louis E. Hibbs, the division's first commander, who designed the shoulder sleeve insignia.

== See also ==
- 289th Engineer Combat Battalion (United States)
- SS Sea Owl – 661st Tank Destroyer Battalion
- 549th Engineer Light Pontoon Company
- Wesley Addy, who was an officer in the 63rd Infantry Division during World War II
- Tony Bennett, who served in the 63rd Infantry Division during World War II
- Allen M. Burdett Jr., served in the division's 255th Infantry Regiment during World War II. He would later go on to become a Lieutenant General in the army.
- Frederick Kroesen. 254th Regiment. Later United States Army Europe(USAREUR) Commander
