= Battle of Buchhof and Stein am Kocher =

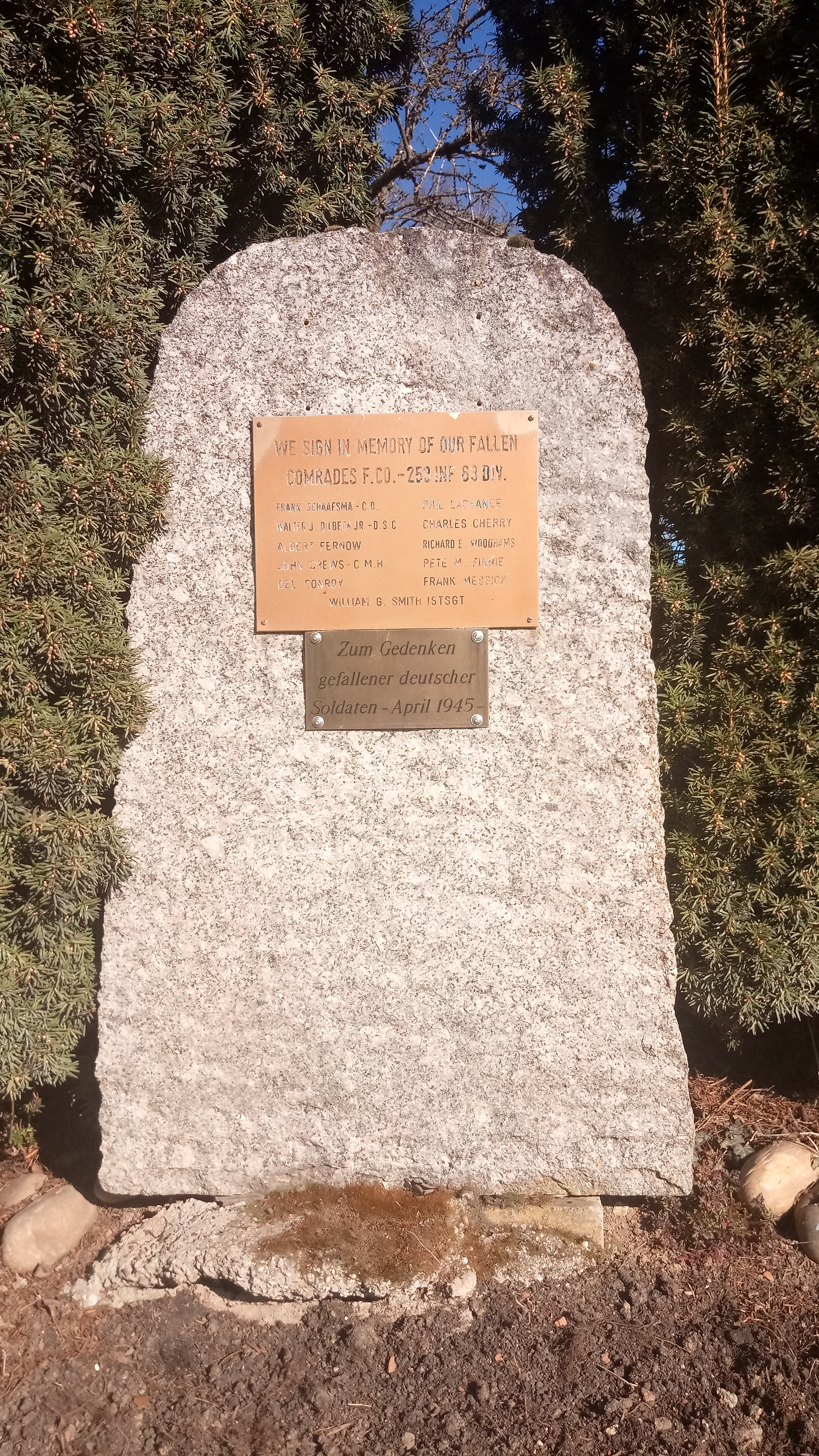
Battle of Buchhof and Stein am Kocher

The Battle of Buchhof and Stein am Kocher was a seven-day battle fought between the 17th SS Panzergrenadier Division Götz von Berlichingen and 253rd Infantry Regiment, 63rd Infantry Division, First Battalion, 398th Infantry Regiment, 100th Infantry Division (United States) and the 753rd Tank Battalion. It was fought between the Neckar River and the Kocher River, and the three major points that had fighting in them were the areas around and the towns of Untergriesheim (Bad Friedrichshall), Buchhof, and Stein am Kocher (Neuenstadt am Kocher). These three towns were major battles between the Jagst and Kocher Rivers over the period of 4–12 April 1945. The Battle between the Jagst and Kocher Rivers was the northern section of the Battle of Heilbronn.

"On April 9th ... Company F, Company E, and Company G was down to 63, 50, and 83 men, respectively. Of the approximately 500 infantry men who were in the Battalion 7 days prior, only 196 did not sustain any physical injuries from this battle." 2nd Battalion of the 253rd Infantry Regiment sustain 66 killed in action and 238 wounded in action. The unit did not receive their Presidential Unit Citations until 2000. Also according to Malone's 2014 book on the battle 9 men of F Company 253rd Infantry Regiment have the wrong date of death.

== Awards ==
- 2nd Battalion of the 253rd Infantry Regiment 63rd Infantry Division medals for April 2–12:
  - one Medal of Honor Staff Sergeant John R. Crews of the 2 the division earned during the war.
  - three Distinguished Service Cross (United States) of the 9 that the division earned during the war.
  - Silver Stars
  - Bronze Stars
  - one Presidential Unit Citation
- First Lieutenant James E. Robinson Jr.., of Battery A, 861st Field Artillery Battalion, 63d Infantry Division, was posthumously awarded the Medal of Honor for his actions near Untergriesheim and Kressbach, in which he suffered mortal wounds, on April 6, 1945.
- Private First Class Mike Colalillo, of Company C, 398th Infantry, 100th Infantry Division, received the Medal of Honor for leading an attack against strong German positions near Untergriesheim, on April 7, 1945.
