= Denfeld High School =

Coordinates: 46.7485520°N 92.1585243°W

Duluth Denfeld High School
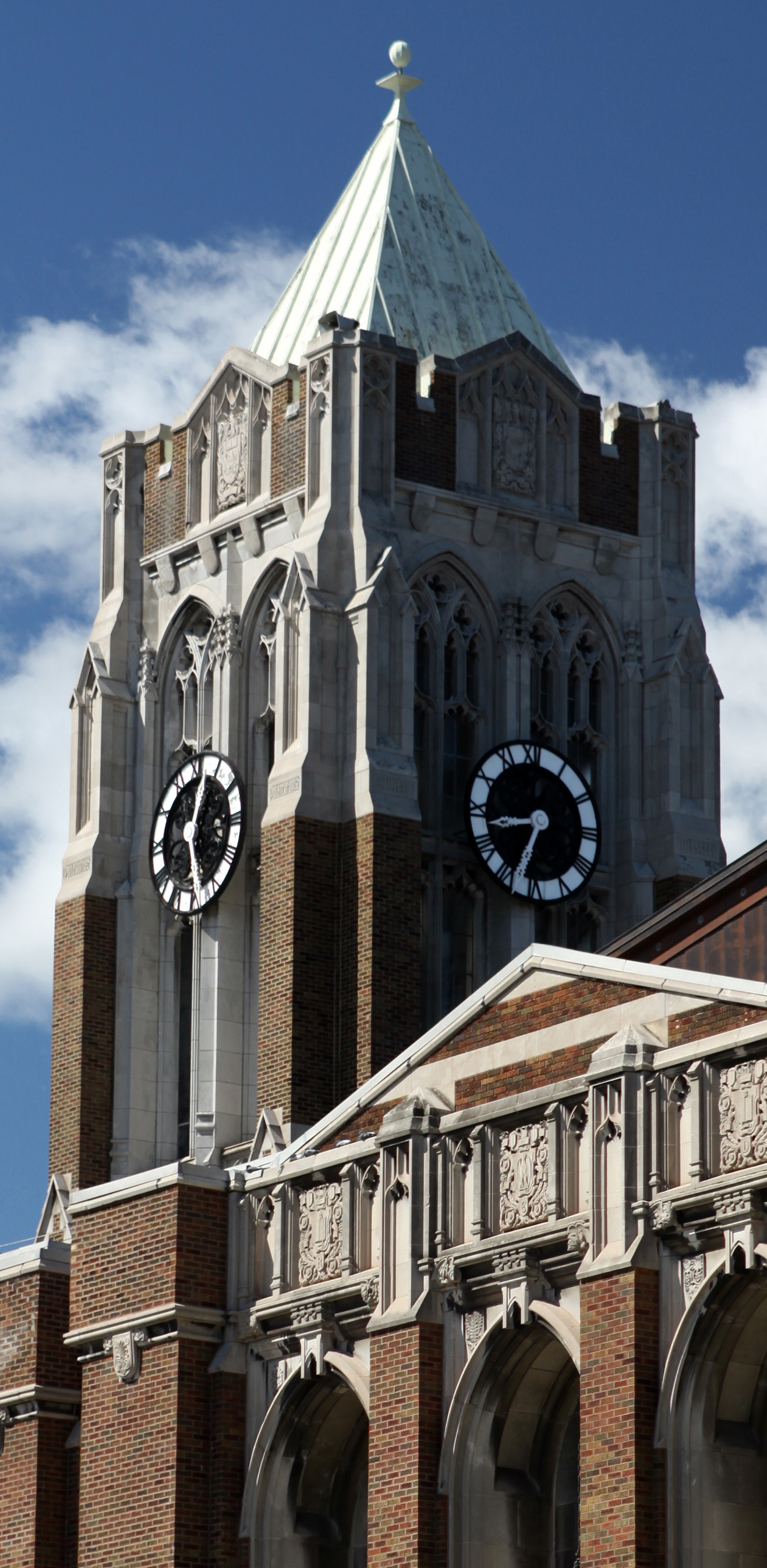

Location
- 401 N 44th Ave W Duluth, Minnesota 55807; United States

Information
- Type: Public
- Motto: HOME OF THE HUNTERS
- Established: 1905
- Teaching staff: 59.52 (FTE)
- Student to teacher ratio: 15.41
- Colors: Maroon and gold
- Mascot: Hunters
- Website: https://www.isd709.org/denfeld

Duluth Denfeld High School, also known as Denfeld High School, is one of two high schools in Duluth, Minnesota, along with Duluth East. Serving over 1,000 students in grades 9 to 12, Denfeld High School has become a West Duluth landmark. It is known for its architecture, including a historic auditorium and a 120-foot clock tower visible from Grand Avenue.

== History ==
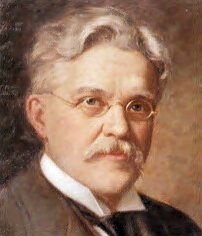
Robert E. Denfeld

The home of the Hunters, Denfeld High School was known as Irving High School when it opened for classes on 11 September 1905. It was later called Duluth Industrial High School. When the school moved into today's MacArthur West school building at 725 North Central Avenue in 1915, its name was changed to honor Robert E. Denfeld, superintendent of Duluth schools from 1885 to 1916. During his tenure, the number of schools in Duluth increased from seven to 34. Denfeld was instrumental in the creation of a two-year program to train teachers that eventually grew to become the University of Minnesota Duluth.

The current building was constructed in red brick and limestone for $1,250,000 and opened in September 1926. Duluth architects Abraham Holstead and W. J. Sullivan designed the H-shaped English Gothic style building, which features medieval carvings by Duluth master stone carver George Thrana. Thrana came to Duluth in 1889 from Norway, where he was trained as a stone sculptor. He carved for 40 years in sandstone, granite, marble and limestone, and his work is featured on many Duluth buildings, including the Lyceum Theater, Old Central High School, Glensheen, the Board of Trade Building, St. Louis County Courthouse, and the St. Louis County Jail.

The school has a 120-foot clock tower with eight buttresses. Its face was designed by Carl Shroer, a teacher at Central High School, and was completed by Denfeld students who welded together four sections cast in aluminum by the Duluth Brassworks Company. The numbers on the face were painted silver and the clock hands were gold painted wood. The face was later painted black to make it more visible from Grand Avenue.

Denfeld High School's auditorium was built for $25,000 and is another of its most prominent features. It can accommodate nearly 2,000 audience members and 200 people on stage, and includes an orchestra pit. Public figures who have visited the auditorium include Richard Nixon and Johnny Cash. The auditorium was renovated for $1,200,000 and reopened in 2006 after being closed for nearly a year. It is the annual venue for Denfeld's traditional Maroon and Gold Day assembly during homecoming week, when the auditorium is adorned with maroon and gold decorations.

== Future of the school ==
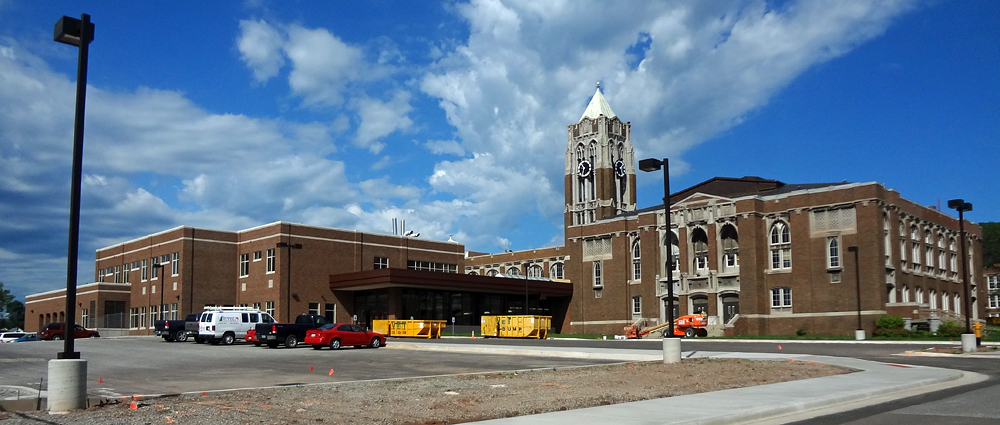
Additions under construction in July 2011

In the spring of 2007, restructuring of Duluth's elementary, middle and high schools was discussed. Three options were proposed:

- The Red Plan: Central and East would no longer function as high schools, leaving Denfeld as the only original high school in Duluth. Ordean Middle School would be turned into a high school with both buildings being remodeled and expanded to accommodate 1500 students.
- The White Plan: Denfeld and East would become middle schools capable of holding 1100 students. Central would not be used, as Ordean and a new western high school would be created to accommodate 3000 total students.
- The Blue Plan: East and Denfeld would be transformed into middle schools. Central would be used as the lone high school after being expanded to accommodate 3000 students.

The Duluth School District ultimately chose a modified version of the Red Plan, leaving Denfeld open and adding approximately half of the Central population. To accommodate the increased student population, two new additions to the school were built. Additionally, the school underwent major reconstruction in order to conform to state standards. Construction began in 2009 and continued until 2011. To accommodate the new addition, Denfeld's signature brick chimney had to be removed. The chimney was an original feature of the building, but had not been used in many years. Construction crews carefully removed the bricks, and the school planned to preserve some bricks for historical purposes. As a result of the construction, Denfeld and Central students both attended Central during the 2010–11 school year. In 2011, Central closed, leaving Denfeld and East as the only public high schools in Duluth.

== Principals ==
- Tom Tusken (2020 to present)
- Tonya M. Sconiers (2012 to 2019)
- Ed Crawford (2005 to 2012)
- William Westholm (1995 to 2005)
- George F. Holliday, Jr. (1991 to 1995)
- Dr. Stephen Seyfer (1984 to 1991)
- Dr. Wayne Samskar (1970 to 1984)
- Robert Van Kleek (1963 to 1970)
- G. Dell Daedo (1948 to 1963)
- Dr. Chester Wood (1945 to 1948)
- James Taylor (1918 to 1945)
- T. H. Shutte (1916 to 1918)
- Scott Foster (1905 to 1916)

== Athletic/Activities Achievements ==

- 1917 Football unofficial state champions
- 1922 Football state runner-up
- 1924 Football district champions
- 1926 Football Head of the Lakes champions
- 1927 Football unofficial state champions
- 1933 Football city champions
- 1935 Football unofficial state champions
- 1941 Football city champions
- 1942 Football unofficial state champions
- 1945 Football city champions
- 1946 Football city champions
- 1947 Basketball state champions
- 1947 Ski jumping state champions
- 1948 Football state champions
- 1950 Baseball state champions
- 1951 Ski jumping state champions
- 1953 Ski jumping state champions
- 1954 Baseball goes to State
- 1964 Football city champions
- 1974 Football "Super Bowl" champions
- 1986 Hockey state 3rd place
- 1988 Hockey state 4th place
- 1989 Hockey state 3rd place
- 1990 Girls Softball state 4th place
- 1990 Soccer's inaugural season, unofficial "Area" Champs as local teams were only HS Club level until '91
- 1992 Girls Basketball state 4th place
- 1994 Boys Soccer Lake Superior Conference Champions, North Sub-Section 4 champions, Section 4 runners-up
- 1996 Football Sea Range Conference champions
- 2000 Girls Soccer Section 7A champions
- 2002 Boys Soccer Lake Superior Conference champions
- 2003 Boys Soccer Lake Superior Conference champions
- 2004 Boys Soccer Section 7A champions, State participants.
- 2004 Football North Country Conference co-champions
- 2005 Football North Country Conference runners-up
- 2006 Two-time state third-place finisher in swimming (50 free and 100 butterfly)
- 2007 Football North Country Conference runners-up
- 2010 Football North Country Conference champions
- 2012 One Act Play Sections runners-up
- 2012 Boys Soccer Section 7A second place
- 2012/13 Boys Hockey Section second place
- 2013 Boys Nordic Skiing conference champions
- 2013 Girls Soccer Section 7A champions, State participants
- 2016 The FIRST Robotics Competition team 4009 from Denfeld won the Lake Superior Regional to qualify for the FIRST Championship.
- 2016 Nathaniel Rosholt (class of 2016) goes to State in Nordic Skiing
- 2016 Boys Soccer Section 7A champions, State participants
- 2017 Benjamin Emmel (class of 2018) goes to state in Boys' Golf
- 2017 Quinten Rimolde (sophomore) and Nick Anderson (senior) qualified for the State Debate Tournament
- 2018 Boys Soccer Lake Superior Conference Champions, Section 7A Champions, State Participants
- 2019 Baseball, Section Champs, Goes to State
- 2019 Track, Blake Eaton (Class of '22) sets State Record in 200 meter dash, wheelchair division at 35.70 seconds.
- 2020 Boys Soccer, Section 7A Champions. No State games due to COVID-19 restrictions. Keegan Chastey (Class of '21) named a Minnesota Mr. Soccer Finalist
- 2021 Track. Blake Eaton (Class of '22), wins 2 State Titles: 100 and 200 meter wheelchair dashes.
- 2021 Golf. Nate Burke (Class of '21) qualifies for State.
- 2021 Boys Soccer, Section 7AA runners-up. Joe Eklund (class of '22) named a Minnesota Mr. Soccer Finalist
- 2022 Boys Soccer, Section 7AA runners-up. Parker Chastey (class of '23) named a Minnesota Mr. Soccer Finalist
- 2023 Speech. Madeline Watts (Class of '23) and Reagan Kern (Class of '25) are both Section 7AA Champions in the categories of serious drama and serious prose, respectively, and head to State competition.
- 2023 Robotics team headed to Nationals/World Championships in April.
- 2024-25 Boys Basketball, Section 7AAA Champions, State Participants
- 2025 Boys Soccer, Section 7AA Champions, State Participants
- 2026 Serious Drama, Paisley Kern (Class of 2029), Section 7AA Champion, State Participant

== Notable alumni ==
- Greg Anderson, NHRA driver, class of 1979
- Dorothy Arnold (Olson), actress and first wife of Joe DiMaggio, class of 1935
- Mike Colalillo, Congressional Medal of Honor recipient (left school at age 16)
- Roger Grimsby, television news anchor, class of 1946
- C. J. Ham, football player
- Lenny Lane, professional wrestler, class of 1989
- Russ Method, football player
- Richard F. Palmer, newspaper editor and Minnesota state senator
- Barbara Rotvig, baseball player
- Robb Stauber, ice hockey goaltender, class of 1986
- Pete Stauber, Politician, MN 8th District, US House of Representatives
- Blake Eaton, 2026 Winter Paralympian. Downhill Skiing: Sitting: Alpine and Super G. Class of 2022
