= John R. Crews =

- Born: March 8, 1923; Golden, Oklahoma, US
- Died: September 25, 1999 (aged 76); Oklahoma City, Oklahoma, US
- Burial place: Resthaven Gardens Cemetery, Oklahoma City, Oklahoma
- Military career
- Allegiance: United States of America
- Branch: United States Army
- Rank: Staff Sergeant
- Units: 2nd Battalion, 253rd Infantry Regiment, 63rd Infantry Division
- Conflicts: World War II
- Awards: Medal of Honor; Silver Star

John R. Crews (March 8, 1923 – September 25, 1999) was a United States Army soldier and a recipient of the United States military's highest decoration—the Medal of Honor—for his actions at the Battle of Buchhof and Stein am Kocher in World War II.

== Biography ==
Crews joined the Army from Bowlegs, Oklahoma in 1942, and by April 8, 1945, was serving as a staff sergeant in Company F, 253rd Infantry Regiment, 63rd Infantry Division. On that day, near Stein-am-Kocher, Germany, Crews single-handedly destroyed two German emplacements.

Crews died at age 76 and was buried in Resthaven Gardens Cemetery, Oklahoma City, Oklahoma.

He is the great-uncle to author Kambri Crews.

== Medal of Honor citation ==
Staff Sergeant Crews' official Medal of Honor citation reads:

He displayed conspicuous gallantry and intrepidity at the risk of his life above and beyond the call of duty on 8 April 1945 near Lobenbacherhof, Germany. As his company was advancing toward the village under heavy fire, an enemy machinegun and automatic rifle with rifle support opened upon it from a hill on the right flank. Seeing that his platoon leader had been wounded by their fire, S/Sgt. Crews, acting on his own initiative, rushed the strongpoint with 2 men of his platoon. Despite the fact that 1 of these men was killed and the other was badly wounded, he continued his advance up the hill in the face of terrific enemy fire. Storming the well-dug-in position single-handedly, he killed 2 of the crew of the machinegun at pointblank range with his M 1 rifle and wrested the gun from the hands of the German whom he had already wounded. He then with his rifle charged the strongly emplaced automatic rifle. Although badly wounded in the thigh by crossfire from the remaining enemy, he kept on and silenced the entire position with his accurate and deadly rifle fire. His actions so unnerved the remaining enemy soldiers that 7 of them surrendered and the others fled. His heroism caused the enemy to concentrate on him and permitted the company to move forward into the village.

== See also ==
- List of Medal of Honor recipients for World War II
