= Kambri Crews =

American storyteller (born 1971)

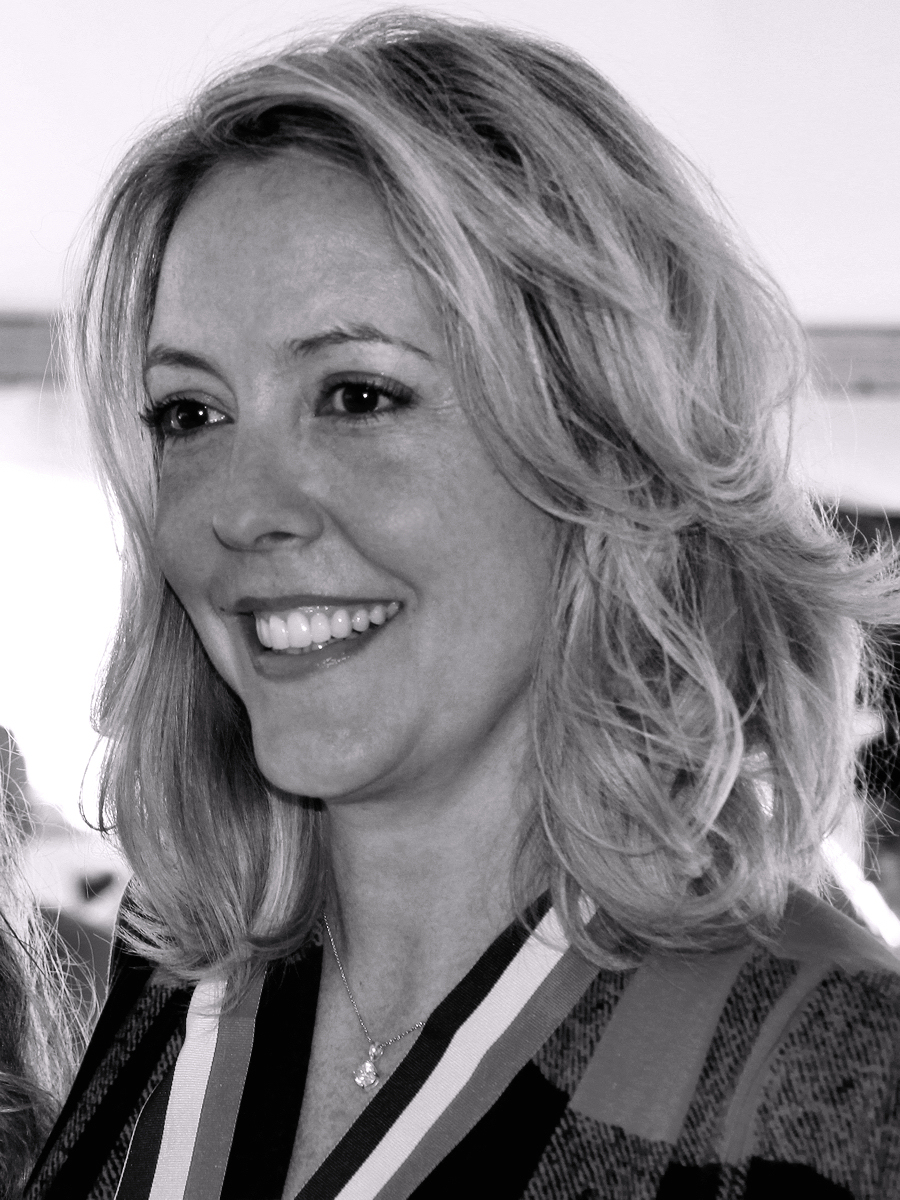
- Crews at the 2012 Texas Book Festival
- Born: June 22, 1971 (age 55); Tulsa, Oklahoma, U.S.
- Occupations: Writer, producer, publicist
- Spouse: Christian Finnegan (2006-Present)
- Writing career
- Genre: Non-fiction
- Notable work: Burn Down the Ground: A Memoir

Kambri Crews (born June 22, 1971) is an American comedic storyteller based in New York City and author of The New York Times bestseller Burn Down the Ground: A Memoir, a book about her chaotic childhood with deaf parents. Crews was spotlighted as a top comedy choice in the May 19, 2008 edition of Time Out, which called her an "emerging monologist." Crews has also been referred to as a "world-class storyteller".

== Career ==
As a CODA, Crews' storytelling is notable for mixing conventional monologues with the use of American Sign Language; and for finding the humor in even the most hair-raising of childhood memories. Crews' tales typically focus on her childhood in the deep woods of Montgomery, Texas, where she lived in everything from a tin shed to a trailer to the tin shed again.

Crews has performed at most of NYC's top indie comedy venues, including Joe's Pub, Upright Citizens Brigade Theatre, Gotham Comedy Club, Broadway Comedy Club, The Peoples Improv Theater, The Bitter End, Comix NY, and famed literary venue KGB (bar); and at such shows at The Moth, Risk!, Seth Herzog's Sweet, UCBT's School Night, Liam McEneaney's Tell Your Friends, and the NY/LA comedy show Mortified.

In October 2007, Crews created the alternative performance space Ochi's Lounge. Located in the lower level of Comix, Ochi's regularly featured open mics, produced shows and guest appearances by stars such as David Cross, Zach Galifianakis, Jim Gaffigan, John Oliver, Mike Daisey, Adam Wade and her husband Christian Finnegan. In addition to overseeing the performance space, she owns her PR and production company Ballyhoo Promotions. She is an Executive Producer of the ECNY Awards and served as the Executive Director of Marketing and Publicity for the comedy nightclub Comix NY from the club's inception in September 2006. She resigned from that post in September 2010 when Ochi's Lounge was closed by new owners of Comix and became the comedy booker for the 92nd Street Y's Tribeca location.

Since October 2014, Crews has owned and operated the performance venue Q.E.D. Astoria in Astoria, Queens. The venue has featured Al Franken, Leslie Jones, Kate McKinnon, Pete Davidson, Chris Gethard, Todd Barry, Kevin Allison, Judy Gold, Dave Hill, Ted Alexandro, Judah Friedlander, Christian Finnegan, Jim Gaffigan, Adam Conover, Alexandria Ocasio-Cortez, Gary Gulman, Michelle Wolf, Moody McCarthy, Frank Conniff, Jay Pharoah, Laurie Kilmartin, Ophira Eisenberg, Josh Gondelman, John Early, Hasan Minaj, Morgan Murphy, John Fugelsang, Janeane Garofalo, Mike Lawrence, Aparna Nancherla, Jo Firestone, Tom Scharpling, Myq Kaplan, Baratunde Thurson, Sasheer Zamata, Michelle Buteau, and Mike Doughty.

== Personal life ==
Most prominent in Crews' stories is her father, who was the seventh of ten children of farmers, born completely deaf, and "the black sheep of his very strict Christian family." The summer before Crews entered her senior year at Richland High School, her father attacked her mother. Crews was able to stop the attack and dial 911. He was arrested for aggravated assault with a deadly weapon. At seventeen years of age and still in high school, she married a 23-year-old man in the US Navy with her mother’s legal permission since Crews was under the age of consent.

On June 29, 2002, her father was arrested for the attempted murder of his girlfriend; an act for which he was sentenced to 20 years in a Texas prison, and died on July 10, 2020. Crews' memoir includes prose versions of many of her performance pieces. She also provides updates about her father in her blog, LoveDaddy.org, and an essay about her childhood was published by Hillary Carlip on FreshYarn.com.

She is the great-niece to Medal of Honor recipient John R. Crews.
