= Engineer Light Ponton Company =

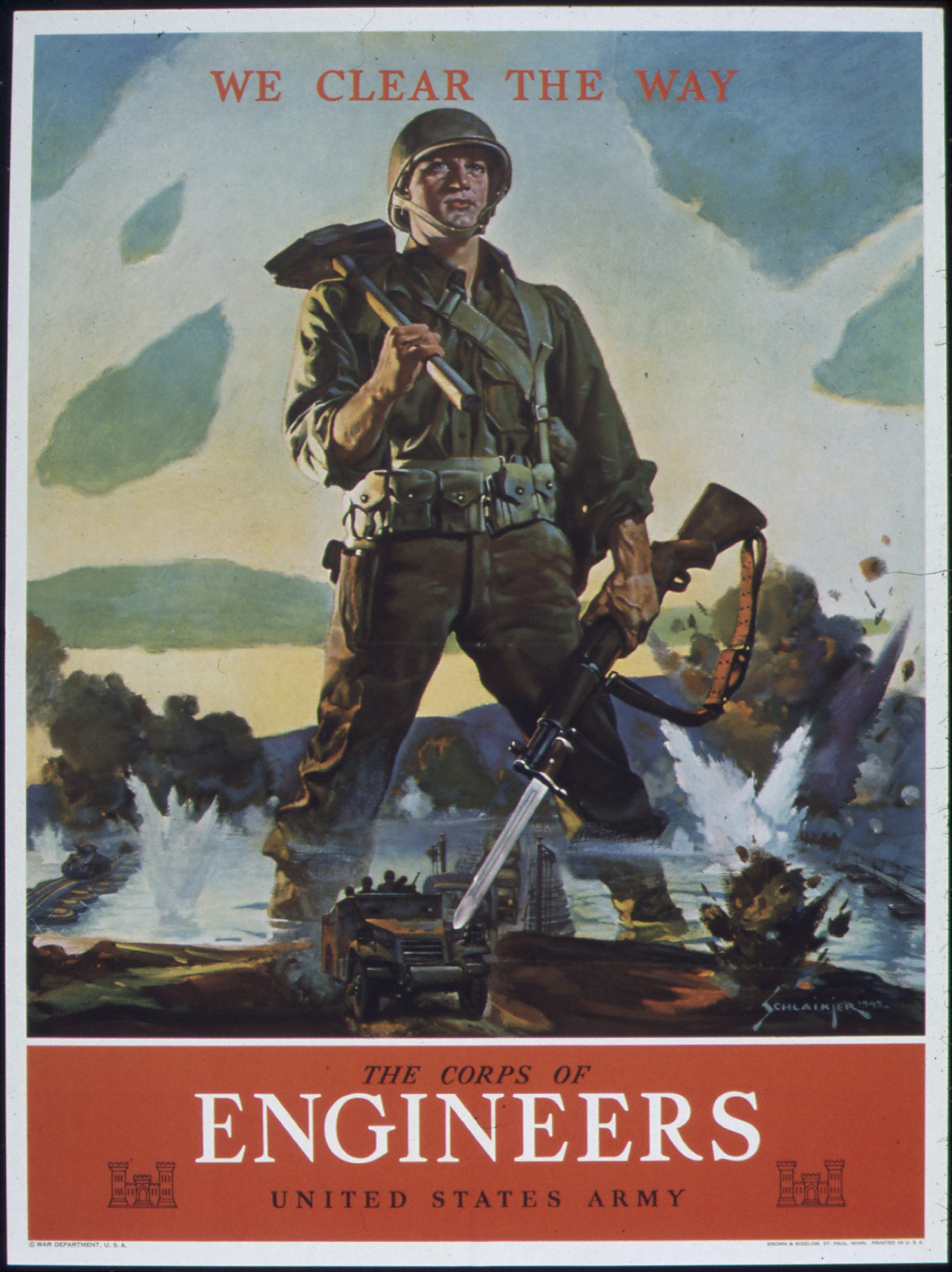
World War II recruiting poster for the U.S. Army Corps of Engineers

An Engineer Light Ponton Company was a combat engineer company of the United States Army that served with U.S. Army ground forces during World War II. It was primarily a highly mobile pontoon bridge construction unit, though it also provided both M2 assault boats and a selection of infantry support bridging, ferries, and rafts.

== Mission ==
The combat engineer unit was organized and trained to transport and maintain its stream-crossing equipage, to construct floating bridges and rafts with this equipage, to guard and maintain completed bridges, to regulate traffic thereon, and to dismantle bridges and rafts. They are responsible for construction of floating bridges and rafts assisted by general engineer troops. Light ponton companies may be attached to divisions engaged in stream-crossing operations in accordance with the tactical situation.

== Capabilities ==
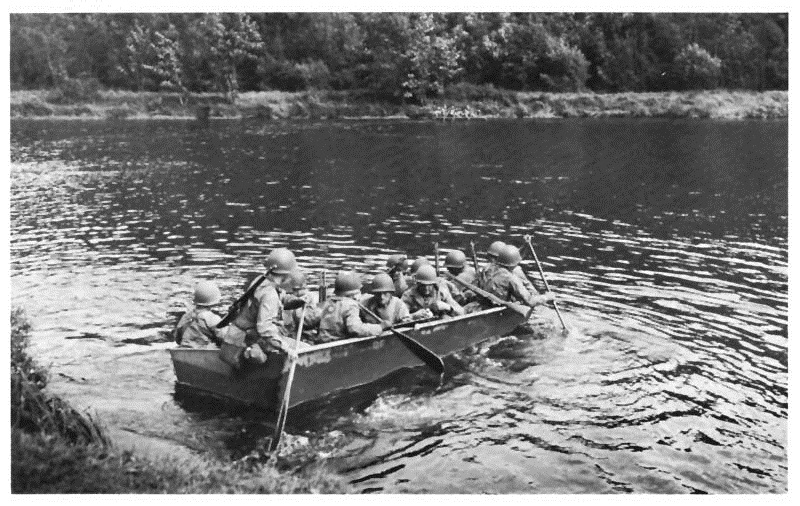
Combat engineers ferried infantry and special forces troops in craft such as this M2 assault boat

Company capabilities included, but were not limited to:

- Bridge construction (mobile, floating, fixed)
- Conducting river crossings by ponton/raft, motor-powered assault boats
- Demolition
- Placing/de-arming munitions, including mines
- Port & harbor maintenance and rehabilitation, including beachheads
- Vehicle maintenance
- Fighting as infantry when needed

== Organization ==
The light ponton company consisted of a headquarters platoon, two bridge platoons, and a light equipage platoon. Its equipment included:

- Two units of pneumatic 10 short tons (9.1 t) bridge equipment (M3)
- Two units of footbridge (M1938) equipment
- Four ferry set, No. 1, Infantry Support
- Twelve raft, set No. 1, Infantry Support
- Seventy assault boats (M2)

=== Headquarters Platoon ===
This platoon consisted of company headquarters and a service and repair section. Company headquarters-officer personnel consisted of the company commander and an administrative officer. Enlisted personnel handle routine administration, mess, and supply functions for the company. Service and repair section.-This section was commanded by a lieutenant. Personnel includes enlisted specialists for maintenance and repair of motor vehicles and heavy mechanical equipment, and operators of mechanized equipment and vehicles.

=== Bridge Platoon ===
The bridge platoon consisted of platoon headquarters and a ponton section. Platoon headquarters-The platoon headquarters supervised and controlled activities of the ponton section, and was responsible for installation, maintenance, and operation of its field telephone equipment. The ponton section transports one unit of bridge equipage.

=== Light Equipage Platoon ===
This platoon consisted of platoon headquarters, an assault boat section, a raft section, and a footbridge section. The platoon headquarters was responsible for the care and safe transportation of the equipage assigned to the platoon. The assault boat section cared for and transported M2 assault boats. The raft section cared for and transported the infantry support rafts and ferry sets. The footbridge section was responsible for maintaining and transporting footbridge units.

=== Equipment ===
The company was equipped with basic engineer tool sets, including a motorized air compressor, a truck-mounted crane, and tractor-mounted angledozers. They also supported stream-crossing equipment stocked in engineer depots. This included:

- M3 pneumatic bridge equipage, two units; or two units of M1938 10-ton ponton bridge equipage.
- Footbridge, M1938, one unit.
- Infantry support raft, twelve units.
- Assault boats M2, seventy.
- Infantry support ferry, four sets.
- Signal equipment includes radios and telephones.

== Preparation and responsibilities ==
=== Transportation ===
The light ponton company had sufficient organic transportation for simultaneous movement of all personnel, equipment, and supplies.

=== Armament ===
Individual weapons included carbine and pistol. Supporting weapons included .30 caliber heavy machine guns and .50 caliber machine guns.

=== Training ===
Unit training included care and operation of transportation and heavy equipment assigned to the company, and nomenclature, use, repair, and maintenance of bridge equipage and light stream-crossing equipage. Engineers were trained in use of pontoon equipage including employment of outboard motors and training in repair of equipage is confined to repairs readily accomplished.

They engaged in frequent drills and field training in safe and rapid transportation of bridge equipage to crossing sites; in unloading and launching of equipage; in construction of bridges and rafts; in operational maintenance, care, guarding, and dismantling of bridges and rafts; and in loading of component parts on company vehicles.

Special effort was made in training to keep the bridge clear of drift and other floating objects, especial attention being given to anchor cables. Training in guarding bridges is of vital importance to insure uninterrupted flow of traffic.

Training all personnel in road movements including organization of columns, movements under cover of darkness, secrecy and discipline, security, and other fundamental principles prescribed in Army Field Manual FM 25-10. They were also trained in concealment of vehicles.

Combat training included the use of individual and supporting weapons for local security. Proficient gun crews were to be developed for employment of machine guns under defensive combat conditions.

=== Duties ===
The light ponton company normally performed the following duties when in bivouac:

1. Maintained local security against hostile air and ground attacks.
2. Took camouflage measures for concealment of transport and equipment.
3. Maintained transport and equipment ready for employment at all times.
4. Periodically tested equipment to eliminate parts which deteriorated.
5. Reinforced engineer depot personnel.
6. Maintained or repaired roads near the ponton park.
7. Assisted nearby engineer units in performance of their duties.

The light ponton company normally performed the following duties when not in bivouac:

1. Route reconnaissance, and reconnaissance for ponton bridge crossings.
2. Moved its equipment forward to the site or sites of stream crossings, allowing ample time for moving out of bivouac and for approach march.
3. Unloaded and concealed vehicles.
4. Constructed bridges and rafts using M3 pneumatic or M1938 ponton bridge equipage, and infantry support rafts.
5. Maintained and repaired floating bridges and rafts.
6. Operated raft ferries.
7. Guarded completed bridge.
8. Regulated traffic on bridge.
9. Dismantled and loaded bridge equipage on trucks and trailers.
10. Provided for hasty demolition of bridge.

== See also ==
- United States Army Corps of Engineers
- 549th Engineer Light Ponton Company
- Pontoon Bridge
