= 289th Engineer Combat Battalion (United States) =

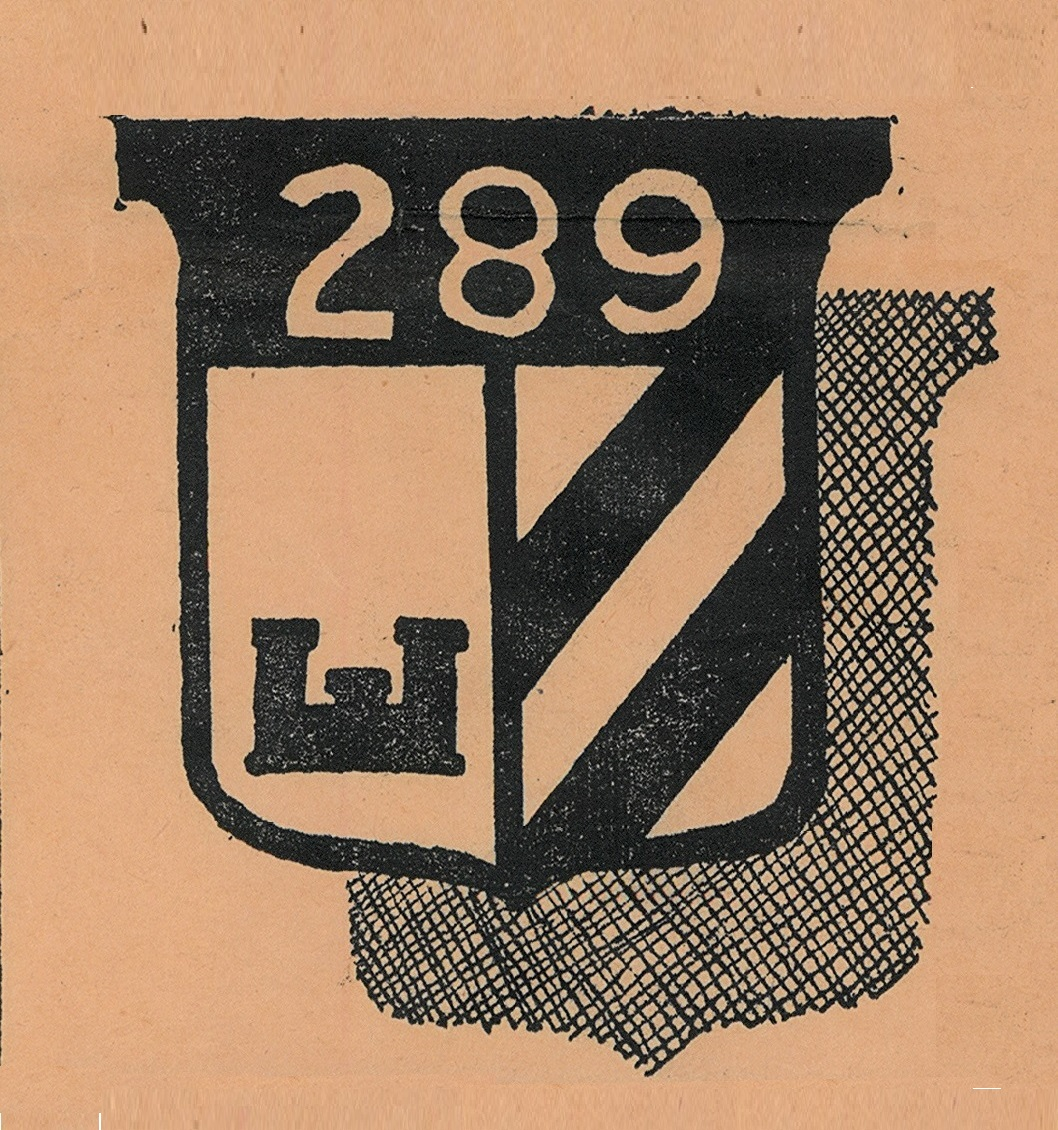
- Shoulder sleeve insignia
- Active: 1943–46
- Country: United States
- Branch: United States Army
- Type: Combat engineer
- Role: Combat support
- Size: Battalion
- Engagements: World War II: Ardennes-Alsace Campaign; Rhineland Campaign; Central Europe Campaign

Commanders
- Notable commanders: Lt. Col. Linnel Wallace

The 289th Engineer Combat Battalion was a combat engineer battalion of the United States Army during World War II. It served under XXI Corps of the Seventh Army in action mainly in France and Germany in 1944 and 1945. It received campaign credit for participation in the Ardennes-Alsace campaign (Battle of the Bulge), Rhineland campaign, and the Invasion of Germany.

The 289th's principal combat assignments in the Alsace and Rhineland included serving as infantry to protect an important road junction near Saint-Avold, France, deployment under the command of the French First Army in clearing German troops from the Colmar Pocket during the Nazi Operation Nordwind offensive; ferrying assault troops across the Saar River near Saarbrücken Germany; escorting an ambulance corps across the Rhine at Worms near Mannheim; and ferrying troops and equipment across the Neckar River near Heidelberg.

Following these the battalion moved east towards Würzburg to support the assault of that city. In the latter stages of the War it campaigned south and southeast through communities straddling the states of Baden-Württemberg and Bavaria. Company B continued on assisting rapidly moving armor in the Seventh Army's race to head off German entrenchment in a feared National Redoubt and seal off Alpine passes to Nazi escape.

By early May forward elements of the battalion were spread as far afield as Austria and northern Italy. VE-Day found the Headquarters & Supply company and remaining components of the 289th in Göppingen near Stuttgart.

The 289th served occupation duty in three locations in southwest Germany before beginning its return to the United States via Antwerp, Belgium, in August 1945.

== History ==
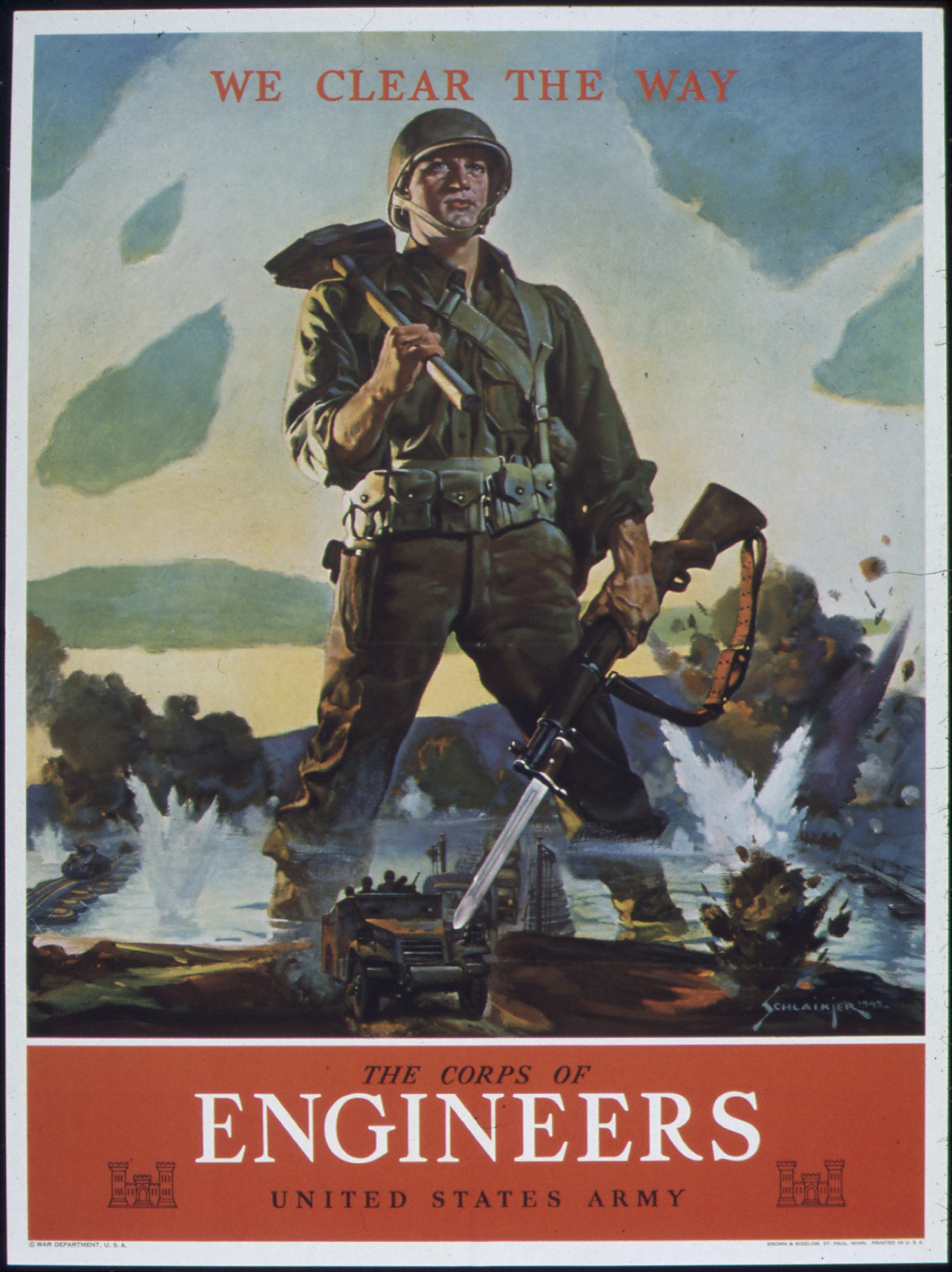
World War II recruiting poster for the U.S. Army Corps of Engineers

The 289th Engineer Combat Battalion was constituted at Camp Joseph T. Robinson, Little Rock, Arkansas, in December 1942. A cadre from the 299th Engineer Combat Battalion was detached to Camp Robinson to form its core, establishing Companies A, B, C, and HQ and Service. After training, the 289th left New York Port of Embarkation for the European Theater of Operations (ETO) on 22 October 1944. Upon arrival at Bristol on 1 November, it debarked for training in Weston-super-Mare. On 28 December it departed Southampton for Le Havre, landing 31 December.

In the ETO the 289th was attached directly to the XXI Corps of the Seventh Army, U.S. Sixth Army Group. As a combat service support unit operating at corps level, the 289th was deployed as needed in whole or part, with companies and platoons often temporarily attached to other field commands. Thus it was common for elements of the latter to be far afoot of the unit's official location wherever its Headquarters & Supply company was stationed. (Note: No official history of the 289th Engineer Combat Battalion was ever compiled, and the individual records of those who served were destroyed in the 1973 National Personnel Records Center fire in Overland, Missouri. Its activities have been reconstructed from extant records, including a Summary History of the 289th Engineer Combat Battalion - WW II, an unofficial unit history compiled by commanding officer Lt. Col. Linnel Wallace on file at the U.S. Army Heritage and Education Center, oral and video histories of unit members preserved as part of the Library of Congress Veterans History Project, and information contained in the "Travels of the 289th" compiled by Technician Five John T. Bartolomeo, as well as cross-referencing the histories and available records of units the 289th was detached to, supported, or was engaged along with in the ETO.)

Upon arrival in France the battalion traveled southeast by rail in 40&8s, stopping in Forges-les-Eaux and Lunéville before arriving at Fort de la Mouche in Epinal. In mid-January the unit was ordered to serve as infantry defending a key road junction near Saint-Avold connecting the heavily contested French fortress city of Metz, the Alsatian capital of Strasbourg, and the German city of Saarbrücken. The battalion's 30-cal and 50-cal gun crews were deployed to the north to strengthen a badly over-stretched Seventh Army line depleted when elements were detached to fill the vacuum created when General George Patton's Third Army raced north to the Ardennes to relieve the besieged 101st Airborne at Bastogne in the Battle of the Bulge. (Note: This combat action earned the 289th the Ardennes-Alsace Battle Credit.)

In late January and early February the 289th was briefly deployed as part of XXI Corps under the command of French General Jean de Lattre de Tassigny's French First Army in its effort to clear attacking German troops from the Colmar Pocket during the Operation Nordwind offensive. Nordwind's intent was to drive a wedge through the weakened Allied defenses in the Alsace to prevent reinforcement to the north against its main thrust toward the coveted Allied port of Antwerp and badly needed supplies staged there. Strasbourg was successfully defended, and XXI Corp restored to the US Seventh Army.

Immediately following this the 289th moved near Saarbrücken, where it refined its training and acquired combat engineering materials in preparation for joining in Operation Undertone, the Allied invasion of the Saarland set to commence on 15 March. Battalion engineers ferried infantry across the Saar in the breaching of the vaunted Siegfried Line 17–20 March; followed by support over the Rhine near Mannheim 30 March; and ferry and pontoon bridge construction assistance over the Neckar near Heidelberg 31 March. From there the 289th moved successively eastward closer to Würzburg through 18 April on the heels of the retreating Germans.

It then pivoted south through badly ravaged Crailsheim in several short encampments over the next three weeks, facing diminishing German resistance in areas then falling well behind rapidly advancing front lines. In late April Company B was tasked to support the fast-moving 12th Armored Division in its drive deep into Bavaria to prevent the establishment of a German National Redoubt. With engineers building bridges as fast as the Wehrmacht and Waffen SS could blow them, the 12th roared toward the finish in the Seventh Army's race to the Alps to seal off the Brenner Pass to Nazi escape; a prize nabbed at the wire by the rival 103rd Infantry Division on 4 May. VE Day was celebrated four days later with H&S company stationed in Göppingen, 20 miles southeast of Stuttgart, and forward elements of the 289th having sprawled as far afield as Austria and northern Italy before war's end.

Occupation duty included being rushed to secure the Kaufbeuren Air Base in southern Bavaria when it was revealed as the final location of the Nazi Party's top secret FA signals intelligence and cryptanalytic agency. Perceived crucial by TICOM, the U.S. intelligence and technology gathering organization, its top secret records forced the 289th into the unusual role of military police. Next was a brief move to secure Neckarsulm, home of NSU Motorenwerke's Sd.Kfz. 2 production, followed by an extended stay in Mosbach, site of an underground Daimler-Benz airplane engine factory codenamed "Goldfisch".

Remaining there into August 1945, the 289th was transferred via train through the Netherlands to Belgium to ship out for deployment to the Pacific Theater in preparation for the invasion of Japan. It departed Antwerp 14 August 1945, and was abreast of the White Cliffs of Dover in the English Channel when the announcement of the Japanese surrender on VJ Day, 15 August, was broadcast to all aboard. The transport was then re-routed to the United States, and arrived at Boston Port of Embarkation on 28 August. Members of the unit were processed through Camp Myles Standish and detached to bases nearest their homes to be demobilized.

The unit itself remained active, serving as a shell for repatriating troops as part of Operation Magic Carpet at least into January 1946.

== Capabilities ==
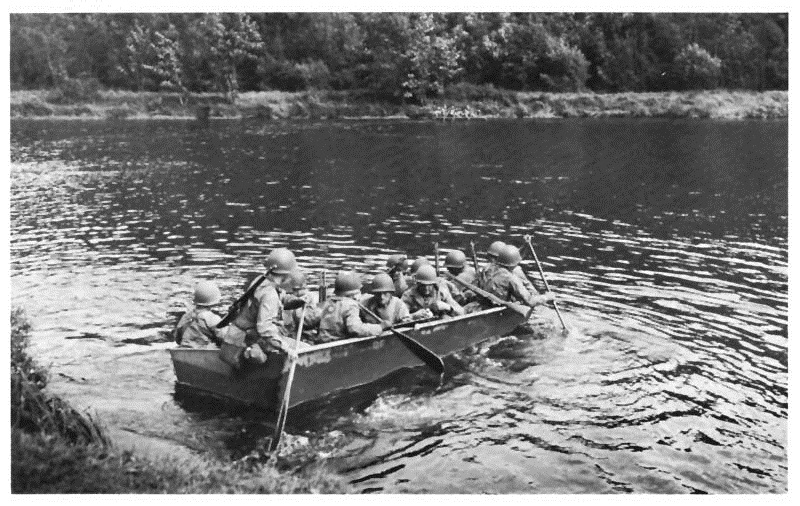
Combat engineers ferrying infantry in M2 assault boat

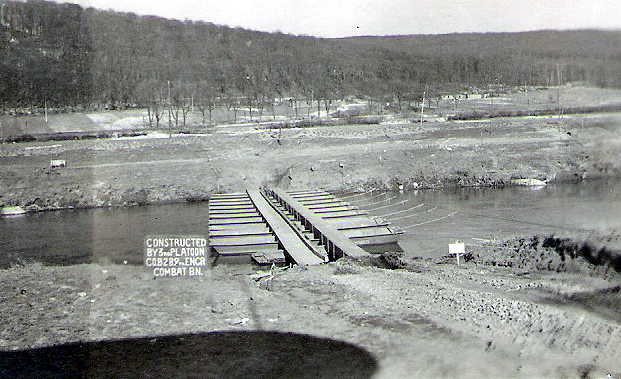
Infantry support bridge over Saar River erected by 289th Engineers at Volklingen between 18 and 20 March 1945

As a combat engineer battalion, the 289th furnished combat support essential to sustaining operating forces in the theater of war. These spanned such diverse activities as construction, demolition, sanitation, map production, minefield clearing, and unit intelligence.

Combat engineer battalions also fielded defensive .30 cal. and .50 cal. machine gun squads, anti-tank rocket and grenade launchers, and were required to fight as infantry when needed.

The range of services provided included but was not limited to:

- Bridge (mobile, floating, fixed), rail, & road construction and maintenance
- Conducting river crossings by ponton/raft, motor-powered assault boats
- Demolition
- Placing/de-arming munitions, including mines
- Port & harbor maintenance and rehabilitation, including beachheads:

- Laying roads and unloading/loading supplies, vehicles & personnel from transport and cargo ships

- Camouflage
- Water supply and sanitation
- Map production
- Vehicle maintenance
- Establishing/maintaining supply and ammunition dumps
- Building barracks, depots, and similar structures
- Rescue & road patrols, bridge and road reconnaissance
- Clearing of debris and wreckage
- Serving as infantry when needed

Among those carried out in action by the 289th were the clearing of minefields, removal of demolition charges, and disarming of anti-personnel munitions and booby traps; deployment and operation of assault boats; and the construction of various pontoon bridges, including M1 treadways, and modular steel truss Bailey bridges.

== Actions ==
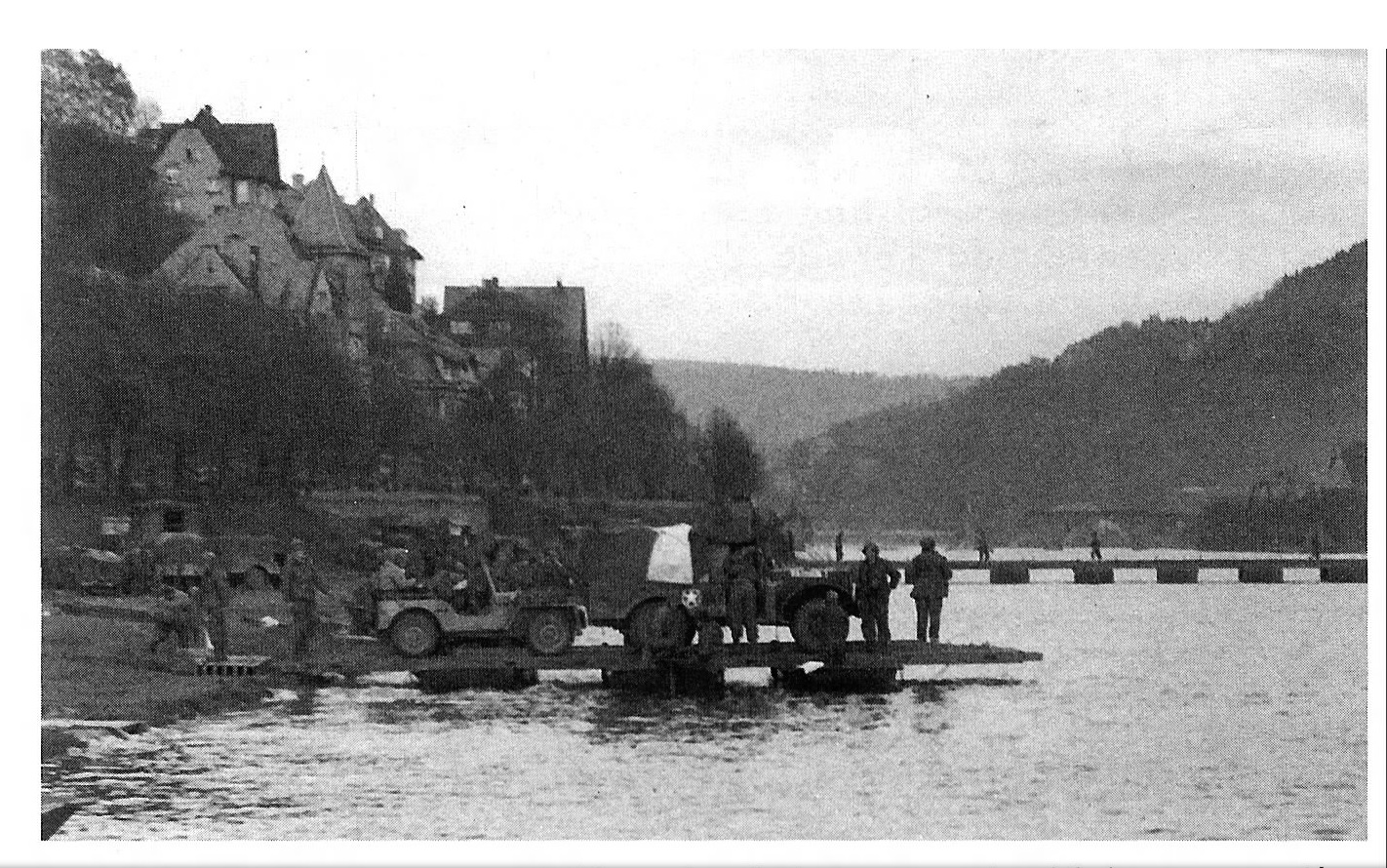
The 289th Engineer Combat Battalion ferrying troops and vehicles over the Neckar River at Heidelberg, 31 March 1945

Principal combat actions involving the 289th Engineers include:

- Serving as infantry in support of XXI Corps troops holding the German line near Saint-Avold
- Ferrying troops of the 276th Infantry Battalion of the 70th Infantry Division in assault boats across the Saar River at Völklingen against the German 1st Army, followed by laying an infantry support bridge, which led to breaching the Siegfried Line and the Allied occupation of Saarbrücken.
- Escorting an ambulance corps across a temporary bridge over the Rhine at Worms near Mannheim under duress of German artillery fire.
- Ferrying troops and equipment of the 63rd Infantry Division across the Neckar River near Heidelberg while pontoon bridges were laid after the retreating German army had demolished the city's historic span.
- Aiding the 12th Armored Division in rapid bridge construction during the Seventh Army's race into southern Bavaria to prevent the establishment of a German National Redoubt and seal off alpine passes to Nazi escape.

== Timeline ==
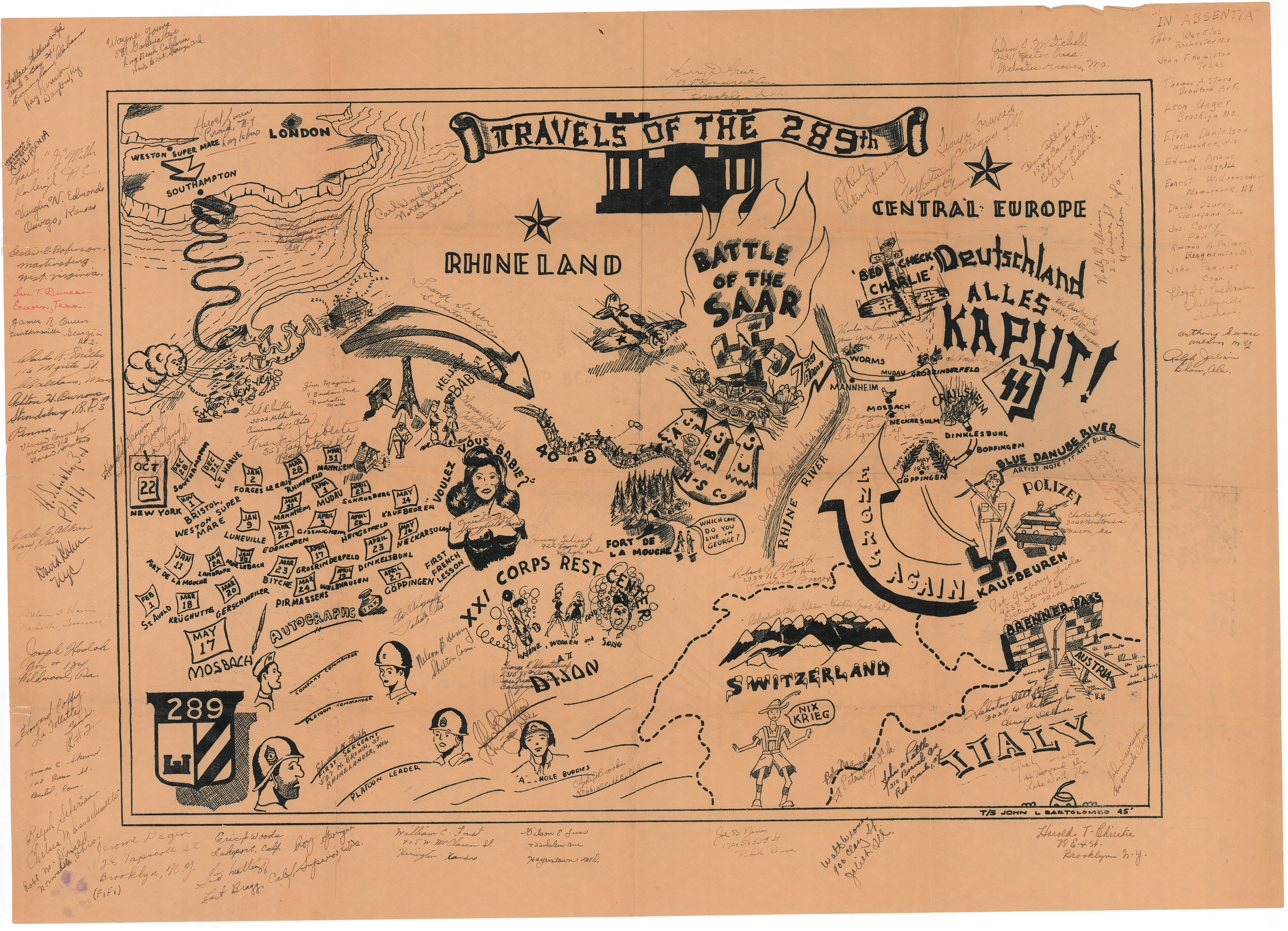
Travels of the 289th by mapmaker Technician Five John T. Bartolomeo, distributed to members of the Battalion commemorating the end of World War II

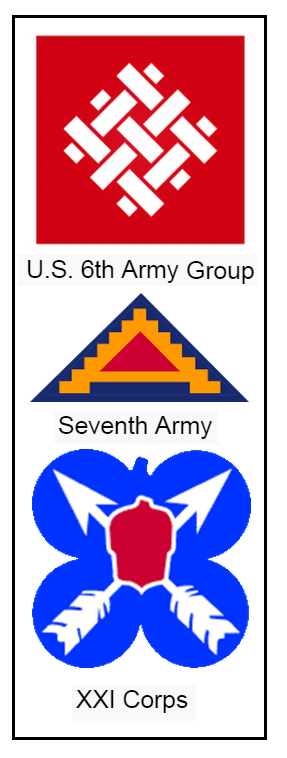

The 289th traveled as a unit from the U.S. to Saint-Avold, France. Once in the combat zone assignments frequently separated its companies or broke them into smaller outfits, often in support of other units. The travel and encampment dates below reflect the location of the battalion's Headquarters & Supply Company as established in the "Travels of the 289th":

New York

- 22 October 1944 – Depart New York POE (Note: Via Camp Kilmer, aboard SS Sea Owl)

England

- 1 November – Arrive Bristol, England (Note: Avonmouth, 5 m. NW of Bristol on the Severn)
- 2 November – Weston-super-Mare (Note: 15 m. SW of Avonmouth on Severn)
- 28 December – Depart Southampton (Note: 75 m. SE, via train. Board HMS Cheshire)

France

- 31 December – Le Havre, France (Note: 120 m. SE of Southampton. Bivouac in pup tents on frozen ground 10 m. from harbor)
- 2 January 1945 – Forges-les-Eaux (Note: 65 m. E of Le Havre, via truck transport)
- 9 January – Lunéville (Note: 235 m. slightly SE of Forges-les-Eaux, via 40 & 8s)
- 11 January – Fort de la Mouche (Note: 30 m. S of Lunéville, in Epinal)
- 24 January – Landroff (Note: 55 m. N of Epinal)
- 30 January – Merlebach (Note: 15 m. NE of Landroff, 10 m. SW of Saarbrücken)
- 1 February – St. Avold (Note: Immediately SW of and adjacent to Merlebach)

Germany

- 18 March – Krüghutte (Note: 10 m. NE of St. Avold, 2 m. S of the Saar River, 5 m. W of Alt-Saarbrücken)
- 20 March – Gersweiler (Note: 2 m. NE of Krüghutte on the S bank of the Saar midway between downtown Saarbrücken and Völklingen)

France

- 23 March – Bitche (Note: 30 m. SE of Gersweiler)

Germany

- 24 March – Pirmasens (Note: 12 m. NE of Bitche)
- 27 March – Edenkoben (Note: 25 m. slightly NE of Pirmasens)
- 28 March – Rhinefield (Note: Rheinfeld, 20 m. NE of Edenkoben, 1/2 m. west of the Rhine in Friesenheim section of Ludwigshafen)
- 31 March – Mannheim (Note: 2 m. E of Rheinfeld)
- 1 April – Mudau (Note: 30 m. E of Mannheim and 35 m. W of Würzburg. Celebrated Easter Dinner at the Mudau Hotel in Mudau, joined by the detached 1st Platoon of the colored 549th Engineer Light Pontoon Company)
- 3 April – Gissigheim (Note: Village within Königheim, 20 m. slightly NE of Mudau, 20 m. SW Würzburg))
- 17 April – Großrinderfeld (Note: 10 m. NE of Gissigheim (Konigheim), 10 m. SW of Würzburg)
- 19 April – Welbhausen (Note: Village in the district of Uffenheim, 25 m. SE of Großrinderfeld, 10 m. N of Rothenburg ob der Tauber)
- 21 April – Schrozberg (Note: 15-20 m. SW of Welbhausen)
- 22 April – Hengstfeld (Note: Village within Wallhausen, 10 m. slightly SE of Schrozberg, 5–10 m. slightly NE of Crailsheim)
- 23 April – Dinkelsbühl (Note: 15 m. SE of Wallhausen)
- 27 April – Göppingen (Note: 40 m. SW of Dinkelsbühl. According to "Travels of the 289th" the unit passed through Bopfingen (35 m. slightly NE, near Nördlingen) between Dinkelsbühl and Göppingen. Bartolomeo's mapping conventions suggests it bivouacked there, but there is no individual entry for it in the calendar section of the artwork.)

Post VE-Day Occupation Duty:

- 14 May – Kaufbeuren (Note: 75 m. SE of Göppingen, 25 m. N of Füssen, Austria. Final location of top secret FA (Nazi Party) signals intelligence and cryptanalytic agency)
- 16 May – Neckarsulm (Note: 110 m. NW of Kaufbeuren, 3 m. N of Heilbronn. Home of NSU Motorenwerke's Sd.Kfz. 2 production)
- 18 May – Mosbach (Note: 15 m. slightly NW of Neckarshulm, 20 m. E of Heidelberg. Site of a Daimler-Benz underground airplane engine factory, codenamed "Goldfisch")
- 14 August – Depart Antwerp, Belgium (Note: 230 m. NW of Mosbach, via truck transport. To Camp Tophat. Board SS Claymont Victory)
- 28 August Arrive Boston Port of Embarkation (Note: Troops processed at Camp Myles Standish)

== Campaign credit ==
- Ardennes-Alsace Battle Credit
- Rhineland
- Central Europe

== See also ==
- XXI Corps
- Seventh Army
- Sixth United States Army Group
- 63rd Infantry
- 70th Infantry
- 549th Engineer Light Ponton Company
- Operation Nordwind
- United States Army Corps of Engineers
