= Goatley boat =

Collapsible boat built for military use

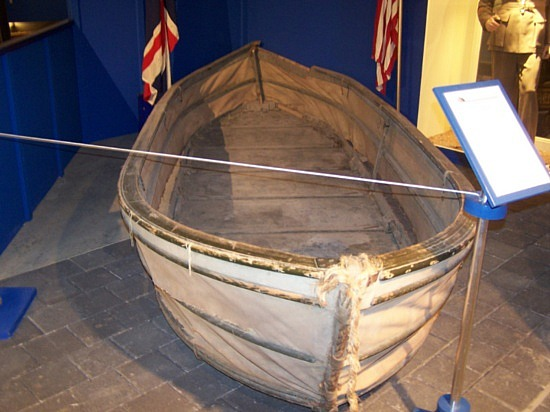
Goatley collapsible boat

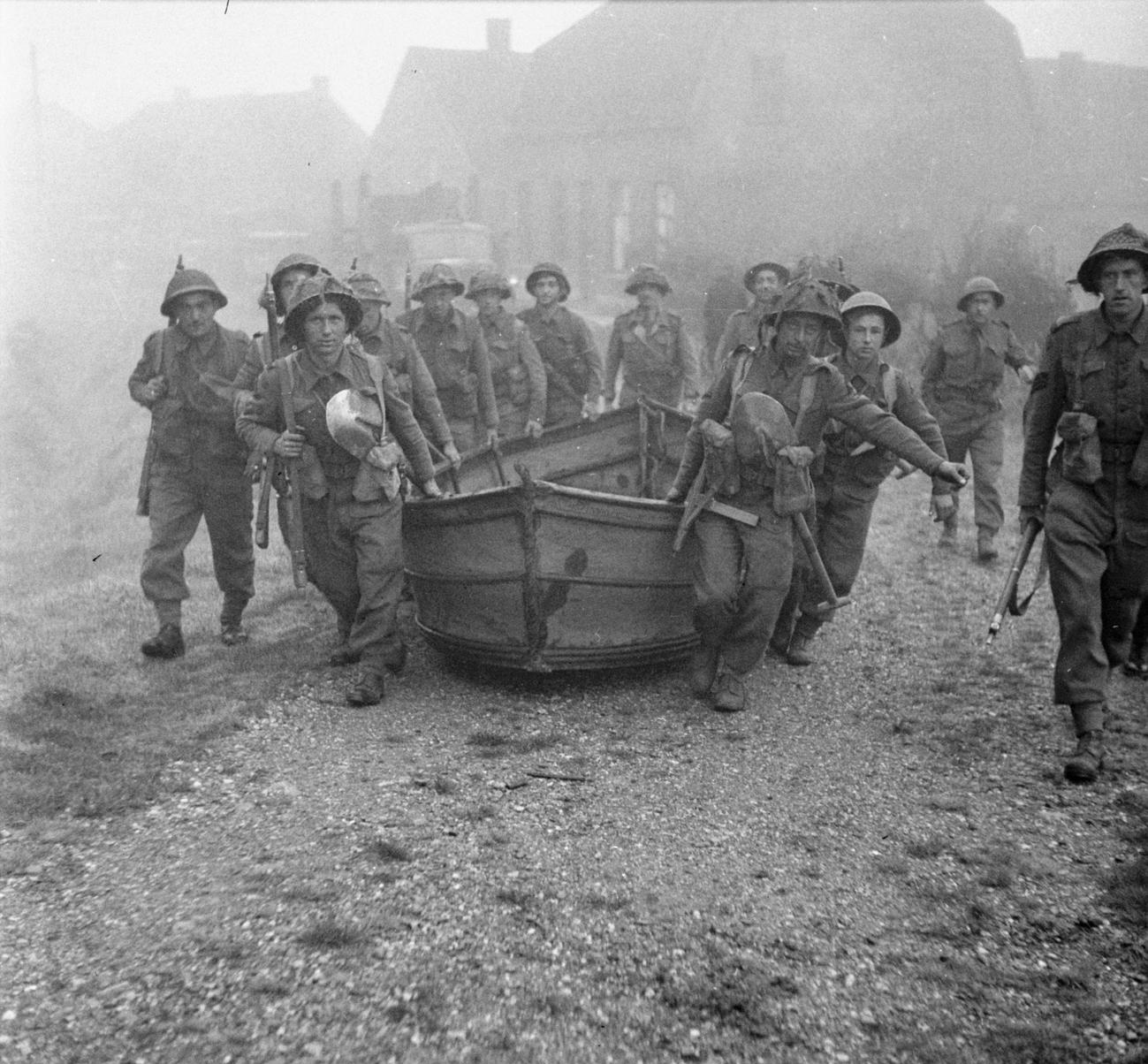
Goatley collapsible boat

The Goatley boat was a collapsible boat built for military use. The boat had a wooden bottom and canvas sides, could carry ten men and weighed around 330 lb (150 kg). Assembly time was estimated at two minutes with two men. The boat was named after the designer, Fred Goatley, of Saunders-Roe and used in commando and other operations by the British Forces during the Second World War.

Approximately 1,000 Goatley boats were ordered by the War Office during the Second World War.

== See also ==
- Operation Aquatint
- Assault boat
- Landing Craft Rubber Small
- Landing Craft Rubber Large
- Rigid Raider
- Mk 6 Assault Boat
- Combat Rubber Raiding Craft
