= XXI Corps (United States) =

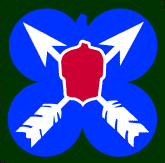
- Shoulder sleeve insignia of XXI Corps
- Active: 2 December 1943–30 September 1945; 5 August 1957–5 June 1970
- Country: United States of America
- Branch: United States Army
- Role: Headquarters
- Size: Corps
- Engagements: World War II; Rhineland; Ardennes-Alsace; Central Europe

Commanders
- Notable commanders: Frank W. Milburn; Jean de Lattre de Tassigny; Ralph C. Cooper; Van H. Bond; Harry L. Hillyard

Insignia
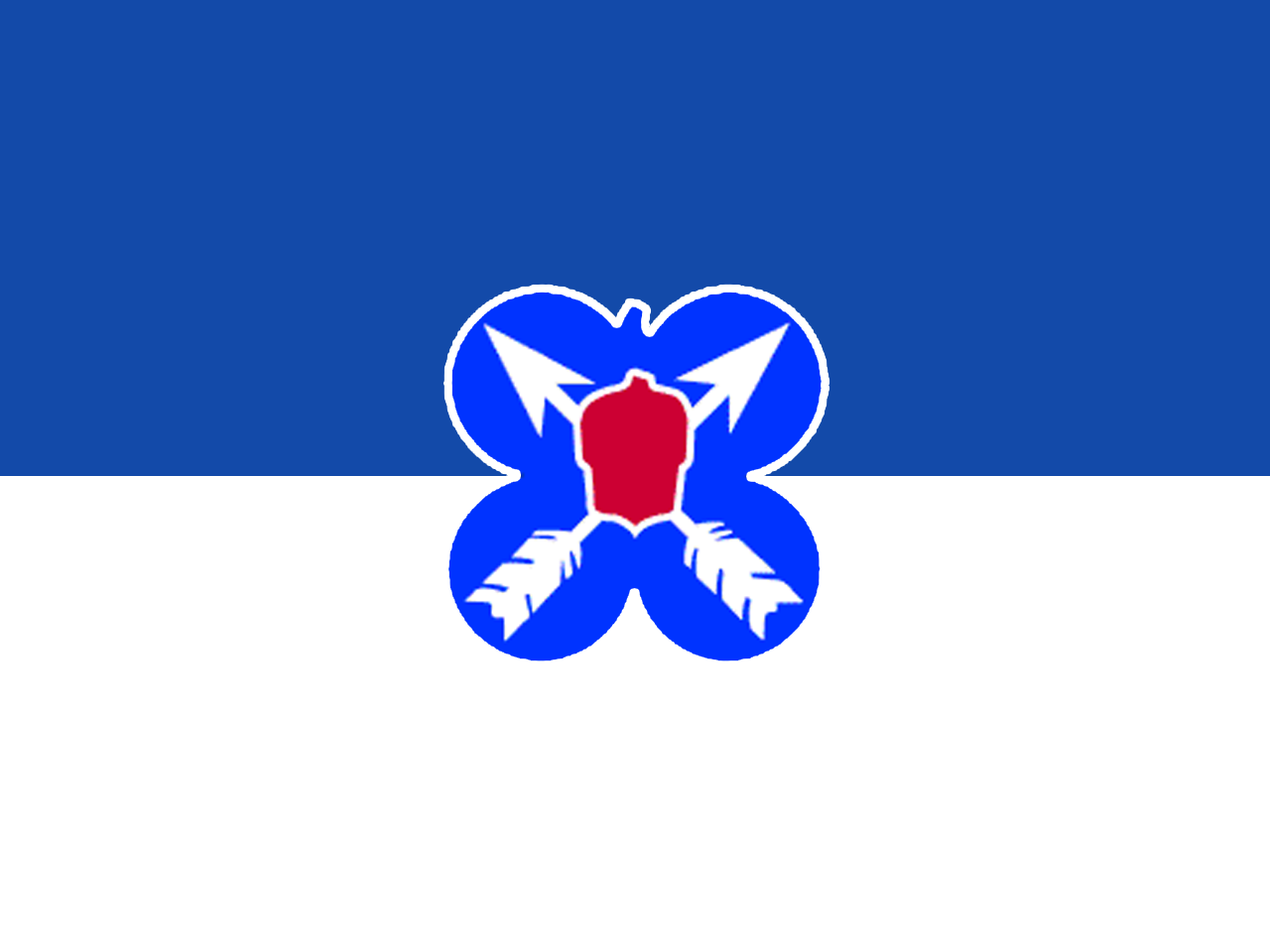
- XXI Corps Flag

The XXI Corps was a corps of the U.S. Army during World War II. It was constituted on 2 December 1943, and activated on 6 December 1943 at Camp Polk, Louisiana. XXI Corps fought for 116 days in the European Theater of Operations, starting in the Alsace, crossing into southern Germany, and swarming into Austria, with individual elements reaching into northern Italy. The corps was commanded in combat by Major General Frank W. Milburn as a subordinate unit of the Seventh U.S. Army.

On 3 February 1944 the Headquarters and Headquarters Battery, 214th Field Artillery Group was constituted in the Army of the United States and was assigned to XXI Corps, Fourth United States Army. It was activated on 17 April 1944 at Camp Van Dorn, Mississippi.

== Eastern France ==
The corps entered combat on 17 January 1945, during pitched battle by the U.S. Seventh Army to regain ground lost to Germany's Operation Nordwind New Year's offensive into Alsace. From 25 January until 16 February 1945, XXI Corps was attached to the French First Army and took part in bitter winter combat that ultimately collapsed the Colmar Pocket. After a period of rest, the corps returned to the front on 28 February 1945 and pushed to the edge of the Siegfried Line during the first week of March, 1945.

== Germany and Austria ==
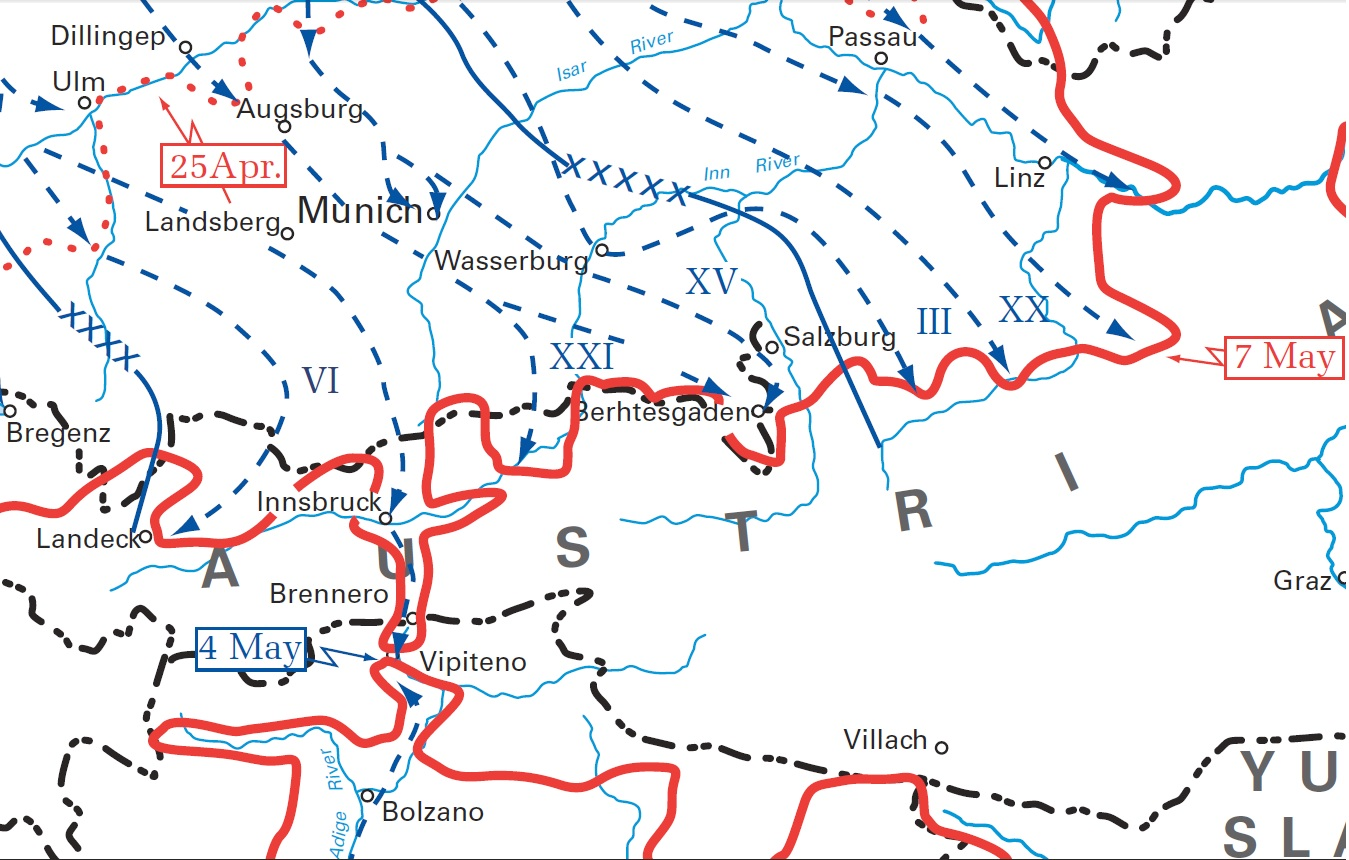
Elements of the XXI Corps reached Berchtesgaden, Germany, Wörgl, Austria, and Vipiteno, Italy by war's end

On 20 March 1945, after five days of combat, the corps broke through the Siegfried Line and captured Saarbrücken. Crossing the Rhine behind the U.S. XV Corps in Operation Undertone, the XXI Corps captured Würzburg on 5 April 1945, after a three-day battle marked by an assault across the Main River. Facing determined opposition, the corps fought its way into Schweinfurt on 12 April 1945, after five days of battle. Assaulting Fuerth on 18 April 1945, the corps seized Ansbach the following day and began a drive on the Danube River, over which the corps seized an intact bridge at Dillingen on 22 April 1945. On 28 April 1945, Augsburg fell to the XXI Corps, and on 1 May 1945, the corps seized Bad Tölz and captured German Field Marshal Gerd von Rundstedt. On 3 May 1945, units of the corps that included the 12th Armored Division entered Austria via Kufstein, and advanced along the Inn River as far as Wörgl until met the next day by troops of the 409th Infantry Regiment of the Fifth Army's 103rd Infantry Division of VI Corps radiating northeast from Innsbruck. German forces in the area unconditionally surrendered on 6 May 1945.

Other XXI Corps elements, which included the attached 101st Airborne Division, reached Berchtesgaden from the northwest by 8 May.

XXI Corps Headquarters was inactivated in Germany on 30 September 1945.

== Cold War ==
Subsequent to the Second World War, the corps was active from September 1957 until June 1970. The post-Second World War activation and inactivation occurred at Indiantown Gap Military Reservation, Pennsylvania.

The 1176th U.S. Army Terminal traced its history to the 7463rd USAR Transportation Terminal which was established in May 1963. On 16 December 1965 the unit was reorganized and the 1176th was established as a U.S. Army Outport by MTMC at Curtis Bay, Maryland. A new Reserve Center building was completed and dedicated in September 1981.

On 22 December 1967, the 97th Army Reserve Command was activated at Fort Meade, Maryland. The new ARCOM took control of 12 major subordinate commands from the deactivating XXI Corps at Indiantown Gap Military Reservation. They included the 10th JAG Detachment; the 11th Special Forces Group; the 170th Direct Support and 220th Military Police Groups; the 1176th U.S. Army Terminal; the 2122nd U.S. Army Garrison; the 2070th, 2071st, 2076th, 2079th, and 2086th U.S. Army Reserve Schools; and the 2290th U.S. Army Reserve Hospital. The 97th ARCOM assumed command of these units on June 1, 1968, and XXI Corps inactivated on July 1, 1968.

== Campaign credit ==
- Ardennes-Alsace Battle Credit
- Rhineland
- Central Europe

== See also ==
- Sixth United States Army Group
- Seventh United States Army
- 12th Armored Division (United States)
- 101st Cavalry Regiment
- 289th Engineer Combat Battalion (United States)
- 549th Engineer Light Ponton Company
