= Mk 6 Assault Boat =

The Mk 6 Assault Boat is an assault boat used by the Royal Engineers of the British Army. It is usually paddled for a silent or night-time approach, but can be fitted with an outboard motor. Its built from glass reinforced plastic and is light enough to be carried by four men.

The Mk 6 Assault Boat is used as a versatile, general purpose craft that was designed to carry up to 10 fully equipped troops or 1,043 kg of stores. It also makes a useful ferry craft when fitted with an outboard motor. Assault Boats may be stacked six deep for storage or transport.

Whilst basic and often overlooked it has been in constant operational use since its introduction, including conducting patrols on Helmand Reservoir in Afghanistan and proved highly useful in the Southern Iraq Marshes, especially over the last year of British Operations on the Qarmat Ali Waterway, north of Basra where the ability to carry the boat over shallows made it much more employable than the faster but larger Rigid Raider or Combat Support Boat.

== See also ==
- Assault boat
