= Assault boat =

Military transport vessel

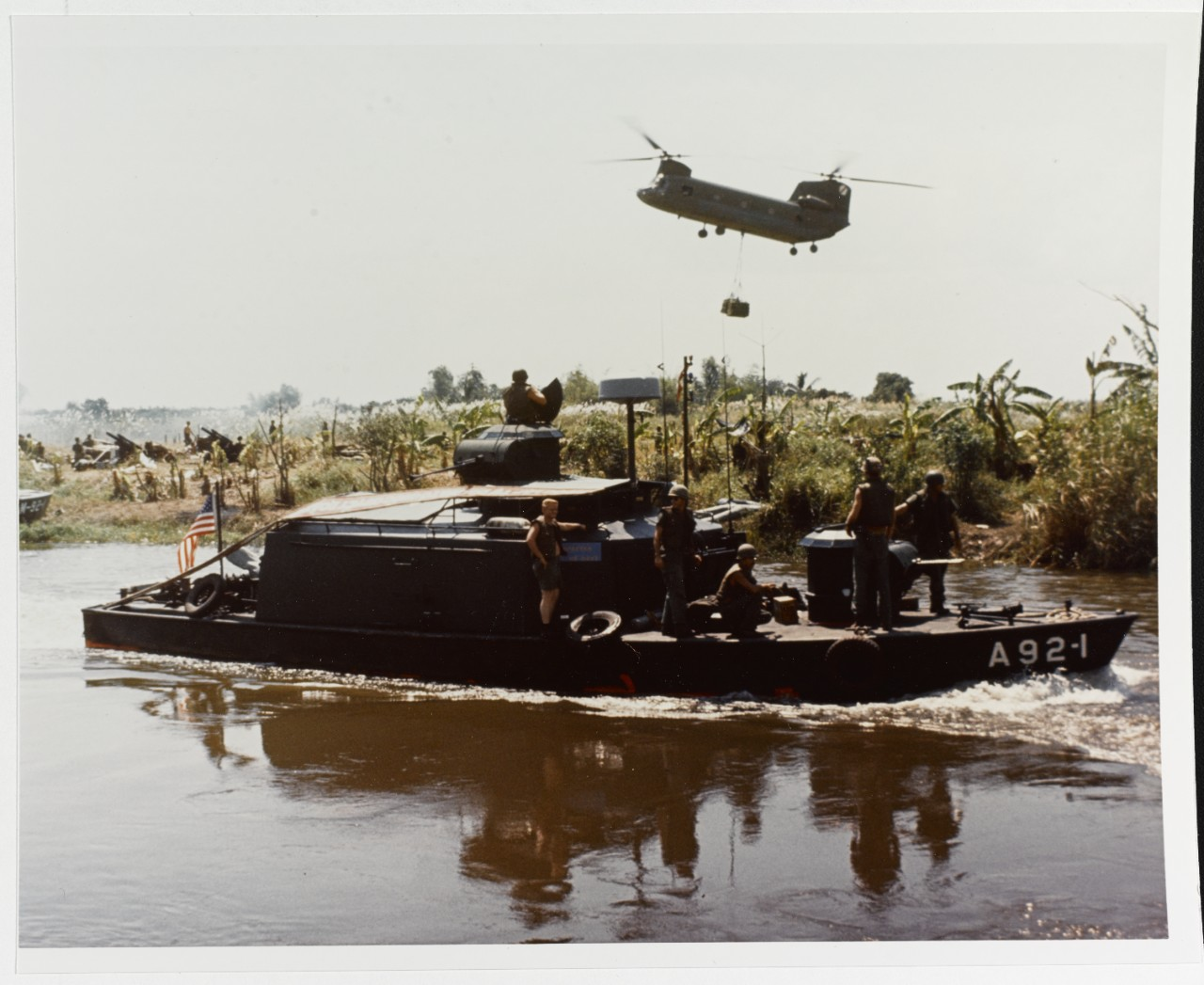
ASPB on patrol during Operation Coronado IX, November 1967

An assault boat is a boat used for landing in combat, specifically for inland waters. Their lightweight construction allows for them to be carried by multiple men on foot. They can either be paddled or fitted with an outboard motor for high-speed operation. Some assault boats can be fitted with small firearms such as automatic rifles. Larger assault boats are used in riverine and littoral water where the boat can easily berth in tight spaces and shallow waters. The length of assault boats is usually 5 to 20 meters and they are constructed from rubber, fiberglass, aluminum, or steel.

== WWII ==
=== U.S. military ===
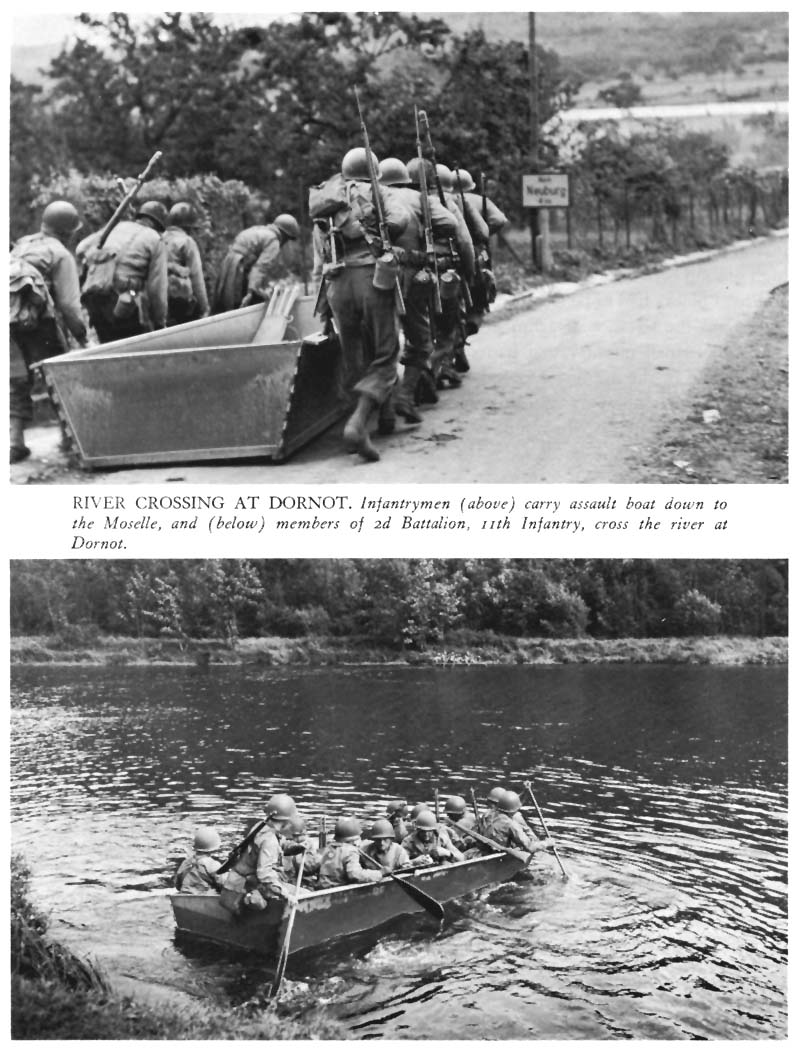
American soldiers deploy an M2 assault boat during the battle of Dornot-Corny next to the Moselle River

Assault boats in the U.S. military during World War II were typically used by Combat Engineer Battalions, whose combat engineers deployed and crewed them.

The Americans deployed two types of assault boats, the "Storm Boat" and the "M2." The "Storm Boat" was an 8-man (6+2 crew) high-speed assault boat with a 55-horsepower outboard motor designed to breach at speed thus allowing the soldiers on board to "storm the shore". The "M2" was a ten-man boat (8+2 crew) that was paddled.

=== British ===
The British used two types of assault boat: a "storm boat" and a lower performance canvas boat known as "The Goatley boat".

=== Overview of the differences between British and American Storm and Assault Boats ===
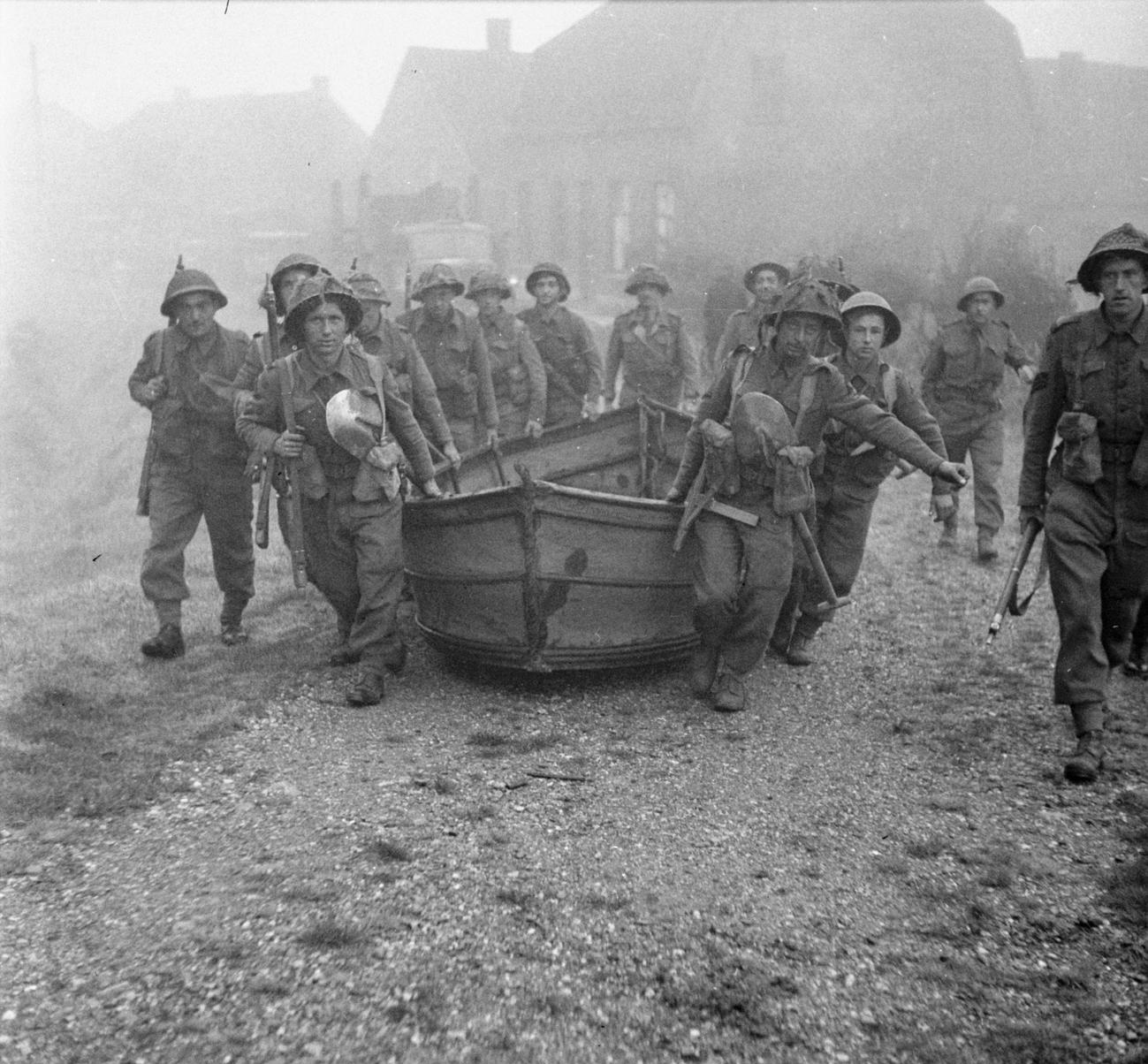
British soldiers crossing the Meuse-Escaut canal

==== Assault Boats ====
| | British Canvas Boats | U.S Plywood Boat, M-2 |
|---|---|---|
| Portability | Could be carried by four men | Not easily portable |
| Water maneuverability | Easily when loaded | Easily when loaded or empty |
| Fragility in transit | Easily damaged by rough handling | Not likely to be damaged |
| Repairability | Not easily repaired | Easily repaired |
| Purpose | Carrying up to ten men | Infantry support rafts and assault boat bridge |
| Assembly | Two minute assembly for two men | |

==== Storm Boats ====
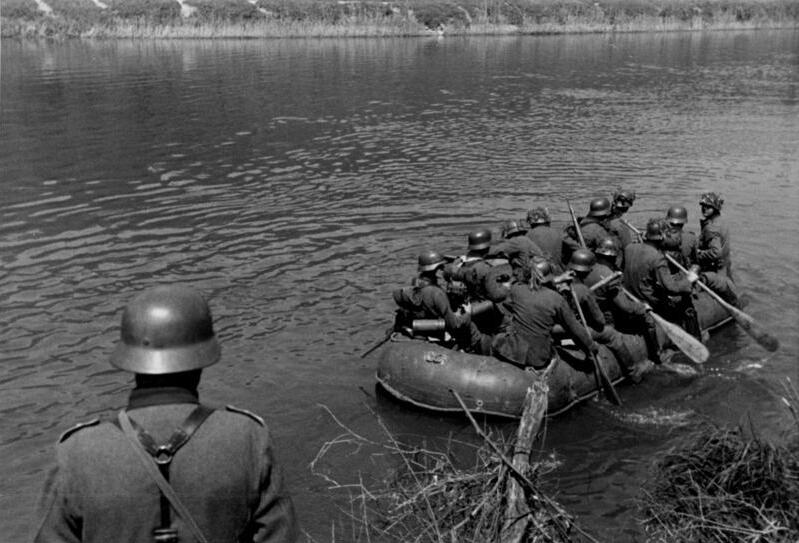
German soldiers in a rubber assault boat crossing the Meuse

a. British Storm Boat.

(1) Heavier to carry across the country.
(2) Would carry the heavier load (6-pounders or jeep though the latter a top-heavy load).
(3) Carried ten men but at a lower speed.

b. American Storm Boat.

(1) Carried by 6 men (plus 2 for motor).
(2) Would carry up to 1500 lbs with very little reduction in speed.
(3) Carried 7 men (above crew) at maximum speed.
(4) Was the faster boat; would beach at full speed.

c. Conclusions:

(1) For assault crossing of personnel the U.S. boat carried fewer men but got them across the river and in action much faster.
(2) For cargo carrying, the British boat carried a greater load but at a slower speed.

== See also ==
- Landing Craft Rubber Small
- Landing Craft Rubber Large
- Rigid Raider
- Mk 6 Assault Boat
- Combat Rubber Raiding Craft
- Goatley boat
