= USS Sea Owl =

Balao class submarine

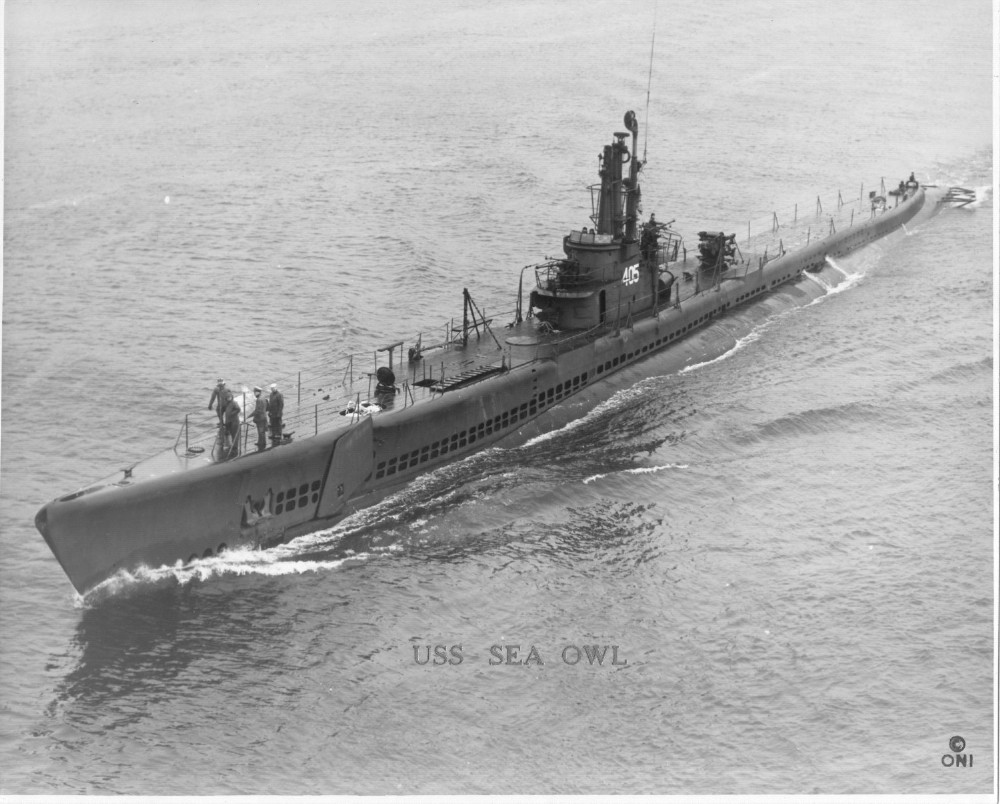
- Sea Owl (SS-405), World War II appearance.

History

United States
- Builder: Portsmouth Naval Shipyard, Kittery, Maine
- Laid down: 7 February 1944
- Launched: 7 May 1944
- Commissioned: 17 July 1944
- Decommissioned: 15 November 1969
- Stricken: 15 November 1969
- Fate: Sold for scrap, 3 June 1971

General characteristics
- Class & type: Balao class diesel-electric submarine
- Displacement: 1,526 tons (1,550 t) surfaced; 2,401 tons (2,440 t) submerged
- Length: 311 ft 8 in (95.00 m)
- Beam: 27 ft 3 in (8.31 m)
- Draft: 16 ft 10 in (5.13 m) maximum
- Propulsion: 4 × Fairbanks-Morse Model 38D8-⅛ 10-cylinder opposed piston diesel engines driving electrical generators; 2 × 126-cell Sargo batteries; 2 × low-speed direct-drive Elliott electric motors; two propellers; 5,400 shp (4.0 MW) surfaced; 2,740 shp (2.0 MW) submerged
- Speed: 20.25 knots (38 km/h) surfaced; 8.75 knots (16 km/h) submerged
- Range: 11,000 nautical miles (20,000 km) surfaced at 10 knots (19 km/h)
- Endurance: 48 hours at 2 knots (3.7 km/h) submerged; 75 days on patrol
- Test depth: 400 ft (120 m)
- Complement: 10 officers, 70–71 enlisted
- Armament: 10 × 21-inch (533 mm) torpedo tubes; 6 forward, 4 aft; 24 torpedoes; 1 × 5-inch (127 mm) / 25 caliber deck gun; Bofors 40 mm and Oerlikon 20 mm cannon

USS Sea Owl (SS/AGSS-405), a Balao-class submarine, was a ship of the United States Navy named for the sea owl, a lumpfish of the North Atlantic Ocean.

During World War II, the United States operated two ships named Sea Owl in commission at the same time, the Navy's SS-405 and the War Shipping Administration′s SS Sea Owl, a Bayfield-class attack transport.

== Construction and commissioning ==
Sea Owl was laid down by the Portsmouth Navy Yard at Kittery, Maine, on 7 February 1944; launched on 7 May 1944, sponsored by Mrs. Thomas L. Gatch; and commissioned on 17 July 1944.

== World War II ==
After shakedown off Portsmouth, New Hampshire, and New London, Connecticut, Sea Owl transited the Panama Canal and arrived at Pearl Harbor on 23 October 1944. Her first war patrol commenced on 19 November and was conducted in the East China Sea as part of a coordinated attack group with Sea Poacher (SS-406) and Piranha (SS-389). She carried trial versions of Mark 18 electric and Mark 27 ("Cutie") homing torpedoes. After three weeks of searching for worthwhile targets, Sea Owl sank her initial victim, a Japanese destroyer escort, with one Mark 27. She followed with a second escort, stopped by a Mark 27 and finished off with one Mark 18, from about 1000 yd (910 m). This was the first combat success for both weapons. The remainder of the patrol was uneventful, and the submarine put into Guam on 15 January 1945.

For her second war patrol, Sea Owl joined Piranha and Puffer (SS-268) in patrolling in Luzon Strait and the South China Sea. She was off Wake Island early on the morning of 18 April when she attacked a Japanese submarine. She is often credited with sinking Ro-46 or Ro-56 in this attack, but Ro-46 and Ro-56 were sunk in the vicinity of Okinawa during the first half of April 1945 and neither ever visited the Wake Island area. The submarine Sea Owl attacked on 18 April was I-372 — and I-372 survived the attack. Sea Owl′s second patrol ended at Midway Atoll on 21 April 1945.

Sea Owl got underway for her third and final war patrol on 20 May in concert with Puffer and Tirante (SS-420). This patrol was concentrated in the Yellow and East China Seas and was devoted to both lifeguard duties and offensive patrol.

After 19 days, two Japanese destroyers were contacted and six torpedoes were fired from a perfect set-up. The first torpedo hit one of the destroyers in her magazine amidships, blowing her up in the water and allowing the other torpedoes to pass under the target and miss. The other destroyer joined forces with two patrol craft and dropped 84 depth charges during the following 14 hours but inflicted no material damage.The IJN vessel destroyed was the corvette Kaibokan 41 (745 tons) in Tsushima Strait, southeast of Mokpo, Korea in position 34°22'N, 128°11'E.

Four days later, Sea Owl, in a gun attack, destroyed a large, rice-laden, four-masted schooner from which she captured two prisoners of war. On 2 July, she rescued six downed aviators after a 135-nautical-mile (250 km; 155 mi) race against darkness. All six were treated for wounds and were included in the crew for the remainder of the patrol.

When the Japanese surrendered on 15 August, Sea Owl was in Pearl Harbor preparing for her fourth war patrol.

== 1945 – 1951 ==
Upon returning to the United States in September, Sea Owl was assigned to the Atlantic Fleet and was based at Balboa in the Canal Zone as a unit of Submarine Squadron 6 (SubRon 6). From October 1946 through March 1947, she made a cruise along the west coast of South America and joined the other submarines of SubRon 6 in fleet exercises off Culebra Island in the West Indies. She next supported antisubmarine training at Guantanamo Bay, Cuba, and Key West, Fla.

Sea Owl underwent overhaul at the Philadelphia Navy Yard from September 1947 to January 1948 followed by a brief period of refresher training in the Caribbean. She resumed her duties at Balboa on 12 January and, for the next 18 months, operated in the Panama area and Caribbean Sea participating in fleet training exercises.

On 27 June 1949, Sea Owl arrived at the Portsmouth Naval Shipyard for a regularly scheduled overhaul and, upon completion in October, was assigned to SubRon 8 in New London, Conn. For the next two years she operated in the Atlantic, participating in fleet exercises and antisubmarine training.

== 1951 – 1961 ==
Sea Owl was converted to a Fleet Snorkel submarine in the Philadelphia Navy Yard from April to August 1951 and, for the next year, she participated in Atlantic Fleet exercises in the Caribbean area. Early in 1953, the submarine entered Charleston Naval Shipyard in South Carolina for overhaul and, upon completion, sailed to New London and then to the Caribbean as part of operation "Springboard." After returning to New London in March, she departed for her first tour of duty with the 6th Fleet in the Mediterranean, participating in fleet exercises and in Operation "Keystone" and visiting France, Italy, Spain, Greece, and Turkey in a three-month tour.

Returning to New London in August 1954, Sea Owl spent the next two years in Atlantic and Caribbean waters training submarine school students and reserve personnel. After engaging in special operations in the late fall of 1956 and early 1957, the submarine resumed normal duties in the New London area until 1 September when she departed to engage in NATO exercises "Fishplay" and "Strikeback" in the northern Atlantic, returning to New London in October.

In April and May 1958, Sea Owl participated in NATO Exercise "New Broom" and, upon returning to New London, engaged in local operations for the remainder of the year. After a five-month overhaul early in 1959, she participated in NATO Exercise "Fishplay" and spent the latter months of 1960 in her second deployment to the Mediterranean.

Sea Owl commenced 1961 with an extended upkeep period followed by local operations in the New London area. On 6 March, she departed for another Mediterranean tour followed by a scheduled overhaul in the Portsmouth Naval Shipyard.

== 1962 – 1969 ==
After the 1962 Christmas holidays, Sea Owl departed for the Caribbean to take part in the second phase of operation "Springboard" including antisubmarine warfare exercises and visits to Puerto Rico and the Virgin Islands. Immediately following, she was engaged in a two-week antisubmarine warfare exercise with surface and air units of the Royal Canadian Navy in the vicinity of Bermuda. In April 1963, she participated in Exercise "New Broom XI" with joint forces of the United States and Canada. The remainder of the year consisted of submarine school operations and training exercises in the New London area.

In July 2021, declassified documentation in relation to a FIOA lawsuit surrounding USS Thresher's loss, indicate Sea Owl was ordered to and participated in the search for the stricken nuclear submarine. This documentation states that Sea Owl join with nuclear submarine Seawolf, in search procedures on 11 April 1963, and that Seawolf managed to make contact on four separate dives that day, while Sea Owl stood guard to keep interlopers away from the casualty site. This new information surrounding this event is still coming to light, including how much Sea Owl was involved.

On 8 February 1964, Sea Owl commenced a five-week availability at the Philadelphia Naval Shipyard followed by participation in Exercise "Long Hook" with joint forces of the United States, British, Canadian, and Dutch Navies and in Exercise "Canus Silex" with Canadian and United States Naval forces. In September, the submarine participated in Exercise "Master Stroke" and Exercise "Canus Slamex" with United States, Canadian, and British forces and returned to the Philadelphia Naval Shipyard on 2 November for a five-month overhaul.

On 7 July 1965, Seal Owl put to sea for a four-month deployment to the Mediterranean and, after returning to New London, engaged in local exercises for the remainder of the year.

Sea Owl spent 1966 providing services for the Submarine School and Operational Test and Evaluation Force in New London with time out for participation in Operation "Springboard" in the Caribbean. During 1967, she participated in various fleet and training exercises; and, on 22 May, deployed to northern European waters for a training and good will tour, returning in July.

During a discharge physical examination, one of the crewman was discovered to have an active case of tuberculosis in an advanced stage. Due to the close environment and isolated atmosphere of the submarine, the crew was transferred to the United States Naval Hospital, St. Albans, N.Y., for three days of intensive tests. Following laboratory analysis, it was found that no other active cases existed, and the crew was returned to the submarine. Because of the unique living conditions of submarine life, Sea Owl served as a control group for clinical research for the Tuberculosis Service, Bureau of Medicine and Surgery.

Operations for the year 1968 included various fleet exercises, including antisubmarine warfare operations with destroyer units and various NATO and United States ASW naval air squadrons. Training exercises included both officer submarine school and weekend reserve training cruises. Sea Owl participated in the U.S. Navy's search for the overdue and missing USS Scorpion.

On 30 June 1969, Sea Owl was reclassified as an auxiliary submarine, AGSS-405. She departed New London on 7 July for her final deployment to the Mediterranean. Upon return, the submarine was ordered to commence preparations for deactivation. On 15 November, after more than 25 years of dedicated service, Sea Owl was decommissioned and struck from the Navy list. Sea Owl was sold for scrapping, 3 June 1971.

== Honors and awards ==
Sea Owl received five battle stars for World War II.
