= Sea owl =

A sea owl is a lumpfish of the North Atlantic.

It may also refer to:

- SS Sea Owl, a type C3-S-A2 ship launched 17 December 1943 completed as a troop transport operated by the War Shipping Administration during World War II
- USS Sea Owl (SS-405) Balao-class submarine launched 5 May 1944, in U.S. Navy service 1944–1969
