= Paul Newgarden =

United States Army general

Paul W. Newgarden
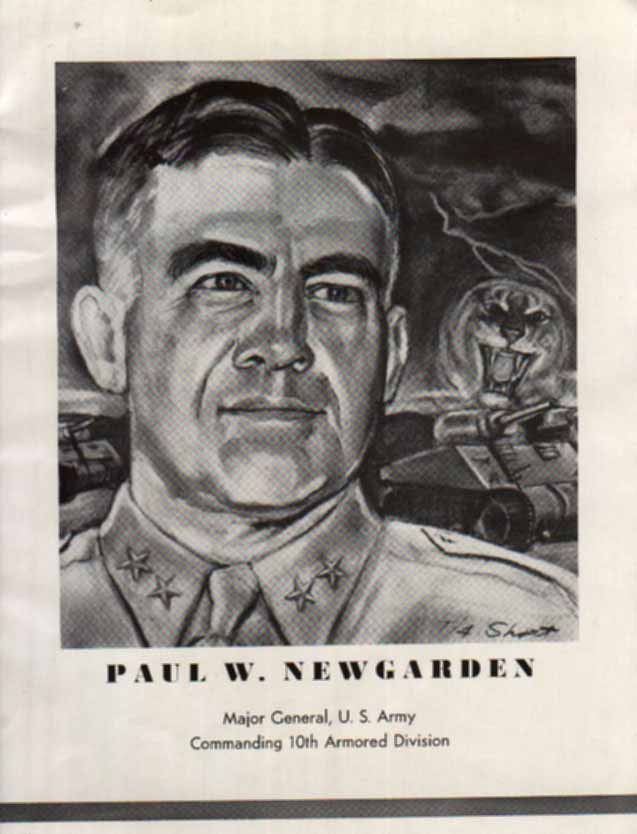
- Born: February 24, 1892; Philadelphia, Pennsylvania, United States
- Died: July 14, 1944 (aged 52); Chattanooga, Tennessee, United States
- Military career
- Allegiance: United States
- Branch: United States Army
- Service years: 1913–1944
- Rank: Major General
- Unit: Infantry Branch
- Commands: 41st Armored Infantry Regiment; 10th Armored Division
- Conflicts: World War I World War II
- Awards: Legion of Merit

Major General Paul Woolever Newgarden (February 24, 1892 – July 14, 1944) was a senior United States Army officer.

== Early years ==
Newgarden was born on February 24, 1892, in Philadelphia, Pennsylvania, the son of a United States Army medical officer, Lt. Col. George J. Newgarden, and Margaret Woolever Newgarden.

As a boy he lived on a number of Army posts until his father's retirement due to physical disability in the line of duty in 1907. Seeking an Army career, he obtained an appointment at large to the United States Military Academy and entered on March 1, 1909, from Washington, D. C. at the age of 17.

== Education ==
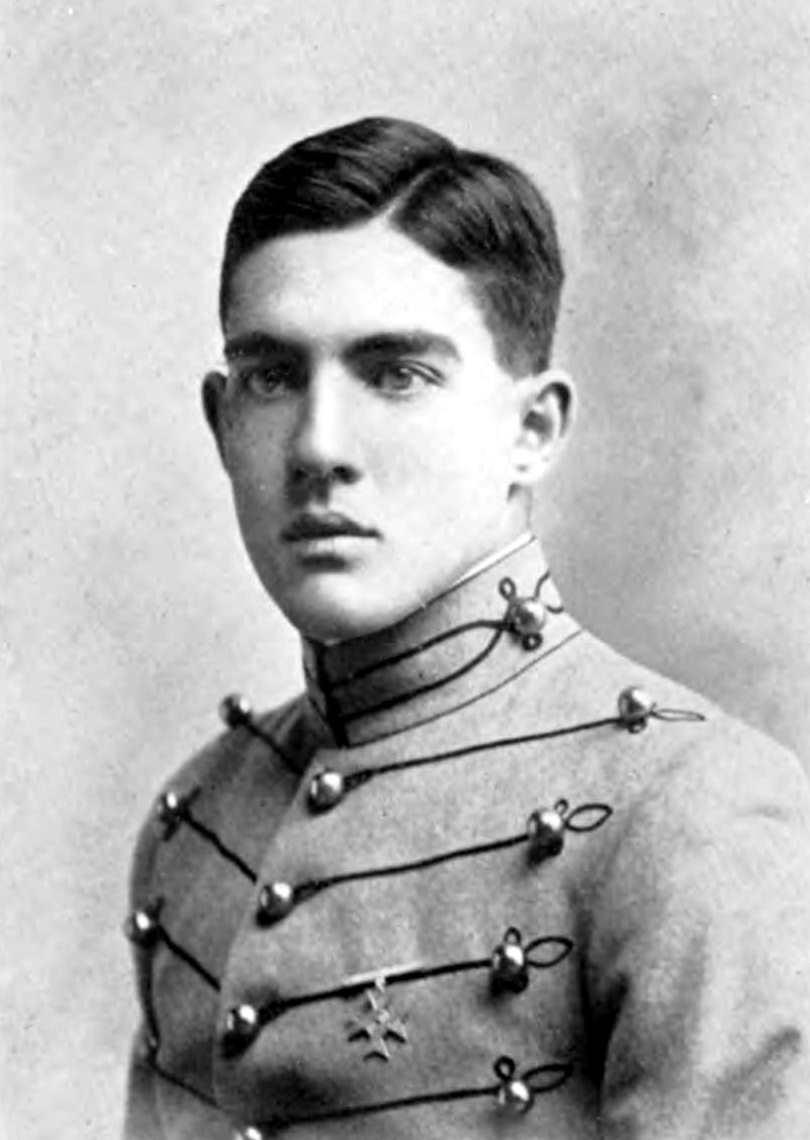
At West Point in 1913

As a cadet he was popular, and early on showed the basic elements of leadership which would mark him for early selection to command. Throughout his four years as a cadet he worked industriously in the gym and made several athletic squads, including baseball, broadsword, indoor meet, and hockey. He took an intense interest in marksmanship, earning the nickname "Pistol Paul". He became a Distinguished Pistol Shot and a member of the Infantry Pistol Team which, in 1923, won a national championship from the Marines.

== Life and career ==
An ardent believer in the Infantry as the backbone of the Army, he joined the 21st Infantry Regiment at Vancouver Barracks in 1913, and was also assigned to several training camps on the west coast as an instructor just prior to World War I. In 1919 he was National Junior Saber Champion. Next he was assigned as a tactical officer at West Point, which prevented him from going overseas in World War I. He saw those battlefields when after the war he accompanied a group of early graduates on a trip through France, Germany and Italy.

While at the Infantry School in 1921-1922 he continued his interest and training in marksmanship. He served in 1924 with the 27th Infantry Regiment in Hawaii as a Major, and completed his tour in the Islands with a year as Inspector of the Hawaiian Division. Upon his return to the United States he completed The Command and General Staff School, and was then assigned to command the Infantry Demonstration Battalion at The Field Artillery School, Fort Sill, Oklahoma, from 1927 to 1931. His experience in tactics was rapidly broadening, and his interest in sports continued. He took part in polo, tennis, swimming, and hunting, and also taught tennis at Fort Sill, as he had done in Hawaii. While at Fort Sill he met and married Priscilla Quinby of Wellesley Hills, Massachusetts, in December 1927.

Following courses at the Army War College in 1931–1932, he had duty in the Training Section, Office of the Chief of Infantry. By now his ability for higher echelon jobs was well established and he became G-l of the First Army in its initial organization from 1934 to 1936, and later G-3 of the Sixth Corps Area in Chicago. However, his main love was straight duty with troops. In 1940 he organized and trained the 41st Armored Infantry Regiment, the infantry regiment of the Second Armored Division. During this period General George S. Patton said of him on his efficiency report: "Colonel Newgarden is the best regimental commander I know. He is a natural leader. He will go far". His rise in command was fast.

On January 15, 1942, he was promoted to Brigadier General and commanded Combat Command A of the 2nd Armored Division. [Combat Command A became the 1st TIGER Brigade, 2nd Armored Division in the 1950s.] Shortly thereafter, on June 22, 1942, he was promoted to temporary Major General, and assigned to organize and train the 10th Armored Division at Fort Benning.

Said Newgarden,

We of the 10th Armored Division have chosen to call ourselves "Tigers" because of the tiger's many soldierly characteristics. Tenth Armored 'Tigers' should be able to describe to their friends, as well as be able to impress their enemies, with these tiger qualities. The "Tiger" is primarily a field soldier. He is at home in the field, jungles, or woods. His motto is to "Terrify and Destroy". He is able to carry out his motto because of his marvelous muscular development, smooth coordination, his ability to maneuver and surprise his prey, and when he hits, he hits hard, and shoots straight at the mark with devastating accuracy. No one ever saw a fat "Tiger"—he keeps himself in perfect condition—not to mention his coat, which is always clean and neat. The "Tiger" has one weak spot—he hates water, but he can be taught to swim. The "Tiger's" favorite attack is made in the dark—he has such a good sense of direction, and he has worked so much in the dark, that he never gets lost. The "Tiger" never quits. He is the most ferocious fighter in the animal kingdom. We have 12,000 "Tigers" that will never be licked.

Official visitors were impressed with the superior results he obtained. Among those visitors were the President, the Army Chief of Staff, and various general officers high in the training organization of the Army as well as distinguished British leaders, including Anthony Eden.

While Major General William H. H. Morris took the "Tigers" into battle, Newgarden was the first to command and train them, and the 10th Armored Division played key roles in several engagements during World War II.

== Death ==
In July 1944, while traveling in a military aircraft from an Armored Force conference at Fort Knox, Kentucky, to his Division Headquarters at Fort Benning, Georgia, Newgarden learned that one of his junior officers traveling with him could spend a few hours with his family by rerouting the plane through Chattanooga, Tennessee. He approved the change. The new route was unexpectedly blanketed with a violent storm, resulting in a fatal plane crash on July 14.

Newgarden was posthumously awarded the Legion of Merit on October 12, 1944, the presentation being made to his widow. The citation read, "For exceptionally meritorious conduct in the performance of outstanding service as Commanding General, 10th Armored Division, from its activation 15 July 1942 to his death 15 July 1944".

Newgarden was survived by his widow, Priscilla Quinby Newgarden, who lived in Brunswick, Maine; his stepmother Mrs. George J. Newgarden of Washington, D. C. and his brother, Colonel George J. Newgarden, Jr. (U.S. Army, Retired).

The likeness of General Newgarden, as seen above, was drawn in charcoal by T/4 Louis J. Short of the Tiger Division.

== Commands ==
- May 7, 1935 – August 4, 1935 – Temporary Assistant Chief of Staff (G-1), 1st Army
- October 21, 1935 – January 13, 1936 - Executive Officer, Fort Wadsworth, New York
- January 14, 1936 – March 1, 1936 - Attached to Headquarters 1st Army
- May 13, 1936 – August 23, 1936 - Executive Officer, 18th Infantry Regiment
- August 24, 1936 – August 22, 1940 - Assistant Chief of Staff ( G-3 ), 6th Corps Area
- March 5, 1938 – March 25, 1938 - Acting Chief of Staff, 6th Corps Area
- September 3, 1940 – June 1941 - Instructor at Command & General Staff School
- June 1941 – January 9, 1942 - Commanding Officer 41st Armored Infantry Regiment
- January 10, 1942 – June 1942 - Commanding Officer Combat Command A, 2nd Armored Division
- July 15, 1942 – July 14, 1944 - Commanding General 10th Armored Division
- July 14, 1944 – Killed in airplane crash

== Important promotions ==
- August 1, 1935 – Lieutenant Colonel
- June 26, 1941 – Colonel (Army of the United States)
- January 15, 1942 – Brigadier General (Army of the United States)
- June 22, 1942 – Major General (Army of the United States)
- July 1, 1942 – Colonel (permanent)

Military offices
Preceded by Newly activated post	Commanding General 10th Armored Division; 1942–1944	Succeeded by William Morris
