= 10th Armored Division (United States) =

- 10th Armored Division shoulder sleeve insignia
- Active: 15 July 1942 – 13 October 1945
- Country: United States
- Branch: United States Army
- Type: Armor
- Role: Armored warfare
- Size: Division
- Part of: Seventh United States Army
- Nickname: Tiger Division
- Mottos: "Terrify and Destroy"
- Mascot: Tiger
- Engagements: World War II; Rhineland; Ardennes-Alsace; Central Europe
- Decorations: Presidential Unit Citations (5)

Commanders
- Notable commanders: Major General Paul Newgarden; Major General William H. H. Morris; Major General Fay B. Prickett

Insignia
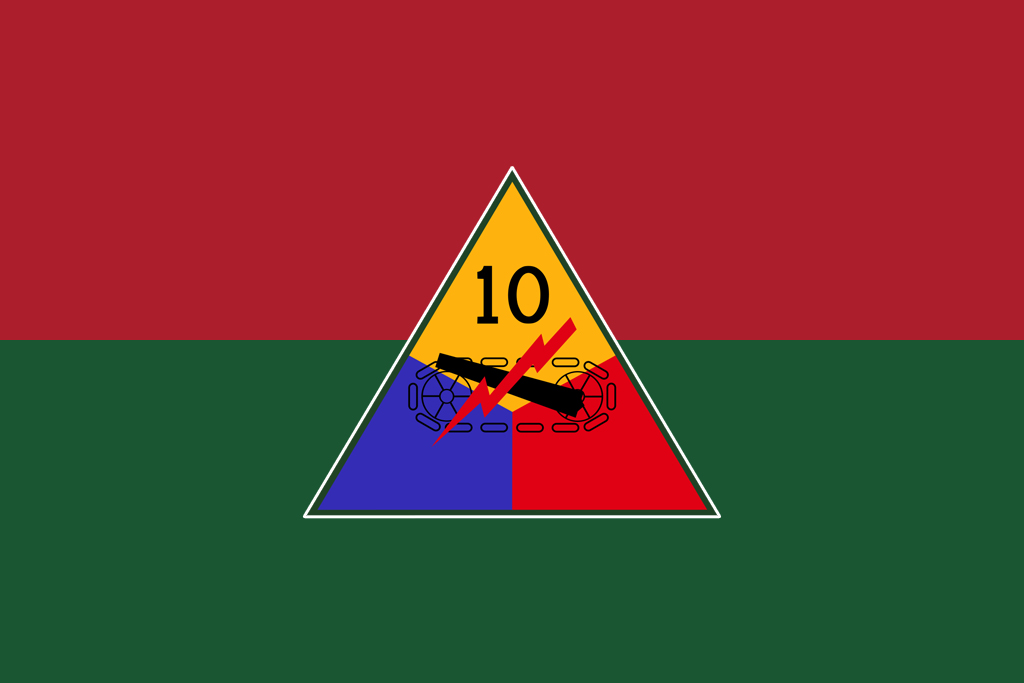
- Flag of the United States Army 10th Armored Division

The 10th Armored Division (nicknamed "Tiger Division") was an armored division of the United States Army in World War II. In the European Theater of Operations the 10th Armored Division was part of both the Twelfth United States Army Group and Sixth United States Army Group. Originally assigned to the Third United States Army under General George S. Patton, it saw action with the Seventh United States Army under General Alexander Patch near the conclusion of the war.

The 10th Armored Division was inactivated on 13 October 1945 at Camp Patrick Henry, Virginia. On 25 February 1953, the division was allotted to the Regular Army but remained inactive.

== History ==
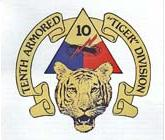
Alternate emblem

The division was activated in the Army of the United States on 15 July 1942, at Fort Benning, Georgia, around a nucleus of the reorganized and redesignated 3rd and 11th Cavalry Regiments. The division completed its training at Ft. Gordon, Georgia, but during its training period Major General Paul Newgarden was killed in a plane crash on 14 July 1944 while returning from Fort Knox to Georgia. Major General William H.H. Morris, Jr. would take command at this time. Only two months later, the division would sail for France. The "Armoraiders" would land at Cherbourg on 23 September 1944.

=== Nickname ===
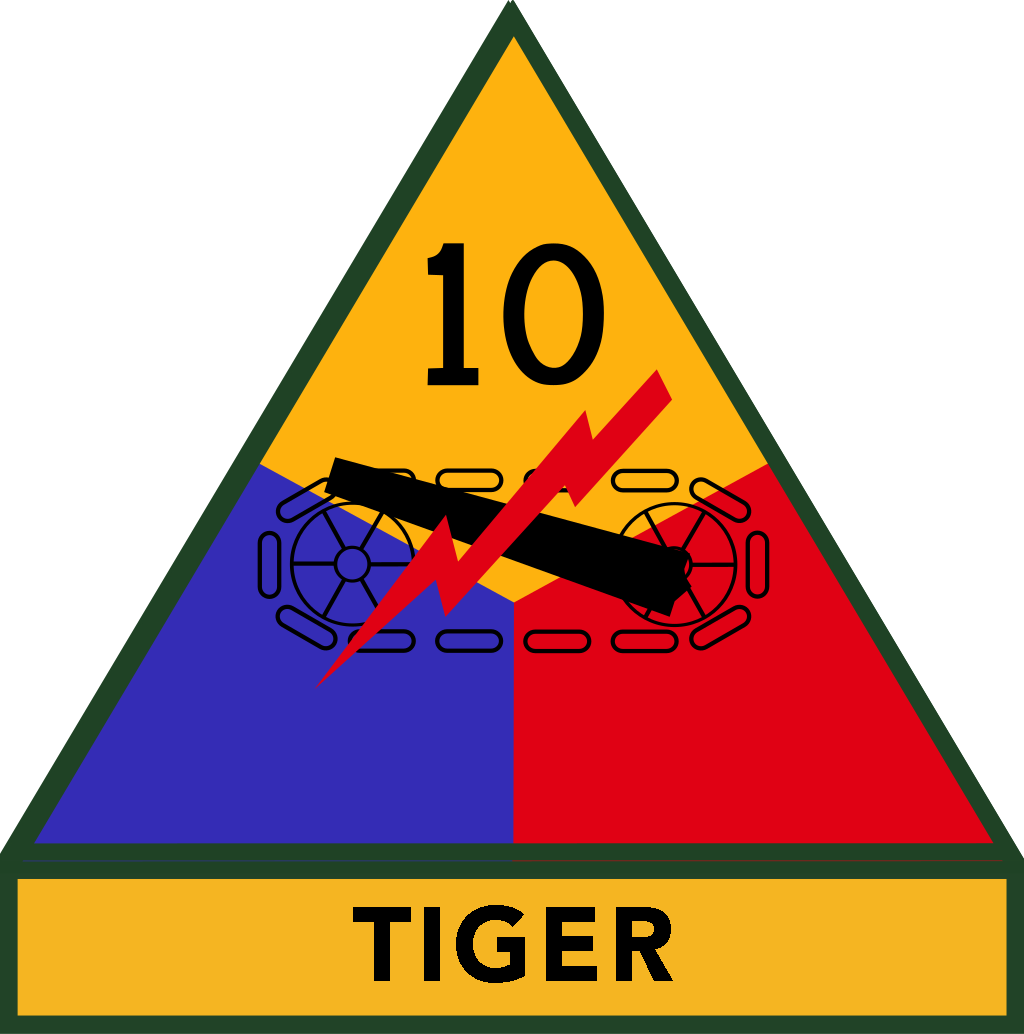
10th Armored Division "Tiger" Insignia

The "Tiger" nickname of the 10th originates from a division-wide contest held while it was training in the United States, symbolizing the division "clawing and mauling" its way through the enemy. Major General Paul Newgarden, the division's first commander selected "Tiger" as the winner because a tiger has soldierly qualities, including being clean and neat and the ability to maneuver and surprise his prey.

=== Combat chronicle ===
The 10th Armored Division entered France through the port of Cherbourg-en-Cotentin, 23 September 1944, and put in a month of training at Teurtheville, France, before entering combat, as part of the Third Army under General George S. Patton. Leaving Teurtheville, 25 October, the Division moved to Mars-la-Tour, where it entered combat, 2 November, in support of the XX Corps, containing enemy troops in the area. Later that month, the 10th participated in the capture of Metz. After fierce fighting, the 10th moved to the Siegfried Line and led the Third Army into Germany on 19 November 1944.

==== Bastogne ====
Combat Command-B's lead Sherman tanks, tank destroyers and half-tracks entered Bastogne 18 December 1944. These were the first combat troops to reach the threatened town. CCB's commander, Col. William L. Roberts, split his command to form a crescent-shaped arc facing eastward five miles from the city. A task force commanded by Maj. William R. Desobry went north to Noville, while a similar group under Lt. Col. Henry T. Cherry wheeled east to Longvilly. Lt. Col. James O'Hara's group shifted southeast to Bras.

At the same time, German forces moved westward with increasing momentum. Bastogne, a hub from which seven main roads diverged, was essential to the swift movement of Rundstedt's panzers. Before dawn of 19 December five German divisions attacked CCB. Bazooka-armed American soldiers and a single platoon of tank destroyers fought a column of German Panzer IV tanks on the Houffalize-Noville highway, turning them back. More enemy armor followed and with the road blocked, the battle spilled into the snow-covered fields and woods. For eight hours, CCB alone withstood multiple German attacks before reinforcements arrived from the 101st Airborne Division, which had moved into Bastogne under the screen of the 10th's actions.

The Germans still maintained an advantage and the outnumbered Americans withdrew closer to Bastogne. The Germans sent pincers to the north and south. The night of 21 December, the pincers met and closed west of the city. In the surrounded city, the 10th assembled a mobile reserve force to strike in any direction.

CCB endured the cold, artillery barrages and bombing while their supplies and ammunition dwindled. Fourth Armored Division tanks finally broke through on 26 December, but CCB continued to fight until 18 January.

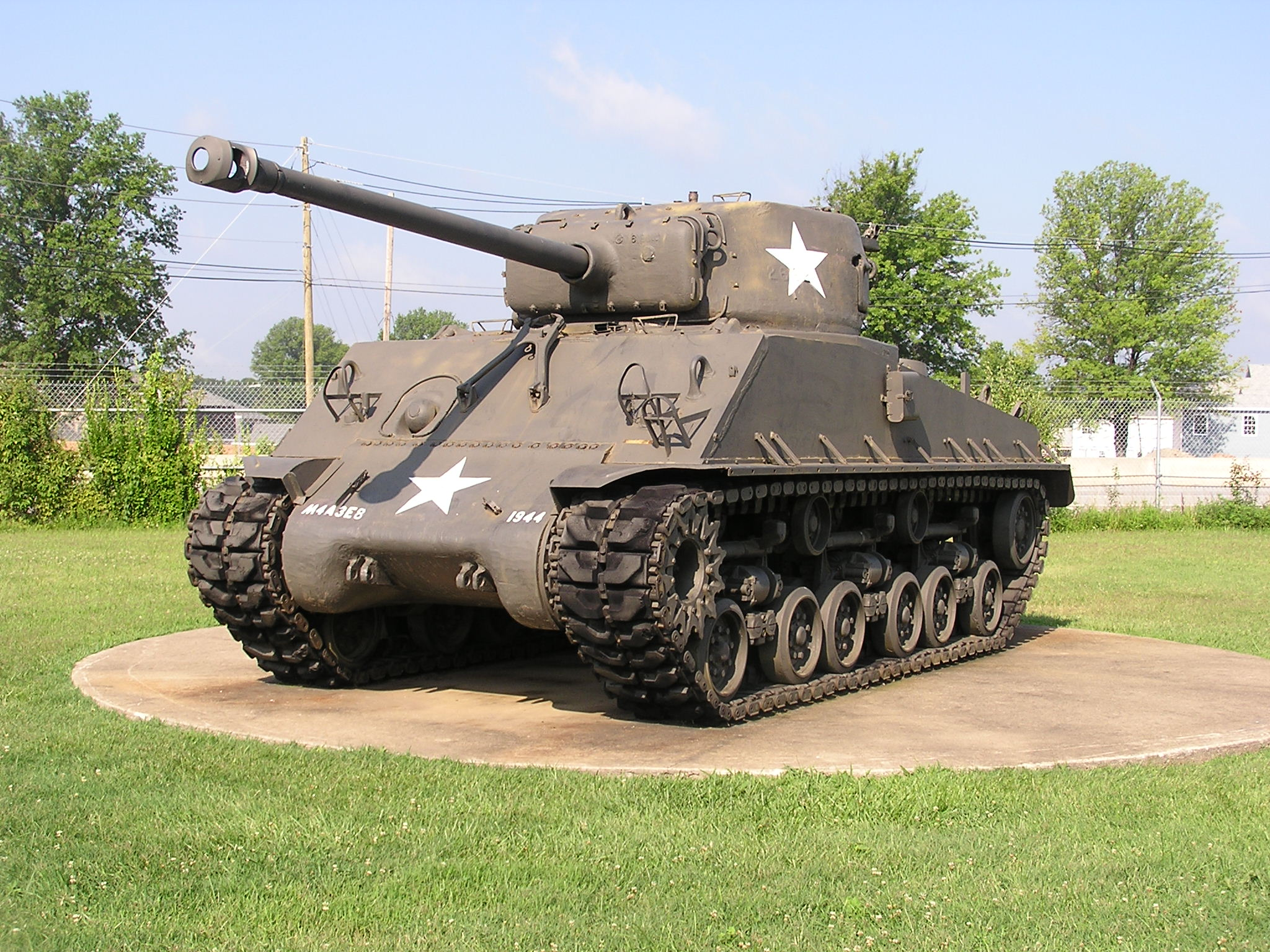
M4 Sherman tank with a late-war 76 mm main gun

After the battle, the 10th Armored Division's 21st Tank Battalion and Combat Command B were awarded the Presidential Unit Citation for their actions from 17 to 27 December 1944 Battle of the Bulge. The 101 Airborne Division was also honored with the Presidential Unit Citation for their actions at Bastogne. Years after the war, General Anthony McAuliffe said "In my opinion, Combat Command B of the 10th Armored Division was never properly credited with their important role in the Bastogne battle."

==== Across the Saar ====
In early February 1945, the 10th reassembled at Metz and was able to rest briefly after rejoining the XX Corps. On 20 February 1945, the 10th again attacked the German defenses. In one day, they broke the German lines, and after 48 hours, the division advanced 85 miles, overran the Saar-Moselle Triangle, and reached the Saar River. The 10th then crossed the Saar and captured Trier and a bridge across the Moselle River. The loss of this heavily defended city caused German defenses to collapse. Generals Dwight Eisenhower and Patton visited the 10th Armored Division to congratulate them.

The division raced through Kaiserslautern, crossed the Rhine River on 28 March 1945, and continued east. The division helped to seize Heilbronn, defended the Crailsheim Salient, and moved south to isolate Stuttgart. As part of the VI Corps the 10th crossed the Danube River on 23 April 1945. By 27 April 1945 it was one of several Seventh Army corps headed towards the Alps to seal off passes out of Germany, reaching Innsbruck, Austria by early May. By 9 May 1945, elements of the 10th had reached Mittenwald, Bavaria, where they halted. The 10th occupied southern Bavaria until September 1945. On 3 October 1945, the division sailed from Marseille, France. It arrived at Newport News, Virginia on 13 October 1945 and was inactivated at Camp Patrick Henry, Virginia on the same day. The 10th Armored Division had captured 650 towns and cities along with 56,000 German prisoners.

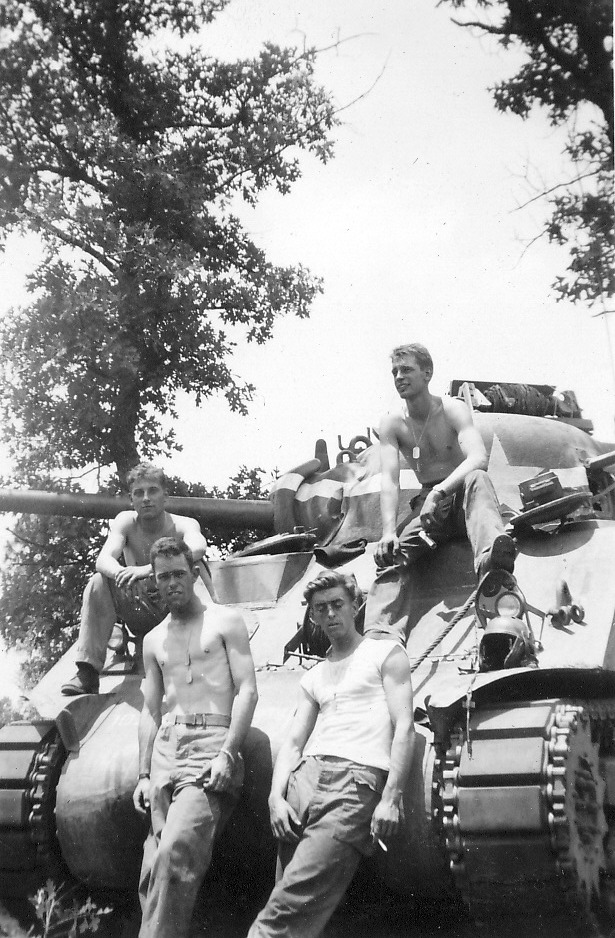
Tigers on break

In one week, the 10th advanced 100 miles and captured 8,000 prisoners from 26 different enemy divisions. After a four-day respite, the 10th was one of several divisions spearheading the Seventh Army drive under General Alexander Patch into Bavaria. With rapid night movements, the "Tigers" continually surprised the Germans. German dispatches referred to the 10th as the "Ghost Division." As it drove into Bavaria, the division overran one of the many subcamps of Dachau concentration camp in the Landsberg area on 27 April 1945, earning it recognition as a liberating unit.

=== Division organization ===
==== Heavy armored division ====
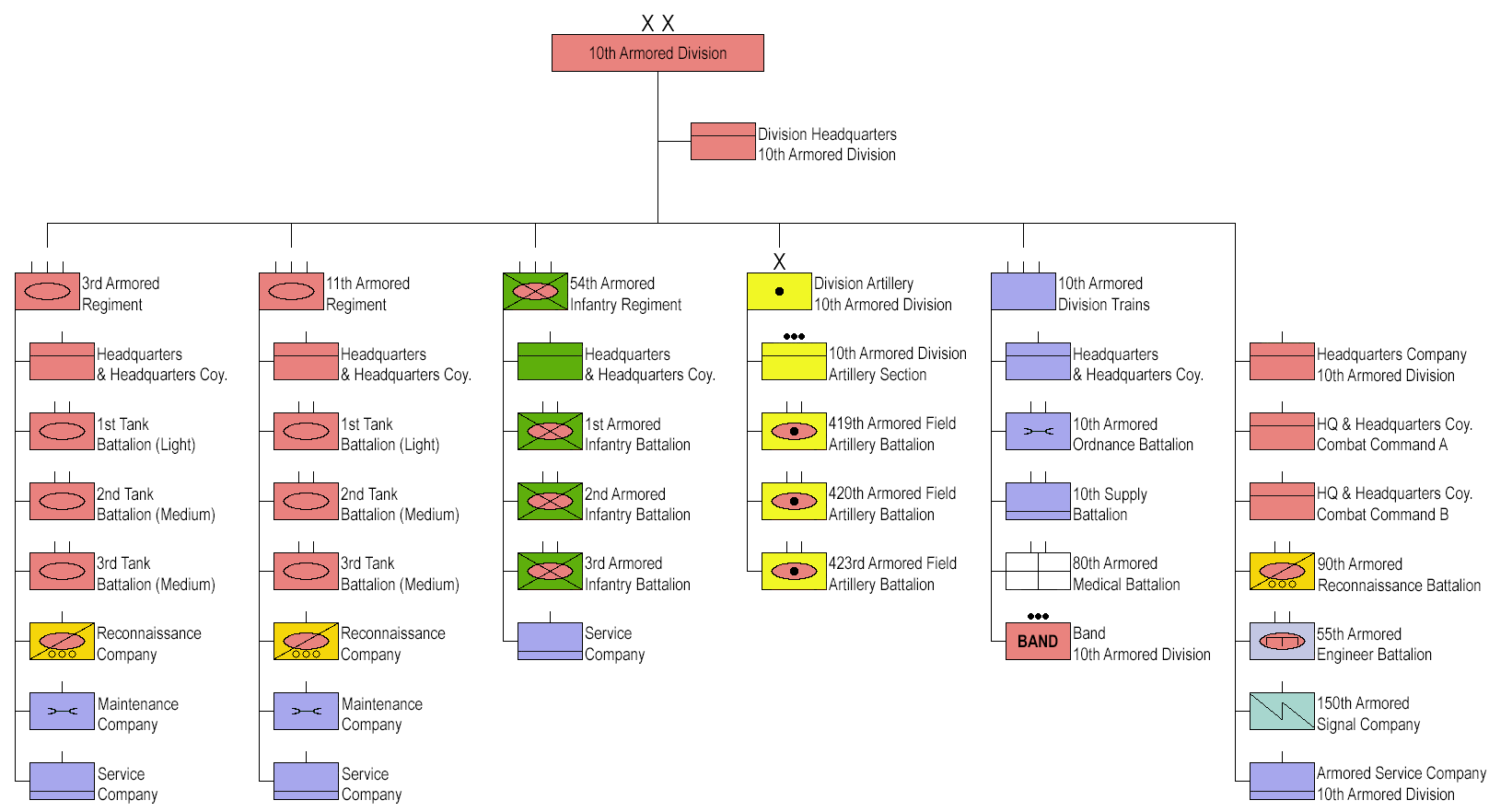
10th Armored Division organization after the division's activation (click to enlarge)

The division was activated as a heavy armored division in 1942. At the time the 10th Armored Division was composed of the following units:

- 10th Armored Division
  - Division Headquarters
  - Headquarters Company, 10th Armored Division
  - Headquarters and Headquarters Company, Combat Command A
  - Headquarters and Headquarters Company, Combat Command B
  - 150th Armored Signal Company
  - Armored Service Company (includes the division's Military Police Platoon)
  - 3rd Armored Regiment
    - Headquarters and Headquarters Company
    - Reconnaissance Company (M3 scout cars and T30 HMC self propelled guns)
    - Maintenance Company
    - Service Company
    - 1st Tank Battalion (Light)
      - Headquarters and Headquarters Company
      - 3× Light Tank companies (A, B, C) (M3/M5 Stuart light tanks)
    - 2nd Tank Battalion (Medium)
      - Headquarters and Headquarters Company
      - 3× Medium Tank companies (D, E, F) (M4 Sherman tanks)
    - 3rd Tank Battalion (Medium)
      - Headquarters and Headquarters Company
      - 3× Medium Tank companies (G, H, I) (M4 Sherman tanks)
  - 11th Armored Regiment
    - same organization as 3rd Armored Regiment
  - 54th Armored Infantry Regiment
    - Headquarters and Headquarters Company
    - 3× Armored infantry battalions
      - each battalion consists of: 1× Headquarters and Headquarters Company, 3× Rifle companies on M3 half-tracks
    - Service Company
  - 90th Armored Reconnaissance Battalion
    - Headquarters and Headquarters Company
    - 3× Reconnaissance companies (M3 scout cars)
    - Light Tank Company (M3/M5 Stuart light tanks)
  - 55th Armored Engineer Battalion
    - Headquarters and Headquarters Company
    - 4× Armored engineer companies
    - Bridge Company
  - 10th Armored Division Artillery
    - 10th Armored Division Artillery Section
    - 419th Armored Field Artillery Battalion
      - Headquarters and Headquarters Battery
      - 3× Field artillery batteries (M7 Priest self propelled howitzers)
      - Service Battery
    - 420th Armored Field Artillery Battalion
      - same organization as 419th Armored Field Artillery Battalion
    - 423rd Armored Field Artillery Battalion
      - same organization as 419th Armored Field Artillery Battalion
  - 10th Armored Division Trains
    - Headquarters and Headquarters Company
    - 14th Armored Ordnance Battalion
      - Headquarters and Headquarters Company
      - 3× Maintenance companies
    - 14th Supply Battalion
      - Headquarters and Headquarters Company
      - 2× Truck companies
    - 80th Armored Medical Battalion
      - Headquarters and Headquarters Company
      - 3× Medical companies
    - 10th Armored Division Band

==== Light armored division ====
Early in 1943, the Army Ground Force began a series of studies to reorganize the various divisions within the Army. After reviewing the tables of organization and after allowing the various commands to review and comment on the proposed restructure, the War Department published on 15 September 1943 a new armored division tables of organization. The restructuring removed the two armored regiments and armored infantry regiment from the table of organization and replaced them with three tank battalions and three armored infantry battalions. Each tank battalion included one light and three medium tank companies. Both Combat Commands, A and B, remained, but an additional Reserve Command was added to the organization. This was a small headquarters element of 10 personnel tasked to clarify command and control in the division's rear area. Armored engineer battalions lost their bridge companies, while their engineer companies were reduced from four to three. The division's cavalry reconnaissance squadron was increased in size to include an HQ Troop, four reconnaissance troops, a light tank company, and an assault gun troop of four platoons (one for each reconnaissance troop). Within the division trains, the division lost its supply battalion and the division's armored service company. These changes pared the division's strength from 14,630 men to 10,937, slashed the number of tanks from 360 to 263, reduced the variety of vehicles to ease repair problems, and eliminated the maintenance-prone motorcycles.

After its reorganization as a light armored division the 10th Armored Division was composed of the following units:

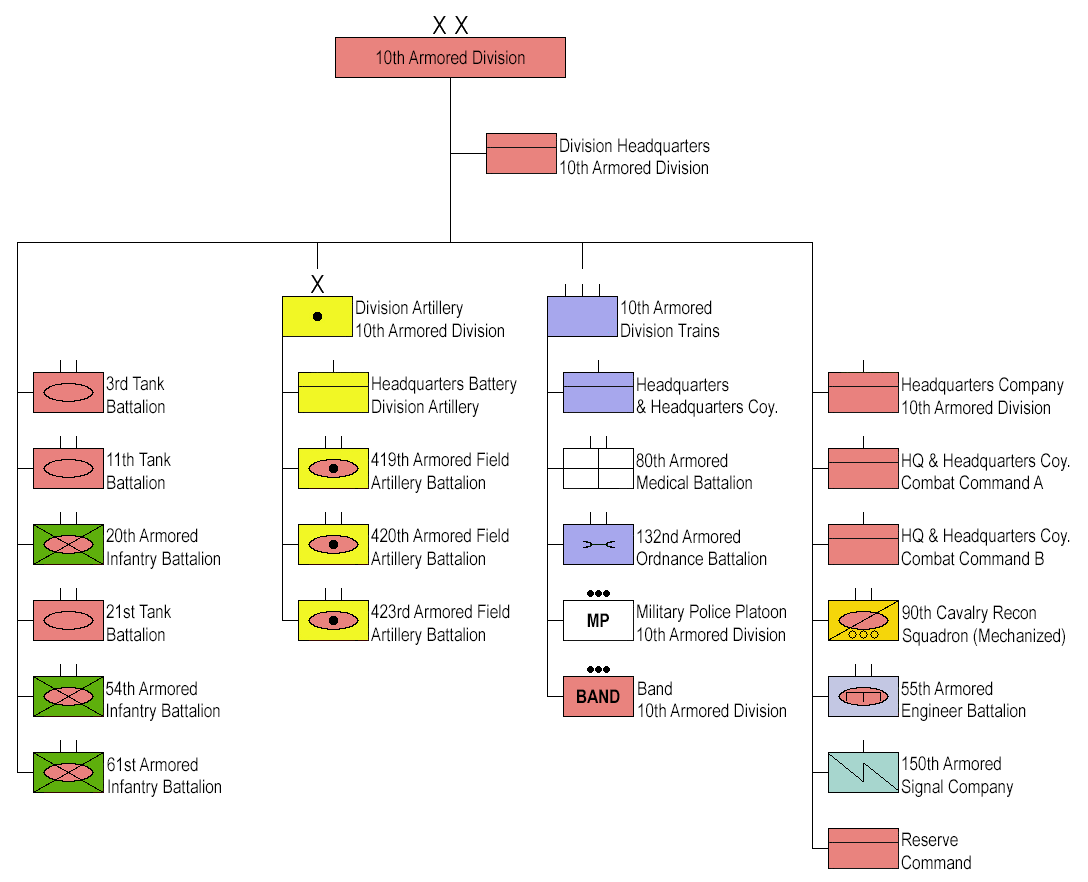
10th Armored Division organization after the division's reorganization (click to enlarge)

- 10th Armored Division
  - Division Headquarters
  - Headquarters Company, 10th Armored Division
  - Headquarters and Headquarters Company, Combat Command A
  - Headquarters and Headquarters Company, Combat Command B
  - 150th Armored Signal Company
  - Reserve Command
  - 3rd Tank Battalion
    - Headquarters and Headquarters Company
    - 3× Medium Tank companies (M4 Sherman tanks)
    - Light Tank Company (M3/M5 Stuart or M24 Chaffee light tanks)
    - Service Company
  - 11th Tank Battalion
    - same organization as 3rd Tank Battalion
  - 21st Tank Battalion
    - same organization as 3rd Tank Battalion
  - 20th Armored Infantry Battalion
    - Headquarters and Headquarters Company
    - 3× Rifle companies (M3 half-tracks)
    - Service Company
  - 54th Armored Infantry Battalion
    - same organization as 20th Armored Infantry Battalion
  - 61st Armored Infantry Battalion
    - same organization as 20th Armored Infantry Battalion
  - 90th Cavalry Reconnaissance Squadron (Mechanized)
    - Headquarters and Headquarters and Service Troop
    - 4× Cavalry reconnaissance troops (M8 Greyhound armored cars)
    - Cavalry Assault Gun Troop (M8 Scott self propelled guns)
    - Light Tank Company (M3/M5 Stuart or M24 Chaffee light tanks)
  - 55th Armored Engineer Battalion
    - Headquarters and Headquarters Company
    - 3× Armored engineer companies
  - 10th Armored Division Artillery
    - Headquarters and Headquarters Battery
    - 419th Armored Field Artillery Battalion
      - Headquarters and Headquarters Battery
      - 3× Field artillery batteries (M7 Priest self propelled howitzers)
      - Service Battery
    - 420th Armored Field Artillery Battalion
      - same organization as 419th Armored Field Artillery Battalion
    - 423rd Armored Field Artillery Battalion
      - same organization as 419th Armored Field Artillery Battalion
  - 10th Armored Division Trains
    - Headquarters and Headquarters Company
    - 80th Armored Medical Battalion
      - Headquarters and Headquarters Company
      - 3× Medical companies
    - 132nd Armored Ordnance Battalion
      - Headquarters and Headquarters Company
      - 3× Maintenance companies
    - Military Police Platoon
    - 10th Armored Division Band

=== Assignments ===
The 10th Armored Division served under the following commands in the ETO:

- 5 September 1944: III Corps, Ninth Army, 12th Army Group.
- 10 October 1944: Third Army, 12th Army Group.
- 23 October 1944: XX Corps.
- 7 December 1944: Third Army, 12th Army Group, but attached to VIII Corps, First Army, 12th Army Group.
- 16 December 1944: XX Corps, Third Army, 12th Army Group, but attached to First Army, 12th Army Group.
- 20 December 1944: III Corps, Third Army, 12th Army Group.
- 21 December 1944: XII Corps.
- 26 December 1944: XX Corps.
- 17 January 1945: Third Army, 12th Army Group, but attached to the XXI Corps, Seventh Army, 6th Army Group.
- 25 January 1945: XV Corps.
- 10 February 1945: XX Corps, Third Army, 12th Army Group.
- 23 March 1945: Third Army, 12th Army Group, but attached to the XXI Corps, Seventh Army, 6th Army Group.
- 1 April 1945: VI Corps, Seventh Army, 6th Army Group.
- 8 April 1945: VI Corps.

=== Casualties ===
- Total battle casualties: 4,031
- Killed in action: 642
- Wounded in action: 3,109
- Missing in action: 64
- Prisoner of war: 216

== In film ==
In the 2001 HBO show, Band of Brothers, a 10th Armored Division officer, George C. Rice, played by comedian/actor Jimmy Fallon, is depicted handing out ammunition and supplies to paratroopers of Easy Company, part of the 2nd Battalion, 506th Parachute Infantry Regiment of the 101st Airborne Division during the Battle of the Bulge.

The 10th Armored Division is also represented in the epic 1970 Academy Award-winning film Patton. General George Patton was played by George C. Scott.

== See also ==
- Kenneth Althaus
- SS Sea Owl – 55th AEB
