= 385th Infantry Regiment =

385th Regiment
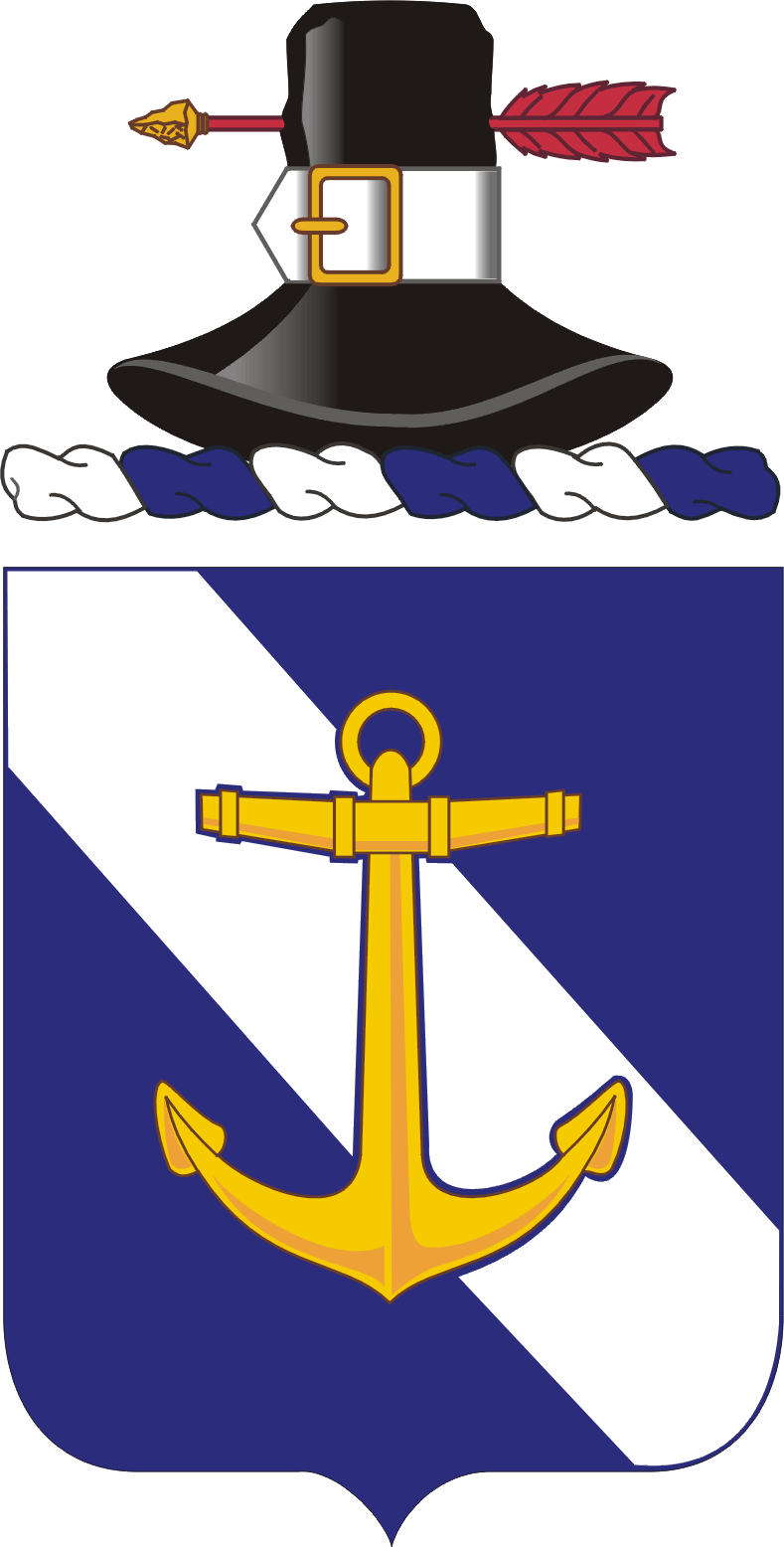
- Coat of arms
- Active: 1918; 1921–1945; 1946–2017
- Country: United States
- Branch: Army Reserve
- Type: Training
- Motto: "Follow Me"
- Engagements: World War II

Insignia
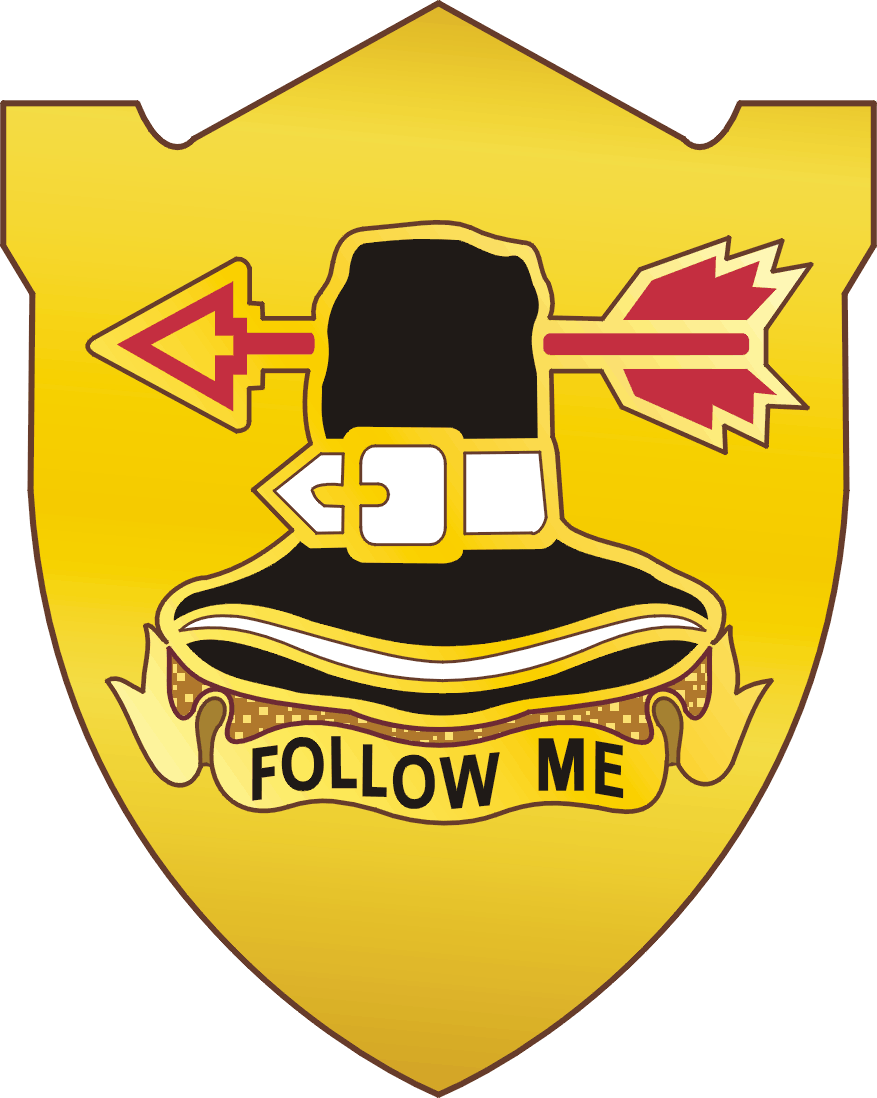
- Distinctive unit insignia

The 385th Infantry Regiment was part of the 76th Infantry Division of the US Army during World War II. It was originally organized in September 1918, composed of National Army draftees mainly from Rhode Island, for deployment during World War I, but was ordered to be demobilized – before having reached its full complement – 19 days after the Armistice of 11 November 1918. It was reconstituted in the Organized Reserves in 1921, becoming fully operational and headquartered in Rhode Island. In 1942, after the United States had entered World War II, the 385th was ordered into active military service. It fought in Germany, including the Siegfried Line. The 385th's 2nd Battalion crossed the Nims River at Niederweis taking the town while the 1st Battalion attacked south between Nims and the Prum toward Irrel. The 3rd Battalion was the first of the regiment to span the Sauer and go into action in Germany.

== Lineage ==
Constituted 5 September 1918 in the National Army as the 385th Infantry and assigned to the 97th Division – a division intended be composed of National Army draftees mainly from New England states, with the 385th drawing from Rhode Island.

- Demobilized 30 November 1918.
- Reconstituted 24 June 1921 in the Organized Reserves as the 385th Infantry and assigned to the 76th Division, (later redesignated as the 76th Infantry Division).
- Organized in December 1921 with headquarters at Providence, Rhode Island.
- Ordered into active military service 15 June 1942 and reorganized at Fort George G. Meade, Maryland.
- Disbanded 31 August 1945 in Germany.
- Reconstituted 7 October 1946 in the Organized Reserves as the 385th Infantry and assigned to the 76th Infantry Division.
- Activated 17 December 1946 with headquarters at Providence, Rhode Island,

(Organized Reserves redesignated 25 March 1948 as the Organized Reserve Corps; redesignated 9 July 1952 as the Army Reserve).

- Reorganized and redesignated 1 May 1959 as the 385th Regiment, an element of the 76th Division (Training), with headquarters at Providence, Rhode Island.
- (Location of headquarters changed 1 April 1960 to Warwick, Rhode Island).
- Reorganized 31 January 1968 to consist of the 1st, 2d, and 3d Battalions, elements of the 76th Division (Training).
- Reorganized 1 October 1994 to consist of the 1st, 2d, and 3d Battalions, elements of the 76th Division (Institutional Training).
- Reorganized 16 October - 16 November 1996 to consist of the 1st, 2d, and 3d Battalions, elements of the 98th Infantry Division (Institutional Training).
- Deactivated in June 2017 due to restructuring of the Army Reserve.

== Honors ==
WWII Campaign Participation Credit

Rhineland; Ardennes-Alsace; Central Europe

== Notable members ==
PVT Audie Murphy, future Medal of Honor recipient

== Distinctive unit insignia ==
- Description

Superimposed on a gold shield 1 1/2 inches (3.8 cm) high, a black felt hat of the Puritan period with white band and gold buckle transfixed horizontally by a red Indian arrow with gold arrowhead outlined red all above and conjoined with a gold motto scroll inscribed "FOLLOW ME" in black letters.

- Symbolism

The hat is of the type worn by Roger Williams, founder of Rhode Island, transfixed by an Indian arrow.

- Background

The distinctive unit insignia was originally approved for the 385th Infantry, Organized Reserves on 9 August 1924. It was redesignated for the 385th Regiment (BCT), Army Reserve on 15 June 1960. The insignia was amended to revise the description of the design on 11 June 1970

== Coat of arms ==
- Blazon
  - Shield: Azure, a bend Argent, overall, in pale an anchor Or, that portion on the bend fimbriated of the first.
  - Crest: From a wreath Argent and Azure, a felt hat of the Puritan period Proper (Black hat, White band and Gold buckle) transfixed fessways by an Indian arrow Gules armed Or.
  - Motto: FOLLOW ME
- Symbolism
  - Shield: The shield is blue and white representing Infantry, the previous unit designation, and displays the Rhode Island anchor.
  - Crest: The crest is a hat of the type worn by Roger Williams, the founder of Rhode Island, transfixed by an Indian arrow.
- Background: The coat of arms was originally approved for the 385th Infantry, Organized Reserves on 4 August 1924. It was amended to change the wording of the blazon on 10 February 1928. The coat of arms was redesignated for the 385th Regiment (BCT), Army Reserve, on 15 June 1960.

== Publication after hostilities ended ==
385th At Ease 29 May 1945 Edition

Page 1

Page 2

Page 3

Page 4

385th At Ease 3 July 1945 Edition

After VE Day

== See also ==
- SS Sea Owl
