= Japanese submarine Ro-56 =

Ro-56 or Japanese submarine Ro-56 may refer to more than one submarine of the Imperial Japanese Navy:

- Japanese submarine Ro-56 (1921), a Type L submarine in commission from 1921 to 1940
- Japanese submarine Ro-56 (1944), a Kaichū type submarine commissioned in 1944 and sunk in 1945
