= SS Sea Owl =

Type C3-S-A2 ship built during World War II

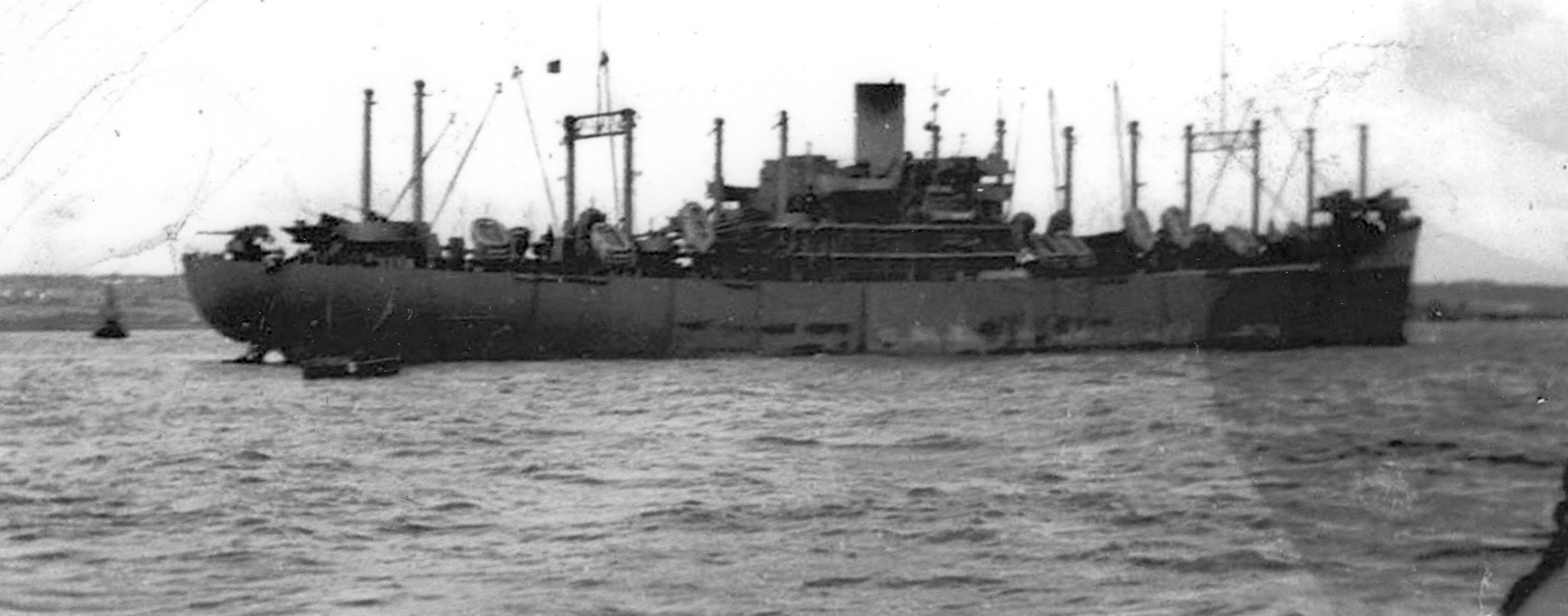
- Sea Owl in November 1944

History
- Name: Sea Owl (1944–1947); Steel Scientist (1947–1971)
- Owner: Maritime Commission (1944–1947); Isthmian Lines, Inc. (1947–1971)
- Operator: War Shipping Administration (1944–1947); Isthmian Lines, Inc. (1947–1971)
- Port of registry: Sea Owl: New Orleans; Steel Scientist: New York
- Ordered: 23 April 1942
- Builder: Ingalls Shipbuilding, Pascagoula, Mississippi
- Yard number: 407; USMC hull #863
- Laid down: 22 July 1943
- Launched: 17 December 1943
- Completed: 27 June 1944
- Acquired: Delivered WSA: 27 June 1944
- In service: 1944
- Out of service: 1971
- Identification: U.S. Official Number: 245730; Signal: Sea Owl: WPIT; Steel Scientist: KRRI
- Fate: Scrapped 1971

General characteristics
- Type: Type C3-S-A2 cargo ship
- Tonnage: 7,886 GRT, 4,600 NRT, 10,700 DWT; 8,027 GRT, 4,670 NRT (Note: After conversion to commercial.)
- Length: 492 ft 0 in (149.96 m) (LOA); 466.5 ft (142.2 m) (registry)
- Beam: 69.6 ft (21.2 m)
- Draft: 28.5 ft (8.7 m)
- Depth: 29.5 ft (9.0 m)
- Decks: 2 decks & open shelter deck
- Propulsion: 2 Westinghouse geared turbines, 2 combustion engineering "D"-type boilers, single propeller
- Speed: 18 knots (33 km/h; 21 mph)
- Capacity: 450,300 cu ft (12,750 m^{3}) (bale); 233,000 cu ft (6,600 m^{3}) as trooper
- Troops: 2,156
- Crew: 53
- Notes: Armament (war time): 2 × single 5"/38 caliber guns (fore and aft); 2 × single 40 mm AA guns; 2 × twin 40 mm AA guns; 18 × single 20 mm AA guns

SS Sea Owl was a Type C3-S-A2 ship built during World War II by Ingalls Shipbuilding, Pascagoula, Mississippi. The ship was converted by Ingalls before delivery on 27 June 1944 into a troop transport for operation by the War Shipping Administration. The ship saw service in the European Theater of Operations with a final trip in January 1946 to Japan and return. The ship was released from troop service in February 1946 and placed in the James River Reserve Fleet 12 August 1946.

Sea Owl was converted to commercial service during 1946 and early 1947 and sold in April 1947 to Isthmian Lines, renamed Steel Scientist and operated commercially until 1971.

== Construction ==
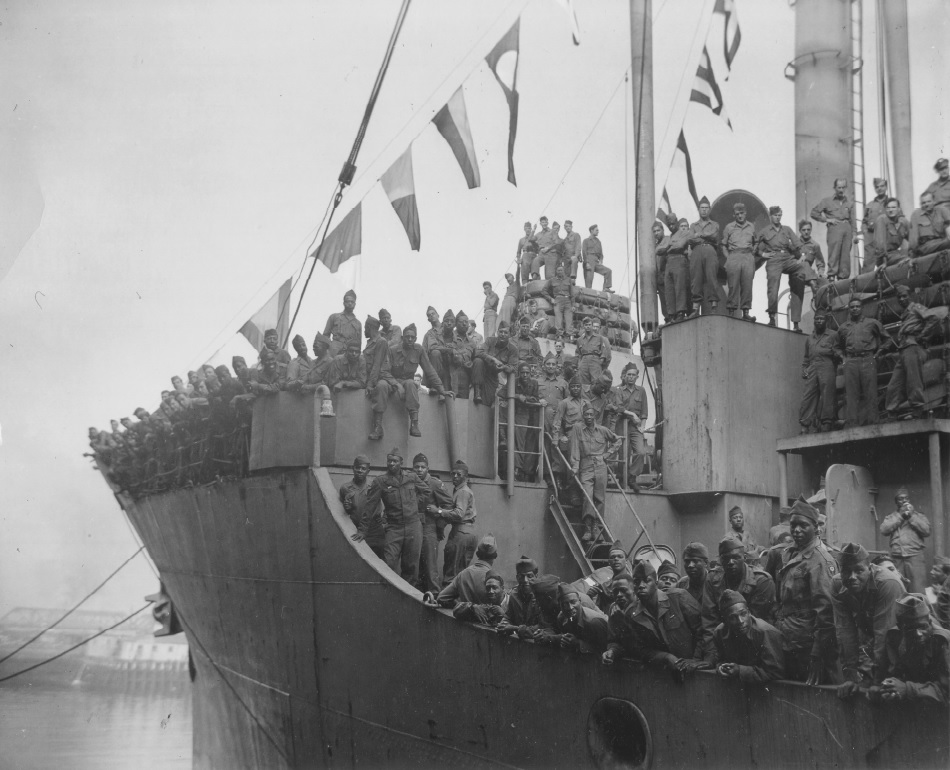
C3-S-A2 troop transports were designed to carry roughly 2,100 troops. Here 1,958 arrive in Boston from Europe on 26 July 1945

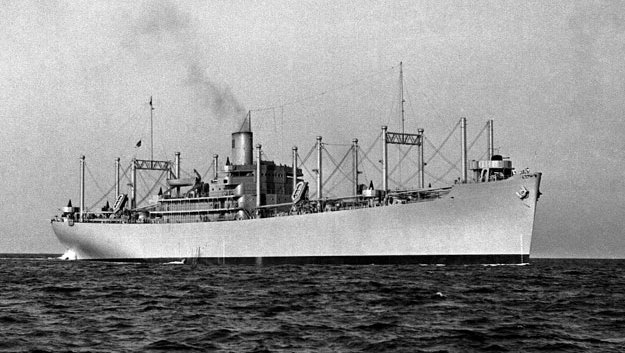
A Type C3-S-A2 troop transport with similar mast configuration

Sea Owl was laid down 22 July 1943 for the U. S. Maritime Commission by Ingalls Shipbuilding Corporation of Pascagoula, Mississippi as a Type C3-S-A2 ship, yard hull 407, USMC hull 863 under a contract of 23 April 1942. The ship was launched on 17 December 1943 and completed on 27 June 1944 by Ingalls as a troop transport with capacity for 2,156 passengers. Sea Owl was registered with U.S. Official Number 245730, Signal WPIT and delivered to the War Shipping Administration for operation the same day for operation under a General Agency Agreement by American Export Lines.

The 1945 U.S. registry information for Sea Owl gives characteristics as 7,886 GRT, 4,600 NRT, 466.5 ft (142.2 m) registry length, 69.6 ft (21.2 m) beam and depth of 29.5 ft (9.0 m), 8,500 horsepower and crew of 53.

== Service history ==
=== War Shipping Administration (1944–1946) ===
Sea Owl was allocated to Army requirements and operated by a United States Merchant Marine crew. A contingent of the US Naval Armed Guard were assigned responsible for the ship's guns. The Army allocation led to erroneous conclusions the ship was an Army Transport, designated USAT, which was a term applied to ships owned or bareboat chartered by the Army. All ships engaged in Army troop transport had a complement of the US Army Transportation Corps (Water Division) and a representative of the Port of Embarkation (Note: The Army commands responsible for all Army troop and cargo shipments were the Ports of Embarkation which commanded not only the port facilities but shipments of troops and supplies from points of origin through the ports and to their destination. See New York Port of Embarkation for a description of the major port in operation in World War I and World War II.) commander assigned, a Transport Commander, in command of all Army passengers but not the ship.

Sea Owl's shakedown cruise was from Pascagoula to New York City, followed by a voyage to Newport News, Virginia, to pick up her first troop complement, an Army battalion headed for Naples. The ship departed Hampton Roads Port of Embarkation at Norfolk on 27 July 1944 and returned to New York on 31 August. During the remainder of 1944 the ship made two trips from the New York Port of Embarkation to Europe. The first departed on 12 September for Milford Haven and Cherbourg, France. The second was on 22 October for the Mersey, the Bristol Channel and Avonmouth with return to the Boston Port of Embarkation on 16 November. On 24 November the ship sailed for Southampton with return to New York on 22 December 1944.

The first four voyages of 1945 were from New York. On 10 January 1945 Sea Owl departed New York for The Solent, Le Havre, Plymouth and Southampton. The ship then departed again for Le Havre and The Solent on 27 February. Southampton was again the destination of a voyage on 4 April. On 10 May the ship again departed New York for Le Havre and Southampton with a return to Boston from which the ship departed on 8 June for Le Havre returning to New York. On 22 July 1945 a change was made as war in Europe ended with a mission to redeploy troops to the Pacific. The ship departed New York for Gibraltar, Leghorn and Naples but instead Sea Owl was diverted to Boston. The ship then operated out of Boston to Europe with a voyage on 24 August for Le Havre. On 15 September the destination was Marseille with a return to Hampton Roads. From there the ship sailed on 13 October again for Marseille and again on 10 November for Naples and Marseille with return to Hampton Roads on 5 December 1945.

On 15 December 1945 Sea Owl departed Hampton Roads to transit the Panama Canal for the Pacific arriving 14 January 1946 at Nagoya. With a stop at Incheon, Korea (named Jinsen during Japanese occupation) the ship returned to the Seattle Port of Embarkation 14 February 1946 to complete troop transport service.

==== Units transported ====
Units transported included:

- The 55th Armored Engineer Battalion of the 10th Armored Division, departed New York POE 12 September 1944, arrived Cherbourg France, 23 September.
- 289th Engineer Combat Battalion, departed New York 22 October 1944, arrived Bristol, England, 1 November 1944.
- 1240th Engineer Combat Battalion (same as above).
- 1251st Engineer Combat Battalion (same as above).
- 385th Infantry Regiment (76th Infantry Division), left the Boston Port of Embarkation 23 November 1944, arrived Southampton 4 December 1944.
- 661st Tank Destroyer Battalion of the 63rd Infantry, left New York 9 January 1945, arrived Le Harve, France 23 January 1945.
- 57th Fighter Group, departed Naples 6 August 1945, headed for deployment in the Pacific Theater. Just before the Panama Canal the Japanese surrendered was announced and the Sea Owl turned around and arrived in Boston on 18 August 1945.
- 644th Tank Destroyer Battalion, 82nd Airborne Division, France to Newport News, Virginia, late 1945.

Sea Owl was also used to transport German POWs to the United States.

=== Isthmian Lines (1947–1971) ===
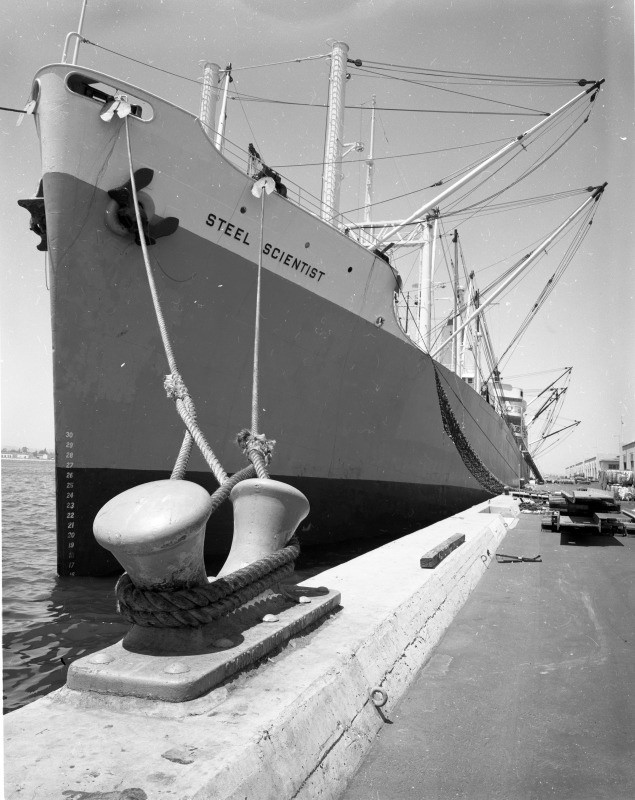
Steel Scientist in 1961

Sea Owl was transferred to the Maritime Commission in 1946. A $282,000 contract for conversion into a cargo ship was awarded to J.K. Welding Co., of Yonkers, NY, to be completed in 70 calendar days. In 1947 she was sold to Isthmian Lines of New York.

Beginning in 1947 it operated in Isthmian service as SS Steel Scientist hauling cargoes from Asia principally to U.S. Gulf ports carrying jute, gunnie sacks, shellac, and other materials. She was sold to Taiwan Shipbreakers, arrived at Kaohsiung 9 July 1971 and scrapped during that month.

== See also ==
- Operation Magic Carpet
