= T55 =

T55 may refer to:

== Aviation ==
- de Havilland Vampire T.55, a British-built trainer
- English Electric Lightning T.55, a British-built trainer
- Honeywell T55, a turboshaft engine
- Slingsby T.55 Regal Eagle, a British record-setting glider

== Other uses ==
- T-55, a Soviet tank
- Bestune T55, a Chinese crossover utility vehicle
- Cooper T55, a Formula One racing car
- Utility Vehicle, Tracked, Infantry, T55, an American prototype armored personnel carrier
- T55E1 gun motor carriage, an American prototype tank destroyer
