= 3-inch gun M5 =

WW2 US anti-tank gun

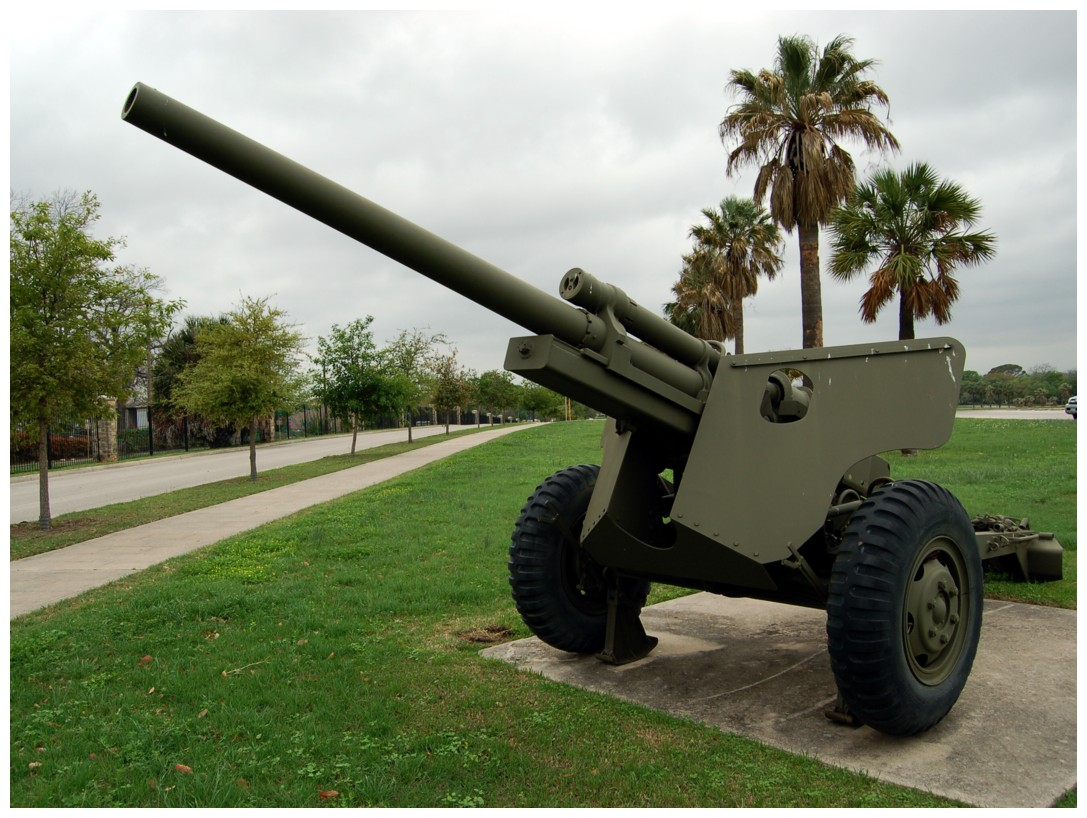
- M5 on carriage M6 on display at Fort Sam Houston, Texas
- Type: Anti-tank gun
- Place of origin: United States

Service history
- In service: 1943–1945
- Used by: United States
- Wars: World War II

Production history
- Produced: December 1942 – June 1943; November–December 1943; April–September 1944
- No. built: 2,500

Specifications
- Mass: combat: 2,210 kg (4,872 lbs)
- Length: 7.1 m (23 ft 4 in)
- Barrel length: 3.4 m (11 ft 2 in), L/45
- Width: 2.2 m (7 ft 3 in)
- Height: 1.62 m (5 ft 4 in)
- Crew: 9
- Shell: 76.2 × 585 mmR (R/103mm)
- Caliber: 3 in (76.2 mm)
- Breech: Horizontal-block
- Recoil: Hydro-pneumatic
- Carriage: Split trail
- Elevation: −5° to +30°
- Traverse: 45°
- Rate of fire: 12 rounds per minute
- Muzzle velocity: 792 m/s (2,600 ft/s) with AP/APCBC rounds
- Maximum firing range: 14.7 km (9.13 mi)

The 3-inch gun M5 was an anti-tank gun developed in the United States during World War II. The gun combined a 3-inch (76.2 mm) barrel of the anti-aircraft gun T9 and elements of the 105 mm howitzer M2. The M5 was issued exclusively to the US Army tank destroyer battalions starting in 1943. It saw combat in the Italian Campaign and on the Western Front in Northwest Europe.

While the M5 outperformed earlier anti-tank guns in the US service, its effective employment was hindered by its heavy weight and ammunition-related issues. Losses suffered by towed TD battalions in the Battle of the Bulge and the existence of more mobile, better protected alternatives in the form of self-propelled tank destroyers led to gradual removal of the M5 from front line service in 1945.

== Development and production history ==
In 1940, the US Army just started to receive its first anti-tank gun, the 37 mm gun M3. While it fit the request of the Infantry for a light, easy to manhandle anti-tank weapon, the Field Artillery and Ordnance Department foresaw a need for a more powerful gun. This led to a number of expedient designs, such as variations of the 75 mm gun M1897.

Late in 1940, the Ordnance Department started another project – an anti-tank gun based on the 3 inch anti-aircraft gun T9. The barrel of the T9 was combined with breech, recoil system and carriage, from the 105 mm howitzer M2. The pilot of the weapon, named 3 inch gun T10, was ready by September 1941. Although the subsequent testing revealed minor problems, it was clear that the gun, eventually standardized as M5 on carriage M1, presented major performance improvement over existing designs.

Production began in December 1942. In November 1943, a slightly modified carriage was standardized as M6. In this carriage, a flat shield borrowed from the 105 mm howitzer was replaced by a new sloped one. In January 1944, AGF requested an upgrade of those guns built with the early carriage M1 to the carriage M6; consequently most of the guns that reached the frontline had the M6 carriage.

Production of M5, pieces.
| Month | M5 |
|---|---|
| December 1942 | 250 |
| January 1943 | 200 |
| February 1943 | 190 |
| March 1943 | 100 |
| April 1943 | 100 |
| May 1943 | 100 |
| June 1943 | 60 |
| July–October 1943 | – |
| November 1943 | 98 |
| December 1943 | 402 |
| January–March 1944 | - |
| April 1944 | 160 |
| May 1944 | 200 |
| June 1944 | 200 |
| July 1944 | 175 |
| August 1944 | 137 |
| September 1944 | 128 |
| Total | 2,500 |

== Description ==
External image
- 3 inch Gun M5 on Carriage M1

The barrel was adapted from the 3-inch gun T9; it had rifling with a uniform right-hand twist, with 28 grooves and one turn in 25 inches. Barrel length was 13.16 feet. It was combined with breech, recoil system and carriage from the 105 mm Howitzer M2. The breech was of horizontal sliding type, manual; the recoil system hydro-pneumatic. The carriage was of split trail type, equipped with a single equilibrator spring beneath the breech and wheels with pneumatic tires.

== Organization ==
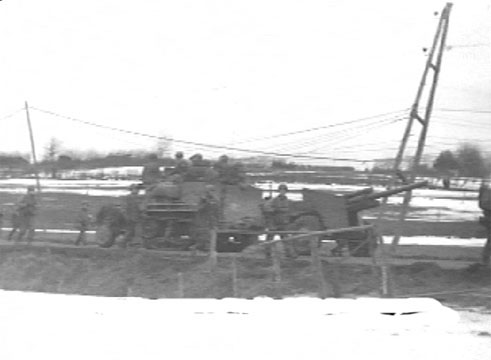
3 inch M5 pulled by a halftrack

Despite the performance advantages, it turned out that no branch of the US Army wanted the new gun. The Infantry considered it too large and heavy. The other possible user, the Tank Destroyer Center, preferred more mobile self-propelled weapons. Finally, pressure from the head of Army Ground Forces, Gen. Lesley McNair, resulted in the gun being adopted by the TD Center. McNair's opinion was apparently influenced by the experience of the North African Campaign, where self-propelled guns were found to be hard to conceal.

On 31 March 1943, AGF ordered 15 self-propelled tank destroyer battalions to convert to a towed form; eventually, AGF decided that half of the TD battalions should be towed. A towed TD battalion possessed 36 pieces, in three companies of 12. M3 Halftracks were issued as prime movers. The organization from 1 September 1944 authorized M39 armored utility vehicle instead, but these only reached the frontline in spring 1945.

Those towed tank destroyer battalions were attached to US Army divisions to improve their anti-tank capabilities. Most often, a complete battalion was attached to an infantry division. In some cases, towed TD battalions were attached to armored or airborne divisions; sometimes, companies of the same battalion were given to different divisions; and sometimes a single division had several TD battalions – including a mix between towed and self-propelled – at once.

== Combat service ==
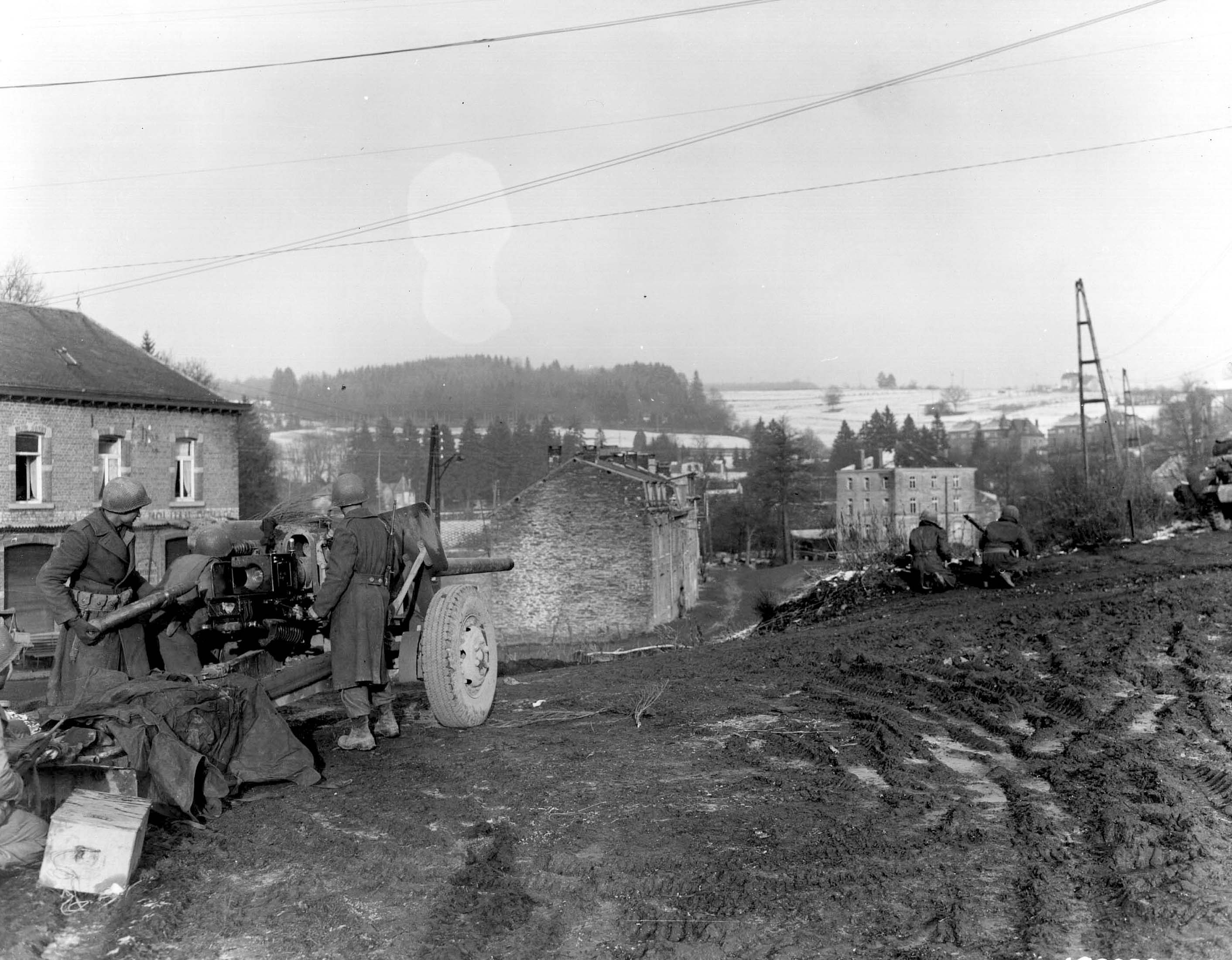
M5 near Vielsalm, Belgium, 23 December 1944

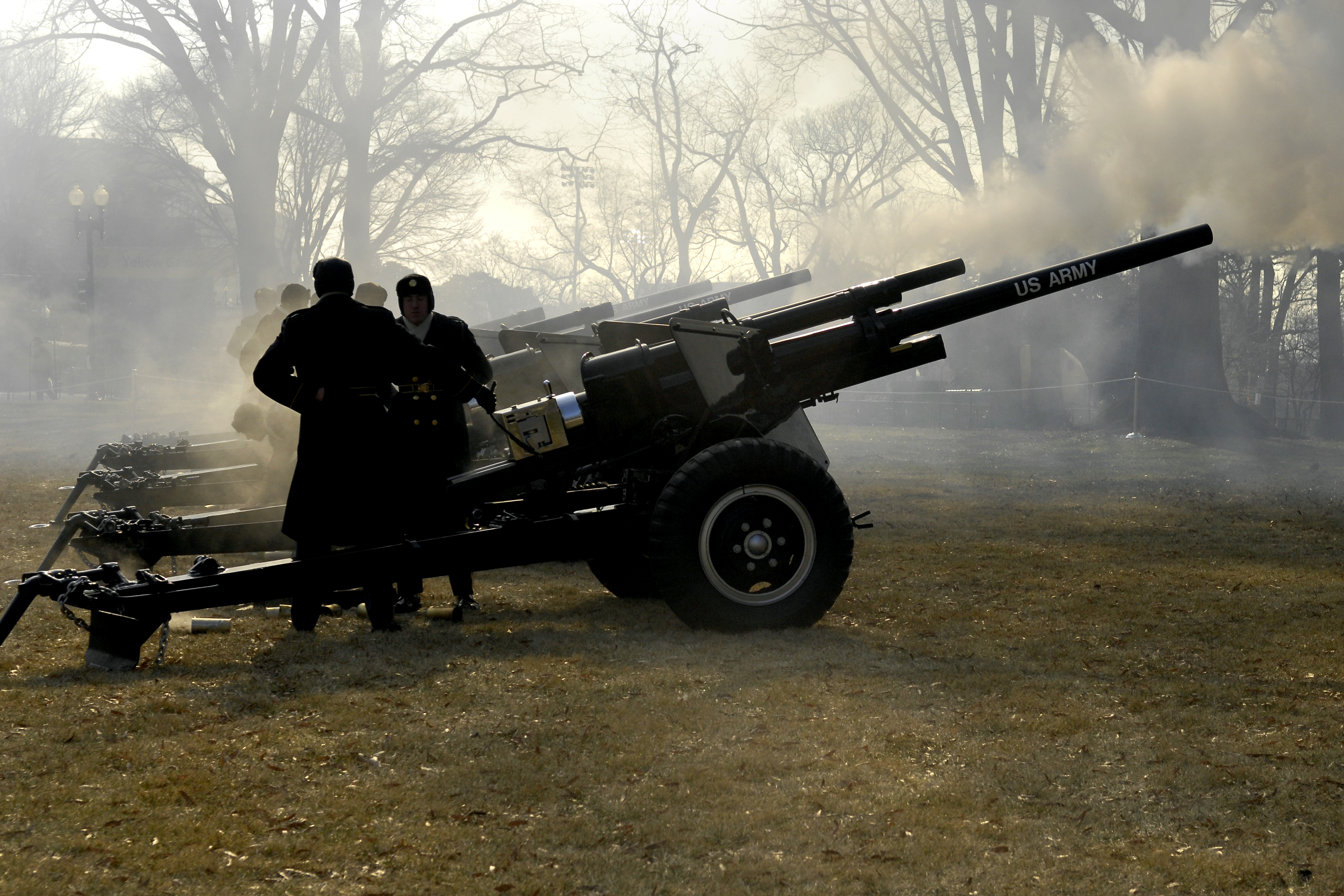
The Presidential Salute Guns Battery fires its modified M5 guns outside of the U.S. Capitol, during the 2009 Presidential Inauguration

In October 1943, the first towed battalion – the 805th – arrived in Italy. Subsequently, the M5 saw combat in the Italian Campaign and in the Northwest Europe. One of the most notable engagements came during the German counterattack on Mortain in August 1944. The 823rd Tank Destroyer Battalion, attached to the 30th Infantry Division, played a key role in the successful defence of Saint Barthelemy, destroying fourteen tanks and a number of other vehicles, though at the price of losing eleven of its guns.

In addition to the anti-tank role, the gun was often used to supplement divisional field artillery or to provide direct fire against enemy fortifications (e.g. a combat report from the 614th TD mentioned a two-gun section firing 143 shells at an enemy post, achieving 139 hits).

Although the M5 easily outperformed older anti-tank guns in the US service, it was large and heavy – making it hard to manhandle into position – and its anti-armor characteristics were found to be somewhat disappointing. An APDS round was never developed for the M5; an APCR round existed (see ammunition table below), but it is not clear if it was ever issued to towed TD battalions.

As a result of the aforementioned shortcomings, commanders and troops generally preferred an alternative in form of self-propelled tank destroyers, which offered better mobility and also better protection for their crews.

The greatest test of the TD battalions and their M5 guns came during the Battle of the Bulge. In this battle, towed tank destroyer units fought much less successfully and suffered much higher losses than self-propelled ones. In the First U.S. Army, tank destroyer losses were 119, of which 86 were 3-inch guns. In defensive actions against German tank attacks, self-propelled tank destroyers succeeded 14 times out of 16, while 3-inch guns did so only 2 out of 9 times. The ratio of friendly to enemy losses was 1:1.3 in towed units, but a much better 1:6 in self-propelled units. A report from the aforementioned 823rd Tank Destroyer Battalion said that "tank destroyer guns were one by one flanked by enemy tanks and personnel driven from guns by small arms and machine gun fire". Taking the recent combat experience into account, on 11 January 1945, the War Department confirmed a request to convert the towed TD battalions to the self-propelled form. This decision meant the gradual removal of the M5 from frontline service, a process that continued until the end of the war in Europe.

Today, the M5 is utilized by the US Army for ceremonial purposes. The Presidential Salute Guns Platoon of The Old Guard currently maintains a battery of ten M5s at Fort Myer for service mainly in the National Capital Region.

== Ammunition ==
The M5 used fixed ammunition, with the same 76.2x585R cartridge case – designated 3 inch Cartridge Case Mk IIM2 – as other descendants of the 3 inch M1918 anti-aircraft gun, and had basically the same barrel. This meant that the gun had the same anti-tank characteristics as those of vehicle mounted anti-tank guns derived from the T9, namely the M6 (used in the 3 inch Gun Motor Carriage M5, which never reached production) and the M7 (which was the main armament of the 3-inch gun motor carriage M10 and the M6 heavy tank). The ballistic characteristics of the gun were also essentially the same as the 76 mm gun M1, which fired the same projectiles with different cartridge case.

The table below lists ammunition available for the three guns. It is possible that some types (e.g. the APCR round) were never issued to towed TD battalions.

Available ammunition
| Type | Model | Weight (round/projectile) | Filler | Muzzle velocity |
| AP-T | AP M79 shot | 12.05 / 6.8 kg (26.56 / 15 lbs) | - | 792 m/s (2,600 ft/s) |
| APCBC/HE-T | APC M62 projectile | 12.36 / 7 kg (27.24 / 15.43 lbs) | | 792 m/s (2,600 ft/s) |
| APCR-T | HVAP M93 shot | 9.42 / 4.26 kg (20.76 / 9.39 lbs) | - | 1,036 m/s (3,400 ft/s) |
| HE | HE M42A1 shell | 11. 3 / 5.84 kg; (25 / 12.87 lbs) | TNT, 390 g | 853 m/s (2,800 ft/s) |
| Smoke | Smoke M88 shell | 6.99 / 3.35 kg (15.41 / 7.38 lbs) | Zinc chloride (HC) | 274 m/s (900 ft/s) |
| Target practice | TP M85 shot |
| Practice | Practice M42B2 shell |

Penetration at range (90 degrees) uses American and British 50% success criteria, allowing direct comparison to foreign gun performance.
| Ammunition type | Muzzle velocity (m/s) | Penetration (mm) | | | | | | | | | | |
| Ammunition type | Muzzle velocity (m/s) | 100 m | 250 m | 500 m | 750 m | 1000 m | 1250 m | 1500 m | 1750 m | 2000 m | 2500 m | 3000 m |
|---|---|---|---|---|---|---|---|---|---|---|---|---|
| M62 versus FHA | 792 m/s (2,600 ft/s) | 124 | 123 | 121 | 118 | 115 | 111 | 107 | 102 | 97 | 87 | 77 |
| M62 versus RHA | 792 m/s (2,600 ft/s) | 124 | 121 | 115 | 109 | 103 | 98 | 93 | 88 | 84 | 76 | 68 |
| M79 versus FHA | 792 m/s (2,600 ft/s) | 132 | 124 | 112 | 101 | 92 | 83 | 75 | 68 | 62 | 50 | 41 |
| M79 versus RHA | 792 m/s (2,600 ft/s) | 154 | 145 | 131 | 119 | 107 | 97 | 88 | 79 | 72 | 59 | 48 |
| M93 | 1,036 m/s (3,400 ft/s) | 239 | 227 | 208 | 191 | 175 | 160 | 147 | 135 | 124 | 108 | 88 |

== See also ==
- List of U.S. Army weapons by supply catalog designation (SNL C-40)

=== Weapons of comparable role, performance and era ===
- 7.5 cm Pak 40 – Approximate German equivalent
- 3-inch anti-aircraft gun M3 – The 50 caliber successor to the M1918
