= 3-inch M1917 anti-aircraft gun =

American anti-aircraft gun

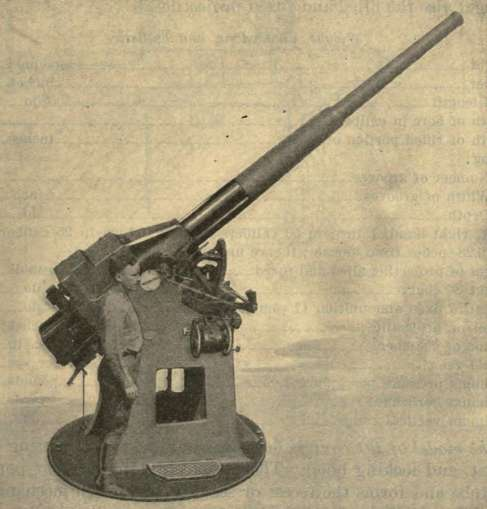
- Type: Anti-aircraft gun
- Place of origin: United States

Service history
- Used by: United States
- Wars: World War 1

Production history
- Designed: 1915
- Manufacturer: United States Army
- Produced: 1915–1919

Specifications
- Shell: Fixed ammunition
- Caliber: 3-inch (76.2 mm)
- Traverse: 360°

The 3-inch M1917 anti-aircraft gun was an American anti-aircraft gun which was produced from 1915 to 1919.

== History ==
The 3-inch M1917 anti-aircraft gun was the first United States Army dedicated anti-aircraft gun. It was in service throughout World War I and early World War II. It was only deployed in limited quantities on fixed mounts. It was soon supplemented by a newer mobile model, the 3-inch M1918 anti-aircraft gun. Very few were manufactured; as of April 1919, there were a total of 116. Its use was highly limited.

Production started in 1915 and ended in 1919 after World War I. It was based on the 3-inch M1903 seacoast gun, and equipped with a coastal-defense gun barrel on a high elevations. A majority of the completed guns were deployed with the United States Army Coast Artillery Corps (CAC) at seacoast forts during and after World War I. It remained in military service through early World War II, during or after which it was officially retired from service.
