= 805th Tank Destroyer Battalion =

- Active: 1941–1945
- Disbanded: 1945
- Country: United States
- Allegiance: Army
- Part of: Independent unit
- Equipment: 3" anti-tank guns; M3 GMC; M10 tank destroyer; M18 Hellcat

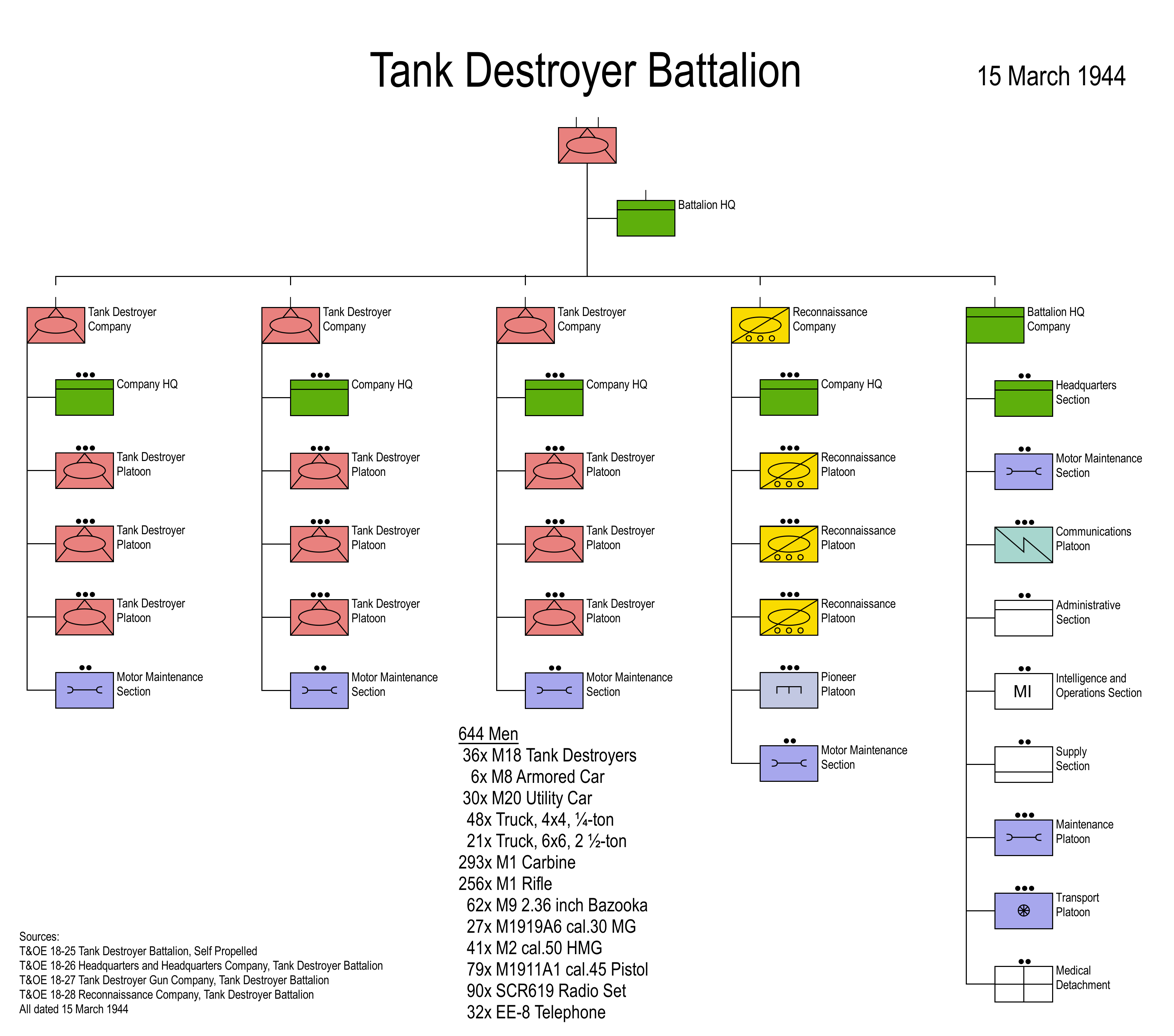
Tank Destroyer Battalion (SP) Structure—March 1944

The 805th Tank Destroyer Battalion was a tank destroyer battalion of the United States Army active during the Second World War.

The battalion was formed from the 105th Antitank Battalion on 15 December 1941, in line with the reorganization of the anti-tank force. It was shipped to the United Kingdom in August 1942, and then deployed for the North African campaign in January 1943, equipped with M3 GMC tank destroyers. It was attached briefly to the 34th Infantry Division, then attached to the 1st Armored Division on 20 February, just in time to see action at the Battle of the Kasserine Pass, where it took heavy losses. On 23 March, equipped with the new M10 tank destroyer, it fought at the Battle of El Guettar.

In October 1943 it converted to a towed battalion equipped with 3" anti-tank guns, and was shipped to Italy, arriving in the Naples area on 25 October—the first 3" towed battalion to see combat. It was attached to the 34th Infantry Division in January 1944, and supported the division in fighting on the Bernhardt Line and at Monte Cassino, before being shipped to the Anzio beachhead in mid-March and attached to the 36th Infantry Division. In June, it was attached to the 1st Armored Division.

It re-equipped with M18 Hellcats in the summer of 1944, but continued to be used mainly for indirect-fire missions through the remainder of the war, attached to a variety of different units during the drive north. On 21 April 1945, they were attached to the 34th Infantry Division when it captured Bologna, and with the 88th Infantry Division when it reached the Brenner Pass in early May.
