= T40/M9 tank destroyer =

WWII US anti-tank prototype

3-inch gun motor carriage T40
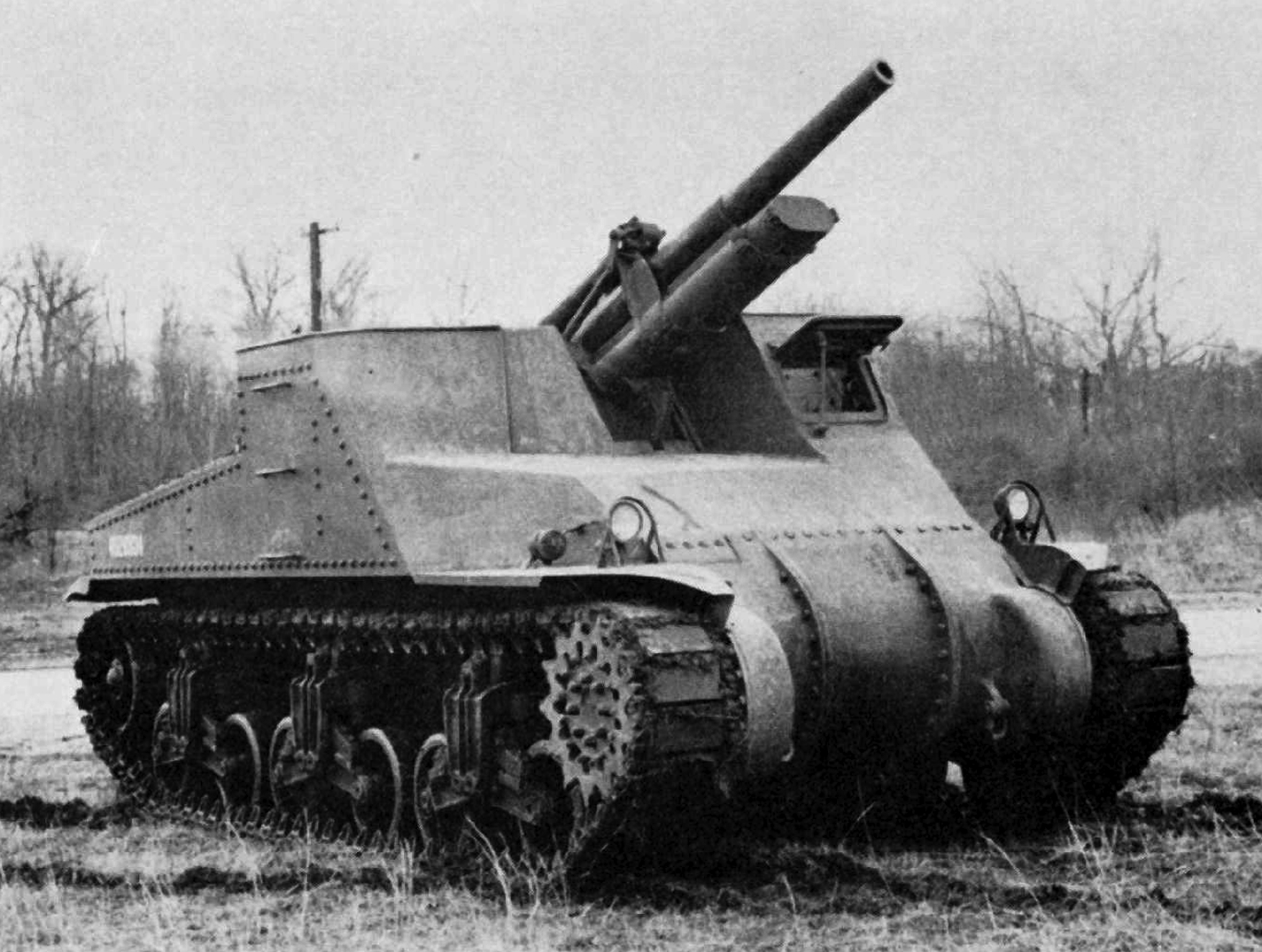
- 3-inch gun motor carriage T40 (M9)
- Type: Tank destroyer
- Place of origin: United States

Production history
- Produced: 1941/1942
- No. built: 1

Specifications
- Mass: 33 tons
- Length: 18.54 ft (5.65 m)
- Width: 8.86 ft (2.70 m)
- Height: 10.24 ft (3.12 m)
- Crew: 5
- Main armament: 3-inch gun M1918
- Engine: Wright R975 EC2
- Maximum speed: 25 mi (40 km)

The 3-inch gun motor carriage T40, later given the production model number M9 was a US tank destroyer (a self-propelled anti-tank gun), of the early part of World War II. It mounted a 3-inch anti-aircraft gun on a M3 medium tank hull. A small production run of 50 tanks was planned in 1942. This was cancelled due to the unavailability of suitable guns, and the entry into production of a similar vehicle, the M10 GMC tank destroyer which used a later version of the gun.

== History ==
The M3 hull was used as the basis for a tank destroyer mounting the 3-inch gun, a reworked World War-era weapon - by removing the turret, sponson gun and hull roof. It was developed in September 1941 but in tests the resulting vehicle was judged to be too tall and the gun mount was not suitable for mass production so the T24 project was cancelled in 1942.

The T40 was the T24 prototype rebuilt by Baldwin Locomotive Works in 1942 on the existing M3 Lee chassis to use redundant 3-inch M1918 anti-aircraft guns. The gun mounting was lower than the T24; on the T24 the gun had been level with the original hull roof. Fifty guns were thought to be available, and following successful trials of the T40, the design was standardized with designation M9 GMC with a "limited standard" production of fifty vehicles in April 1942. However only 28 guns were available and the M9s were not expected to be complete by the time the superior M10 tank destroyer design was in production, so the M9 was cancelled in August 1942.

As well as doubts in the Ordnance Board about the design, the Tank Destroyer Board felt that the vehicle was too slow.

== See also ==
- List of the United States military vehicles by model number
- Tanks of the United States
