= Slingsby Capstan =

T.49 Capstan
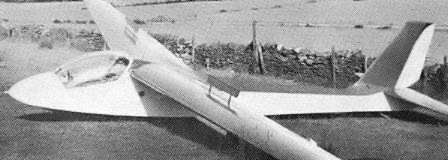
- Slingsby T.49 Capstan in 1966

General information
- Type: Sailplane
- National origin: United Kingdom
- Manufacturer: Slingsby Sailplanes Ltd
- Number built: 34

History
- First flight: 1961

The Slingsby T.49 Capstan is a British two-seat glider of the 1960s built by Slingsby Sailplanes as a replacement for their earlier Type 42 Eagle.

== Design and development ==
The Capstan is a high-winged monoplane of wooden construction, the last two-seat wooden glider built by Slingsby, intended for both training and general club flying. Side-by-side seats for the two pilots are accommodated in an enclosed cockpit with a one-piece perspex canopy. The prototype T.49A first flew in 1961, and it entered production as the T.49B in 1963. Thirty-four Capstans were built, one of which was fitted with an auxiliary engine with the designation T.49C Powered Capstan.

== Specifications ==
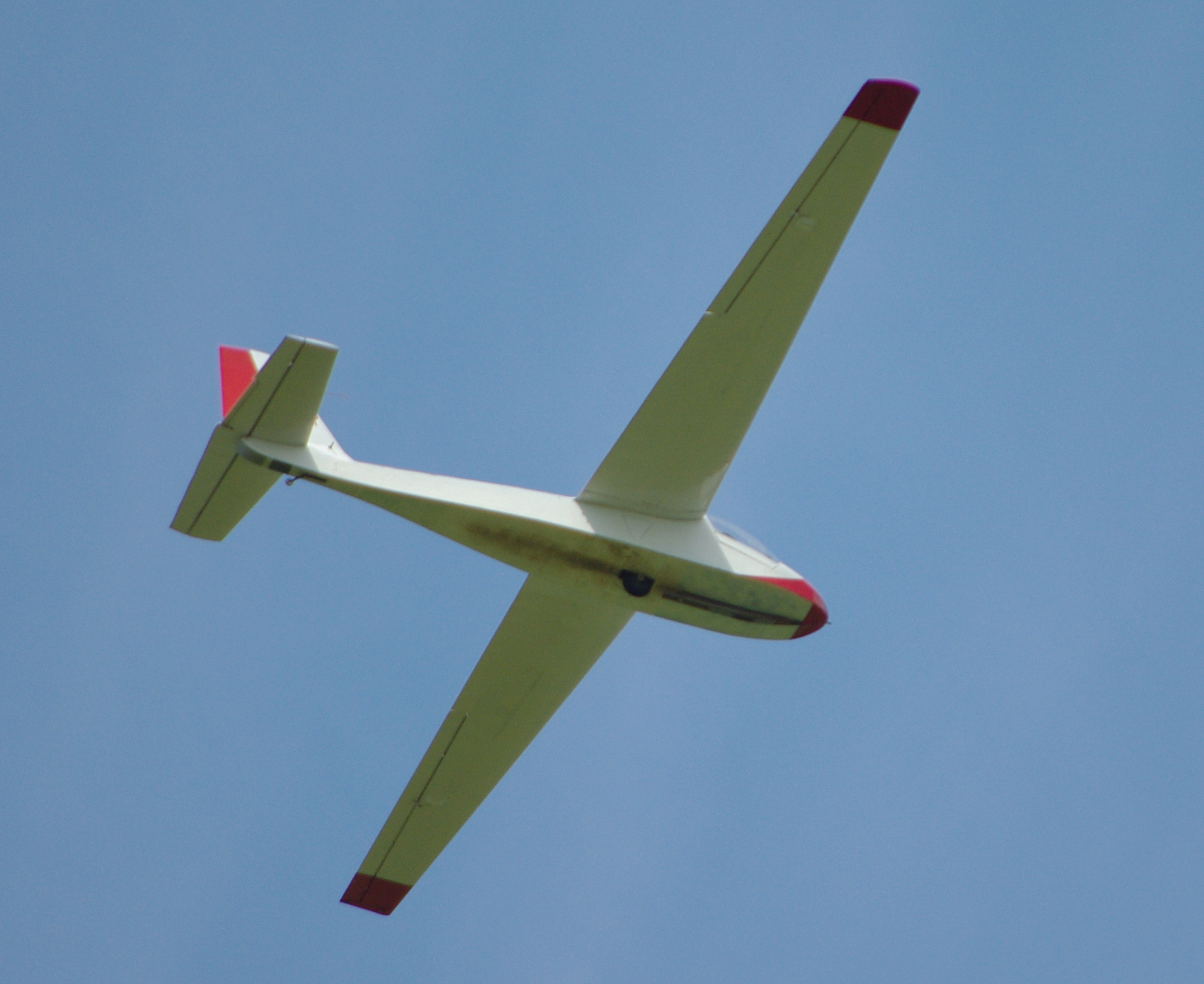
Capstan BUR/BGA1248 at the Vintage Glider Rally, Camphill, 2011

Capstan T49 Polar Curve, from manufacturer's Handbook

Data from The World's Sailplanes:Die Segelflugzeuge der Welt:Les Planeurs du Monde Volume II and Jane's All The World's Aircraft 1969

General characteristics

- Crew: 2
- Length: 25 ft 4 in (7.72 m)
- Wingspan: 55 ft 1 in (16.78 m)
- Wing area: 219.9 sq ft (20.43 m^{2})
- Aspect ratio: 13.75
- Airfoil: Root:NACA 63_{3}-620, Tip: NACA 6412
- Empty weight: 761 lb (345.4 kg)
- Gross weight: 1,250 lb (567 kg)

Performance

- Stall speed: 37 mph (60 km/h, 32 kn)
- Never exceed speed: 135 mph (217 km/h, 117 kn)
- Rough air speed max: 92 mph (148 km/h; 80 kn)
- Aerotow speed: 92 mph (148 km/h; 80 kn)
- Winch launch speed: 92 mph (148 km/h; 80 kn)
- g limits: +4, 0
- Maximum glide ratio: 30:1 at 47 mph (76 km/h; 41 kn)
- Rate of sink: 130 ft/min (0.66 m/s) at 43 mph (70 km/h; 38 kn)
- Wing loading: 5.7 lb/sq ft (27.7 kg/m^{2})

== See also ==
- List of gliders
