= Slingsby Eagle =

British two-seat glider, 1954

Slingsby Type 42 Eagle
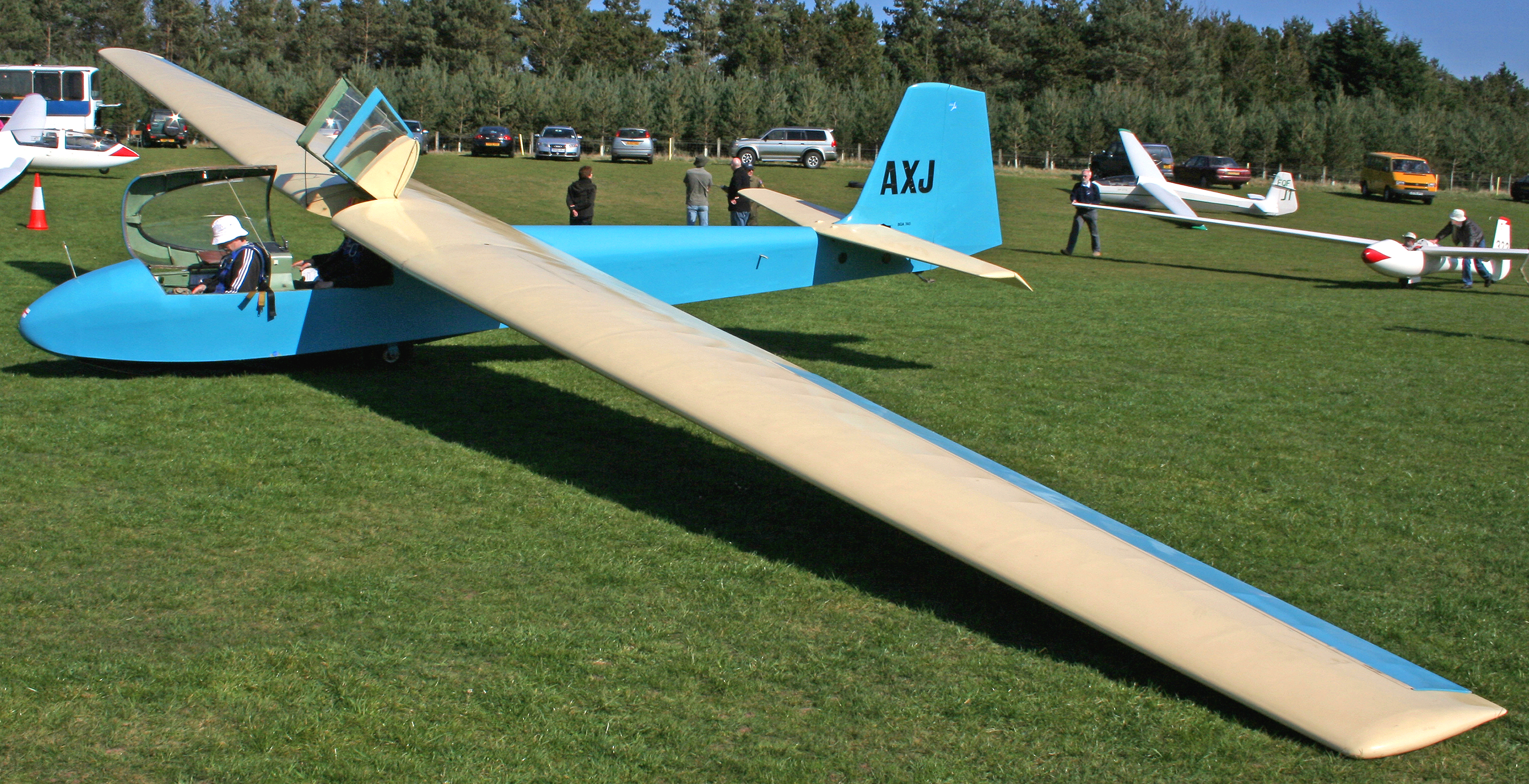

General information
- Type: High performance training Glider
- National origin: United Kingdom
- Manufacturer: Slingsby Sailplanes Ltd.
- Number built: 17

History
- First flight: 12 June 1954

The Slingsby Type 42 Eagle was a two-seat glider designed in England from 1952.

== Development ==
After the end of WWII the British Gliding Association (BGA) recognised a need for two-seat training gliders to replace the unsafe and inefficient solo training techniques that were prevalent at the time, launching a competition to design a two-seat trainer. Though Slingsby did not enter the competition it spurred them to look in the early 1950s at a two-seat version of their Type 34 Sky. The advent of the NACA laminar flow aerofoil sections at that time prompted them to start from scratch, designing a large aircraft with nearly 18 m span, three-part wings and a large fuselage with spacious, comfortable cockpits.

The fuselage is built up as a wooden truss with a plywood-covered stressed-skin top decking and wooden semi-monocoque forward fuselage. The cockpits are covered by two canopies, the forward one hinging to starboard and the rear hinged at the rear forming part of the leading edge, in the cut-outs provided for access to the rear seat.

The wings are built up from wood with plywood covering back to the rear spar inboard of the ailerons and forward of the mainspar outboard. A rectangular constant-thickness/chord ratio centre section sits atop the fuselage out to approximately 1/5 span each side where the tapering outer wings are fitted, with the leading edge unswept. Large, effective plate-type airbrakes are fitted, aft of the mainspar, to the wings at approximately 1/3 span extending out from upper and lower surfaces.

Plywood-skinned low-set tailplane and fin with fabric-covered built-up wooden elevators and rudder are at the tail end of the fuselage, the elevators fitted with trim tabs, one for longitudinal trim and one to compensate for pitch-up with operation of the airbrakes.

The undercarriage comprises a single mainwheel just aft of the loaded centre of gravity with a large nose skid faired in with leather or canvas and a metal tailskid.

== Variants ==
Ellison 1971, pp. 209–210

Slingsby Type 42 Eagle 1
The first prototype fitted with a 17.86 m swept-forward wing with cutouts in the root for access to the rear seat. The prototype suffered from poor performance traced to the leading edge cut-outs. This aircraft was destroyed after a mid-air collision with a Slingsby Type 34 Sky near Lasham, Hants on 14 June 1958.
Slingsby Type 42B Eagle 2
The second prototype introduced a simplified wing with no leading edge sweep-forward and the cutouts filled by the rear canopy. It won the two-seater class at the World Gliding Championships at Saint-Yan, France in 1956, piloted by Nicholas Goodhart and Frank Foster, coming second overall. This glider still flies at Devon & Somerset Gliding Club, [North Hill], England.
Slingsby Type 42B Eagle 3
Production aircraft fitted with a 17.7 m wing and cockpits moved forward; fifteen built.
Slingsby Type 55 Regal Eagle
A single Eagle 3 (c/n 1117 / BGA 821) fitted with a 20 m span wing in 1966–67, used to break the UK two-seat goal flight record with a flight from Odiham to Perranporth (312 km) piloted by Wally Kahn and John Williamson. This aircraft was destroyed in a fire at Doncaster in March 1975.

== Specifications (Eagle 3) ==
Data from The World's Sailplanes:Die Segelflugzeuge der Welt:Les Planeurs du Monde, and Bridgman 1956, p. 92, Flight (1957)

General characteristics

- Crew: 2
- Length: 27 ft 11 in (8.5 m)
- Wingspan: 58 ft 5 in (17.8 m)
- Height: 6 ft 0 in (1.83 m)
- Wing area: 229 sq ft (21.3 m^{2})
- Aspect ratio: 14.8
- Airfoil: root:NACA 63_{3}-618, tip:NACA 4412
- Empty weight: 820 lb (372 kg)
- Max takeoff weight: 1,239 lb (562 kg)

Performance

- Stall speed: 37 mph (60 km/h, 32 kn)
- Never exceed speed: 147 mph (237 km/h, 128 kn)
- Rough air speed max: 83 mph (134 km/h; 72 kn)
- Aerotow speed: 83 mph (134 km/h; 72 kn)
- Winch launch speed:83 mph (134 km/h; 72 kn)
- g limits: +7.5 - 3.8 at 71 mph (115 km/h; 62 kn)
- Maximum glide ratio: 31.5 at 52 mph (83 km/h; 45 kn)
- Rate of sink: 132 ft/min (0.67 m/s) at 44 mph (71 km/h; 38 kn)
- Wing loading: 5.4 lb/sq ft (26.4 kg/m^{2})

== See also ==
Related development

- Slingsby T.21
- Slingsby T.49 Capstan

Related lists

- List of gliders

== Notes and references ==
=== References ===
- Bridgman, Leonard (1956). Jane's All the World's Aircraft 1956-57. London: Jane's All the World's Aircraft Publishing Co. Ltd.
- Ellison, Norman (1971). British Gliders and Sailplanes. London: A & C Black ltd. ISBN 0-7136-1189-8.
- Shenstone, B.S.; K.G. Wilkinson; Peter Brooks (1958). The World's Sailplanes:Die Segelflugzeuge der Welt:Les Planeurs dans Le Monde (in English, French, and German) (1st ed.). Zurich: Organisation Scientifique et Technique Internationale du Vol a Voile (OSTIV) and Schweizer Aero-Revue. pp. 110–114.

=== Further reading ===
- Taylor, J. H. (ed) (1989) Jane's Encyclopedia of Aviation. Studio Editions: London. p. 29
