= 3-inch gun M1918 =

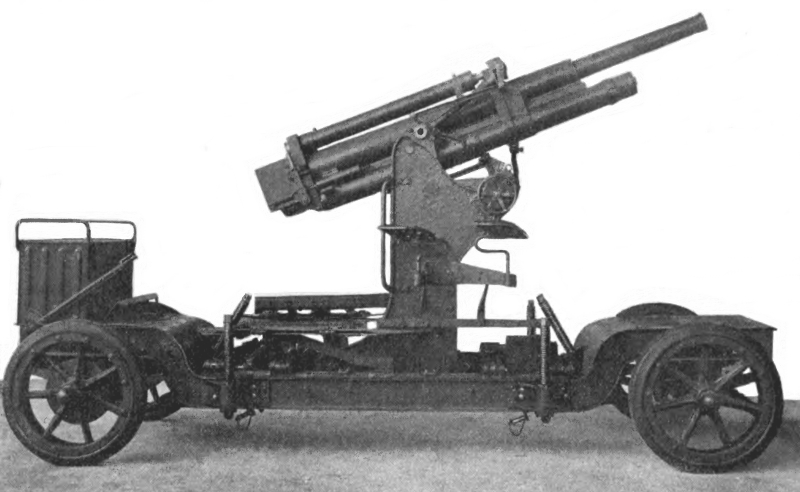
- 3-inch M1918 on towed trailer mount
- Type: Anti-aircraft gun
- Place of origin: United States

Service history
- Used by: United States Army

Specifications
- Mass: 12,200 lb (5,500 kg)
- Length: 24 ft 11 in (7.6 m)
- Barrel length: 12 ft 6 in (3.8 m) 40 calibers
- Width: 6 ft 11 in (2.1 m)
- Height: 9 ft 2 in (2.8 m)
- Shell: fixed 76.2 x 585mm R
- Shell weight: 15 lb (6.8 kg)
- Caliber: 3 in (76.2 mm)
- Breech: Semi-automatic vertical breech block
- Recoil: Hydro-pneumatic
- Carriage: 4 wheeled cruciform carriage
- Elevation: +10° to +85°
- Traverse: 360°
- Muzzle velocity: 2,400 ft/s (730 m/s)
- Maximum firing range: 25,800 ft (7.9 km) AA ceiling

The 3-inch gun M1918 was a United States 3-inch anti-aircraft gun that entered service in 1918 and served until it was largely superseded by the 3-inch anti-aircraft gun M3 in 1930, though the M1918 remained with some National Guard units until early in World War II. The M3 was subsequently replaced by the M1 90mm AA gun early in World War II, primarily during 1942. The M3 3" gun was later adapted for the anti-tank role, serving as the main armament of the M10 tank destroyer during World War II.

== The predecessor: 3-inch gun M1917 ==
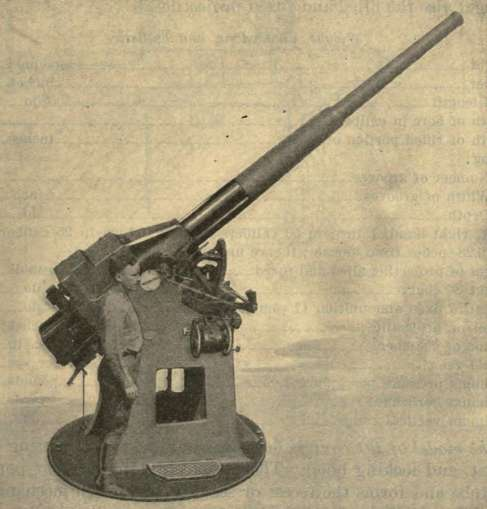
3-inch M1917

The 3-inch gun M1917 was the United States Army's first dedicated anti-aircraft gun, entering service during World War I. Only a few were built, as the similar 3-inch gun M1918 on a mobile mount was considered more useful and was produced in large numbers.

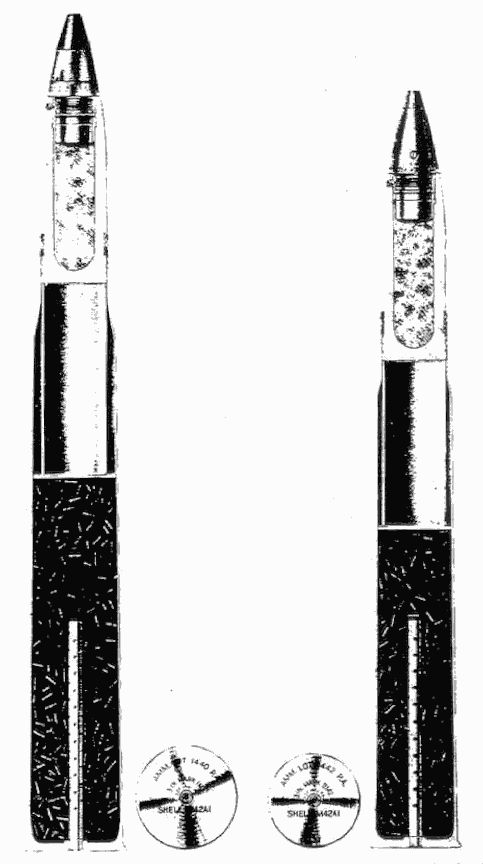
A comparison of HE rounds for M1917 (left) and M1918 guns from a 1944 manual (free space in cases reflects the improvement of the propellant)

Development of the M1917 started in 1915, and as the name implies, took two years to enter service. The gun was essentially an unmodified 3-inch M1903 (76.2 mm L/55) coastal-defense gun barrel on a new fixed mount allowing it to be aimed to high elevations. A number were used during World War I on fixed mountings; 116 were completed by April 1919. Most of the weapons were deployed at United States Army Coast Artillery Corps seacoast forts after World War I. In the immediate post-war era it was developed as the 3-inch M2, using a removable barrel liner. In 1928 it was further improved in the 3-inch M4 by using a thicker removable liner that eased manufacturing. However, the M2 and M4 appear to have been produced in small quantities. The M1917, M2, and M4 remained in service through World War II.

== History of the 3-inch M1918 ==
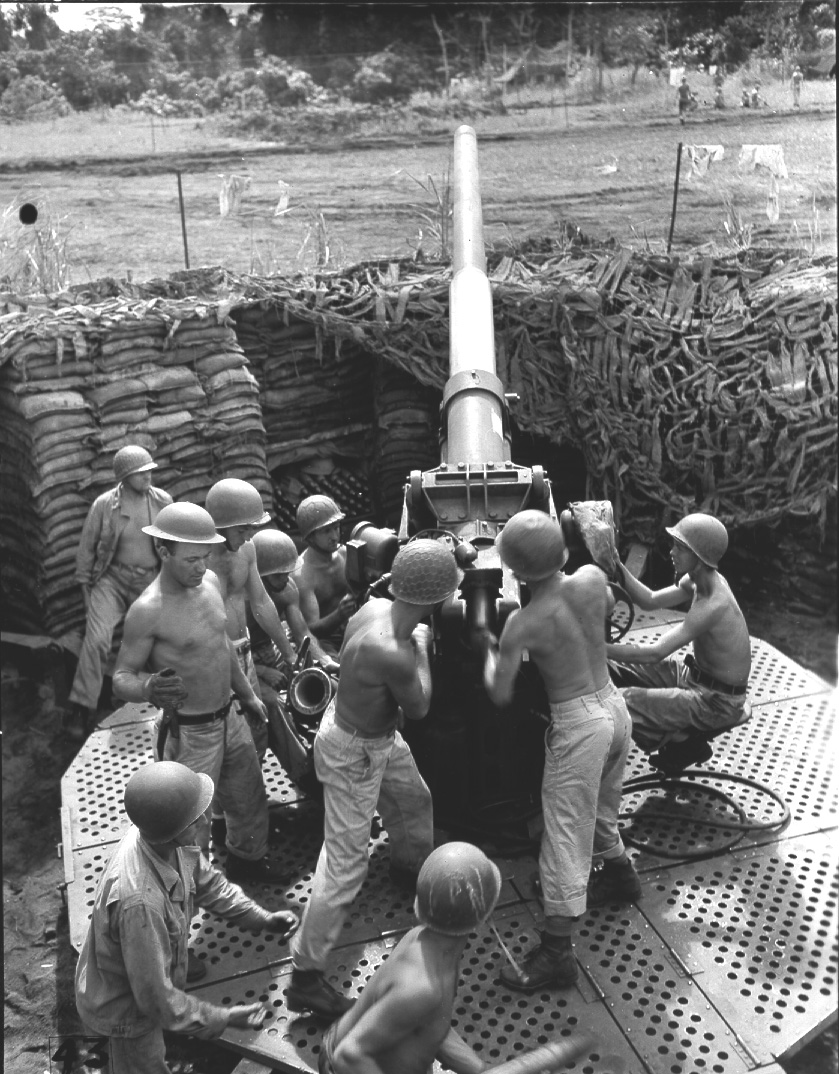
Gun crew man their 3-inch M3 at New Fighter Strip, Dobodura, New Guinea

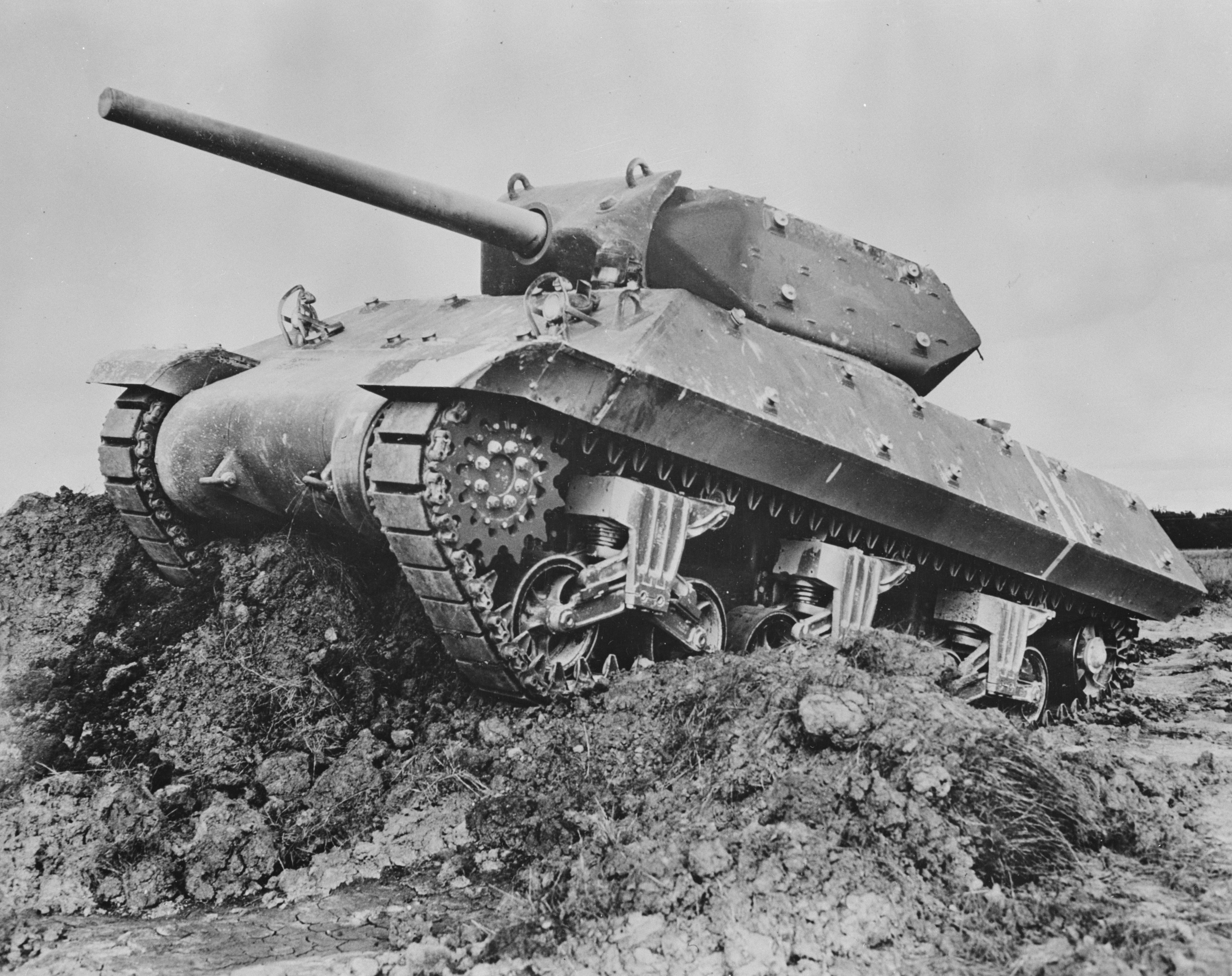
M10 tank destroyer, sporting the 3-inch M7

External images
- 3-inch M1917.
- 3-inch GMC T1/M5.
- 3-inch GMC T1/M5.
- 3-inch GMC T24.
- 3-inch GMC T40/M9.
- 3-inch GMC T56.
- 3-inch GMC T57.

For mobile use the original coastal gun was too heavy, so a smaller version was developed as the 3-inch M1918. This weapon was based on the Driggs-Seabury 3-inch gun M1898, a smaller predecessor of the M1903. This weapon had a barrel 50 calibers long instead of 55 calibers, and a smaller breech (200 cubic inches (3.3 L) instead of 296 cubic inches (4.85 L) with a different cartridge (reportedly 76.2x585R instead of 76.2x690R) featuring the maximal propelling charge decreased from |5.62 pounds (2.55 kg) to 4.94 pounds (2.24 kg). The barrel of the M1918 was shortened to 40 calibers and a semi-automatic breech was added. "Semi-automatic" on this type of weapon meant that the breech would open automatically after firing. Like the adaptations that created the M2 and M4, the M1918 was also fitted with a removable liner in 1927 and a barrel 50 calibers long, becoming the 3-inch M1; a year later the M3 weapon was introduced with a larger removable liner. Another upgrade was started in 1931 as the T8, and then T9, but these projects were cancelled in 1938 when the 90 mm gun M1 was selected in their place. The 3-inch gun M1918 remained in service, particularly in National Guard units, and saw action in early World War II.

In September 1940 a project started to adapt the 3-inch gun to the anti-tank role, starting with the T9 experimental model but equipping it with the breech, recoil system and carriage borrowed from the 105mm M2 howitzer. The gun was accepted for service as the 3-inch M5.

A similar derivative of the T9 – the 3-inch M6 – was intended to be mounted on the M5 self-propelled gun, which was eventually abandoned. A final adaptation was the 3-inch M7, which included minor modifications for mounting on the M6 heavy tank and M10 tank destroyer. M7 saw wide use although it was supplanted to some extent by more powerful weapons such as the 90mm M3 and the British QF 17 pounder. 6,824 M7 guns were manufactured.

== Variants ==
- 3-inch Gun M1917 – Original fixed-place anti-aircraft gun introduced in 1917, barrel based on 3-inch gun M1903.
- M1918 – Mobile anti-aircraft gun using a barrel based on the 3-inch gun M1898 and a new mount.
- M1 – Variant of the M1918 with a removable barrel liner.
- M2 – Variant of the M1917 with a removable barrel liner.
- M3 – Development of the M1918 with a removable barrel liner, but on a mobile mount.
- M4 – Version of the M2 with a thicker liner for easier manufacturing.
- M5 – Version of the T9 adapted for anti-tank use.
- M6 – Version of the T9 as mounted in the 3-inch M5 gun motor carriage.
- M7 – Version of the M5 for use on the M6 heavy tank and M10 tank destroyer

== Self-propelled mounts ==
- Heavy Tank M6 (M7 gun in mount T49).
- 3-inch Antiaircraft Gun Carriage T1 (Garford 7½ ton 6x4 truck chassis).
- 3-inch gun motor carriage T1 / M5 (high-speed tractor M2 chassis, M6 gun).
- 3-inch gun motor carriage T7 (trackless tank chassis).
- 3-inch gun motor carriage T15 (Ford 4x4 / 6x6 truck chassis).
- 3-inch gun motor carriage T20 (light tank M3 chassis).
- 3-inch gun motor carriage T24 (medium tank M3 chassis, M3 gun).
- 3-inch gun motor carriage T35 / M10 (M4 Sherman chassis, M7 gun in mount M5).
- 3-inch gun motor carriage T40/M9 (medium tank M3 chassis, M1918 gun).
- 3-inch gun motor carriage T50.
- 3-inch gun motor carriage T55.
- 3-inch gun motor carriage T56, T57 (light tank M3A3 chassis, M7 gun).

== Surviving examples ==
The only known surviving example is located at the Fort Sill, Oklahoma, museum.

== See also ==
- List of anti-aircraft guns
- G-numbers
- 3-inch/23-caliber gun – US Navy AA gun
- 3-inch/50-caliber gun – US Navy dual-purpose gun
- United States home front during World War I

=== Weapons of comparable role, performance and era ===
- British QF 3-inch 20 cwt
- Japanese Type 88 75 mm AA gun
- Soviet 76 mm air defense gun M1931
