= M10 tank destroyer =

WW2 American tank destroyer

3-inch gun motor carriage M10
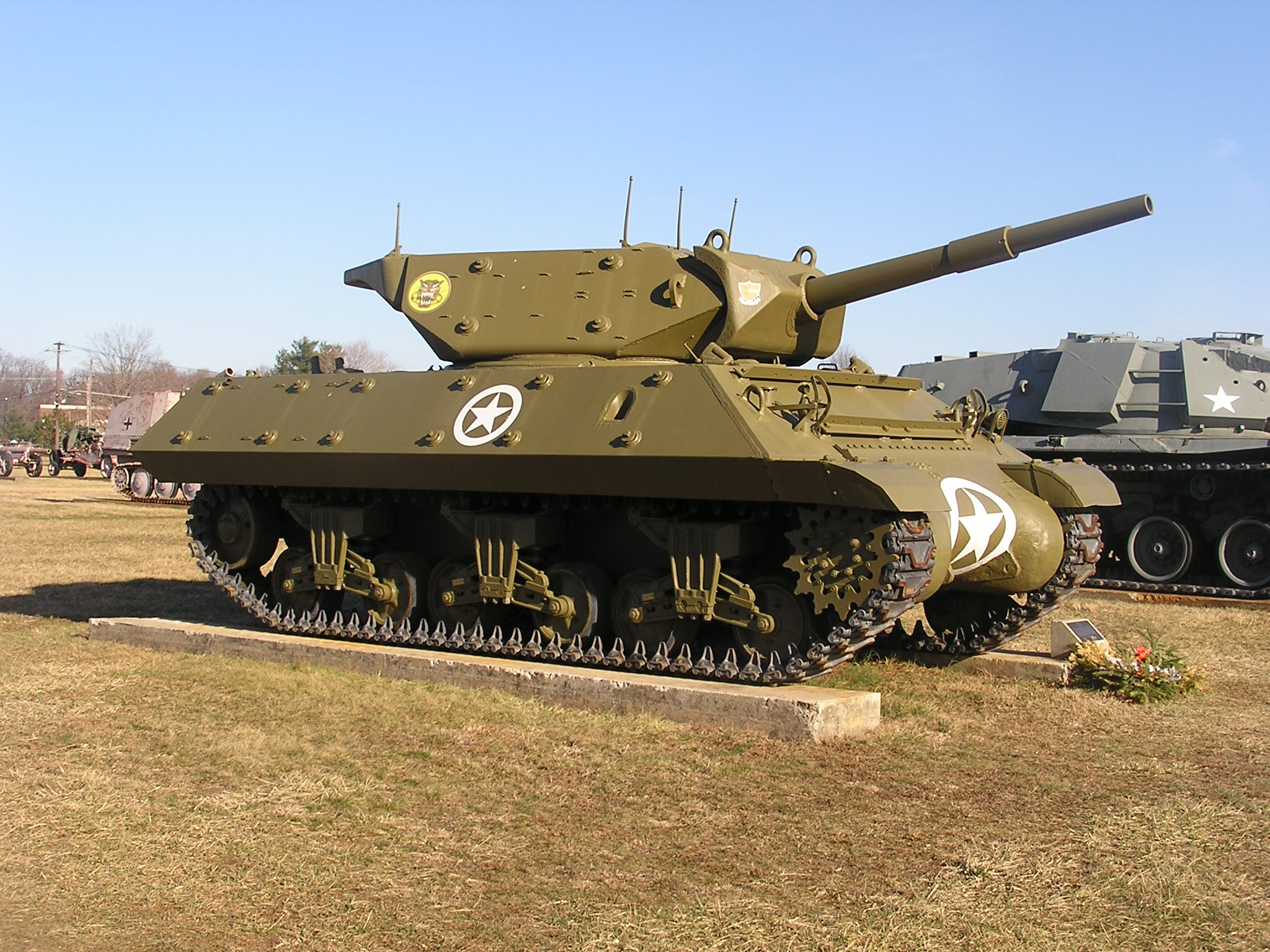
- An M10 at Aberdeen Proving Ground.
- Type: Self-propelled anti-tank gun
- Place of origin: United States

Service history
- Wars: World War II; 1948 Arab–Israeli War; Suez Canal Crisis

Production history
- Designer: U.S. Army Ordnance Department
- Designed: 1942
- Manufacturer: Fisher Body division of General Motors; Ford Motor Company
- Unit cost: US$47,900 (equivalent to $943,854 in 2025)
- Produced: M10: September 1942 – December 1943; M10A1: October 1942 – November 1943
- No. built: 6,406
- Variants: see Variants

Specifications (3-inch Gun Motor Carriage M10/M10A1)
- Mass: M10 – 65,200 lb (29.1 long tons; 29.6 t); M10A1 – 64,000 lb (29 long tons; 29 t)
- Length: 19 ft 7 in (5.97 m) hull; 22 ft 5 in (6.83 m) including gun
- Width: 10 ft 0 in (3.05 m)
- Height: 9 ft 6 in (2.90 m) over antiaircraft machine gun
- Crew: 5 (Commander, gunner, loader, driver, assistant driver)
- Armor: 0.375 to 2.25 in (9.5 to 57.2 mm)
- Main armament: 3-inch gun M7 (76.2 mm) in Mount M5; 54 rounds
- Secondary armament: .50 caliber (12.7 mm) Browning M2HB machine gun 300 rounds
- Engine: M10 – General Motors 6046 twin diesel; *375 hp (280 kW) at 2,100 rpm; M10A1 – Ford GAA V8; *450 hp (340 kW) at 2,600 rpm
- Power/weight: M10 – 12.68 hp (9.46 kW)/metric ton; M10A1 – 15.50 hp (11.56 kW)/metric ton
- Transmission: Synchromesh, 5 speeds forward, 1 reverse
- Suspension: Vertical volute spring suspension (VVSS)
- Fuel capacity: M10 – 165 US gal (620 L); M10A1 – 192 US gal (730 L)
- Operational range: M10 – 200 mi (320 km); M10A1 – 160 mi (260 km)
- Maximum speed: M10 – 25–30 mi (40–48 km)/h on road; M10A1 – 30 mi (48 km)/h on road

The M10 tank destroyer, formally known as the 3-inch gun motor carriage M10 or M10 GMC, was an American tank destroyer of World War II. After US entry into World War II and the formation of the Tank Destroyer Force, a suitable vehicle was needed to equip the new battalions. By November 1941, the Army requested a vehicle with a gun in a fully rotating turret after other interim models were criticized for being too poorly designed. The prototype of the M10 was conceived in early 1942 and delivered in April that year. After appropriate changes to the hull and turret were made, the modified version was selected for production in June 1942 as the "3-inch Gun Motor Carriage M10". It mounted the 3-inch (76.2 mm) gun M7 in a rotating turret on a modified M4 Sherman tank chassis.

It was built in two variants. The M10 GMC used the M4A2 Sherman chassis, and the M10A1 used the M4A3 chassis. Production of the two models ran from September 1942 to December 1943 and October 1942 to November 1943, respectively.

The M10 was numerically the most important U.S. tank destroyer of World War II. It combined thin but sloped armor with the M4's reliable drivetrain and a reasonably potent anti-tank gun mounted in an open-topped turret. Despite its obsolescence in the face of newer German tanks like the Panther medium tank and the introduction of more powerful and better-designed types as replacements, the M10 remained in service until the end of the war. During World War II, the primary user of the M10 tank destroyer was the United States, but many were supplied under Lend-Lease to the United Kingdom, Canada and Free French forces. Several dozen were also sent to the Soviet Union. Post-war, the M10 was given as military surplus to several countries, such as Belgium, Denmark, and the Netherlands, through the Mutual Defense Assistance Act or acquired through other means by countries like Israel and the Republic of China.

The M10 is often referred to by the nickname "Wolverine", an unofficial name that sometimes appeared in wartime Chrysler advertising, but that was not used by U.S. troops; the M10 was never officially assigned a nickname or referred to with one when used by American soldiers, who simply called it a "TD" (a nickname for any tank destroyer in general) beyond its formal designation.

== Doctrine ==
U.S. combined arms doctrine on the eve of World War II held that tanks should be designed to fulfill the role of forcing a breakthrough into enemy rear areas. Separate GHQ (General Headquarters) tank battalions would support infantry in destroying fixed enemy defenses, and armored divisions would then exploit the breakthrough to rush into the enemy's vulnerable rear areas. U.S. tanks were expected to fight any hostile tanks they encountered in their attack, but the mission of destroying massed enemy armored thrusts was assigned to a new branch, the Tank Destroyer Force developed in 1941. Tank destroyer units were meant to counter German blitzkrieg tactics. Rather than rely on a "thin cordon" of anti-tank guns which would be defeated by a concentrated attack, the tank destroyer units were to be held as a reserve behind the battleline (at the corps or army level), and were to move quickly to the site of any massed enemy tank breakthrough. They would maneuver aggressively and using ambush tactics to destroy enemy tanks; charging or chasing enemy tanks was explicitly prohibited. This led to a requirement for very fast, well-armed vehicles. Though equipped with turrets (unlike most self-propelled anti-tank guns of the day), the typical American design was more heavily gunned, but more lightly armored, and thus more maneuverable, than a contemporary tank. The idea was to use speed and agility as a defense, rather than thick armor, to bring a powerful self-propelled gun into action against enemy tanks. Or more precisely, to use speed to deploy ahead of the attacking enemy, take up camouflaged and protected firing positions on their flanks if possible, and then open fire. If unable to destroy the enemy force or to force them to retreat, then mobility would be used to avoid enemy fire until the TDs could withdraw, preferably to move up and deploy for another ambush. Direct combat in the open against tanks was to be avoided whenever possible.

== Development ==
After the formation of the Tank Destroyer Tactical and Firing Center at Camp Hood, Texas in November 1941, the Army began testing to standardize on a configuration for the new tank destroyer battalions. The Tank Destroyer board began to examine several hundred Ordnance Department prototype proposals for a tank destroyer mounting a 3-inch gun, initially focusing the most interest on two:

- The T1, developed beginning in 1940 and standardized as the "M5 3-inch Gun Motor Carriage" in January 1941. It was a modified Cleveland Tractor Company airfield towing tractor mounting a development of the 3-inch gun M1918 anti-aircraft gun in a limited-traverse mounting. (Note: The M5 was criticized as being too hastily designed and was rendered obsolete by the Army's request for a turreted tank destroyer. It was cancelled on 30 September 1942.)
- T24, developed beginning in October 1941. It was an M3 Lee chassis mounting a 3-inch gun M1918 in a limited-traverse mounting. The T24 was initially rejected as being too tall and the T40 was its improved derivative. The T40 was standardized as the "M9 3-inch Gun Motor Carriage" for limited production in May 1942 but never built. (Note: The M9 was also criticized and performed very poorly during trials, breaking a track and later catching fire. It was cancelled on 28 August 1942, when it was realized that there were only 28 M1918 guns available to use for production vehicles.)

Meanwhile, as the final design developments of these two tank destroyers were underway, the Ordnance Department became dissatisfied and in November 1941 issued an additional specification for a tank destroyer with a 3-inch gun in a rotating turret. Design work began immediately. The 3-inch Gun Motor Carriage T35 combined an early-production M4A2 medium tank hull with the 3-inch gun M7 (also derived from the M1918 gun) from the M6 Heavy Tank in a cast, circular, open-topped turret. Using lessons learned from combat reports from the Philippines, the armor on the sides and rear of the upper hull was changed from flat to sloped plates. This new test vehicle was designated the 3-inch Gun Motor Carriage T35E1. Prototypes of these two vehicles were delivered to Aberdeen Proving Ground in April 1942, and the Army selected the T35E1 for further development on 2 May 1942. The side and rear upper hull armor of the T35E1 was reduced from 1 inch (25 mm) to 0.75 inches (19 mm) in order to reduce the weight of the vehicle. The staff at Aberdeen Proving Ground was worried that the armor of the T35E1 was too thin, and so bosses for appliqué armor panels were added to the hull sides, glacis, and turret sides. As the cast turret was found to be difficult to manufacture, the design of the turret was changed to a sloped pentagonal shape made of welded armor plate. In June 1942, the modified T35E1 was standardized as the 3-inch Gun Motor Carriage M10. By fall 1943, with its M5 and M9 competitors being eliminated from the design competition and their production contracts cancelled, the M10 was to become the United States' primary tank destroyer of the early war period.

As there were fears that the production of M4A2 chassis would be inadequate for M10 production, an alternate design, the 3-inch Gun Motor Carriage M10A1 based on the M4A3 medium tank chassis, was also authorized for production.

== Design ==
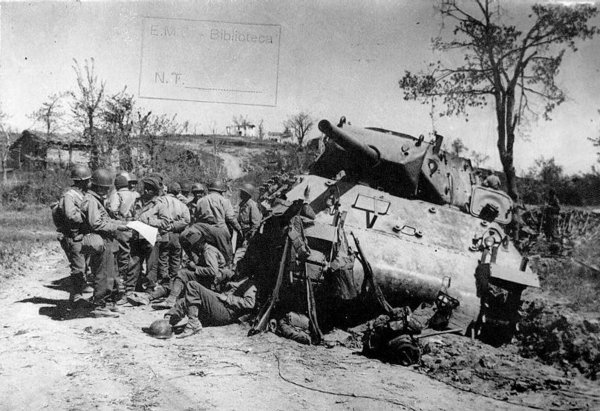
Brazilian infantry resting beside a US M10 in Italy, April 1945.

American tank destroyer doctrine emphasized speed and gun power over armor. As a result, the M10's armor was thin, which made it vulnerable to most German anti-tank weapons. The thickness of the M10's armor ranged from 3/8 to 2 1/4 in (10 to 57 mm). The lower hull, being modified from that of a standard M4A2 or M4A3 Sherman tank, had 1-inch-thick (25 mm) armor on the sides and rear, and a 1/2-inch-thick (13 mm) floor. The rounded, cast transmission cover was 2 inches (51 mm) thick. In a departure from its M4 Sherman parent, the M10 lacked the extra 1/2-inch floor plate under the driver's and assistant driver's stations that provided them additional protection from mines.

The glacis plate was 1 1/2 inches (38 mm) thick, sloped at 55 degrees from the vertical. The sides and rear of the upper hull were 3/4 inch (19 mm) thick, sloped at 38 degrees from the vertical. The rear upper hull plate was used for storage of the vehicle's pioneer and maintenance tools: a 5-pound (2.3 kg) axe, a 5-foot (1.5 m) crowbar, a mattock handle and head, a double-sided 10-pound (4.5 kg) sledgehammer, and a track tensioning wrench. The sides and rear of the upper hull featured angled extensions or covers over the upper run of track. These extensions often got in the way of fitting "duckbill" extended end connectors, used to reduce ground pressure on soft ground, and were often removed, along with the front fenders, by maintenance units. The hull roof plate ranged from 3/4 inch (19 mm) thick over the driver's and assistant driver's stations and turret ring, to 3/8 inch (9.5 mm) thick over the engine compartment.

The manually rotated turret of the M10 was a pentagonal shape. The sides were sloped 15 degrees inward from the vertical and were 1 inch (25 mm) thick. The rear of the turret was also 1 inch thick. The partial roof on the front third of the turret opening was 3/4 inch (19 mm) thick. The triangular cast gun shield sported the thickest armor on the vehicle, 2 1/4 inches (57 mm). It was sloped at 45 degrees from the vertical and horizontal.

The M10 and M10A1 were mechanically identical except for their power plants. The M10 used the General Motors 6046, a twin engine formed from two Detroit Diesel 6-71 inline engines mated to a single output. The tandem engine produced 375 horsepower (280 kW) at 2,100 rpm. One advantage of the GM 6046 was that the engines could be disconnected at will from the output and run independently. If one of the engines was damaged or destroyed, it could be disconnected and the other engine used to move the vehicle. The engine of the M10A1 was the Ford GAA, an 8-cylinder derivative of an ill-fated V-12 aircraft engine project. It produced 450 horsepower (340 kW) at 2,600 rpm. When tested side by side in September 1943, the M10A1 was judged to have superior automotive performance to the M10. Even though it produced only slightly less torque, the M10A1's engine was far lighter, and used a common fuel like the rest of the Army's vehicles (gasoline). By the time the test results were released in February 1944, the Army was committed to using the M10 overseas. As a result, the M10A1 was kept in the United States for training.

The M10 and M10A1 had a crew of five; commander, gunner, loader, driver, and assistant driver. The driver and assistant driver (who also operated the vehicle's radio) were seated in the front hull and provided with periscopes. The unique design of the hull hatches to clear the gun mantlet meant that the driver's view directly to the left side was obstructed. He was provided with a second periscope at the edge of the hull for this purpose. The commander, gunner, and loader were all located in the turret. The commander sat on a folding seat at the right rear. The gunner, on the left side of the gun, normally stood to operate it, but he was also provided with a folding seat. The loader normally stood in the area behind the gun. A third folding seat was provided in the turret for the assistant driver in case he needed to assist the loader for any reason.

Unlike the M4 tanks it was based upon, the M10 lacked an auxiliary generator, which forced the crew to run the main engines in order to recharge the vehicle's batteries. The engine noise and smoke could attract enemy fire, especially in close quarters, where the M10 was vulnerable due to its thin armor and open-topped turret. The lack of an auxiliary generator was rectified with the introduction of the M36 tank destroyer.

== Production ==
Production of M10 and M10A1
| Month | M10 | M10A1 |
|---|---|---|
| September 1942 | 105 | |
| October 1942 | 170 | 3 |
| November 1942 | 137 | 18 |
| December 1942 | 199 | 7 |
| January 1943 | 276 | 56 |
| February 1943 | 340 | 116 |
| March 1943 | 330 | 150 |
| April 1943 | 428 | 133 |
| May 1943 | 416 | 123 |
| June 1943 | 400 | 133 |
| July 1943 | 402 | 124 |
| August 1943 | 465 | 131 |
| September 1943 | 498 | 49 |
| October 1943 | 350 | 150 |
| November 1943 | 237 | 220 |
| December 1943 | 240 | |
| January 1944 | | 300 hulls |
| Total | 4,993 | 1,413 + 300 hulls |

Soon after reaching production, it was realized that the barrel of the 3-inch gun M7 was too heavy, to the point where it prevented traverse of the turret on a slope of more than four degrees. As an attempt to improve the figure to fifteen degrees, the Army ordered that the track grousers and antiaircraft machine gun be stored on the rear of the turret. This did not solve the balance problem, and on 21 December 1942, triangular "quick fix" turret counterweights made of lead, mild steel, or cast iron were authorized. The mild steel parts weighed 2,400 pounds. Meanwhile, a set of wedge-shaped counterweights weighing 3,700 pounds total was designed by Fisher. The wedge-shaped weights began to be added to new vehicles at Fisher on 25 January 1943. By late December 1942, a second lock was added to the turret and a stirrup-shaped gun cradle was added to the rear deck to secure the gun for travel.

Since the track grousers could not be stored on the rear of the turret anymore, grouser racks that could be attached to the appliqué armor bosses on the hull were added to vehicles beginning in early April 1943. The M10 initially lacked any provision for indirect fire. In May 1943, an azimuth indicator and gunner's quadrant were added to the M10. The grouser racks and indirect fire equipment were often retrofitted to earlier vehicles. By late June 1943, it was realized that Fisher's initial counterweights were too heavy. Two newly designed counterweights reduced the total weight to 2,500 pounds and better distributed the weight of the gun. They resembled an upside-down "duck bill" shape when viewed from the side. To accommodate the new weights, the design of the upper rear of the turret was changed from sloped inwards to nearly vertical. In July 1943, the appliqué armor bosses on the hull sides and turret were dropped from production. The bosses on the glacis were retained. In late September 1943, a single M10 was tested with an Oilgear hydraulic traversing motor that could traverse the turret even without the counterweights, but this modification was not pursued as the production contracts were reaching their end.

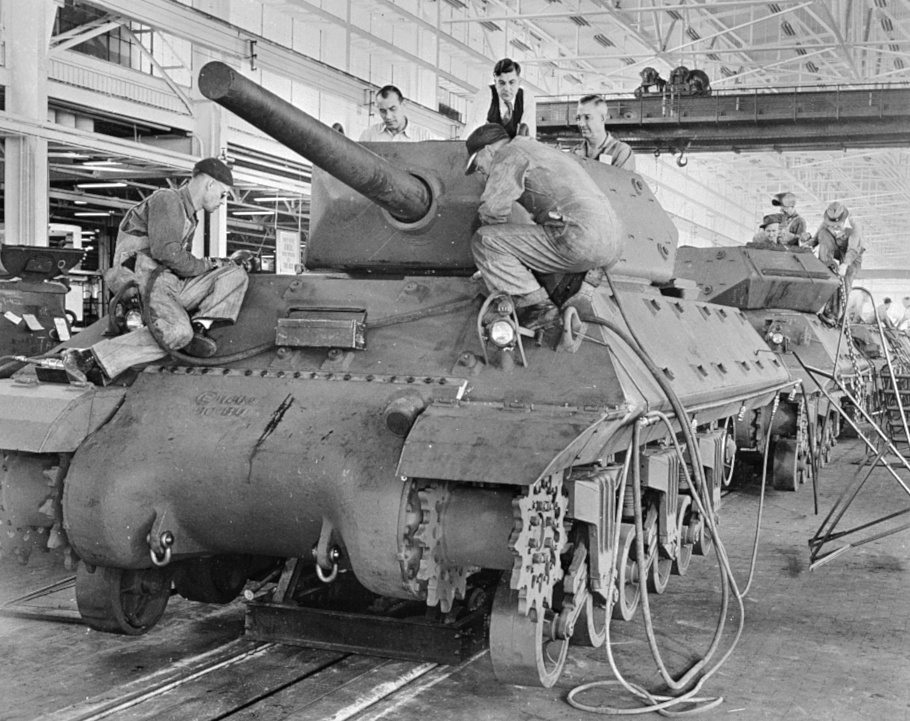
M10 shown in mass production at General Motors tank arsenal.

Production of 4,993 M10s by the Fisher Body division of General Motors at the Fisher Tank Arsenal in Grand Blanc, Michigan ran from September 1942 through December 1943. Ford Motor Company built 1,038 M10A1s from October 1942 until September 1943. From September to November 1943, Fisher built the remaining 375 M10A1s. Fisher also completed a further 300 M10A1 hulls without turrets in January 1944 for direct conversion to M36 tank destroyers. From January to June 1944, 209 M10A1 vehicles were subsequently converted to M35 Prime Movers by removing the turret and adding the necessary equipment for them to tow the 8-inch Gun M1 and 240 mm Howitzer M1

1,413 M10A1s, including the 300 hulls manufactured in January 1944, and 724 M10s were eventually converted into M36 tank destroyers.

Production of M10 and M10A1
| Model | Quantity | Contract | Serial numbers | Registration numbers |
|---|---|---|---|---|
| M10 | 1,800 | 374-ORD-1880 | 3 through 1802 | 4040705 through 4042504 |
| M10A1 | 1,038 | 374-ORD-1213 | 1803 through 2840 | 4046509 through 4047546 |
| M10 | 1,200 | 374-ORD-1880 | 2841 through 4040 | 4081054 through 4082253 |
| M10 | 1,117 | 374-ORD-1880 | 5991 through 7107 | 40110110 through 40111226 |
| M10 | 876 | T-7581 | 7108 through 7983 | Unknown |
| M10A1 | 375 | 374-ORD-1213 | 7984 through 8358 | 40112380 through 40112754 |

== Armament ==
=== Primary ===
The M10 tank destroyer had an open-topped manually traversed turret mounting the 3-inch gun M7 in the M5 mount. The gunner stood or sat on the left side of the gun, and aimed it using the M51 or M70G telescope. An M12A4 panoramic telescope was also provided on the right side of the turret for indirect fire use. The M10 carried 54 rounds of 3-inch ammunition, 48 of which were stowed in four racks in the sponsons, and 6 rounds in the upper rear of the turret. For combat use, the 3-inch Gun M7 could fire five types of ammunition:

- M79 AP-T shot
- M62/M62A1 APCBC/HE-T shell
- M42A1 high explosive shell
- M88 HC B1 (hexachloroethane smoke) shell
- T4 (M93) HVAP-T shot

The M79 AP shot could penetrate 92 mm of homogeneous armor angled at 30 degrees from the vertical at 1,000 yards. The M62 APCBC/HE-T shell was capable of penetrating 88 mm of homogeneous armor under the same conditions The T4 (later M93) HVAP shot was rare and was used in small numbers beginning in September 1944. It could penetrate 135 mm of homogeneous armor at 30 degrees and 1,000 yards. This shot featured a sub-caliber tungsten carbide penetrator encased within a steel jacket and aluminum body and ballistic "windshield". By March 1945, about 18,000 rounds of this special ammunition had been delivered to the European Theater, 58 percent of which were 3-inch projectiles. The M42A1 high explosive shell was used for indirect artillery fire or against fortifications and soft targets like infantry in trenches or antitank guns. The M88 hexachloroethane smoke shell was used to create smoke screens, or to flush enemy infantry out of buildings or fortified positions.

A .50 caliber (12.7 mm) Browning M2HB heavy machine gun could be mounted on the top rear of the turret for use against enemy infantry and for anti-aircraft use. The ammunition (300 rounds in 50-round boxes) was stowed under the vehicle subfloor. The crew had personal weapons for self-defense. A Thompson submachine gun with 460 rounds of ammunition was stowed on brackets in the right rear of the turret for use by the vehicle commander. The other four crew members were armed with M1 carbines, each carrying as much ammunition on their person as they saw fit. An M1903 Springfield rifle with 60 rounds of ammunition was stowed next to the assistant driver, and an adapter for the rifle and ten M9 rifle grenades for use against tanks were stowed under the left front vehicle subfloor. Storage boxes in the turret held five Mk 2 grenade, five M18 smoke grenade, and two thermite grenades.

== Combat use ==
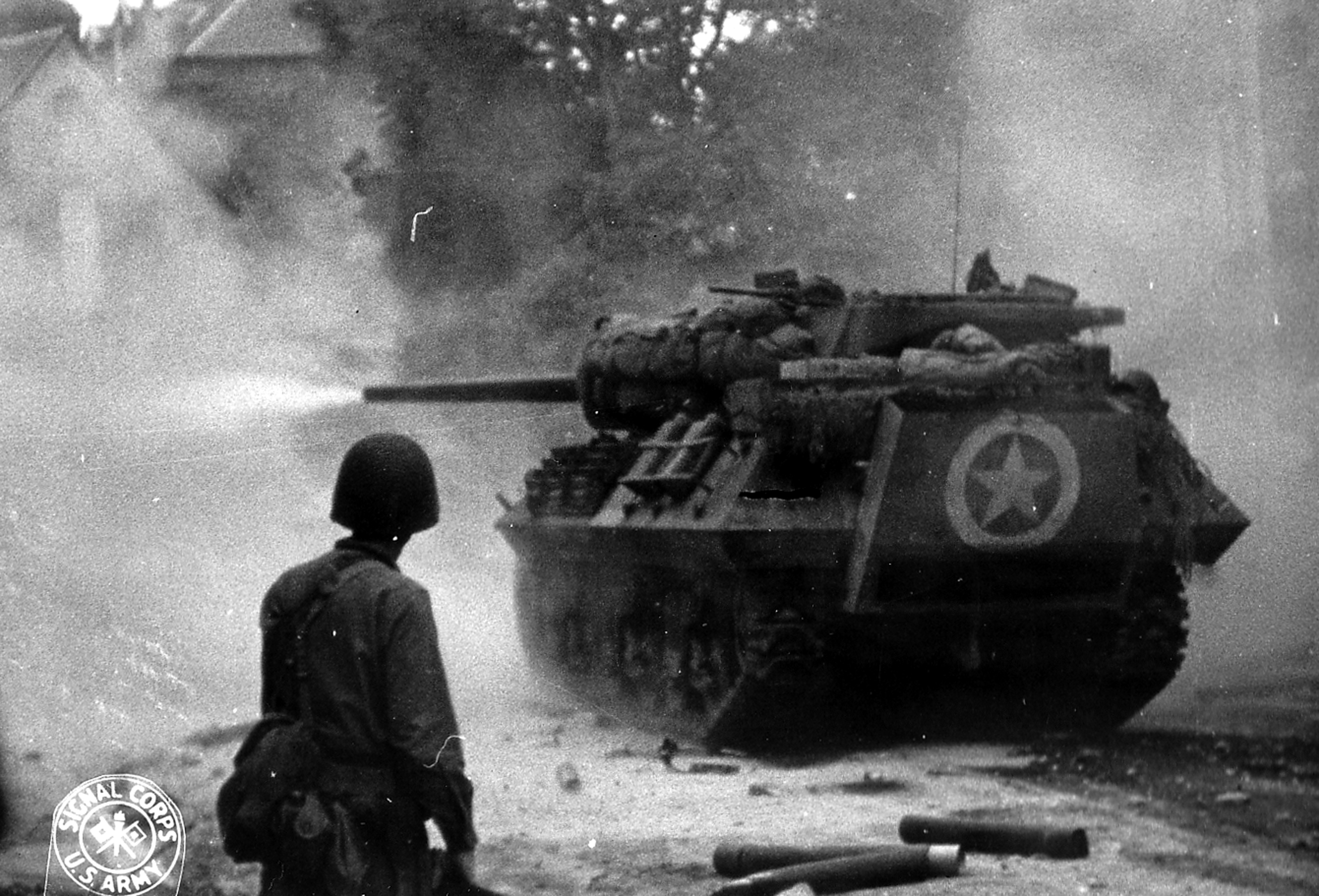
M10 in action near Saint-Lô, June 1944.

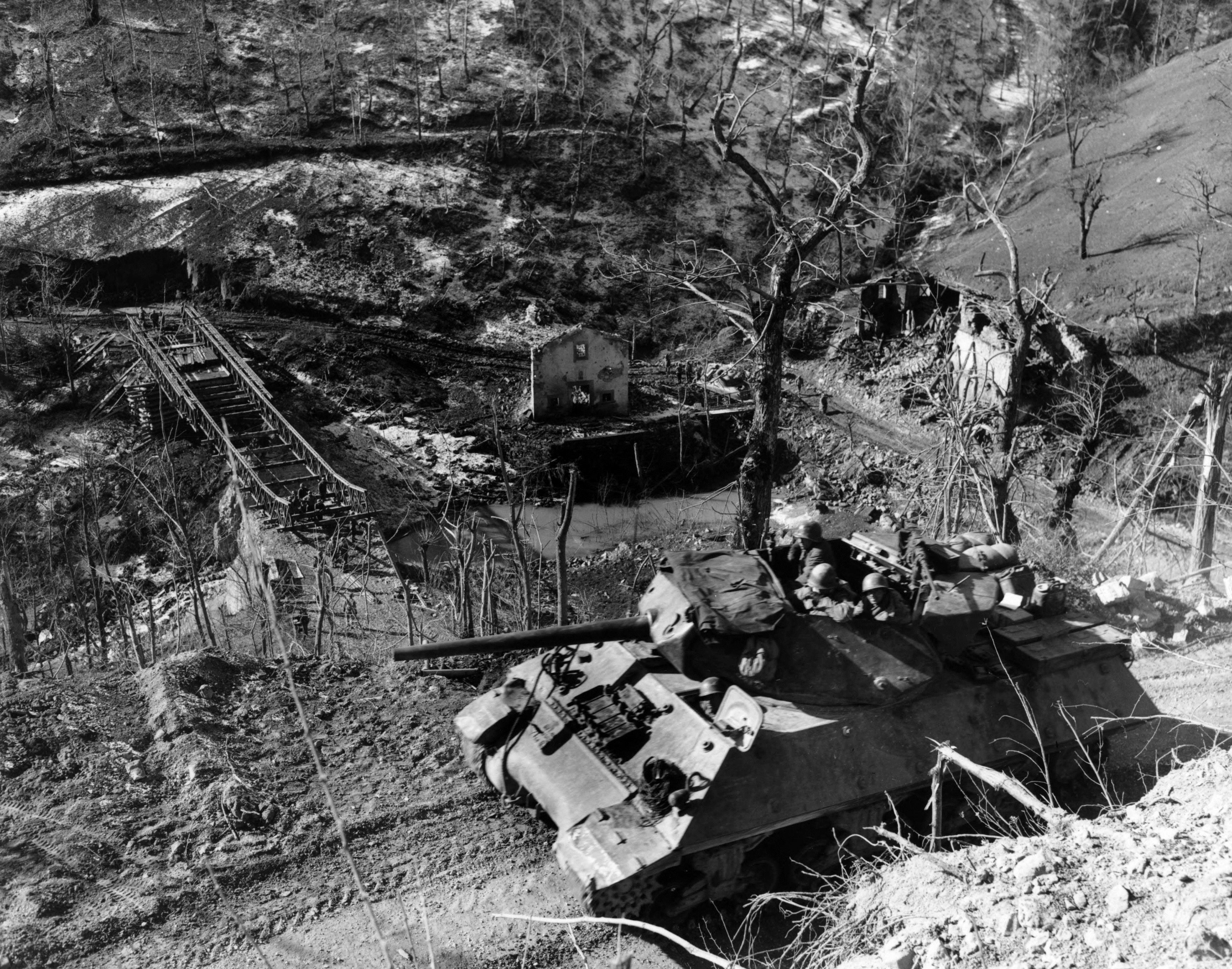
M10 of the 701st Tank Destroyer Battalion advances along a mountain road in Italy, 3 March 1945.

=== United States Army ===
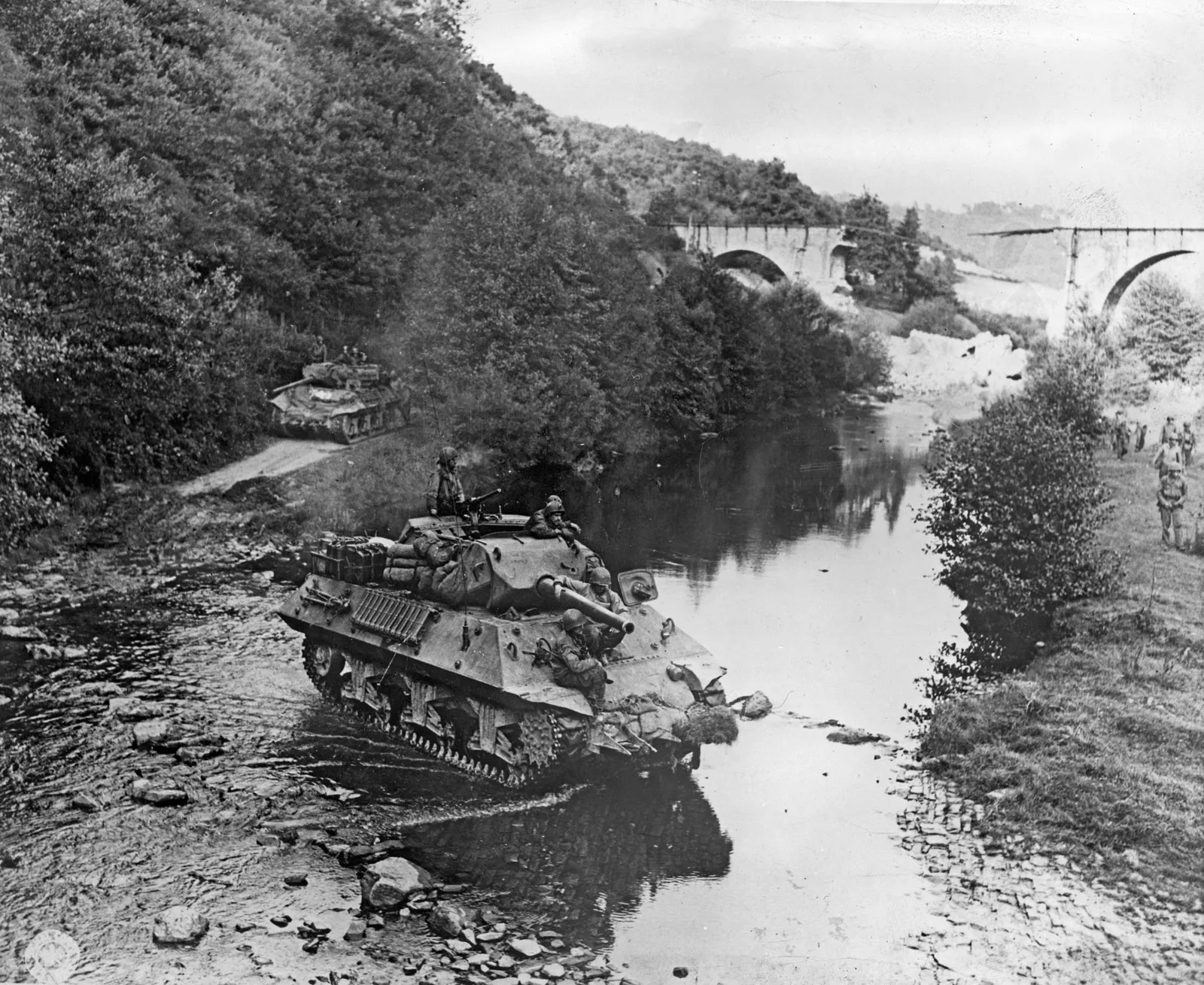
Two American M10 tank destroyers in Belgium during World War II.

The M10's heavy chassis did not conform to the quickly evolving tank destroyer doctrine of employing very light high-speed vehicles, and starting in the summer of 1944 it began to be supplemented by the fast M18 Hellcat. American tank destroyer doctrine called for tank destroyers to be kept in reserve and rushed forward to counter massed enemy armored attacks. In reality, this was not the case and M10 battalions were attached, often semi-permanently, to infantry and armored divisions to provide additional direct and indirect fire support. Typical missions included providing indirect artillery fire by augmenting divisional artillery units, following and supporting the lead elements of an infantry assault, attacking obstacles such as fortifications and enemy vehicles (including tanks) that hampered the advance of friendly units, and setting up an antitank defense once the objective was secured.

The combat debut of the M10 came on 23 March 1943, during the Battle of El Guettar, in the Tunisian campaign part of the larger North African campaign. The M10 was initially successful as its M7 3-inch gun could destroy most German tanks then in service. During the battle, M10s of the 899th Tank Destroyer Battalion and M3 Gun Motor Carriages of the 601st Tank Destroyer Battalion destroyed 30 German tanks, although 20 M3s and 7 M10s were lost. The M10 did not see much anti-tank action for the rest of the North African campaign, and instead was used as mobile fire support.

During tank fighting in the Normandy campaign, the M10's 3-inch gun was proven to be ineffective against the thick frontal armor of the German Panther medium tank. On 6 July 1944, Eisenhower's headquarters requested that all M10 battalions be converted to the new M36 as soon as possible. On 10 July 1944, the 899th Tank Destroyer Battalion blunted a German counterattack by the Panzer Lehr Division near Le Dézert and destroyed 12 Panthers, one Panzer IV, and one Sturmgeschütz III assault gun in a fierce two-day battle, most of it taking place at ranges of less than 200 m (220 yd). Due to the initial shock of encountering heavy German tanks, further changes were made in the tank destroyer force in late September 1944. American officials requested that of the 52 battalions then committed to the European theater, 20 be converted to the M36, 20 retain the M10 or M18 at the discretion of their commanders, and the 12 towed battalions be re-equipped with the (prototype) T5 90 mm towed gun. By October 1944, the improved 90 mm Gun Motor Carriage M36 began to arrive in Europe, and mostly replaced the M10 by the end of the war. The plans to retain any towed battalions at all were canceled after their generally poor performance and high losses in 1944, especially during the Battle of the Bulge.

In the Italian campaign, as in northern Europe, the M10s were normally attached to infantry or armored units as infantry support or mobile artillery, more so the latter because of the general lack of German armor in that theater. Many US divisional commanders asked for their M10s to be replaced with fully armored tanks. In the Pacific war, due to the lack of serious Japanese tank opposition, US Army M10s were not used as tank destroyers, but as mobile artillery and infantry support. The M10 proved unpopular in the Pacific due to its open turret, which left it vulnerable to Japanese close-assault antitank tactics.

=== British Army ===
3in SPM M10 conversions to 17pdr
| Month | Conversions |
|---|---|
| May 1944 | 98 |
| June 1944 | 81 |
| July 1944 | 69 |
| August 1944 | 70 |
| September 1944 | 112 |
| October 1944 | 126 |
| November 1944 | 152 |
| December 1944 | 82 |
| January 1945 | 86 |
| February 1945 | 95 |
| March 1945 | 30 |
| April 1945 | 18 |
| Total | 1,017 |

The United States supplied 1,648 M10s to the British Army via the Lend-Lease program. (Note: The British were the conduit for Lend-Lease materiel to the French and Polish forces.) The British gave them the designation 3inch Self-propelled Mount M10 (3-in SPM M10). The M10 with the "wedge" counterweight was known as the "3in SPM M10 Mk I" and the M10 with the "duck bill" counterweight was the "3in SPM M10 Mk II". 1,017 of the vehicles were up-gunned with the powerful 17-pounder (76.2mm) gun from May 1944 to April 1945. Within the Department of Tank Design both the 3-inch and 17-pounder versions were known as "Achilles". (Note: This fitted in the British naming system, along with the Archer, the Avenger, and the Alecto; the name was rarely used by troops during the war) The 17-pounder conversions were designated with a "C" suffix added on to the "M10" designation, called "17pdr M10" or "Achilles Ic". Most of the vehicles converted were the 3in SPM M10 Mk II, as the duck bill counterweight balanced the heavy gun better. The gun mantlet needed modification to accept the barrel. Although the 17-pounder was a similar bore to the 3-inch gun M7, it had a longer barrel and used a larger propellant charge giving far superior armor penetrating capabilities. Using the APDS round, the gun performance was increased by about 50%. The 17pdr SP was used by the British, Canadian and Polish armies in Italy and northwest Europe. As well as service with British forces in Northwest Europe, they were retained post-war. Those not upgunned were stripped of their turrets and used as artillery tractors.

In British service, as self-propelled anti-tank guns, the M10 was operated by regiments of the Royal Artillery. Typically, two batteries had M10s while the other two batteries had the towed 17-pounder gun. One tactical theory was that the two towed batteries would form a gun line, while an M10 battery remained mobile on each flank to drive or lead enemy tanks to the static gun line. In practice, UK batteries were frequently separated in Normandy, M10s being seconded to British tank brigades equipped with Churchill tanks armed with the general purpose 75 mm gun just as were British 17 pounder conversions.

=== Free French Army ===
The Free French received at least 227 M10s, 155 of them through Lend-Lease. They served first in Italy, then in France and Germany. During the liberation of Paris in August 1944, a single M10 of General Leclerc's 2nd Armored Division named "Siroco" disabled a Panther in the Place de la Concorde from under the Arc de Triomphe on the Place de L'Etoile, at 1,800 m. French M10s also saw action on the French-German border around Strasbourg and in southern Germany; the Free French First Army led by General De Lattre received some when they were a part of the Sixth United States Army Group. French M10s were operated along similar lines as US tank destroyer units, although initially with five vehicles per platoon instead of four.

=== Red Army ===
Approximately 52 M10s were supplied to the Soviet Union through Lend-Lease. They were used to form two self-propelled artillery regiments (SPA). The first was the 1223rd Self-propelled Artillery Regiment of the 29th Tank Corps, part of the 5th Guards Tank Army. This unit served on the 3rd Belorussian Front in 1944, taking part in summer campaigns in Belorussia, the Baltic, and East Prussia. The 1239th Self-propelled Artillery Regiment was part of the 16th Tank Corps, 2nd Tank Army. It fought in Belarus and Poland in 1944.

=== Israel ===
Israel bought M10s from scrapyards and dumping grounds in Europe after 1948. They had the idea to up-gun the M10 with the modern SA50 gun, which was considered an improvement. The first batch arrived in 1951 and were in very bad shape. Some years later, as the M10's guns were worn out, Israel decided to install 17-pounder guns and also French high-velocity 75 mm CN 75-50 guns that had just been bought. These were called the M50 Achilles. Israel requested the assistance of France to develop the new tank in 1953. After building the prototype, France taught Israel how to do it themselves and provided their technical knowledge related to this development along with a contract to sell the SA50 guns and ammunition. The M10s were repaired and entered service in 1955. Israel captured Egyptian Sherman tanks that had diesel engines during the 1956 war and installed the engines in M10s. They were withdrawn from service by 1966.

=== Egypt ===
The Egyptian Army had a small number of ex-British M10s, 3-inch and 17-pdr versions, and used them in the 1948 Arab-Israeli War against Israel. Israel captured some of them.

== Combat performance ==
M10 strength and losses in the ETO
| Month | M10 strength | M10 losses |
|---|---|---|
| June 1944 | 691 | 1 |
| July 1944 | 743 | 17 |
| August 1944 | 758 | 28 |
| September 1944 | 763 | 40 |
| October 1944 | 486 | 71 |
| November 1944 | 573 | 45 |
| December 1944 | 790 | 62 |
| January 1945 | 760 | 69 |
| February 1945 | 686 | 106 |
| March 1945 | 684 | 27 |
| April 1945 | 427 | 37 |
| May 1945 | 427 | 37 |

The M10's open-topped turret left the crew vulnerable to artillery and mortar fire and fragments. The 893rd Tank Destroyer Battalion took many casualties from artillery fire and tree bursts and lost 16 of 24 M10s during the Battle of the Hürtgen Forest. The crew was also exposed to sniper fire and infantry close assault, such as grenades thrown through the open turret, or attacks from upper story-windows, especially in urban warfare and wooded areas.

However, the open-topped turret gave excellent visibility, which was valuable for a vehicle that was tasked with finding enemy armored vehicles and other targets. The open top also made escape easier when the vehicle was hit and improved communications with accompanying infantry.

The M10 had a very slow turret rotation speed, as the turret traverse was unpowered and the crew used a hand crank to rotate the turret. It took approximately 80 seconds to rotate a full 360 degrees.

Total M10 losses in the European Theater of Operations to all causes were 539.

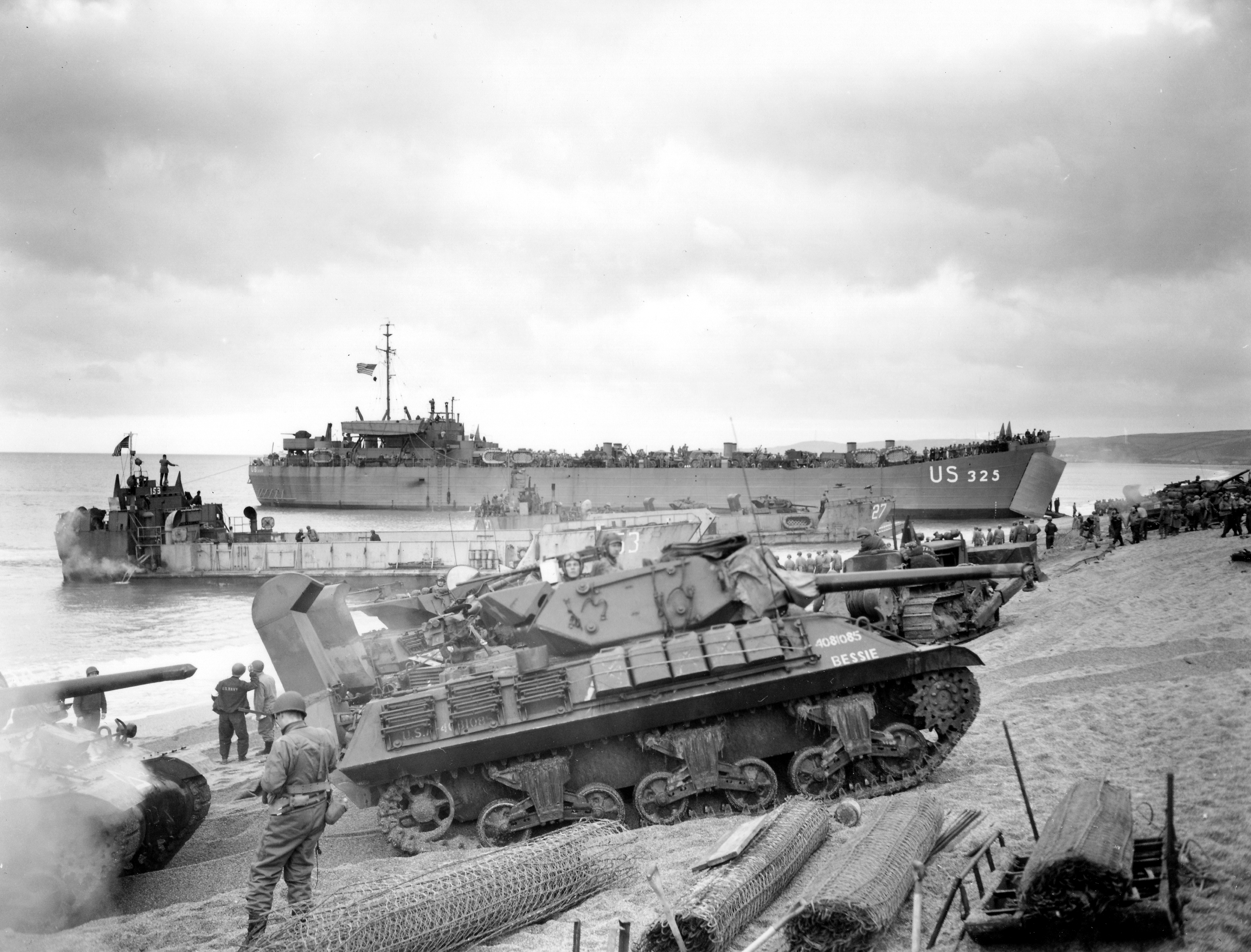
M10 tank destroyers disembarking on a Normandy beach to join the fighting.

Despite not adhering strictly to the tank destroyer doctrine, the M10 still achieved impressive scores against enemy tanks. A US Army study of 39 tank destroyer battalions found that each destroyed, on average, 34 tanks, 17 towed guns, and 16 pillboxes. The tank destroyer battalions in the Third Army claimed the destruction of 686 tanks and 238 self-propelled guns. The highest-scoring tank destroyer battalion in the European Theater, the 823rd Tank Destroyer Battalion, claimed to have destroyed 113 panzers, including 27 Panthers and 18 Tigers, using towed guns and M10s. The 773rd Tank Destroyer Battalion also claimed to have destroyed 113 panzers, with the 702nd Tank Destroyer Battalion claiming 103. The 601st Tank Destroyer Battalion, which fought in North Africa, Italy, and Europe, claimed to have knocked out 155 tanks and self-propelled guns. Tank destroyers in the European Theater fired approximately 11 high-explosive (HE) rounds for every round of armour-piercing (AP) ammunition, an indication of their use in general support duties in addition to the intended mission of anti-tank defense.

== Variants ==
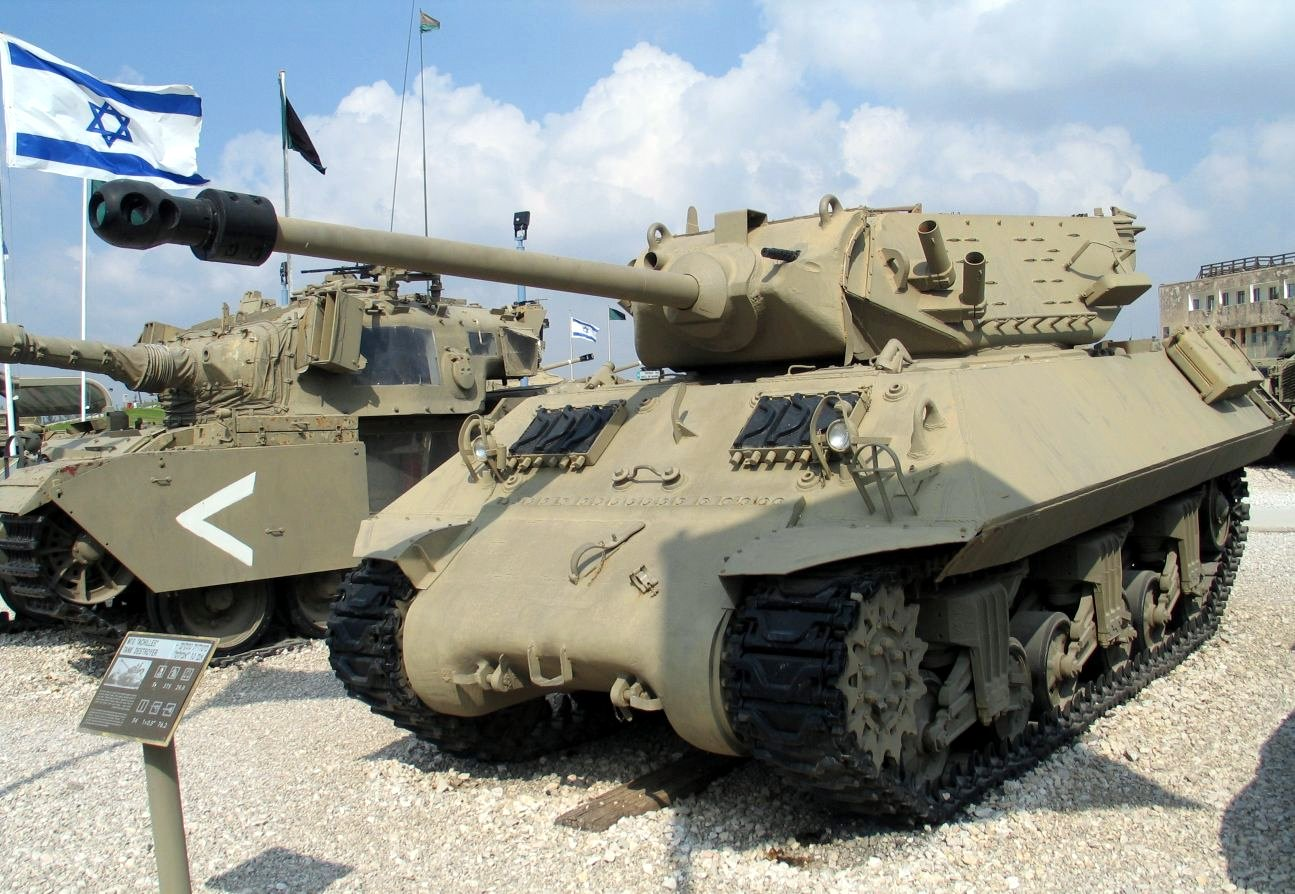
M10C. The muzzle brake and a small counterweight bolted to the gun barrel are visible.

- 3-inch Gun Motor Carriage T35 (Prototype): M4A2 medium tank chassis
- 3-inch Gun Motor Carriage T35E1 (Prototype): Redesign of T35 with thinner sloped armor. Turret design changed and vehicle standardized as M10.
- 3-inch Gun Motor Carriage M10
- 3-inch Gun Motor Carriage M10A1: M4A3 medium tank chassis
- 3in SPM M10: M10 in British Army service that was equipped with the 3-inch gun M7.
  - The M10 with the "wedge" counterweight was designated 3in SPM M10 Mk I
  - The M10 with the "duck bill" counterweight was designated 3in SPM M10 Mk II
- M10C or 17pdr M10: M10 in British Army service that was equipped with a 76mm Ordnance QF 17 pounder Mark V gun as used on some British tanks. They can be identified by the muzzle brake at the end of the barrel and a counterweight behind the muzzle brake. Post-war the name Achilles has become associated with the 17pdr; contemporary sources referred to it as a "Firefly", not to be confused with post-war use of the name for the 17pdr Sherman tank.
- M35 Prime Mover: Turretless M10A1 used as an artillery tractor
- 3in SP Ram Mk I: Proposed Canadian-built version using a Ram tank chassis – a single prototype was built in 1942.
- M10 Self-Propelled Howitzer: Demilitarized M10s transferred to the Republic of China in 1949 and rearmed with modified ex-Imperial Japanese Army 105 mm infantry howitzers. Other modifications included a permanent turret roof with crew hatches, lighter and more impact-resistant armor, and a bow machine gun. One prototype and 16 follow-on vehicles were made.
- Israeli M10s: Israeli Ordnance Corps converted tanks, using 75mm guns received from France. This gun was fitted to a number of M10s (originally Achilles tank destroyers), that were renamed as M-50 Achilles tank destroyers.

== Users ==
- Canada British modified 17pdr SP Achilles
- Denmark
- Egypt
- France
- Free France
- Israel
- Italy
- New Zealand
- Philippines
- Poland
- Republic of China
- Nazi Germany (Captured vehicles)
- South Africa
- Republic of Korea
- USSR
- United Kingdom used both the M10 and the 17-pdr SP Achilles, a variant with an Ordnance QF 17-pounder
- United States
- Netherlands

== See also ==
- List of U.S. military vehicles by model number
- Rhino tank
- Operation Greif, where Nazi Germany attempted to disguise Panther tanks as M10 Tank destroyers.

=== Vehicles of comparable role, performance and era ===
- American M36 GMC
- British SP 17pdr, A30 (Avenger)
- German Hetzer and Sturmgeschütz III
- Japanese Type 1 Ho-Ni I and Type 3 Ho-Ni III
- Italian Semovente da 75/34
- Romanian Mareșal
- Soviet SU-85
- Soviet SU-100

== Sources ==
- Doyle, David: M10 Tank Destroyer in Action. 2015. Squadron/Signal Publications. ISBN 9780897478007
- Hunnicutt, R.P. Sherman: A History of the American Medium Tank. 1978. Echo Point Books and Media, LLC. ISBN 9781626548619.
- Miller, Edward G.: A Dark and Bloody Ground: The Hürtgen Forest and the Roer River Dams, 1944–1945. 2003. Texas A&M University Press. 978-1585442584
- Yeide, Harry: The Tank Killers: A History of America's World War II Tank Destroyer Force. 2010. Casemate Publishing. ISBN 9781932033809
- Zaloga, Steven J.: M10 and M36 Tank Destroyers 1942–53 (New Vanguard 57). 2002. Osprey Publishing. ISBN 9781841764696
- Zaloga, Steven J.: M10 Tank Destroyer vs StuG III Assault Gun: Germany 1944 (Duel 53). 2013. Osprey Publishing. ISBN 9781780960999
- Zaloga, Steven J.: M18 Hellcat Tank Destroyer 1943-97 (New Vanguard 97). 2004. Osprey Publishing. ISBN 9781841766874
- Zaloga, Steven J.: US Tank and Tank Destroyer Battalions in the ETO 1944-45 (Battle Orders 10). 2005. Osprey Publishing. ISBN 9781841767987
- US Army Field Manuals
  - FM 18-5 Tactical Employment, Tank Destroyer Unit
  - FM 18-5B Organization and Tactics of Tank Destroyer Units
  - FM 18-15 Tank Destroyer Drill and Crew Drill: 3-Inch Gun Motor Carriage M10, 76-mm Gun Motor Carriage T70, 3-Inch Towed Gun (Gun M5 and Carriage M1)
  - FM 18-20 Tactical Employment of Tank Destroyer Platoon Self-Propelled
- US Army Technical Manuals
  - TM 9-2800 Standard Military Motor Vehicles
  - TM 9-323 – M7 Gun.
  - TM 9-731G – Carriage, Motor, 3-inch, M10A1
  - TM 9-752A – Carriage, Motor, 3-inch, M10
  - TM 9-1750 – Power train unit (3-piece differential case)
  - TM 9-1750B – Power train unit (1-piece differential case)
  - TM 9-1750G – General Motors twin diesel
- US Army Supply Catalogue "Standard Nomenclature List"
  - SNL G130 – for Carriage, Motor, 3-inch, M10
  - SNL C-43 – M7 gun.
- Glue, W A; Pringle, D J C (1957), 20th Battalion and Armoured Regiment, The Official History of New Zealand in the Second World War 1939-1945
