= Oilgear =

American manufacturer of fluid power and hydraulic equipment

Oilgear Company is an American manufacturer of fluid power and hydraulic equipment, including pumps, valves, motors, meters and other components, as well as integrated systems, headquartered in Traverse City, Michigan. It was founded in 1921 in Milwaukee, Wisconsin, as an offshoot of hydraulic power work being done for Bucyrus-Erie, manufacturing a line of hydraulic presses, and successfully weathered the Great Depression, gradually expanding its product line, including being one of the first companies to use microprocessors with hydraulics, and in the early 1980s began expanded its research and development budgets to build complete computer-controlled manufacturing systems, buying only the memory chips.

In 2006, with manufacturing and service facilities in about 15 countries around the world, it was taken private by Mason Wells at a cost of over $30 million. As of 2011, it had roughly 750 employees globally, with units in Mexico, France, Italy, Great Britain, and Germany. Acquisitions since founding include Petrodyne, Towler Hydraulics, Olmsted Products and Clover Industries. Competitors include Flowserve and Parker Hannifin.

In May 2015, it was announced that Oilgear would close down its Milwaukee factory, moving the production formerly done there to plants in Traverse City, Michigan, and Fremont, Nebraska and eliminating 45 jobs. This would leave 85 jobs in the Milwaukee area, consisting of engineering and regional support staff, who would be moved to a smaller facility in the Milwaukee area. The shuttered facility was sold in 2016 to Global Power Components, which announced plans to move its manufacturing operations from three existing facilities in nearby West Allis into the 250,000 square foot former Oilgear factory.
