= T55E1 gun motor carriage =

US prototype tank destroyer

T55E1 motor carriage
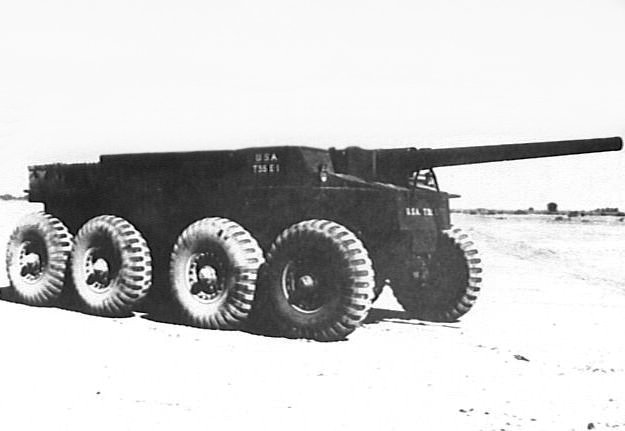
- Type: Gun motor carriage
- Place of origin: United States

Production history
- No. built: 1

Specifications
- Mass: 30,200 lb (13.7 t)
- Length: 23 ft 5 in (7.14 m)
- Width: 9 ft (2.7 m)
- Height: 6 ft 4 in (1.93 m)
- Crew: 4
- Main armament: 3 inch gun 90 rounds
- Secondary armament: .50 M2 Browning Machine Gun; 400 rounds
- Engine: 2 x Cadillac. 8-cylinder V type, water-cooled engines 110 hp x 2
- Power/weight: 16.04
- Suspension: 8x8 wheel
- Maximum speed: 60 mph (97 km/h)

The T55E1 3-inch gun motor carriage was a prototype vehicle developed by the Allied Machinery Manufacturing Company in 1943 for the US Army. An eight-wheel drive vehicle, the T55E1 was armed with one three-inch gun in a limited traverse mounting and a supporting .50 caliber machine gun.

== Development ==
Cook Brothers had developed an unusual vehicle for desert conditions. This had two four-wheel-drive bogies each with its own engine. Steering was by pivoting the front bogie. They then developed their design into a tank destroyer with two engines at the rear. There was sufficient interest from the Army for a contract for development as the T55. Testing led to modifications to the pilot as the T55E1. Further testing confirmed that it was not suitable and the T55E1 was cancelled.

Power was from two Cadillac eight-cylinder water-cooled engines. Production began in 1943, however by this time preference had shifted to tracked anti-tank vehicles, and the T55E1 was cancelled.
