= 3-inch anti-aircraft gun M3 =

American anti-aircraft gun

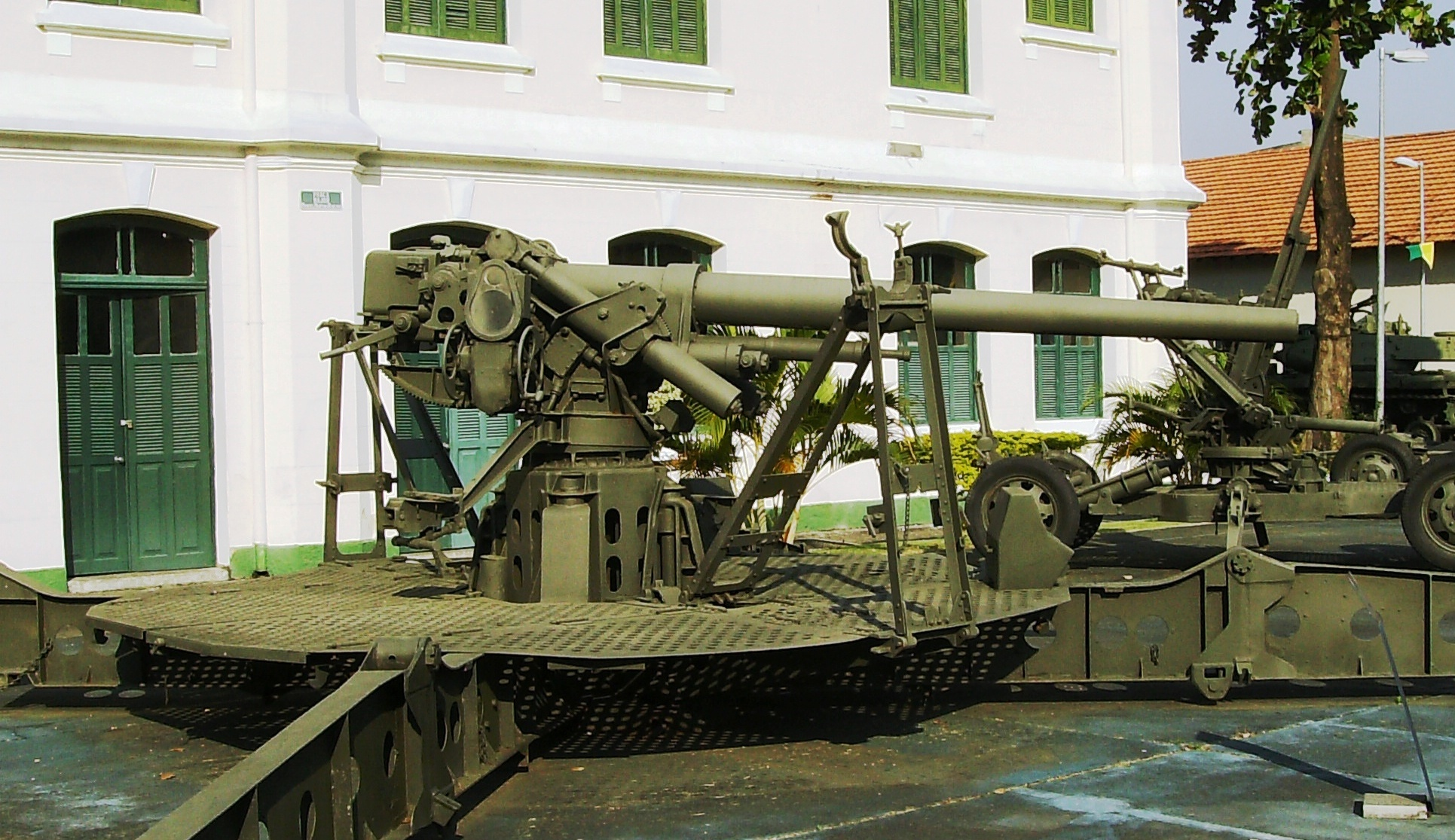
- A 3-inch M3 anti-aircraft gun on a M2A2 carriage in firing position with outriggers and crew platform unfolded, preserved in Brazil
- Type: Anti-aircraft gun
- Place of origin: USA

Service history
- In service: 1928–1945
- Used by: USA
- Wars: World War II

Production history
- Designed: 1927
- Produced: 1928
- Variants: Anti-tank

Specifications
- Mass: Complete: 16,800 lb (7,600 kg); Barrel: 2,302 lb (1,044 kg)
- Length: 25 ft (7.6 m)
- Barrel length: 12.6 ft (3.8 m) 50 caliber
- Width: 7 ft (2.1 m)
- Height: 9.4 ft (2.9 m)
- Shell: Fixed QF 76.2 x 585R
- Shell weight: Complete: 24.6 lb (11.2 kg); Projectile: 12.8 lb (5.8 kg)
- Caliber: 76.2 mm (3 in)
- Action: Semi-automatic
- Breech: Vertical sliding-wedge
- Recoil: Hydro-pneumatic
- Carriage: Four wheel with four collapsible outriggers
- Elevation: −1° to +80°
- Traverse: 360°
- Rate of fire: 25 rpm
- Muzzle velocity: 854 m/s (2,800 ft/s)
- Effective firing range: 21,000 ft (6,400 m) +85°
- Maximum firing range: 8.3 mi (13.4 km) +45°

The 3-inch anti-aircraft gun M3 was an American anti-aircraft gun which served throughout the 1930s and into early World War II. Developed from the earlier 3-inch M1917 and 3-inch M1918 guns, it was in the process of being replaced by the time of the US entry into World War II, but was subsequently adapted into an anti-tank gun role, both free-standing (as the 3-inch M5) and in a self-propelled tank destroyer (the M10). It may have seen action in the Pacific Theatre.

== History ==
During the late 1920s, M1917 and M1918 guns were fitted with removable barrel liners and re-designated as 3-inch M1, M2, or M3 guns, depending on the variant they were upgraded from. The most numerous variant was the M3 which was introduced in 1928 and consisted of a new barrel with a removable autofretted liner. During the 1930s further upgrades were proposed but these were abandoned with the adoption of the 90 mm gun M1 in 1938.

== Design ==
The M3 consisted of a 76.2 mm (3 in) barrel 50 calibers in length, which had a removable liner and a semi-automatic vertical sliding-wedge breech. The barrel had a hydro-pneumatic recoil system, and when the gun fired, the breech automatically ejected the shell casing and remained open until a new round was loaded. The gun was provided with a set of equilibrators and was capable of both high angle fire +80° and 360° of traverse.

The M2A2 carriage was of a symmetrical cruciform shape, mounting the gun in the center and having four outriggers for stability. A roughly circular crew platform allowed the crew 360 degrees of working space around the gun. For transport, each quarter of the crew platform was folded backwards in half, against itself, and then each section was pivoted perpendicularly to the folding point to face upwards, against the section next to it. Travel locks were engaged to hold the breech and barrel of the gun steady. Correspondingly, each outrigger arm was folded into thirds and pivoted parallel to the two sides of the now-folded crew platform. A two-wheeled single axle bogie equipped with pneumatic tires and electric brakes that cradled the folded outriggers was then attached to each side. The new carriage allowed towing at high speed.

== Anti-tank gun ==
In September 1940 a project started to adapt the 3-inch gun to the anti-tank role, starting with the T9 experimental model but equipping it with the breech, recoil system and carriage borrowed from the 105mm M2 howitzer. The gun was accepted for service as the 3-inch M5.

A similar derivative of the T9 – the 3-inch M6 – was intended to be mounted on the M5 self-propelled gun, which was eventually abandoned. A final adaptation was the 3-inch M7, which included minor modifications for mounting on the M6 heavy tank and M10 tank destroyer. The M7 saw wide use although it was supplanted to some extent by more powerful weapons such as the 90mm M3 and the British QF 17 pounder. A total of 6,824 M7 guns were manufactured.

== Ammunition ==
The M3 fired a Fixed QF 76.2 × 585R round and a number of different styles of ammunition were available:

- Armor-piercing
- Armor-piercing capped
- High explosive

== Photo gallery ==
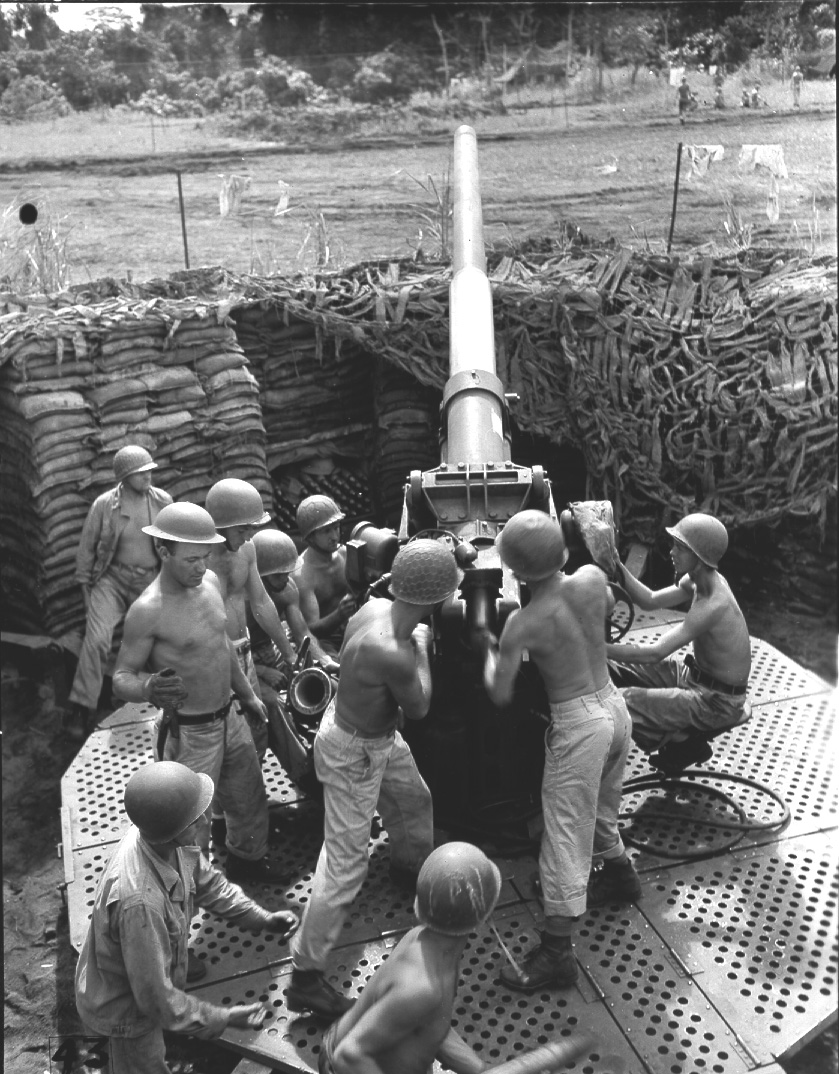
No. 2 Gun Crew, Btry D, 208th CA AA, man their 3-inch AA gun at New Fighter Strip, Dobodura, New Guinea (17 May 1943).

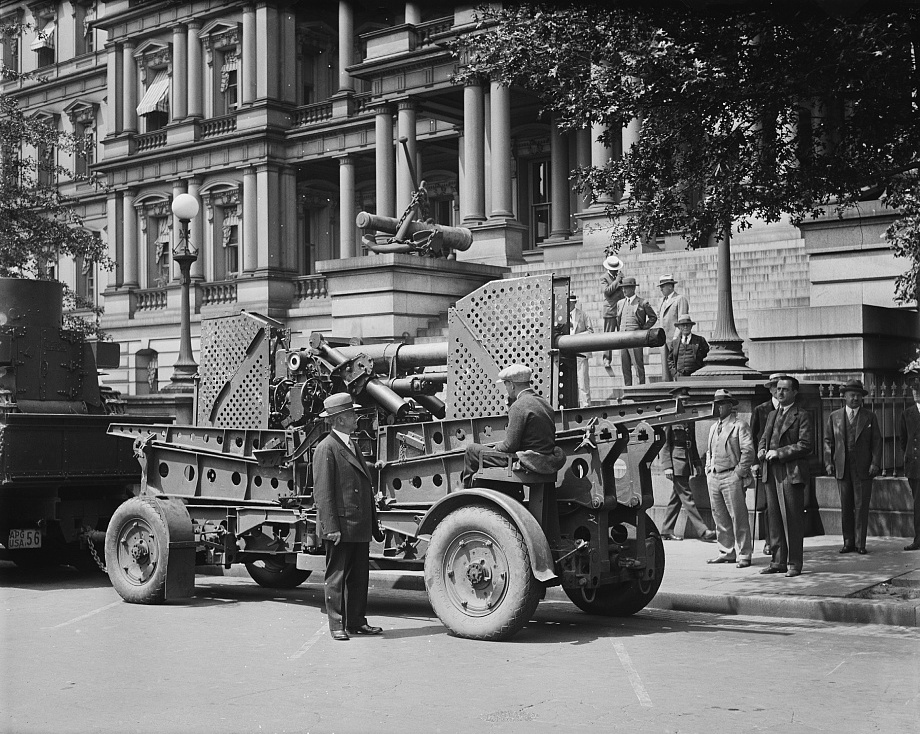
Secretary of War James W. Good inspects an M3 in traveling position near the White House in 1929.

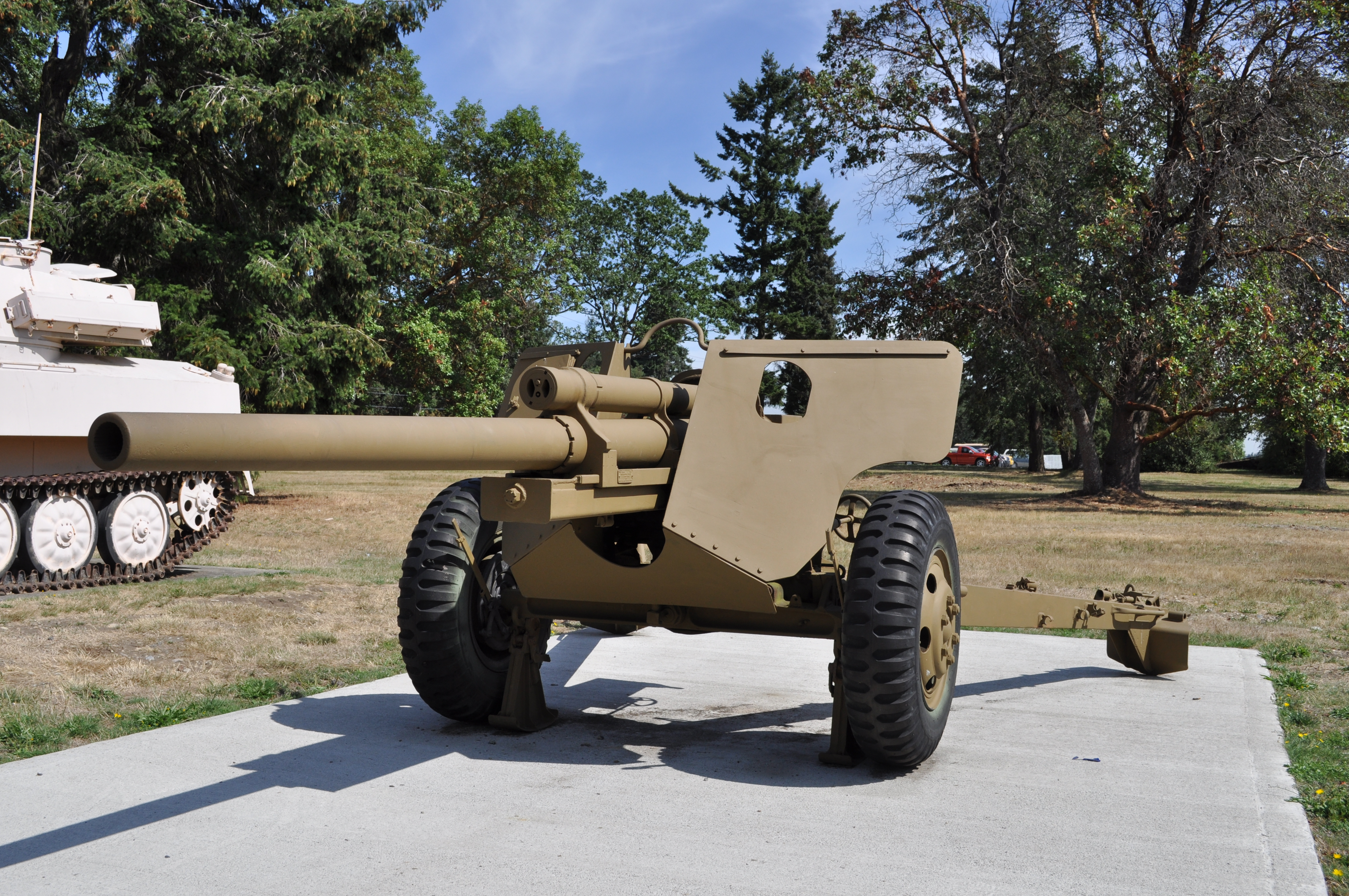
3-inch anti-tank gun M5 at Fort Lewis, Washington, USA.

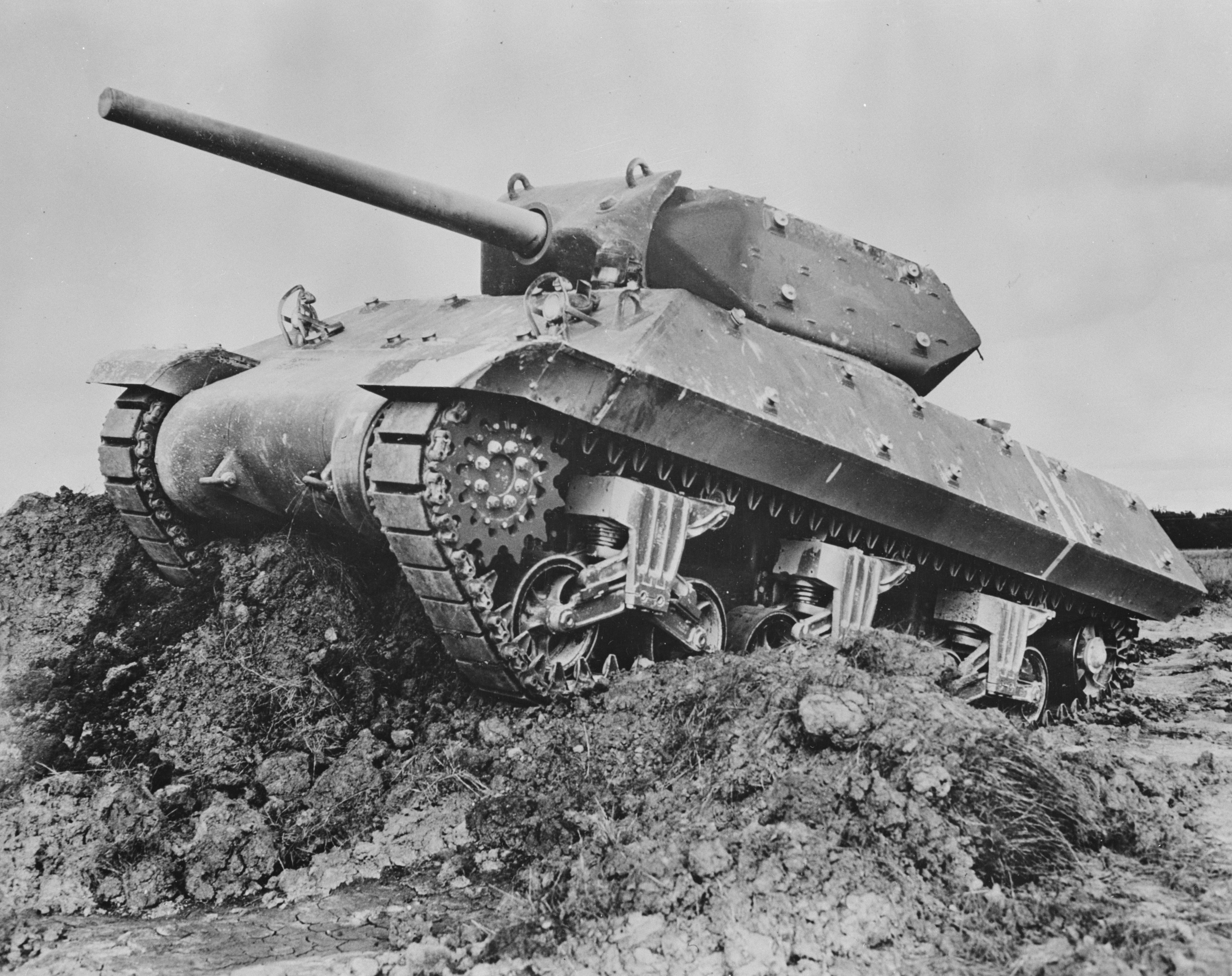
M10 tank destroyer with the 3-inch gun M7.

== See also ==
- G-numbers
- List of anti-aircraft guns

=== Weapons of comparable role, performance and era ===
- British Vickers Model 1931
- Japanese Type 88 75 mm AA Gun
- Soviet 76 mm air defense gun M1931
