= M75 armored personnel carrier =

M75
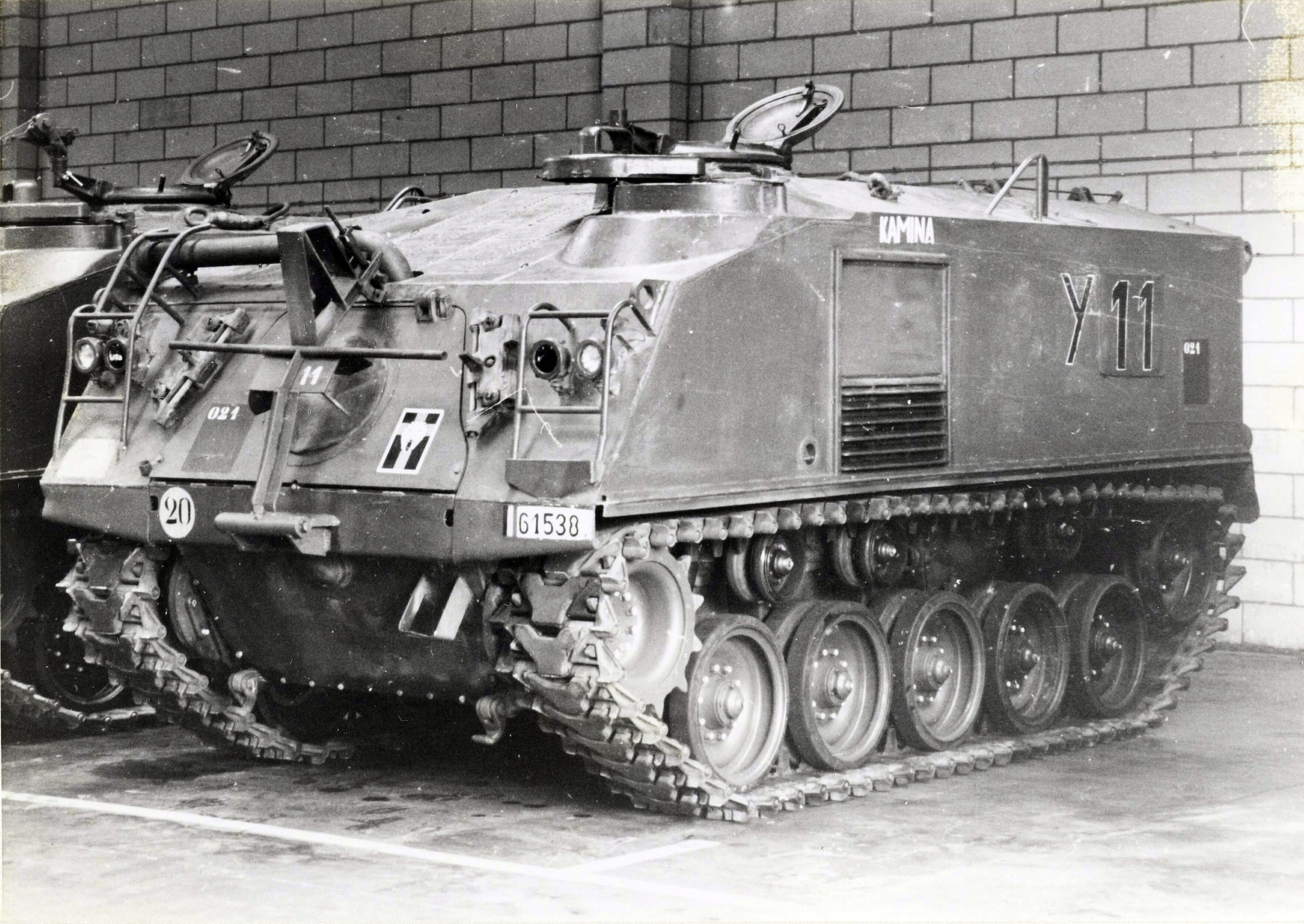
- M75 in the role of a mortar carrier in service with the Belgian Armed Forces
- Type: Armored personnel carrier
- Place of origin: United States

Service history
- In service: 1952-late 1980s
- Used by: United States; Belgium; Morocco
- Wars: Korean War

Production history
- Manufacturer: International Harvester Corporation
- No. built: 1,729

Specifications
- Mass: 42,000 lb (18,800 kg)
- Length: 204.5 inches (5.2 m)
- Width: 112 inches (2.85 m)
- Height: 108.5 inches (2.75 m)
- Armor: 1.5 inches (38 mm) maximum
- Main armament: M2 Browning machine gun
- Engine: Continental AO-895-4 6-cylinder air-cooled gasoline 295 horsepower (220 kW) (at 2,660 rpm)
- Suspension: Torsion bar
- Fuel capacity: 150 US gallons (568 L)
- Operational range: 115 miles (185 km)
- Maximum speed: 43 mph (69 km/h)

The M75 armored infantry vehicle is an American armored personnel carrier that was produced between December 1952 and February 1954, and saw service in the Korean War. It was replaced in U.S. service by the far cheaper, amphibious and lower-profile M59. The M75s were given as military aid to Belgium, where they were used until the early 1980s (771 units in 1976). 1,729 M75s were built before production was stopped.

== Development ==
Towards the end of World War II, tracked, fully enclosed armored personnel carriers were developed based on the M18 Hellcat. These were first the M39 (T41) and then M44 (T16) carriers. Like the improvised 'Kangaroo' carriers of WWII the M39 kept the location of the rear engine and required its occupants to exit over the sides, but the M44 reworked the tank's body completely and moved the engine to the front, allowing more internal space and rear doors. The M44 was extremely large (51,000 lb combat weight), carrying 24 infantry as well as a driver, bow gunner and vehicle commander. It was evaluated at Fort Knox and Aberdeen Proving Ground after the end of the war, but, ultimately, the army rejected the M44 as being too large - at the time, their tactical doctrine required infantry squads of ten men. As a result, only a handful of M44s were built, seeing service in a number of auxiliary roles.

On 21 September 1945, a set of requirements were laid down for a squad sized armored personnel carrier, based on the chassis of the T43 cargo carrier. On 26 September 1946, the development of the T18 armored utility vehicle, based on the running gear of the T41 light tank, was approved with International Harvester (IHC) contracted to produce four prototypes. The original mockup, which was designed to carry 14 people, including crew, featured two remote controlled .50 caliber machine guns, which could be aimed remotely by either the commander or either of the two gunners.

The first prototype in 1948 T18 dropped the assistant driver, but retained the remote controlled machine guns. The T18E1 pilot was unarmed and had a high cupola for the commander, this is sometimes referred to as pilot number 4. The T18E2 replaced the commander's cupola with a T122 machine gun mount, which could be fitted with either a .30 or .50 caliber machine gun. Though the original T18E1 prototype was unarmed, the high cupola was replaced with a variety of machine gun mounts before the M13 cupola, with a .50 caliber machine gun, was evaluated.

The prototypes were originally powered by a six-cylinder Continental AO-895-2 air-cooled gasoline engine, which exhausted through the hull side grills. This was later replaced with the AO-895-4 in the T18E1, which exhausted through a pipe mounted horizontally across the front of the vehicle.

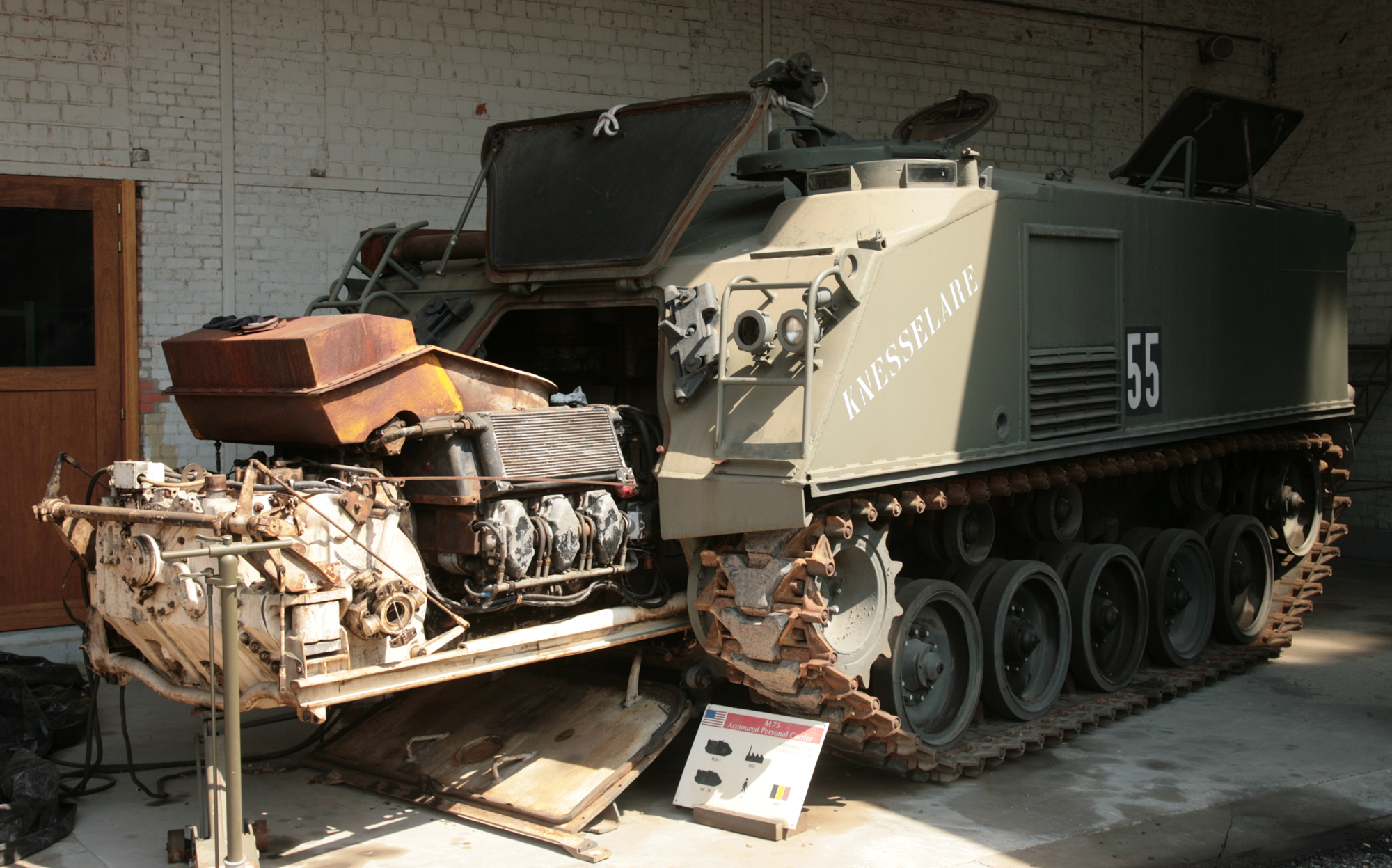
An M75 APC at the Brussels army museum, with the engine and transmission withdrawn for servicing

After acceptance testing, the T18E1 was ordered into production in 1952 as the M75. An order for 1,000 was placed with IHC and another, for 730, with the Food Machinery and Chemical Corporation. Numerous changes were made during the production run to reduce the cost and complexity. The number of shock absorbers was halved from four per side to two, and an auxiliary generator/heater was deleted. The two 75 gallon rubber fuel tanks were replaced by a single 150 gallon metal one.

The M75 shared many chassis/suspension components with the M41 Walker Bulldog light tank, which was also powered by a Continental air-cooled engine. It had a cross-drive transmission (permitting pivoting, etc.), but was steered through two vertical handles, simulating the laterals of earlier vehicles controlled by track clutching/braking. The approximate cost of the vehicle was $72,000, (Note: Ogorkiewicz gives this as variously reported between $89,000 and $132,000.) which contributed to the early halting of production. The high profile (height) of the vehicle was also a negative factor. Additionally, the engine air cooling vents were considered to be vulnerable to small arms fire. However, the reliability of its drive system was far superior to that of its replacement, the M59.

== Description ==
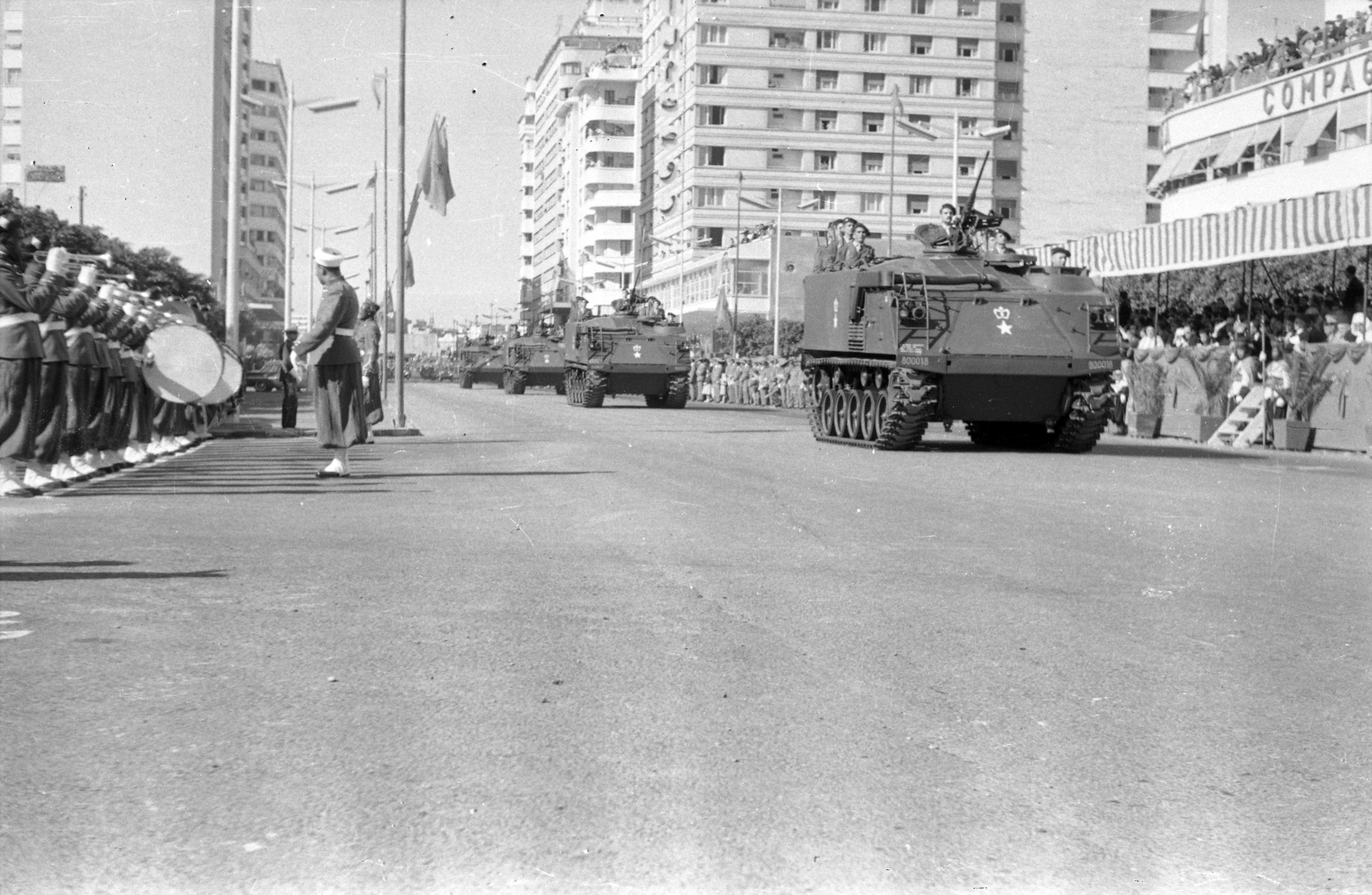
Military parade in Morocco, 1960

The M75 has a welded steel hull, which varies in thickness from 1 inch (2.5 cm) to 1.5 inches (3.8 cm) with a line of sight thickness on the front hull of between 1.6 inches (4 cm) and 2 inches (5 cm). Fully loaded, the vehicle weighed approximately 42,000 pounds (19,051 kg).

The M75 has an almost identical layout to later U.S. armored personnel carriers: the driver sits in the front left of the hull, with the air-cooled six-cylinder horizontally opposed Continental AO-895-4 gasoline engine to his right. The driver is provided with an M19 infra-red night vision periscope in later models and four M17 periscopes. Behind the driver and engine, in the center of the vehicle, sits the commander, who is provided with six vision blocks around his hatch. The commander has a cupola that was normally fitted with an M2 Browning, for which 1800 rounds were carried in the vehicle. The infantry sat behind the commander in a large compartment. Additionally, an M20 "Super Bazooka" was carried along with 10 rockets, and 180 rounds of ammunition for an M1 or M2 carbine.

The engine developed a maximum of around 295 horsepower (220 kW) at 2660 rpm, giving the vehicle a top speed of 43 mph (69 km/h). The vehicle carried 150 US gallons (568 L) of gasoline, giving it a road range of around 115 miles (185 km). It has five road wheels and three return rollers on each side.

== Additional specifications ==
- Fording depth: 48 in (121.9 cm) (80 in (203.2 cm) with fording kit)
- Vertical obstacle: 18 in (45.7 cm)
- Trench: 66 in (167.6 cm)
- Gradient: 60 percent

== See also ==
- List of U.S. military vehicles by supply catalog designation (G260)
- M39 armored utility vehicle
