= 824th Tank Destroyer Battalion =

Tank Destroyer Battalion

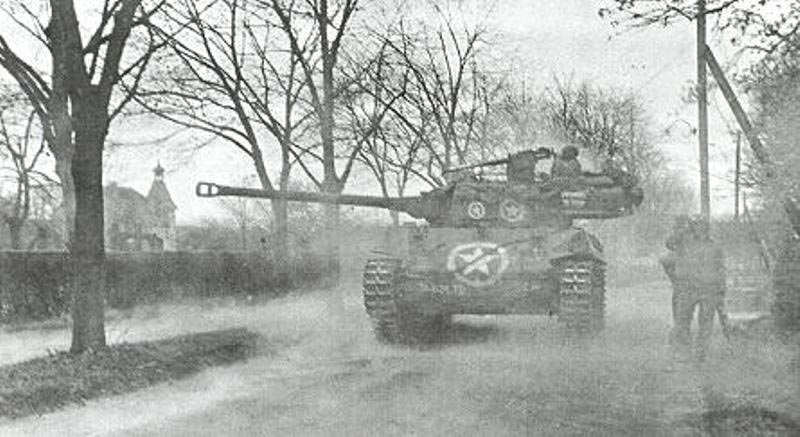
- An M18 near Wiesloch, Germany, on 1 April 1945. This is probably a vehicle of 3rd Platoon, C Company.
- Active: 1942–1945
- Disbanded: 1945
- Country: United States
- Allegiance: Army
- Part of: Independent unit
- Equipment: 3" anti-tank guns M18 Hellcat
- Decorations: 6 Silver Stars; 31 Bronze Stars (individual awards)

The 824th Tank Destroyer Battalion was a tank destroyer battalion of the United States Army active during the Second World War. It saw service during 1944–45 in the European Theater of Operations, primarily attached to the 100th Infantry Division in an infantry support role. After fighting through France and southern Germany, the battalion ended the war in Austria.

The 824th was originally formed in August 1942 in Oklahoma, and trained in the United States for two years. In October 1944, it deployed to France equipped with towed 3" anti-tank guns, and was assigned to support the Seventh Army, then fighting in Alsace. Here it supported the 100th Division as it pushed steadily eastwards towards Germany, and on 8–9 January 1945 was employed to repel a SS panzergrenadier attack during Operation Nordwind, the only time the unit is recorded as having destroyed an enemy tank.

After conversion to M18 Hellcat self-propelled tank destroyers, the battalion moved into Germany, helping force a bridgehead over the Neckar River at the Battle of Heilbronn. After reaching Stuttgart it was reassigned to the 103rd Infantry Division, and with them reached Innsbruck in Austria by VE Day. After two weeks of occupation duties it was ordered to prepare for service in the Pacific; however, while it was reforming in the United States, the Japanese surrender was announced, and the need for more combat units ended. The battalion was demobilized in September 1945.

== Early service ==
The battalion was formed at Camp Gruber, Oklahoma, on 10 August 1942, with a cadre of 31 officers and 77 men. It received 829 draftees from Camp Upton, New York, in mid-January 1943, bringing it up to slightly over full strength. The unit was nominally organised as a "tank destroyer battalion, heavy, self-propelled"; after some experimentation in 1941–2, this had become the standard organisation for tank destroyer units. Under this structure, the battalion would have three gun companies, each with three platoons of M3 self-propelled 75mm guns; each platoon had four gun crews and twelve additional men for command and security duties. These were supported by a fourth reconnaissance company with three reconnaissance platoons and one platoon of pioneers, and various headquarters and support elements.

After the men had been assembled at Camp Gruber, the battalion departed for Camp Bowie, Texas, where it carried out three months of basic training, and in mid-April was transferred to Fort Hood, Texas, where it trained at the Tank Destroyer Tactical and Firing Center. While the 824th was at Fort Hood, a new organisational structure was announced for tank destroyer battalions, converting them from self-propelled guns to towed 3" anti-tank guns; the 824th was officially reorganised to the new pattern in July. This had the same number of guns - three companies, with three platoons of four guns - but the reconnaissance company was reduced to two platoons and merged into the headquarters company, while the pioneers were removed entirely.

On completing unit training at Fort Hood in August, the 824th was transferred to Louisiana for field maneuvers, returning to Camp Bowie in January 1944. The battalion finally left the United States in October 1944, sailing from New York aboard the USS Lejeune on 14 October and landing at Marseilles on 28 October.

== Fighting in Alsace ==
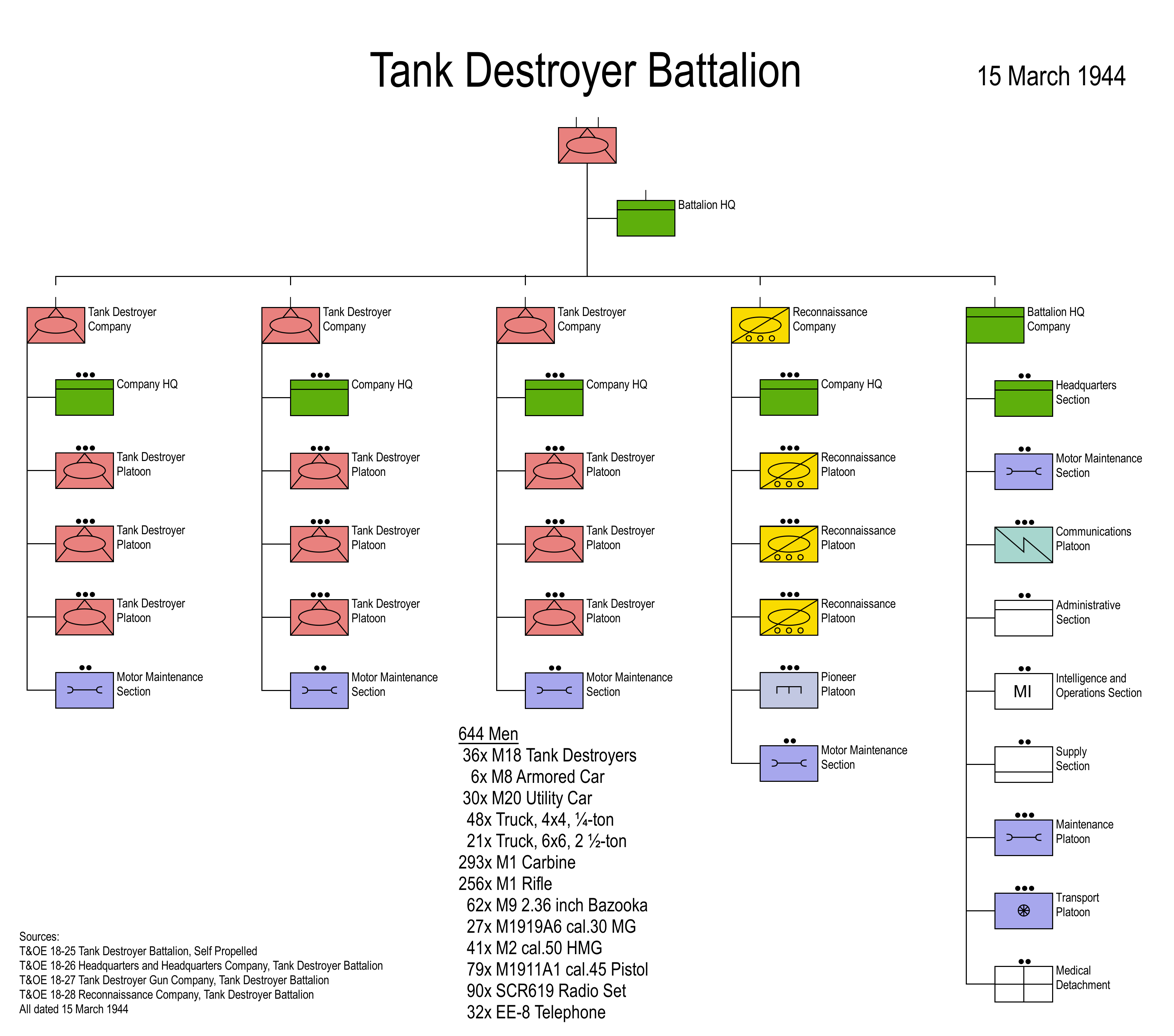
Tank Destroyer Battalion (SP) Structure - March 1944

The battalion first saw frontline service on 28 November, when two companies were attached to the 397th Infantry Regiment (100th Infantry Division), which was itself temporarily attached to the 45th Infantry Division, fighting in the Vosges Mountains under the Seventh Army. The battalion took its first casualties the following day, with four men in A Company killed and three wounded by artillery and mortar fire. The following day, a gun crew of the same company fired the battalion's first shots in anger, destroying a machine-gun position. The battalion pushed eastwards with the 100th and 45th Divisions until mid-December, with individual gun crews providing direct fire support to infantrymen assaulting German defensive positions, as well as indirect artillery fire.

On 21 December, after the start of the German offensive in the Ardennes, the Seventh Army was ordered onto the defensive. A Company of the 824th was attached to the 106th Cavalry Group, covering the far left flank of the Army, while the other two gun companies remained with the infantry of 100th Division. The anticipated enemy offensive, Operation Nordwind, began on the night of New Year's Eve. After heavy infantry fighting, German armored units were engaged on 8–9 January 1945, when the 17th SS Panzergrenadier Division attacked the 397th Infantry Regiment, supported by B Company of the 824th; one gun was lost in return for one tank and several half-tracks. This is the only occurrence noted in the battalion history in which the battalion engaged enemy armor. Two guns were temporarily abandoned by B Company when their supporting infantry retreated. A group of eight men returned to recover them the following night; all were awarded Bronze Stars for bravery. Additionally, one gun commander was awarded the Bronze Star for holding his gun in an exposed position during an attack.

Through the rest of January and February, the battalion remained in defensive positions, with crews rotating to the neighboring 776th Tank Destroyer Battalion in order to train on self-propelled tank destroyers. The 824th was prepared for conversion to the new equipment by early March, but this was delayed in order to support the 100th Division's attack on Bitche as part of Operation Undertone from 15–19 March.

== Advance into Germany ==
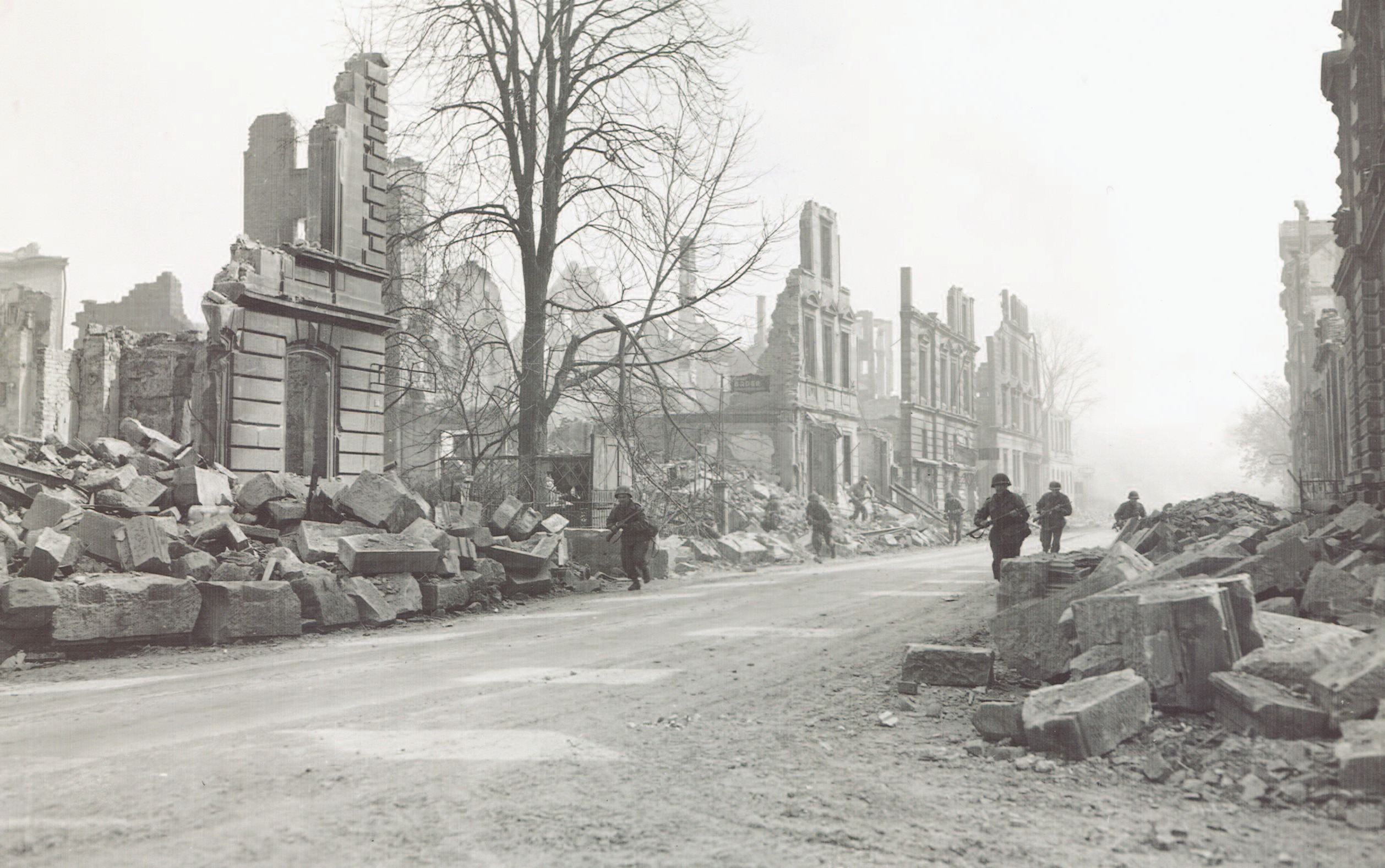
100th Division infantrymen advancing through ruins in Heilbronn; the German city was almost completely destroyed by the fighting and earlier heavy air raids.

In the last week of March, the battalion finally withdrew to refit with the M18 Hellcat self-propelled tank destroyer. In so doing, it reverted to the old self-propelled battalion organisation; three companies of twelve tank destroyers, plus a fourth reconnaissance company with a platoon of pioneers. The new organisation was smaller than the old - fewer men were needed for vehicle crews - and so even after the creation of the new Reconnaissance Company on 27 March, the 824th finished the month with a complement of 646 all ranks, down from 750.

Following the refit, it crossed the Rhine on 1 April, and was almost immediately returned to combat to support the 100th Division's attack on Heilbronn, an attempt to force a bridgehead across the Neckar River. The fighting began on 4 April, with C Company crossing the river into the centre of the city on 8 April; in the absence of enemy armor, they provided close fire support to infantrymen engaged in house-to-house fighting.

Once Heilbronn had been secured, the 100th Division, and the 824th with it, moved south towards Stuttgart. On 25 April, the 824th was reassigned to the 103rd Division, which was moving eastwards through Bavaria towards Austria; it finished the war, on VE Day, outside Innsbruck. After the end of hostilities, six men were awarded the Silver Star, and twenty-two more men were awarded Bronze Stars – one posthumously – bringing the battalion's total to six Silver Stars and thirty-one Bronze Stars.

The battalion carried out security and occupation duties, until handing over to the 384th Field Artillery Battalion on 17 May. It was then ordered to prepare for redeployment to the Pacific Theater of Operations, via the United States. In mid-June, the 824th headed west, leaving their vehicles at depots in northern France, and sailed from Le Havre aboard the SS John Howland and SS Thomas Cresap on 1 July. On arrival, the men were given one month of leave; on 18 August, however, the battalion was notified that it would be demobilized due to the surrender of Japan. Three weeks later, on 11 September, the battalion was formally demobilized at Fort Jackson, South Carolina, and ceased to exist.
