= Type 64 =

Type 64 may refer to:

- A North Korean variant of the FN M1900
- Type 64 MAT, anti-tank missile, Japan, introduced 1964
- Type 64 pistol, semi-automatic pistol, China, introduced 1980
- Type 64 (silenced pistol), silenced pistol, China, introduced 1964
- Type 64 submachine gun, sound-suppressed submachine gun, China, introduced c. 1966
- Howa Type 64, battle rifle, Japan, introduced 1964
- Type 64 (tank), light tank, Taiwan, introduced 1975
- Porsche 64, also known as the Type 64, the first automobile from what was to become the Porsche company
