= M59 armored personnel carrier =

M59
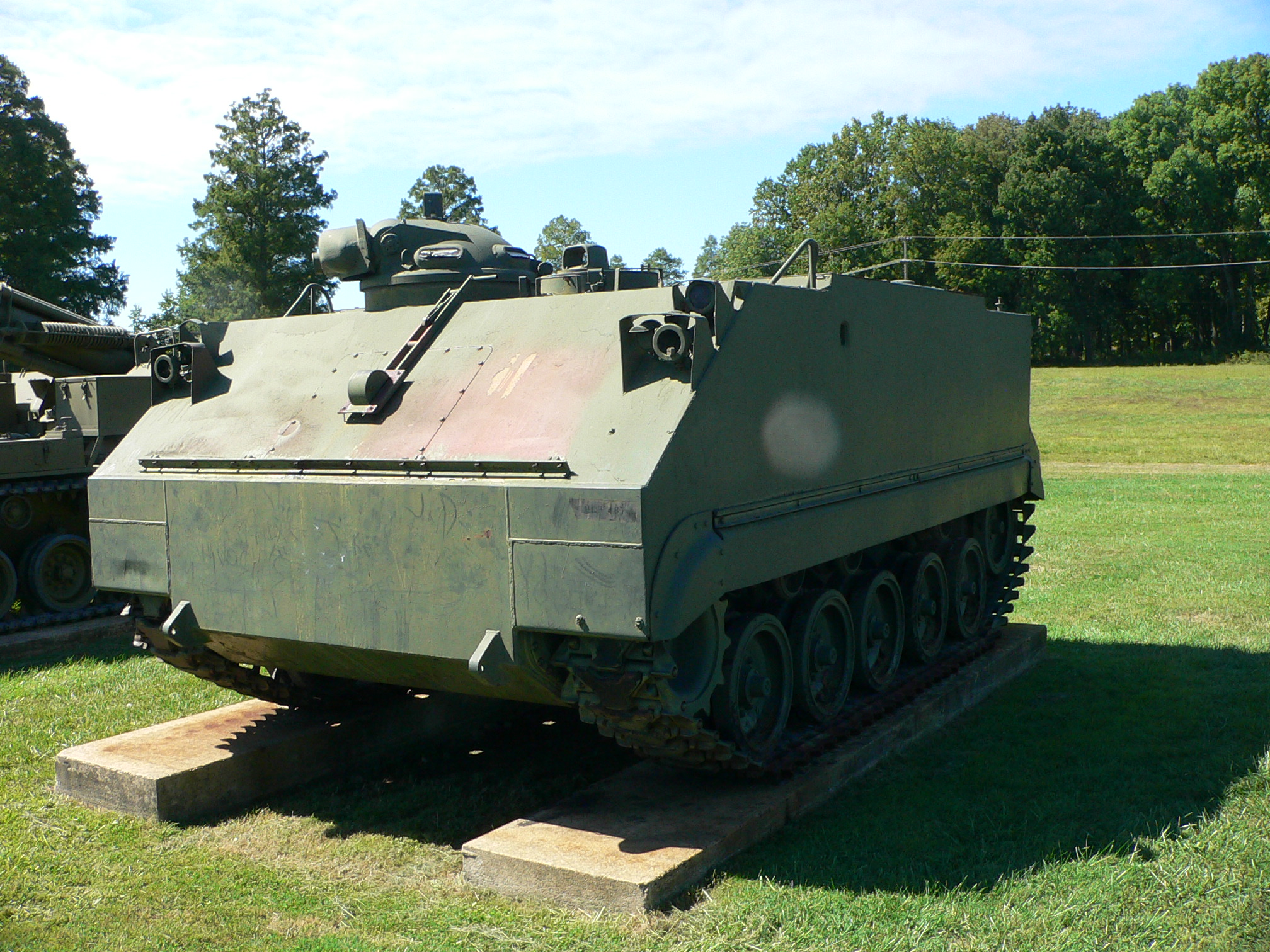
- Type: Armored personnel carrier
- Place of origin: United States

Service history
- In service: 1954 – Late 1980s US
- Wars: Vietnam War; Lebanese Civil War

Production history
- Designed: 1951
- Manufacturer: FMC Corporation
- Produced: 1953–1960
- No. built: 6,300 (approx)

Specifications
- Mass: 42,600 pounds (19,300 kg)
- Length: 220.9 in (5.61 m)
- Width: 128.3 in (3.26 m)
- Height: 109 in (2.8 m)
- Crew: 2 (commander, driver) + 10 passengers
- Armor: Welded steel between 25 mm to 9.5 mm thick
- Engine: Two GMC Model 302 six-cylinder inline gasoline engines 146 hp at 3600 rpm (per engine, combined 292 hp)
- Transmission: Hydramatic model 301MG transmission
- Suspension: torsion bar
- Fuel capacity: 135 US gallons
- Operational range: 120 mi (190 km)
- Maximum speed: Road: 32 mph (51 km/h)

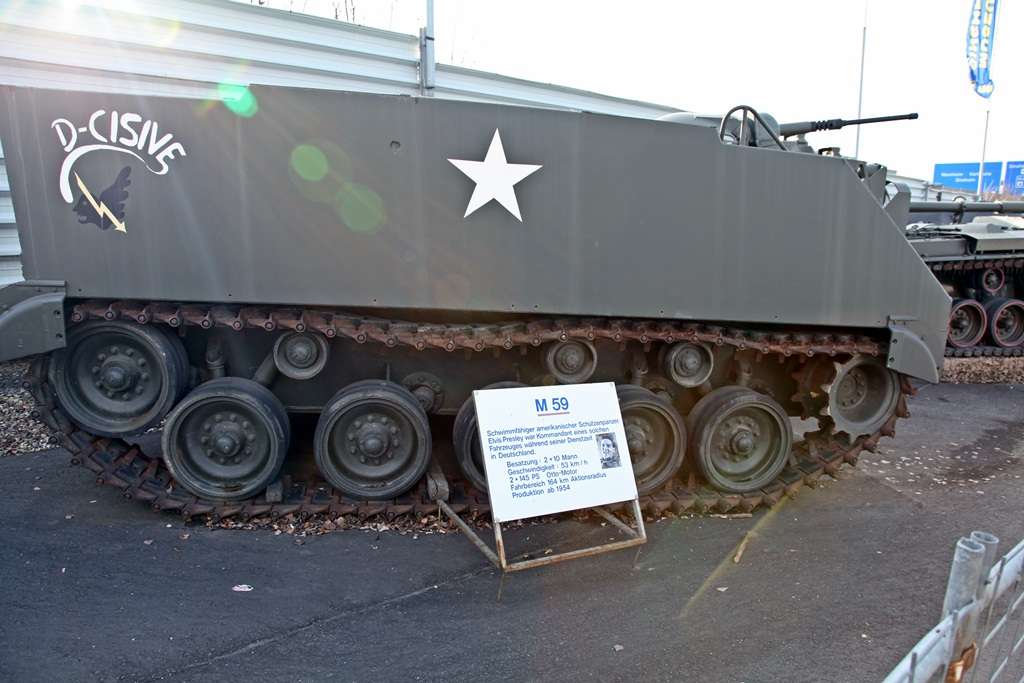
M59 APC D-cisive

The M59 was an American armored personnel carrier that entered service in the spring of 1954 replacing the M75. It had three key advantages over the M75: it was amphibious, had a lower profile, and was considerably cheaper to produce. Production ended in 1960, by which time approximately 6,300 had been built. The M84 Mortar Carrier was a derivative of the M59. The M59 was replaced in service by the M113 family of vehicles.

== Development ==
Development work on a replacement for the M75 began in late 1951, with the Food Machinery and Chemical Corporation producing a number of prototypes. The best performing of these, the T59, was selected and type classified as the M59 in May 1953. FMC was awarded the production contract.

In order to keep costs down the vehicle used two smaller less powerful civilian truck engines, instead of a single large powerful engine, one mounted in each side of the hull. The unreliability of this power system and reduced armor protection provided, were the major disadvantages of this APC compared to the M75.

== Description ==
The vehicle has a welded steel hull, ranging in thickness from 0.375 inches (0.95 cm) on the top to 1 inch (2.5 cm) thick on the belly, with the median thickness being 0.625 inches (1.59 cm). It retained the rather slab sided appearance and blunt nose of its predecessor. The drive train consists of twin GMC Model 302 6-cylinder inline gasoline engines, each developing 146 hp at 3600 rpm. Both engines were directly connected to a Hydramatic model 301MG transmission (early models used 300MG) with four forward speeds and one reverse. Steering is through controlled differential via steering levers at the drivers station.

The track is driven by a drive sprocket at the front. There are five road wheels per side, along with three return rollers. The vehicle uses torsion bar suspension and has shock absorbers on the first and last road wheel. The vehicle has a top road speed of about 32 miles per hour, considerably less than that of its M75 predecessor. 135 U.S. gallons (510 liters) of fuel could be carried, giving it a road range of approximately 120 miles (190 km). The vehicle was designed to be amphibious, with rubber seals on all hatches and doors. A trim vane is provided. In the water, it has a maximum speed of 4.3 miles per hour (6.9 km/h).

The vehicle has a single large compartment, with the driver sitting at the front left and the commander sitting to his right. The driver sits in a buttoned up position, provided with an M19 infra-red night vision periscope and several M17 periscopes. The commander has an M13 cupola with a .50-caliber M2 machine gun, for which 2,205 rounds are carried in the vehicle. Behind the commander and driver are two benches, which run down the sides of the vehicle for the ten passengers. The benches can be folded up to make room for a single jeep. On either side of the passenger compartment are side sponsons, which contain the vehicle's drive train. The passengers are provided with a ramp at the rear of the vehicle, which has an escape door set into it. Hatches on the top of the vehicle are also provided.

=== M84 mortar carrier ===
The M84 was a modified M59 that carried a 4.2-inch M30 mortar pointing backwards attached to the floor in the bay. Roof plates on the M84 could be opened to allow the mortar to be fired from inside the vehicle. The M84 only carried a crew of six, but weighed 47,100 pounds (21,400 kg) because of the mortar and the combat load of 88 rounds. The M84 entered production in January 1957. It was replaced by the M106 mortar carrier.

=== LVT-6 Landing Vehicle, Tracked ===
A few M59s were given better hydrodynamic lines and designated LVT-6 for a US Marine Corps requirement, but they lost in competition to the LVTP-5.

== Operators ==
- United States – 6,300; retired.
- Brazil – 500; retired.
- Ethiopia – 120
- Greece – 200
- Lebanon – 16, passed on to the Lebanese Arab Army in 1976; retired in 1978.
- South Vietnam – 866
- Turkey – 1,550
- Venezuela – 15 served in the Venezuelan Air Force, some authors said that 45 more served in the Venezuelan Army; retired in 1972.
- Yugoslavia – 12 purchased for evaluation and examining. Served as an example for the development of the Yugoslav OT M 60

== See also ==
- List of U.S. military vehicles by supply catalog designation
- List of U.S. military vehicles by model number
