= M39 armored utility vehicle =

American artillery tractor

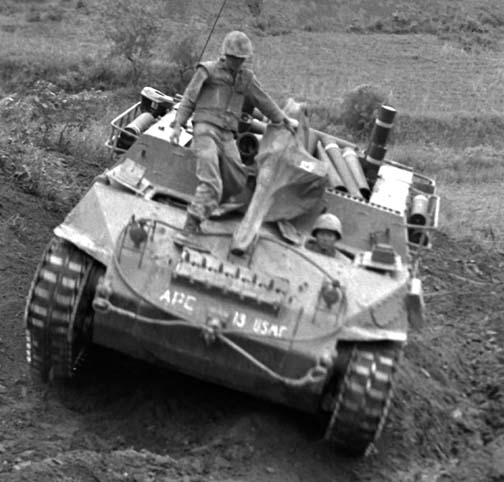
- An M-39 armored utility vehicle in the Korean War
- Type: Artillery tractor
- Place of origin: United States

Service history
- In service: 1945–1960
- Used by: United States, West Germany
- Wars: World War II; Korean War

Production history
- Designed: 1944
- Manufacturer: Buick division of General Motors
- Produced: October 1944–March 1945
- No. built: 640 converted

Specifications
- Mass: 33,450 lb (15.17 metric tons)
- Length: 17 ft 4 in (5.28 m)
- Width: 9 ft 5 in (2.87 m)
- Height: 6 ft 8 in (2.03 m)
- Crew: 3
- Armor: 4.8-12.7 mm (0.19-0.5 in)
- Main armament: .50 caliber (12.7 mm) Browning M2HB machine gun 900 rounds
- Engine: Continental R975-C4 9 cylinder radial gasoline engine, 400 hp (298 kW) at 2,400 rpm
- Power/weight: 26.37 hp/metric ton
- Transmission: 900T Torqmatic; 3 speeds forward, 1 reverse
- Suspension: Torsion bar
- Fuel capacity: 165 US gallons (625 litres)
- Operational range: 100 miles (160 km) on road
- Maximum speed: 50 mph (80 km/h) on road

The M39 armored utility vehicle (T41) is an American armored vehicle designed during the Second World War, which saw service in that conflict and in the Korean War. Like a number of vehicles of this type, it was built using an existing chassis, that of the M18 Hellcat.

== History ==
=== Development and World War II ===
In March 1944, the United States Army Ordnance Department authorized the conversion of two M18 tank destroyers as prime movers for the 3-inch Gun M5 on Carriage M6, a towed antitank gun used by tank destroyer battalions, and armored command and reconnaissance vehicles. The vehicles were respectively designated the T41 and T41E1. Tests were "highly successful," but the Ordnance Department decided that the configuration of the T41E1, which allowed for easy conversion between a prime mover or command vehicle, would suit the needs of the program, so work on the T41 was stopped; when equipped as a prime mover or command vehicle, the vehicles would still respectively be referred to as T41 or T41E1, however.

The T41 was equipped with an SCR-610 radio and stowage space for 42 rounds of 3-inch ammunition. It had a crew of two, and could seat up to eight passengers. The T41E1 had an SCR-506 or SCR-608 radio in addition to the SCR-610, with an auxiliary generator. It could carry up to seven passengers. A bazooka and three antitank mines were provided for self-defense in the reconnaissance role. On 26 June 1944, the Ordnance Committee approved the production of 650 T41 prime movers from early M18 Hellcat tank destroyers that had been returned under Ordnance directive to the Buick factory that March to fix problems with their transmission gear ratios, as well as incorporate the latest modifications. In November 1944, the number of T41s to be produced was reduced to 640 and the design was standardized as the armored utility vehicle M39. Ten additional T41s were converted to T41E1 configuration for testing at the request of the European Theater, but the T41E1 was never standardized. Both variants saw limited service beginning in April 1945, immediately before the end of World War II in Europe, in particular because the 3-inch gun had begun to be phased out of service in early 1945 in favor of self-propelled tank destroyers. In March 1945, reports from Europe indicated it would be desirable to develop an armored roof for the open-topped M39.

Conversion of M39
Month	Number	Serial number	Registration number
October 1944	10	3-12	9132509-9132518
November 1944	60	13-72	9132519-9132578
December 1944	163	73-235	9132579-9132741
January 1945	150	236-385	9132742-9132891
February 1945	150	386-535	9132892-9133041
March 1945	107	536-642	9133042-9133148

=== Korean War ===
The M39 was more widely used during the Korean War, where they were employed in variety of roles, including as troop transports, armored ambulances, and ammunition carriers for 155mm M41 Gorilla self-propelled howitzers. M39s played a vital role in supplying and ferrying troops to isolated outposts during the later defensive phase of the Korean War, though their thin armor and open tops meant the crews were vulnerable to enemy fire, and the fully enclosed M75 armored personnel carrier eventually replaced it in this role.

==== Ambush in the Battle of Imjin River ====
M39s were employed as ammunition carriers in the African American 999th Armored Field Artillery Battalion, which fought in the Battle of the Imjin River, where it provided artillery support for the 1st Republic of Korea Infantry Division. During the battle, Battery B was forced to evacuate its position after neighboring units withdrew. Because the M39s carriers had .50 caliber machine guns, unlike the unit's M41 self-propelled howitzers, they led the retreating column. During the retreat, it was ambushed by Chinese forces; in the battle, the unit lost seven killed in action, two M39 armored utility vehicles, and had two M41s damaged and 31 wounded. However, the unit broke through the ambush, inflicting an estimated 100 casualties on the ambushing forces, and promptly resumed providing artillery support afterwards.

The M39 was declared obsolete in U.S. service in 1957.

=== Cold War ===
==== Use in the Bundeswehr ====
In 1956, the United States offered 100 M39s to the West German Bundeswehr. Only 32 were put into service, and they were assigned to the Panzergrenadier-Lehrbataillon in Munster. After four years of service, they were replaced in 1960 by the Schützenpanzer Lang HS.30 due to a shortage of spare parts.

== Gallery ==
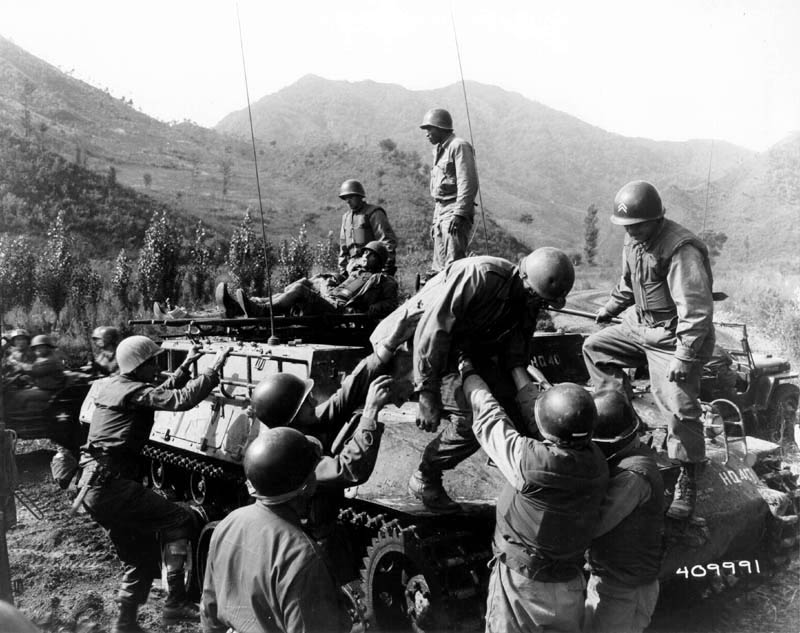
Medical corpsmen assist in helping wounded infantrymen down from an M39 armored utility vehicle

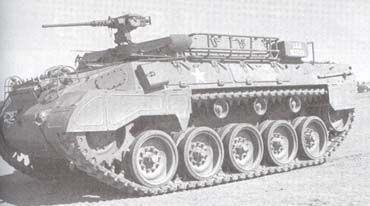
M39 armored utility vehicle

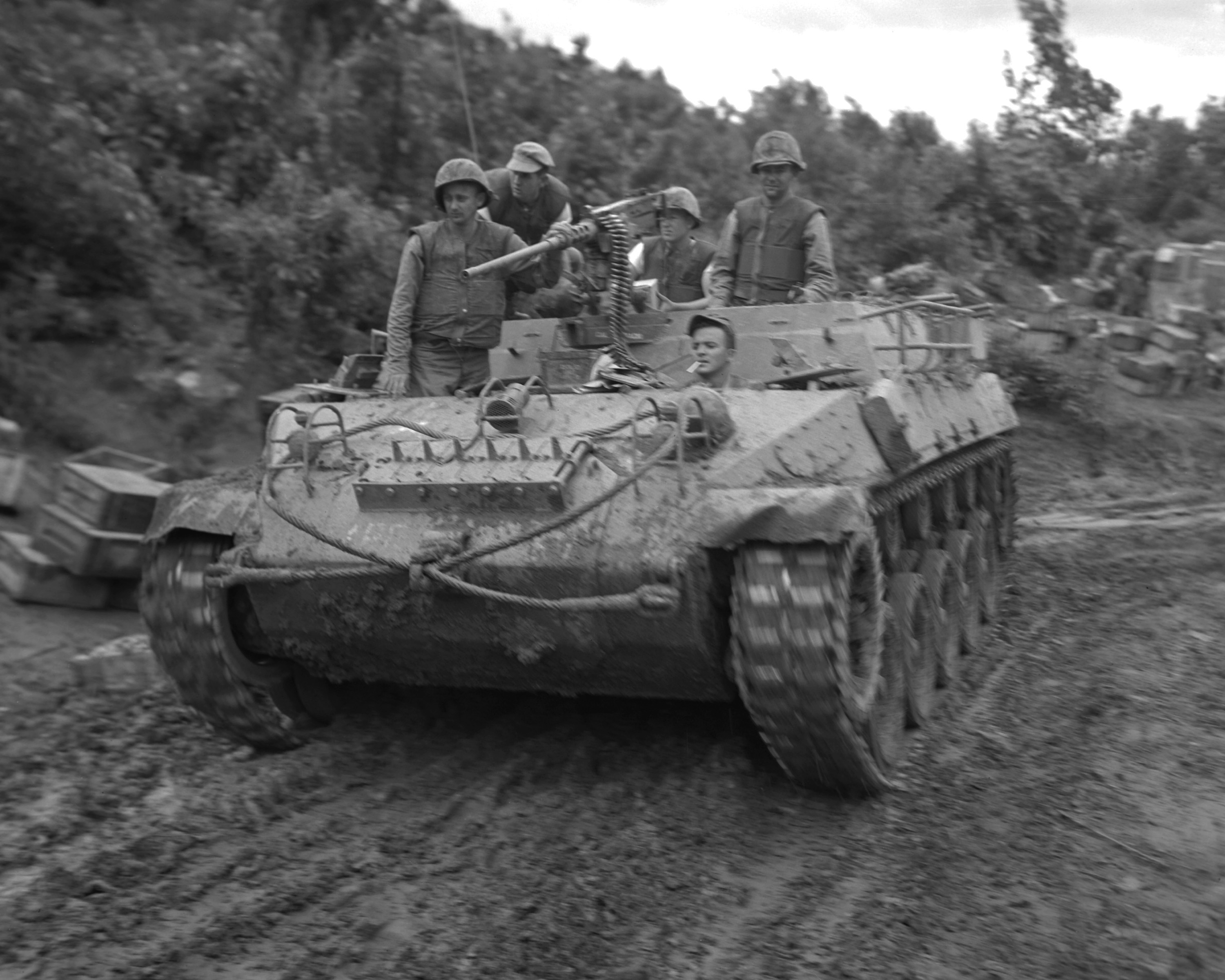
A U.S. Army M39 assists U.S. Marines picking up casualties on 25 July 1953 during an attack against Hill 111, also known as "Boulder City", during the Battle of the Samichon River during the Korean War

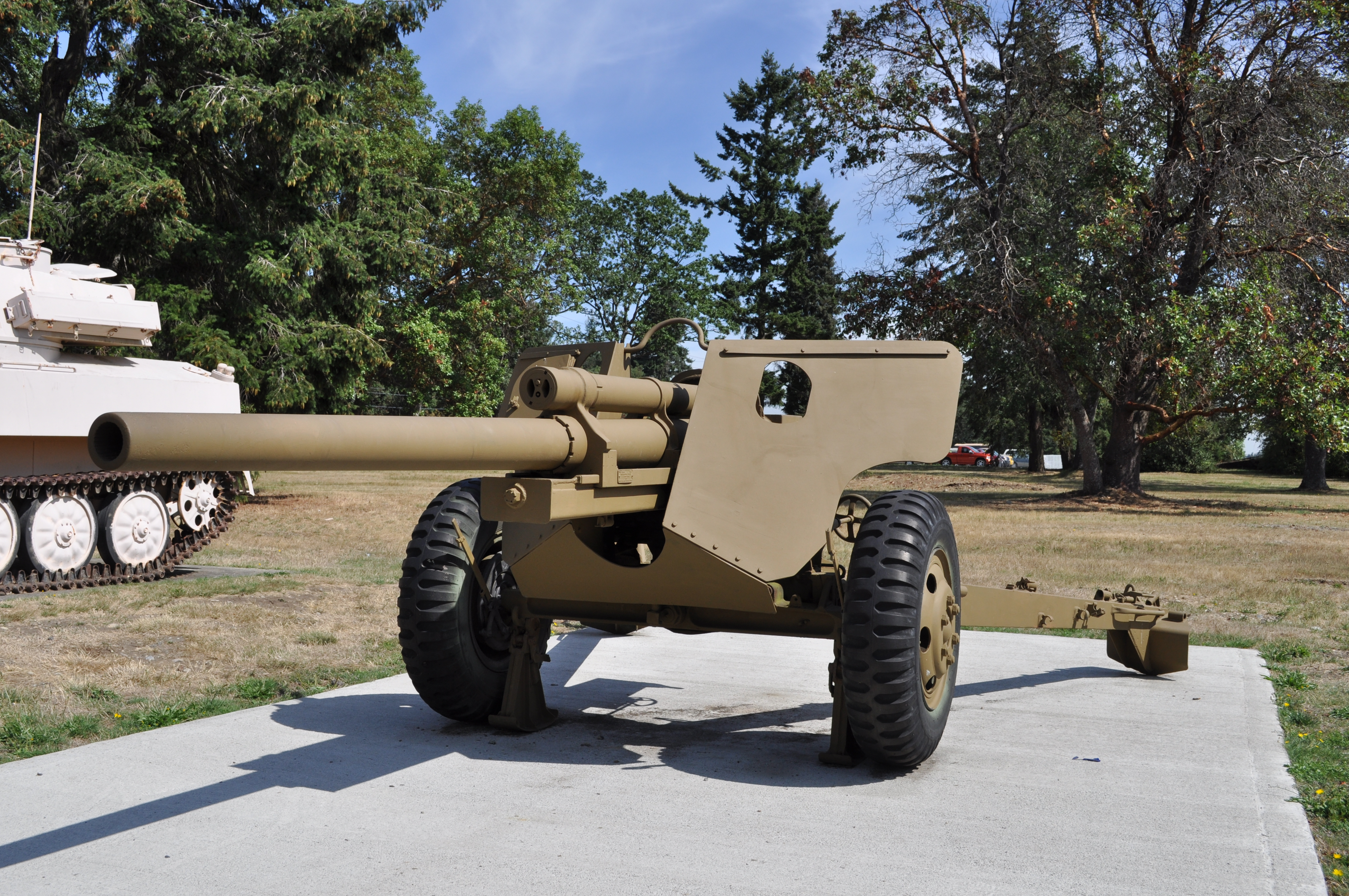
An M5 3-inch antitank gun

== See also ==
- List of U.S. military vehicles by model number
- List of U.S. military vehicles by supply catalog designation
- List of U.S. Army weapons by supply catalog designation
- 3 inch Gun M5
