= 643rd Tank Destroyer Battalion =

Tank destroyer battalion

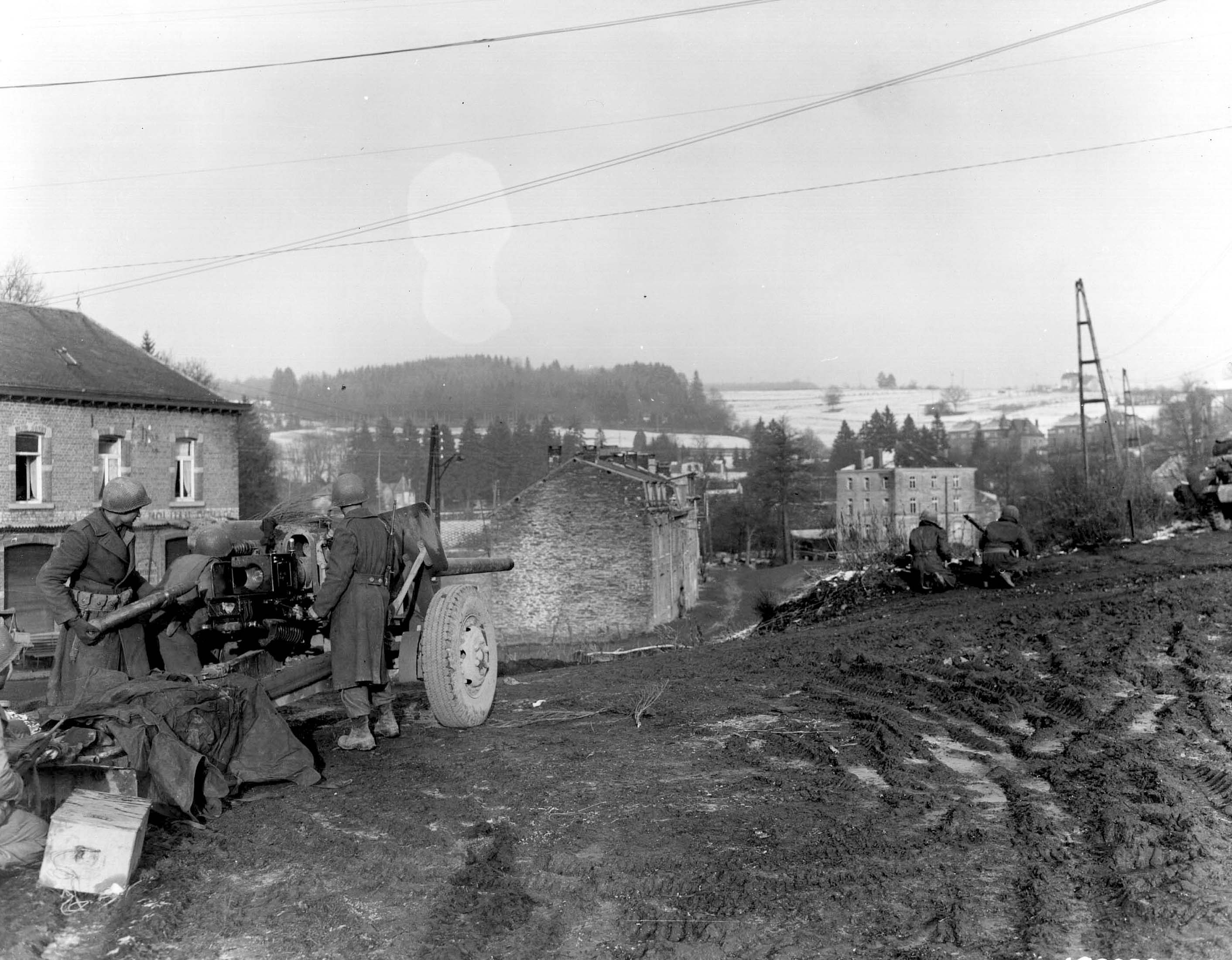
- 3" anti-tank gun, possibly of the 643rd Battalion, guarding a crossroads in the Ardennes on 22 December 1944
- Active: 1941–1945
- Disbanded: 1945
- Country: United States
- Branch: Army
- Part of: Independent unit
- Equipment: 3" anti-tank guns M18 Hellcat
- Campaigns: World War II: Rhineland; Ardennes-Alsace; Central Europe

The 643rd Tank Destroyer Battalion was a tank destroyer battalion of the United States Army active during the Second World War.

The battalion was activated at Camp Blanding on 15 December 1941, in line with the reorganisation of the anti-tank force, by redesignating the Provisional Antitank Battalion of the 43rd Infantry Division. It was later organized as a towed battalion, equipped with towed 3" anti-tank guns.

The 643rd deployed into Normandy exactly three years after it was activated, landing at Cherbourg on 15 September 1944. The following day, a major German offensive was launched in the Ardennes forest, beginning the Battle of the Bulge, and the battalion was rushed into action, arriving at the front on 22 December. One company was deployed that same evening to support an attack on Hotton by elements of Combat Command Reserve of the 3rd Armored Division. The battalion remained attached to the 3rd Armoured until 26 December, supporting it in a number of small-scale engagements.

The battalion was later briefly attached to the 82nd Airborne Division before being assigned to the 83rd Infantry Division on 2 February; it would serve with them for the remainder of the war After being re-equipped with M18 Hellcat tank destroyers in March, it pushed into central Germany with the 83rd, crossing the Elbe river before being withdrawn to take up occupation duties in the Harz Mountains at the end of the war.

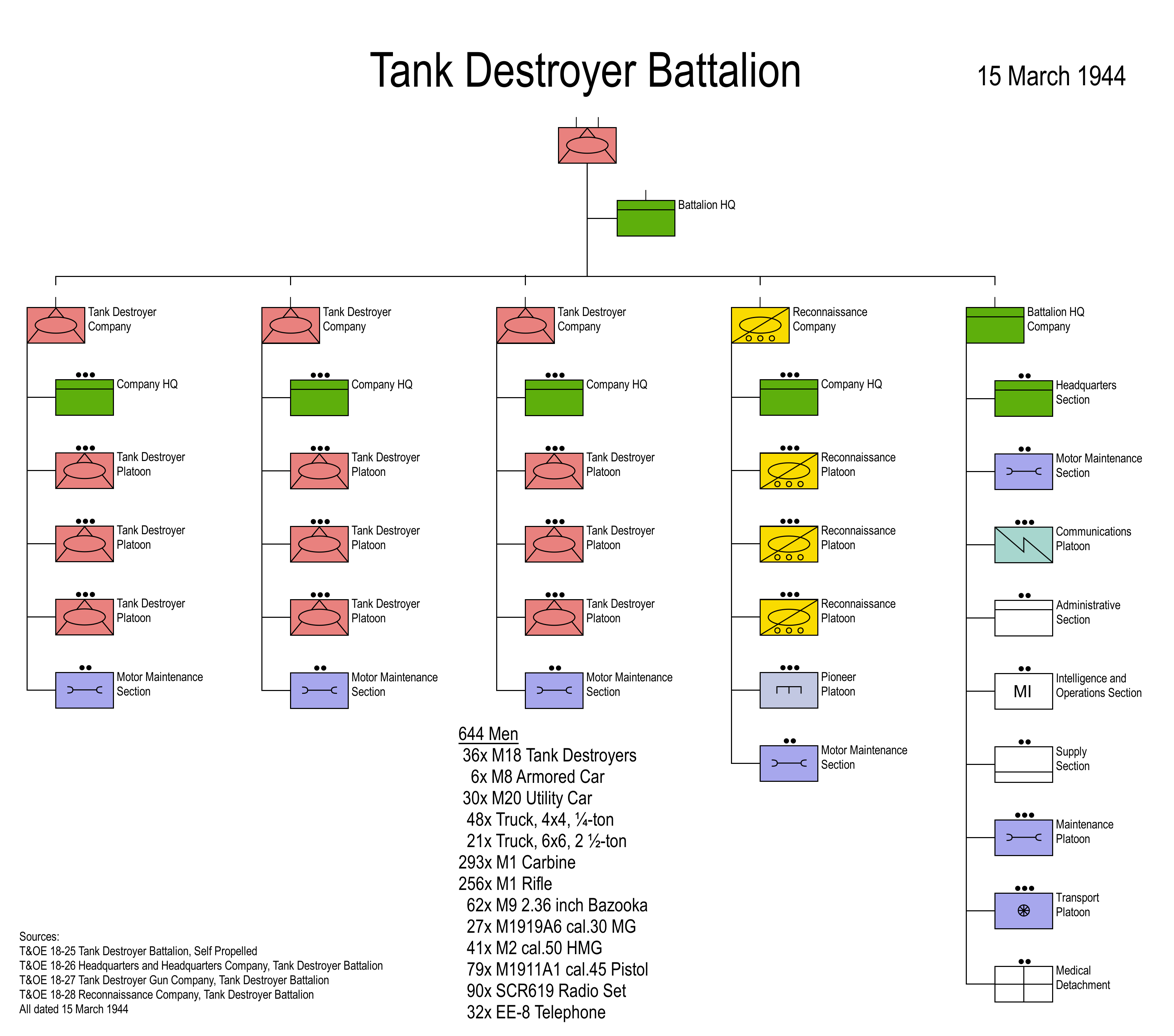
Tank Destroyer Battalion (SP) Structure - March 1944
