= 602nd Tank Destroyer Battalion =

- Active: 15 December 1941 – 1945
- Disbanded: 1945
- Country: United States
- Allegiance: United States Army
- Equipment: M10 tank destroyer M18 Hellcat
- Engagements: World War II

The 602nd Tank Destroyer Battalion was a tank destroyer battalion of the United States Army active during the Second World War.

The battalion was formed in March 1941 as the 2nd Infantry Division Provisional Antitank Battalion, and on 15 December, was redesignated as the 602nd Tank Destroyer Battalion, in line with the reorganisation of the anti-tank force. It remained in the United States until 1944, when it was moved to the United Kingdom, deploying into Normandy in late August equipped with M18 Hellcats.

It first saw combat on 9 September, fighting along the Moselle in the Lorraine Campaign and participating in the capture of Metz in November with the 26th Infantry Division. During the Battle of the Bulge in December it was sent north to Belgium to help stabilise the line, arriving near Bastogne on 21 December, and fought in the counterattack in January 1945 as part of the 11th Armored Division. Company C of the battalion was awarded the Distinguished Unit Citation for its role in clearing the Harlange Pocket.

After participating in the offensive through the Siegfried Line, the battalion was returned to the southern sector in March, and attached to the 89th Infantry Division on the 15th. It crossed the Rhine on the 26th, and advanced into Germany. On the 4 April, elements of Company A were the first to enter Ohrdruf, the first concentration camp to be liberated by American forces.

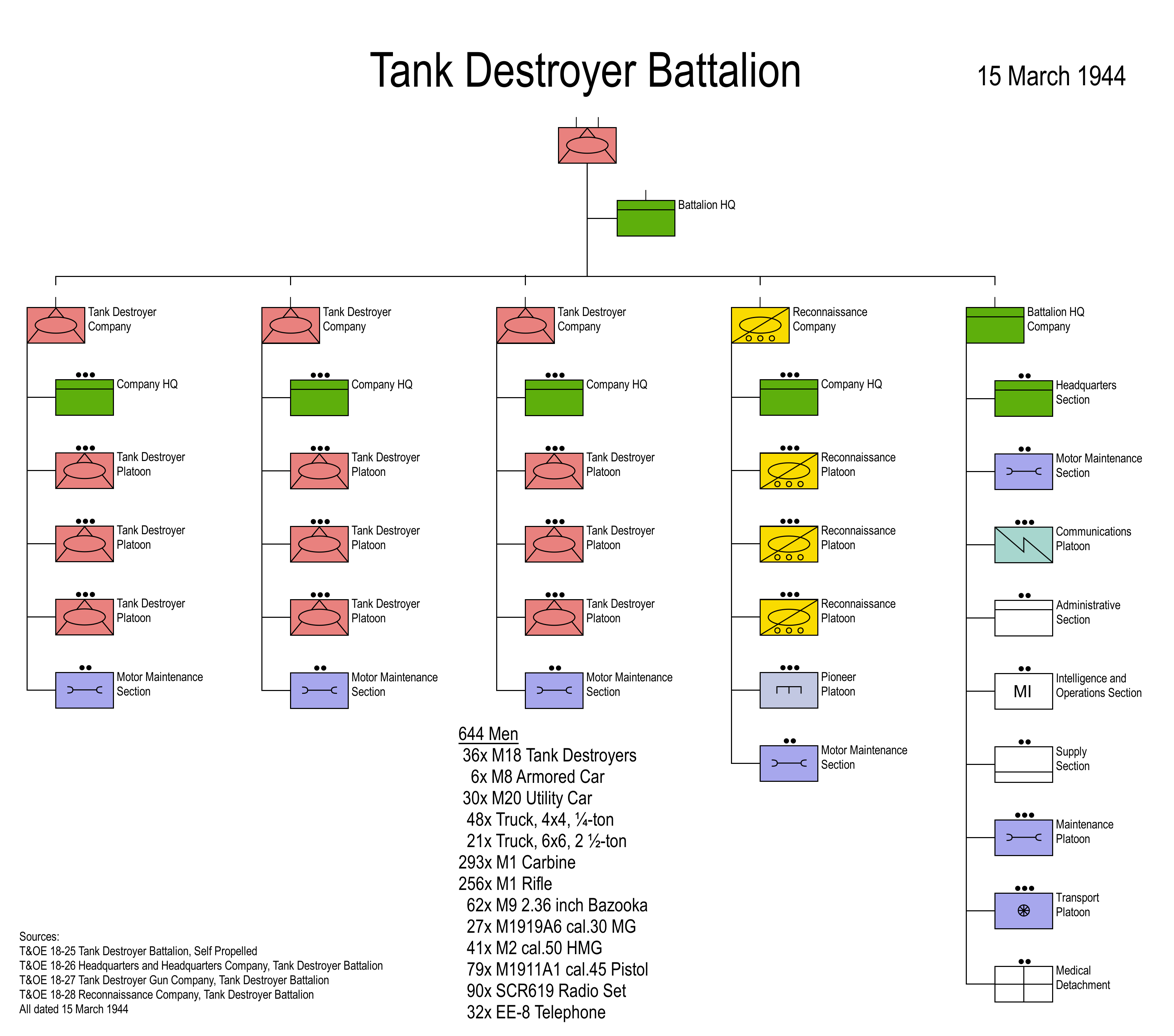
Tank Destroyer Battalion (SP) Structure - March 1944

== Bibliography ==
- Yeide, Harry (2007). The tank killers: a history of America's World War II tank destroyer force. Casemate. ISBN 978-1-932033-80-9.
- Gill, Lonnie (1992). Tank Destroyer Forces, WWII. Turner Publishing Company. ISBN 0-938021-93-1.
