= Type 64 (tank) =

Taiwanese light tank

Type 64 (Hybrid)
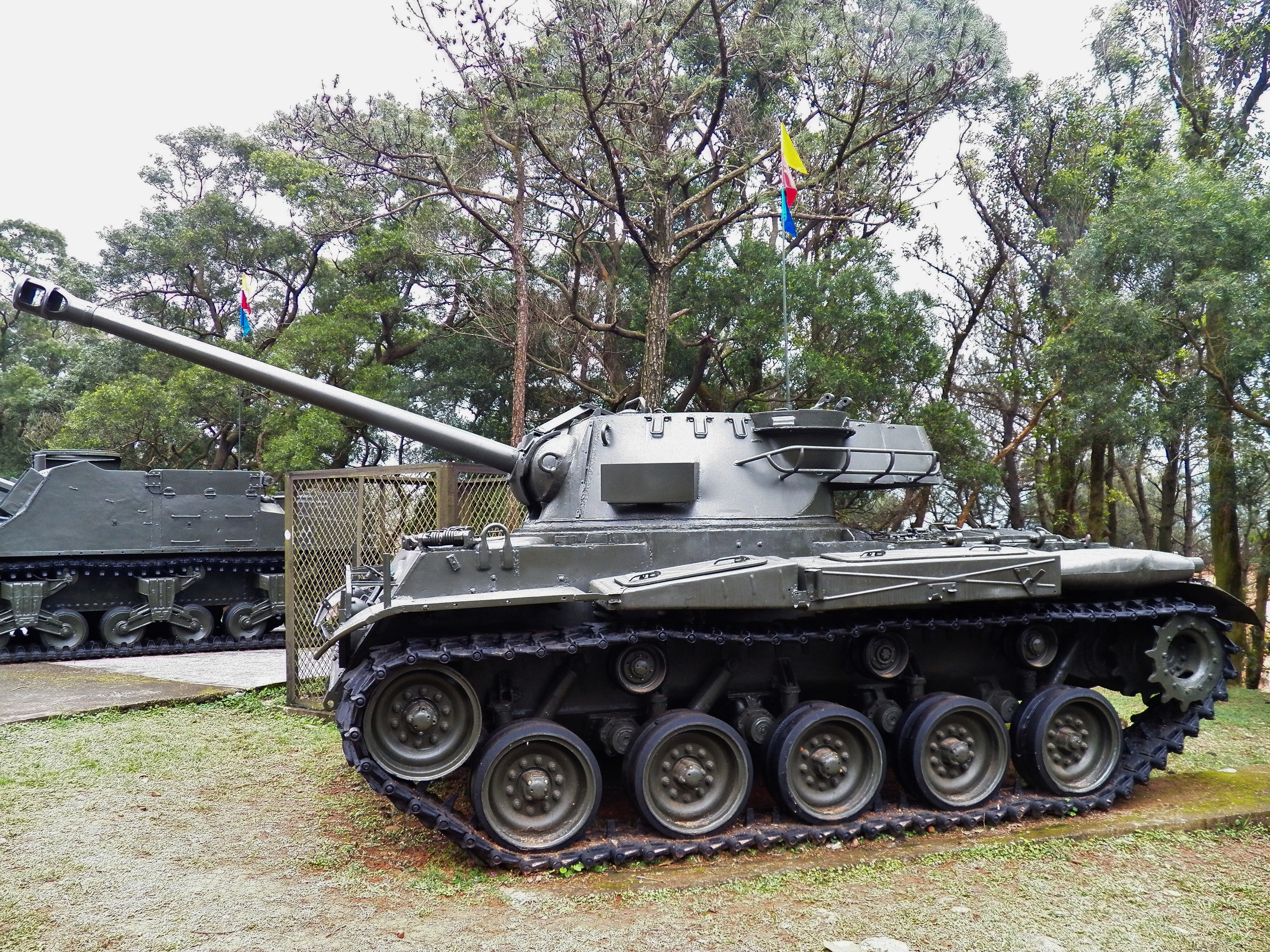
- Type 64 Light Tank
- Type: Light tank
- Place of origin: Taiwan

Service history
- In service: 1975 – 1981
- Used by: Republic of China Army; Republic of China Marine Corps

Production history
- Produced: 1975
- No. built: 50+

Specifications
- Mass: approx. 25 tons
- Length: 5.82 m (19 ft 1 in)
- Width: 3.23 m (10 ft 7 in)
- Crew: 4
- Armor: 9–76 mm
- Main armament: 76 mm gun M1
- Secondary armament: 7.62mm co-axial machinegun, .50 M2HB machinegun
- Engine: Continental AOS 895-3 6-cylinder gasoline 500 hp (373 kW)
- Suspension: torsion bar
- Maximum speed: 72km/h

The Type 64 (TL64, Chinese: 六四式) is the designation of two distinct Cold War-era light tank projects of the Republic of China Armed Forces, in service from 1975. One being a hybrid of the M42 Duster and M18 Hellcat and the other an indigenous copy of the M41 Walker Bulldog, both Type 64s were intended as a cavalry tank to complement the existing M41 light tanks and to support the heavier and more-powerful M48 Patton medium tanks already in service with the ROCA.

== Description and history ==
=== Type 64 Hybrid ===
The original Type 64 hybrid tank project involved the construction of tanks made from parts of dismantled American tanks provided by the United States. The Type 64 is essentially a M42 Duster hull with an M18 Hellcat turret on top with a 76mm gun. The M18s were originally decommissioned tanks supplied to the ROC Armed Forces during the Chinese Civil War and later, whilst the hulls were surplus M42 hulls ordered and shipped to the island of Taiwan.

Compartments over the track guards for spare Bofors gun barrels were replaced with storage boxes of the stock M41 tank. A total of one battalion worth of conversions were made.

=== Type 64 Prototype ===
The Type 64 Prototype or Type 64 Experimental was a locally upgraded version of the M41 Walker Bulldog with improved fire controls, 530 horsepower Napco 8V-71T diesel engine, ANVRC-7 radio, mounted T57 7.62mm GPMG, and applique turret armor and sideskirts made from traditional cast and high-hardness tungsten alloy steel. Development began in the year Minguo 64 (1975), hence the name.

The tank is comparable in design to the M41 series of American tanks, which already proved itself reasonably capable of holding its own against the threat of Type 59 and T-55A tanks during the Vietnam War, but has an improved electrical system. The hull had an all-welded steel construction that incorporates a high-strength alloy steel and was manufactured using advanced welding techniques, providing adequate protection from small arms and cannon fire. The all-cast turret housed three crew members and has the same layout as the M41, with modifications to suit the shorter stature of local tank crews. On the hull, an additional layer of laminated, high-strength alloy steel armour plate was welded and bolted on; this provided additional protection against HEAT and APDS projectiles.

The 76mm rifled gun used on the Type 64 was manufactured locally in Taiwan. A 7.62mm co-axial machinegun was mounted with the main gun, whilst a .50 M2 HB machinegun intended for firing upon aircraft is mounted at the commander's station. The tank had an improved fire control system, and ammunition was stored in a similar manner to the M41A2 and M41A3.

A total of 14 pre-production tanks and 25 first-series tanks were ordered to be constructed at the 201 Factory, with the last tank completed in 1979. This variant did not enter further mass-production although those already built were later modified to include laser rangefinders, ballistic computers and passive night vision equipment developed by the National Sun Yat-Sen Research Institute.

== Operators ==
- Republic of China (Taiwan): Over 50 tanks were assembled.
