= M18 Hellcat =

American tank destroyer

76 mm Gun Motor Carriage M18
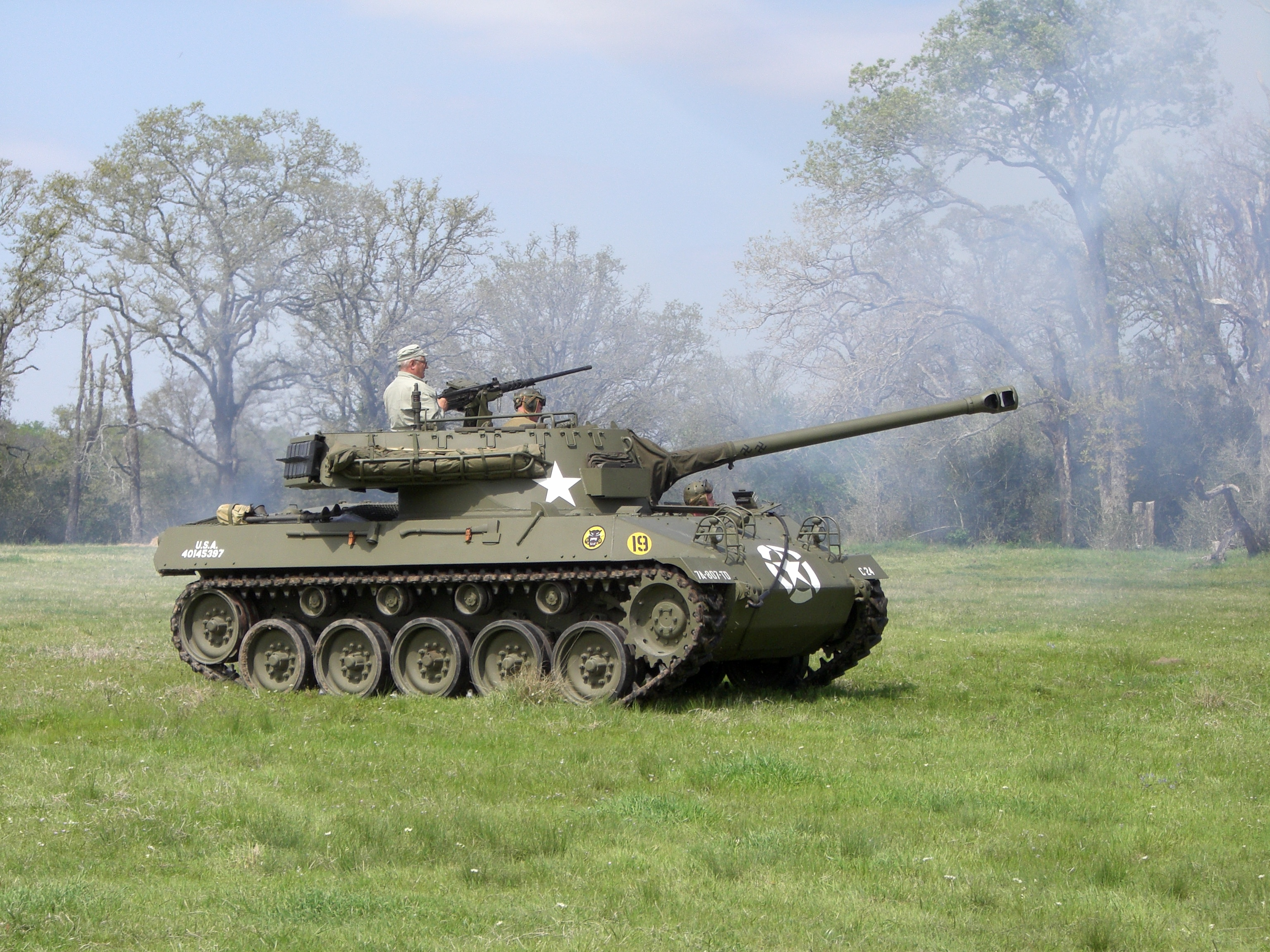
- Type: Tank destroyer
- Place of origin: United States

Service history
- In service: 1943–1945 (US)
- Wars: World War II; Korean War; Yugoslav Wars

Production history
- Designer: United States
- Designed: 1943
- Manufacturer: Buick Motor Division of General Motors
- Unit cost: US$55,230 (equivalent to $1,010,114 in 2025)
- Produced: July 1943—October 1944
- No. built: 2,507

Specifications
- Mass: 37,557 lb (16.767 long tons; 17.036 t) fighting weight, with crew
- Length: 17 ft 4 in (5.28 m) hull only; 21 ft 10 in (6.65 m) including gun barrel overhang
- Width: 9 ft 5 in (2.87 m)
- Height: 8 ft 5 in (2.57 m) over antiaircraft machine gun
- Crew: 5 (Commander, gunner, loader, driver, assistant driver)
- Armor: 4.8–25.4 mm (0.19–1.00 in)
- Main armament: 76 mm gun M1A1, M1A1C, or M1A2; 45 rounds
- Secondary armament: .50 cal (12.7 mm) Browning M2HB machine gun 800 rounds
- Engine: SN 1–1350: Continental R975-C1; 350 hp (260 kW) at 2,400 rpm SN 1351+: Continental R975-C4; 400 hp (300 kW) at 2,400 rpm
- Power/weight: 20.5–23.5 hp (15.3–17.5 kW)/tonne
- Transmission: 900T Torqmatic automatic transmission 3 speeds forward, 1 reverse
- Suspension: Torsion bar
- Fuel capacity: 165 US gal (620 L)
- Operational range: 100 mi (160 km) on road
- Maximum speed: 55 mph (89 km/h) on road; 26 mph (42 km/h) off road

The M18 Hellcat (officially designated the 76 mm Gun Motor Carriage M18 or M18 GMC) was a tank destroyer used by the United States Army in World War II and the Korean War. Despite being equipped with the same main gun as some variants of the much larger Sherman tank, the M18 attained a much higher top speed of up to 55 mph (89 km/h) by keeping armor to a minimum, and using the innovative Torqmatic automatic transmission.

The M18 Hellcat was the culmination of the development of various prototypes of fast tank destroyers dating back to 1941. Entering production in summer 1943, the M18 first saw combat service in spring 1944. The M18 served primarily in Western Europe, but was also present in smaller numbers in Italy and the Pacific. Production continued until October 1944, with 2,507 built.

The M18 was the most effective U.S. tank destroyer of World War II. It had a higher kill-to-loss ratio than any other tank or tank destroyer fielded by U.S. forces in World War II. Kills claimed were 526 in total: 498 in Europe, 17 in Italy, and 11 in the Pacific. The kills-to-losses ratio for Europe was 2.3 to 1, and the overall kill to loss ratio was 2.4 to 1. M18s were "...not primarily used for tank fighting, but were committed more often to improvised roles, usually direct fire support for infantry." Although the M18 was retired from U.S. service immediately after the end of World War II, a variant, the M39 armored utility vehicle, served in the Korean War, and M18s continued in service with some countries until 1995.

The M18 Hellcat was an example of the balancing act among firepower, armor, and mobility in armored fighting vehicle design. Despite its excellent mobility and reasonably powerful main gun, the M18 Hellcat also had drawbacks, including thin armor and a poor high explosive shell for its main gun. Historian Steven J. Zaloga characterized the overall design of the M18 as "poorly balanced" and stated that "the Hellcat's combat record is attributable to the training and dedication of its crews, not to its ill-conceived design."

== Development ==
When the Tank Destroyer Force was organized in 1941, their commander, Lieutenant Colonel (later General) Andrew Davis Bruce envisioned the units being equipped with something faster than a tank, with a better gun but less armor to allow for speed; a cruiser rather than a battleship. He objected to the 3-inch M10 gun motor carriage because it was too heavy and slow for his needs, and later on to the 90 mm M36 gun motor carriage because it was essentially an M10 with a bigger gun. The United States Ordnance Department made several failed attempts to provide such a vehicle using the weapons (the 37 mm, 57 mm, 3-inch, 75 mm and finally the lightweight 76 mm of 1942–1943) and technology available, including mounting the 3-inch gun on the fast M3 light tank chassis. The M18 was the end product of a long line of research vehicles aimed at providing the desired machine.

In December 1941, the Ordnance Department issued a requirement for the design of a fast tank destroyer using a Christie suspension, a Wright-Continental R-975 radial aircraft engine, and a 37 mm gun on the chassis of the Light Airborne Tank T9 as the 37 mm Gun Motor Carriage T42. In April 1942, the Army requested that the 37 mm gun be replaced with a 57 mm and a coil spring suspension be substituted for the Christie suspension as the 57 mm Gun Motor Carriage T49, and authorized the construction of two pilot models. The Tank Destroyer Force, meanwhile, concluded that the same 75 mm gun M3 as used on the M4 Sherman medium tank would be better for a tank destroyer. The second pilot T49 was built with the 75 mm gun in an open-topped turret as the 75 mm Gun Motor Carriage T67 and was delivered in November 1942. After testing, it was revealed that a more powerful engine was necessary, and the 76 mm gun M1A1 being developed for the M4 Sherman had also impressed the Tank Destroyer Force. The T67 project was closed in January 1943, and the Ordnance Department directed that six pilot models of the 76 mm Gun Motor Carriage T70 be built with torsion bar suspensions, more powerful engines, new turrets and minor changes to the hull front. What became the M18 originated in Harley Earl's design studio, part of the Buick Motor Division of General Motors. Previously, basic designs for other kinds of vehicles had mostly originated from within the Ordnance Department. Buick's engineers used a torsion bar suspension that provided a steady ride.

The first pilot was delivered in April 1943, and all six were completed by July. Once developed, the Hellcat was tested in the same manner as passenger cars before and after it, at the General Motors Milford Proving Ground. Although the Hellcat was "relatively mature" when it came to automotive performance, problems had to be rectified that included issues with the engine and new automatic transmission, weak front shock absorbers, and the position of the gun to provide more working space for the gunner.

Top speed testing was done on a paved, banked oval and ride quality tests were done over specially developed stretches of bumps. The M18 also required tests of its ability to ford six feet of water, climb small walls, and ram through structures. Though it weighed about 20 tons, the Hellcat was capable of traveling at 55 mph (89 km/h). Its power came from Wright R-975, a nine-cylinder, 350 to 400 hp (260 to 300 kW) radial aircraft engine, the same as that used on the M4 Sherman tank, paired to a 900T Torqmatic automatic transmission.

The first models of the tank destroyer were tested by the US Army's 704th Tank Destroyer Battalion. The unit had originally been trained on the M3 Gun Motor Carriage (a 75 mm gun installed in the bed of an M3 half-track). Despite its T70 prototypes requiring several improvements, the 704th had a "superlative" testing record, and the unit was later issued production Hellcats after many of their suggestions were integrated into the vehicle. The testing phase of the Hellcat proved that teamwork was an essential element of the new light tank destroyer units, and replaced the fixed, rigid structure of other units with a much more flexible command structure that allowed adapting to more complicated tasks.

== Design ==
The M18's new design incorporated several innovative labor-saving maintenance features. Drivetrain maintenance was performed by removing a large access plate on the front of the hull, disconnecting the drivetrain from the driveshaft, attaching extension rails to the drivetrain mounting, and sliding the entire assembly out of the hull on the rails. For access to the bottom of the engine without having to remove it completely from the hull, it was possible to slide the engine out onto a rail system integrated with the rear hull access door.

The 900T Torqmatic transmission had three forward gears, with ranges of up to 16 mph, 12 to 34 mph, and 30 to 60 mph (corresponding to cruising speeds of 12 mph, 25 mph, and 45 mph, respectively), and one reverse gear with a cruising speed of 20 mph (32 km/h). The engine speed was governed such that the vehicle normally could not exceed 55 mph (89 km/h) in third gear. The M18 carried a five-man crew, consisting of a commander, gunner, loader, driver, and assistant driver. The driver and assistant driver were seated in the front left and right of the hull, respectively. Uniquely, the driver and assistant driver were provided with identical sets of controls and either could be used to operate the vehicle, but only the driver's set of steering levers could be used as parking brakes. The commander, gunner, and loader were positioned in the turret; the commander at the left rear, the gunner at the left front, and the loader on the right. The turret crew were all provided with seats, and the commander could stand on his seat to operate the .50 caliber M2 Browning machine gun on a flexible ring mount on the left rear of the turret. An SCR-610 radio was placed in the rear of the turret. An escape hatch was provided in the hull floor directly underneath the turret.

=== Armament ===
In contrast to the M10 and M36 tank destroyers, which used the heavy chassis of the M4 Sherman, the M18 Hellcat was designed from the start to be a fast tank destroyer. As a result, it was smaller, lighter, more comfortable, and significantly faster, while carrying the same gun as the Sherman 76 mm models. The turret could rotate through 360 degrees in 24 seconds using an electro-hydraulic traverse mechanism, and the 76 mm gun could depress 10 degrees, and elevate 20 degrees. The maximum firing rate was 20 rounds per minute. The breech block of the gun was tilted 45 degrees to the right to aid the loader in manipulating and inserting ammunition in the confined space of the turret. 45 rounds of main gun ammunition were carried, 9 in the turret to the right of the gun, and 18 in each sponson. A .50 caliber M2 Browning machine gun with 800 rounds of ammunition was mounted on the left rear of the turret in a flexible ring mount. Each crew member was provided with an M1 carbine with 90 rounds for self-defense, and six Mk 2 grenades, six M50 white phosphorus smoke grenades, and six smoke pots were also carried in the vehicle.

One disadvantage of the M18 was the inconsistent performance of its 76 mm gun against the thick and steeply sloped frontal armor of later German designs such as the Tiger and Panther. The problem of the main gun performance was somewhat remedied with High Velocity Armor Piercing (HVAP) ammunition beginning in fall 1944, which allowed the 76 mm gun to achieve greater armor penetration, but this was never available in quantity. The 76 mm gun with standard ammunition could penetrate the frontal turret armor of Panther tanks only at very close ranges, whereas the HVAP ammunition gave it a possibility of effectively engaging some of the heavier German tanks and theoretically penetrating the front of the Panther turret at ranges of about 1,000 m (1,100 yd).

=== Armor ===
The armor of the M18 Hellcat was quite light to facilitate its high speed, and only provided protection from small arms fire. The lower hull armor was 12.7 mm (0.50 in) thick all around, vertical on the sides, but sloped at 35 degrees from the vertical at the lower rear and angled twice at the lower front to form a nearly rounded shape; 53 degrees from the vertical and then 24 degrees from the vertical. The hull floor was only 4.8 mm (0.19 in) thick.

The upper front hull also had an angled construction to form the Hellcat's sloping glacis; two plates were angled at 38 and 64 degrees from the vertical, respectively. The upper hull armor was also 12.7 mm (0.50 in) thick, being angled at 23 degrees from the vertical on the sides and 13 degrees from the vertical at the rear. The hull roof was 7.9 mm (0.31 in) The cast turret of the Hellcat was 25.4 mm (1.00 in) thick on the front (at a 23-degree angle from the vertical) and 12.7 mm (0.50 in) thick on the sides (also at a 23-degree angle from the vertical) and rear (angled at 9 degrees from the vertical) The front of the turret was further protected by a rounded cast gun mantlet which was 19 mm (0.75 in) thick.

Another disadvantage of the M18 was its very light armor protection and open-topped turret. In testing of the T70 for possible use as a light tank, 9 out of 30 armor-piercing .30 caliber bullets penetrated the side of the turret at a range of 75 yards (69 m). The open-topped turret—a characteristic which it shared with all American tank destroyers—left the crew exposed to snipers, grenades, and shell fragments, however it gave the crew excellent visibility, which was of importance in the killing of tanks, the intent of tank destroyers being primarily ambush weapons. The doctrinal priority of high speed at the cost of armor protection thus led to a relatively unbalanced design.

=== Tactical mobility ===
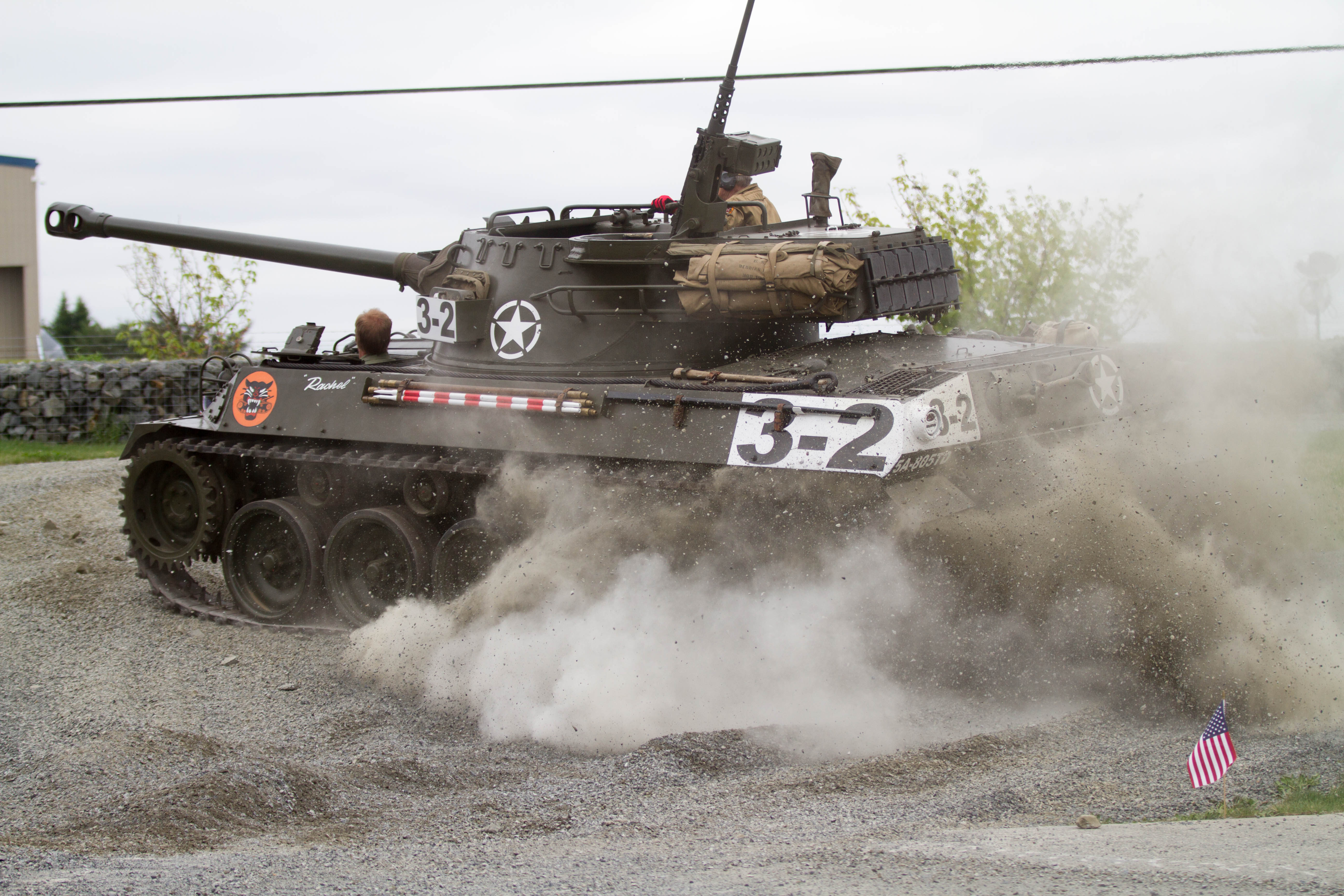
M18 Hellcat at TankFest, Bovington Tank Museum, Dorset, South West England, in 2015

While the M18 was capable of high road speeds, this attribute was difficult to use successfully in combat.

Although sustained travel at high speeds was hardly ever used outside of the Allied response during the Battle of the Bulge, most Hellcat crews found the higher speeds especially useful in a sprint to flank German tanks, which had relatively slow turret traverse speeds, and such maneuvering allowed the tank destroyer crew to direct a shot into the enemy's thinner side or rear armor. The open top proved an advantage in terms of allowing the TD crews significantly better visibility than their opponents, many of which were German tank destroyers that did not have revolving turrets and were handicapped by poor lateral visibility.

In general, Hellcat crews were complimentary of their vehicle's performance and capabilities but did complain that the open top created a cold interior in the Northern European winter of 1944–45. This problem was exacerbated because the air-cooled engine pulled some of its cooling air through the crew compartment, creating, in effect, a large armor-plated refrigerator; it proved impossible to seal off the crew compartment entirely from engine-induced drafts.

== Production ==
Original plans called for a total of 8,986 M18s to be supplied: 1,600 for Lend-Lease to other countries and 7,386 for the U.S. Army. The production plans of the M18 were curtailed to 2,507 vehicles, including the six pilot models. The reasons behind the reduction (in no particular order) were:

- The 76 mm gun was already inadequate for the thick and/or steeply sloped frontal armor of later German tanks and the Army Ground Forces (AGF) preferred to get the 90 mm Gun Motor Carriage M36 into service, despite Tank Destroyer Force commander Andrew Bruce's objections to adopting it
- The number of self-propelled tank destroyer battalions had been approximately halved due to a policy change forced by the AGF, who wanted towed guns to be used and hence far fewer self-propelled units were needed for the Tank Destroyers
- There was little potential Lend-Lease activity: Britain and the Soviet Union "had little interest". Two, listed as "T70", were transferred to the United Kingdom, and five to the Soviet Union.

Production of M18 Hellcats ran from July 1943 until October 1944, with 2,507 built. In March 1944, the T70 was standardized by the Ordnance Department as the 76 mm Gun Motor Carriage M18. There were three production contracts for the Hellcat: RAD-563 covered the six pilot models. T-6641 was for the first 1,000 vehicles, and T-9167 was for the final 1,507 vehicles.

Production of M18 by production contract
Model	Quantity	Contract number	Serial number	Registration number
Pilot	6	RAD-563	none assigned	40128384–40128389
M18	1,000	T-6641	1–1000	40108110–40109109
M18	1,507	T-9167	1007–2513	40144883–40146389

Monthly production of M18
Month	Quantity	Serial numbers	Registration numbers
July 1943	6	1–6	40108110–40108115
August 1943	83	7–89	40108116–40108198
September 1943	112	90–201	40108199–40108310
October 1943	150	202–351	40108311–40108460
November 1943	267	352–618	40108461–40108727
December 1943	194	619–812	40108728–40108921
January 1944 (end contract T-6641)	188	813–1000	40108922–40109109
January 1944 (begin contract T-9167)	62	1007–1068	40144883–40144944
February 1944	218	1069–1286	40144945–40145162
March 1944	170	1287–1456	40145163–40145332
April 1944	150	1457–1606	40145333–40145482
May 1944	150	1607–1756	40145483–40145632
June 1944	150	1757–1906	40145633–40145782
July 1944	150	1907–2056	40145783–40145932
August 1944	150	2057–2206	40145933–40146082
September 1944	150	2207–2356	40146083–40146232
October 1944	157	2357–2513	40146233–40146389

=== Production changes ===
The M18 experienced various changes throughout its production, both to refine the design from a mechanical standpoint and incorporate features that would enhance its combat effectiveness.

M18s with serial numbers 1–1000 and 1007–1096 (registration numbers 40108110–40109109 and 40144883–40144972) experienced problems with their transmission gear ratios. The same action that standardized the M18 directed that vehicles below serial number 685 be returned to the Buick factory for modification, and vehicles with serial numbers 685 through 1096 be modified before overseas shipment. The rest of the M18s built featured an improved transmission. 640 of the vehicles returned to Buick were eventually converted to M39 armored utility vehicles, and ten into T41E1 command and reconnaissance vehicles (see M18 Hellcat § Variants).

Hellcats with serial numbers 1350 and below (registration numbers 40108110–40109109 and 40144883–40145226) had the naturally aspirated R975-C1 engine, which produced 350 horsepower. The rectangular ventilation grate for the transmission and differential oil coolers located behind the driver's hatch initially had an angled cylinder-like shape, protruding above the line of the upper hull. Beginning in March 1944, M18s with serial numbers 1351 and above (registration numbers 40145227–40146389) had the internally modified supercharged R975-C4 engine, which produced 400 horsepower; at roughly the same time as the change in engine type, the shape of the ventilation grate was changed to be flush with the upper hull.

The model of 76 mm gun fitted to most Hellcats kicked up large amounts of dust when fired. This was enough to impede the vision of the crew, who had to wait until the muzzle blast cleared to fire accurately again. To solve this problem, a muzzle brake that directed the blast to the sides was standardized in February 1944, but a sufficient number were not produced to allow them to be incorporated onto production lines until the summer. In the interim, M18s produced in the spring of 1944 received the M1A1C gun, which was threaded to accept a muzzle brake, but was not so equipped; in October 1944, a maintenance work order was issued by the Ordnance Department to retrofit M1A1C guns with muzzle brakes, but "in the event, few...appear to have been retrofitted with the muzzle brake during the war." Beginning in June 1944, roughly the last 700 Hellcats received the M1A2 gun equipped with a muzzle brake, which also incorporated a faster rifling twist.

M18s prior to serial number 1701 (registration number 40155577) did not have any winterization equipment installed at the factory. Beginning with M18 serial number 1701, an engine oil dilution valve and provisions for a battery-powered heating unit that drew fuel from the left fuel tank in order to produce hot air for heating the back of the engine, transmission and differential and their oil coolers, the vehicle battery, and the auxiliary generator in extreme cold conditions was installed. The network of hot air tubes was installed in the factory, but the heater power (blower) and burner units, their fuel pipe and connecting air tube, and the air intake shutter to close off the engine compartment were to be installed when necessary in the field.

Beginning with M18 serial number 1858 (registration number 40145734), the original gun travel lock on the turret roof which had a swinging arm held by a fastening pin was replaced by one that had a rotating ball stud with a retaining clamp operated by a handle. In October 1944, heavier shock absorbers were introduced. Later vehicles also featured an M20 azimuth indicator next to the gunner's controls, allowing for easier performance of indirect fire missions. On late production vehicles, the towing pintle mounting was redesigned to allow it to swivel when towing a trailer over uneven ground.

== Combat use ==
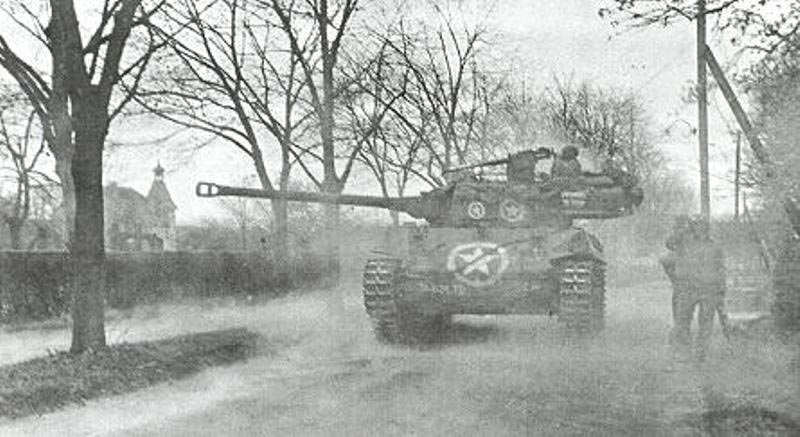
M18 Hellcat of the 824th Tank Destroyer Battalion in action at Wiesloch, Germany, April 1945

In July 1943, the AGF directed the Armored Board to consider the T70 for use as a light tank by comparing it with the existing requirements for a light tank. In January 1944, the proposal was rejected because it was felt that the T70 had insufficient armor and secondary armament.

=== European Theater ===
==== Initial combat in Italy ====
Five T70 prototypes were sent to Italy in the spring of 1944 for testing and saw combat during the breakout from the Anzio beachhead with the 601st (two) and 894th Tank Destroyer Battalions (three). The 894th employed them in the battalion's Reconnaissance Company because of their high speed. In addition to the vehicle's speed, battalion members were also impressed with the power of the 76 mm gun, but were less complimentary of the T70's thin armor and small internal volume, which they felt affected crew confidence in battle, and made living inside the vehicle and handling main gun ammunition awkward, respectively. The 805th Tank Destroyer Battalion, originally a towed gun unit, re-equipped with the M18 during the summer of 1944; it was the only battalion in the Italian campaign to be fully equipped with the M18.

==== Combat in Europe ====
In January 1944, General Omar Bradley, commander of the First U.S. Army, refused the new M18s when he was first offered them; his older tank destroyer battalions in England had been equipped with the M10 tank destroyer for some time, and he was more interested in the development of the M36 tank destroyer than he was in the M18. As a result, the three M18 battalions initially shipped to England (the 603rd, 704th, and 705th) were assigned to General George S. Patton's Third U.S. Army.

On 19 September 1944, near Arracourt, France, across the Moselle from Nancy, the 704th Tank Destroyer Battalion was attached to the 4th Armored Division. Lieutenant Edwin Leiper led an M18 platoon of Company C to Réchicourt-la-Petite, on the way to Moncourt. He saw a German tank gun muzzle appearing out of the fog 30 feet away, and deployed his platoon. In a five-minute period, five German tanks of the 113th Panzer Brigade were knocked out for the loss of one M18. The platoon continued to fire and destroyed ten more German tanks while losing another two M18s. One of the platoon's M18s commanded by Sgt. Henry R. Hartman knocked out six of the German tanks, most of which were the much-feared Panther. By the time the Battle of Arracourt ended three days later, the 704th Tank Destroyer Battalion had knocked out 39 German tanks, for the loss of four M18s destroyed and three more damaged.

The M18 Hellcat was a key element during the Battle of the Bulge. On 19–20 December, Team Desobry, a battalion-sized tank-infantry task force of the 10th Armored Division was assigned to defend Noville located north-northeast of both Foy and of Bastogne, just 4.36 mi (7.02 km) away. With just four M18 tank destroyers of the 705th Tank Destroyer Battalion to assist, the paratroopers of 1st Battalion of the 506th Parachute Infantry Regiment attacked units of the 2nd Panzer Division, whose mission was to proceed by secondary roads via Monaville (just northwest of Bastogne) to seize a key highway and capture, among other objectives, fuel dumps—for the lack of which the overall German counter-offensive faltered and failed. Worried about the threat to their left flank in Bastogne, the Americans organized a major joint arms attack to seize Noville. Team Desobry's high-speed highway journey to reach the blocking position is one of the few documented cases in which the top speed of the M18 Hellcat, 55 mph (89 km/h), was actually used to get ahead of an enemy force.

The attack of 1st Battalion and the M18 Hellcat tank destroyers of the 705th TD Battalion near Noville together destroyed at least 30 German tanks and inflicted 500 to 1,000 casualties on the attacking forces, in what amounted to a spoiling attack. A Military Channel historian credited the M18 tank destroyers with 24 kills, including several Tiger tanks, and believes that in part, their ability to "shoot and scoot" at high speed and then reappear elsewhere on the battlefield, confused and slowed the German attack, which finally stalled, leaving the Americans in control of the town overnight.

After the Battle of the Bulge, since numbers of the M36 tank destroyer were slow in arriving to the European Theater and towed tank destroyer battalions equipped with the 3-inch gun M5 had uniformly performed very poorly in the battle when compared to self-propelled units, it was decided to re-equip many of them with the "surplus" of M18s that were then in the theater, with the new M36s mostly re-equipping former M10 units.

M18 strength in the European Theatre of Operations varied from 146 in June 1944 to a high of 540 in March 1945. Losses totaled 216.

Use of M18 in European Theater
Unit	Combat debut with M18
602nd Tank Destroyer Battalion	September 1944
603rd Tank Destroyer Battalion	August 1944
609th Tank Destroyer Battalion	October 1944
612th Tank Destroyer Battalion	January 1945 (converted from towed 3-inch gun)
633rd Tank Destroyer Battalion	May 1945
638th Tank Destroyer Battalion	November 1944
643rd Tank Destroyer Battalion	March 1945 (converted from towed 3-inch gun)
656th Tank Destroyer Battalion	February 1945 (later converted to M36)
661st Tank Destroyer Battalion	February 1945
704th Tank Destroyer Battalion	July 1944
705th Tank Destroyer Battalion	August 1944
801st Tank Destroyer Battalion	April 1945 (converted from towed 3-inch gun)
807th Tank Destroyer Battalion	April 1945 (converted from towed 3-inch gun)
809th Tank Destroyer Battalion	February 1945
811th Tank Destroyer Battalion	November 1944
817th Tank Destroyer Battalion	April 1945 (converted from towed 3-inch gun)
820th Tank Destroyer Battalion	April 1945 (converted from towed 3-inch gun)
822nd Tank Destroyer Battalion	April 1945 (converted from towed 3-inch gun)
824th Tank Destroyer Battalion	March 1945 (converted from towed 3-inch gun)
827th Tank Destroyer Battalion	December 1944

==== Reception ====
The M18 was generally well received by its crews. They gave high praise to its mobility when compared to the heavier M10, such as speed and mobility in mud and snow. The speed of the turret traverse was also far faster when compared to the M10, which had a manually rotated turret. Ease of maintenance of the engine and transmission was also noted. One M18 commander said that his vehicle "operating under combat conditions and averaging 80–100 miles (130–160 km) a day during the Third Army drive from St. Lô to the German border near Strasbourg...was driven 1,870 miles (3,010 km). No repairs were necessary either to the vehicle or engine; only minimal attention was paid to moving parts...M18 engine performance was excellent under the most trying conditions and was highly thought of by all men in my and other M18 tank destroyer outfits."

Conversely, the main gun was considered inadequate against the frontal armor of later German tanks like the Tiger and Panther, especially before the introduction of HVAP ammunition. In addition, even though it could pierce more armor than the 75 mm gun M3 mounted on the M4 Sherman tank, it did not have the high explosive firepower of the former when used for infantry support missions. Muzzle blast from 76 mm guns not equipped with muzzle brakes was also a complaint. There was also a desire for an armored roof over the turret, and it was concluded that additional armor up to one ton in weight would not impair the automotive performance of the M18.

Many battalions considered the assistant driver redundant, and removed him, or stated that the vehicle should be equipped with a bow machine gun. Many crews also added additional machine guns to the turret roofs of their M18s.

=== Pacific Theater ===
M18s served in tank destroyer battalions and other units supporting US Army infantry divisions in the latter stages of the Pacific war, notably in the Philippines and Okinawa. Tank destroyer battalions equipped with the M18 that served in the Pacific Theater of Operations included the 637th, 670th, and 671st, although only the 637th saw combat, most notably participating in the Battle of Manila where it earned a Distinguished Unit Citation. During the Battle of Okinawa, General Andrew Bruce, who was by then the commander of the 77th Infantry Division, located eight M18s to re-equip the Antitank Company of the 306th Infantry Regiment. M18s were not issued to U.S. Marine Corps units.

=== Korean War ===
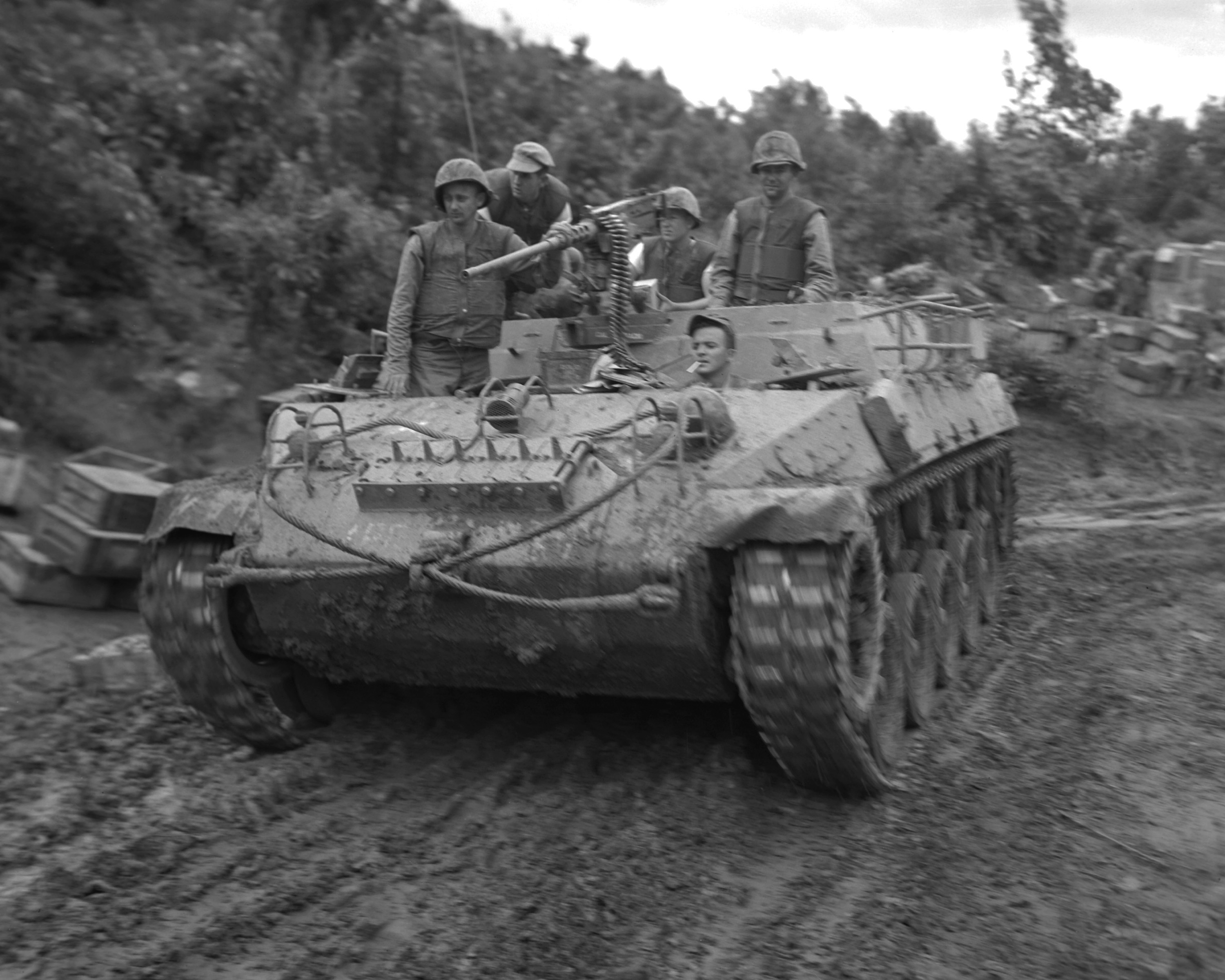
An M39 carrier used in the Korean War

The M39 armored utility vehicle, which was converted from the M18, was used as a prime mover, infantry carrier, and ammunition carrier in Korea.

== Export and legacy ==
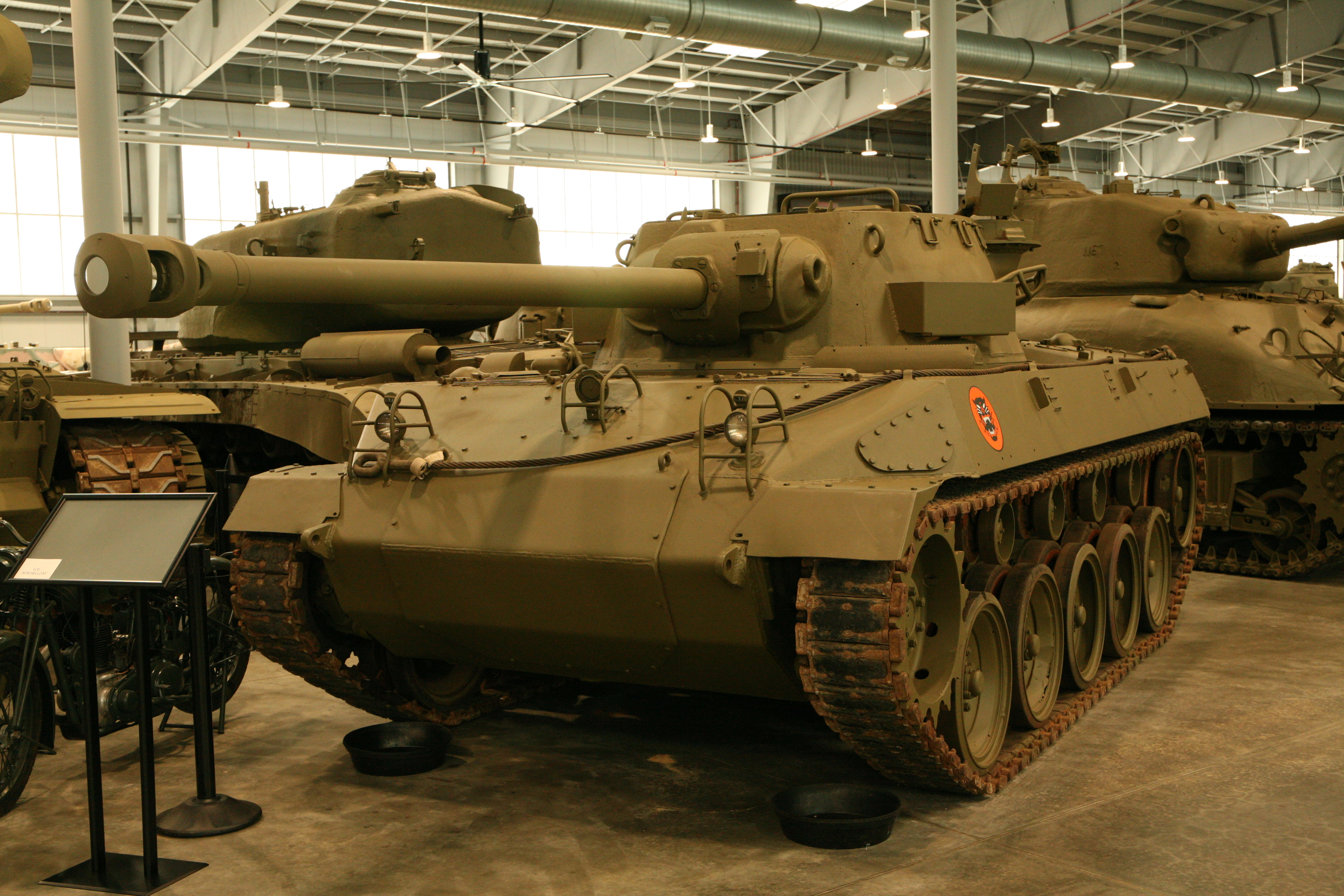
M18 Hellcat at the U.S. Army Armor and Cavalry Collection, Fort Benning, Georgia

After World War II, many M18s were sold to other countries. Many intended for European countries under the Mutual Defense Assistance Act were rebuilt and refurbished by Brown & Root in northern Italy in the late 1940s and early 1950s, and bear data plates that indicate those rebuilds. One of the users was Yugoslavia, which received 260 Hellcats during the Informbiro period and kept some of them in reserve until the early 1990s. A number of these vehicles were later used by the Serbian Army of Krajina and Army of Republika Srpska during the Yugoslav Wars. One example was used on an armored train named the "Krajina express" (Krajina Ekspres).

The Military of the Republic of China received 214 M18s, and operated them until their chassis and hulls were worn out, at which point the turrets were salvaged and installed onto surplus hulls of M42 Duster anti-aircraft vehicles to produce Type 64 light tanks.

The Greek Army received 127 M18s from 1952 to 1954. Initially, these were organized in three Tank Destroyer Regiments numbered 397, 398 and 399. In 1959 the Tank Destroyer Regiments were reorganized in three Tank Destroyer Battalions with the same numbers. Most of the M18s were retired by the end of the 1960s, but a few remained in service until the mid-1970s for training. The hulls of the M18s were dismantled and the turrets were used as gun emplacements on the northern borders of Greece and the Aegean islands. One M18 is preserved in the Greek Army Tank Museum.

Iran received 55 M18s in the 1950s.

Philippine Army received 50 units from American Stocks. Upon the outbreak of the Korean War, United Nations' request came in, the Philippines deployed 16 M4A1 Sherman tanks and one M18 Hellcat tank destroyer. This small armored force augmented the other Allied armor during the early days of the Korean conflict. The small Filipino armored force was brought in by then-2Lt. Francisco S. Tamondong, along with two noncommissioned officers, in July 1950.

The Venezuelan military operated M18s beginning in 1954, when they purchased 40. They were refurbished in 1983–1984, and at least one was heavily modernized by a Yugoslavian firm in the 1990s, but it is unclear if more conversions took place.

M18 Hellcat "Amaz N Grace" is on loan to the Museum of American Armor in Old Bethpage, New York, from the US Military Museum. An M18 is on display at the Army Heritage and Education Center in Carlisle, Pennsylvania.

== Variants ==
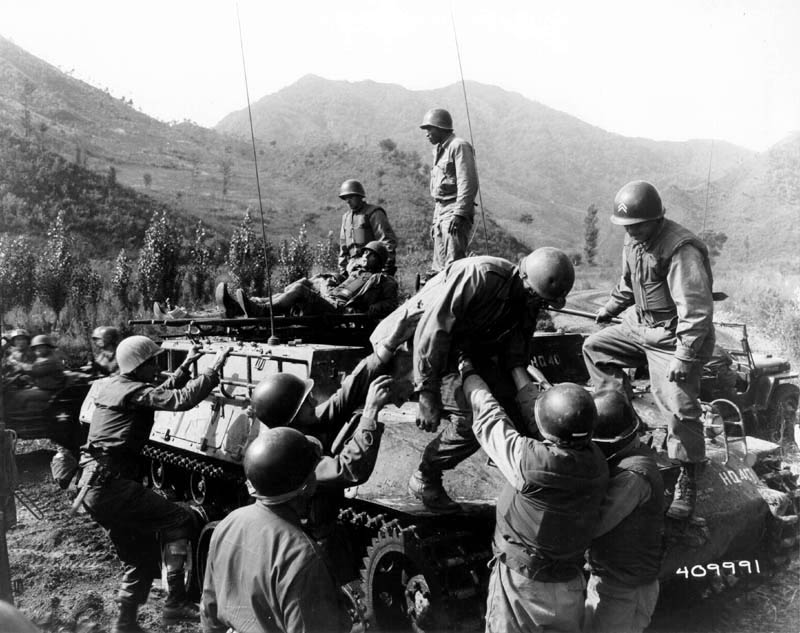
Armored utility vehicle M39 in Korea, 1952

The only M18 variant produced in significant numbers was the M39 armored utility vehicle, a turretless variation used as a gun tractor or command and reconnaissance vehicle. In March 1944, the Ordnance Department authorized the construction of two prototypes; the T41 was a prime mover for the 3-inch Gun M5, while the T41E1 was a command and reconnaissance vehicle that could also be easily converted into a prime mover. The T41E1 configuration was found superior and development of the T41 version was cancelled, although subsequently, the prime mover version of the T41E1 was referred to as the T41, and the command and reconnaissance vehicle as its original designation of T41E1.

640 of the early production M18s that had been returned to the Buick factory for modification were converted into the T41 prime mover configuration between October 1944 and March 1945 by removing the turret and fitting seats for up to eight men in the open fighting space. This version was armed with a single M2 machine gun on a flexible mount. In November 1944, it was standardized as the M39. At the request of the European Theater in early 1945, ten more of the Hellcats were modified into the T41E1 configuration for testing, although they were never standardized. M39s saw combat during the last days of World War II in Europe and during the Korean War, primarily as armored personnel and munitions carriers and were finally declared obsolete on 14 February 1957. About 100 M39s were transferred to the West German Bundeswehr in 1956, where they were used to train the reestablished Panzergrenadier armored infantry units.

A number of other variants were proposed, including a mobile command post, howitzer carrier, and flamethrower carrier. Known variants include:

- T41 prime mover: One Hellcat with its turret removed and internal changes made, converted into a prime mover for the 3-inch gun M5; project cancelled.
- T41E1 command and reconnaissance vehicle: One Hellcat with its turret removed and internal changes made, meant as a replacement for the M20 armored utility car in tank destroyer battalions. This design could be used as both a prime mover or command vehicle, and in the prime mover configuration it was redesignated T41 and standardized as the armored utility vehicle M39, with 640 converted (see above).
- 105 mm howitzer motor carriage T88: M18 with the 76 mm gun replaced with a 105 mm T12 howitzer. A pilot was built in 1944 but project cancelled after the end of the war.
- 90 mm gun motor carriage M18: M18 with the 76 mm gun replaced with a turret from an M36 tank destroyer mounting a 90 mm gun; cancelled after the end of the war.
- 76 mm gun motor carriage T86: M18 with the T7 flotation device, using its tracks for water propulsion. The T86E1 variant used propellers for propulsion.
- 105 mm howitzer motor carriage T87: The T86E1 showed that track propulsion was better and this was used for the T87, which had the same 105 mm T12 howitzer of the T88.

== See also ==
- List of U.S. military vehicles by supply catalog designation
- M36 tank destroyer
