= SS Thomas Cresap =

Liberty ship of WWII

History

United States
- Name: Thomas Cresap
- Namesake: Thomas Cresap
- Owner: War Shipping Administration (WSA)
- Operator: Isthmian Steamship Co.
- Ordered: as type (EC2-S-C1) hull, MCE hull 948
- Awarded: 30 January 1942
- Builder: Bethlehem-Fairfield Shipyard, Baltimore, Maryland
- Cost: $1,068,984
- Yard number: 2098
- Way number: 2
- Laid down: 17 January 1943
- Launched: 1 March 1943
- Sponsored by: Mrs. Logan Cresap
- Completed: 16 March 1943
- Identification: Call sign: KKMZ
- Fate: Laid up in reserve fleet, 2 May 1950, sold, 16 January 1951

United States
- Name: Sunion
- Owner: Kea SS Corp.
- Operator: Admanthos Ship Operating Co.
- Fate: Sold, May 1957

Liberia
- Name: Sunion (1957–1960); Zermatt (1960–1962)
- Owner: Kifissia Shipping Corp.
- Operator: Admanthos Ship Operating Co.
- Fate: Sold, 1962

Greece
- Name: Epiros
- Owner: Auroraship Co. Ltd.
- Operator: Auror Shipping Agency
- Fate: Sold, 1966

Liberia
- Name: Tassia J. (1966–1967); PACTRADER (1967–1968)
- Owner: Pacific Coast Shipping Co.
- Operator: Lasco Shipping Co
- Fate: Scrapped, 1968

General characteristics
- Class & type: Liberty ship; type EC2-S-C1, standard
- Tonnage: 10,865 LT DWT; 7,176 GRT
- Displacement: 3,380 long tons (3,434 t) (light); 14,245 long tons (14,474 t) (max)
- Length: 441 feet 6 inches (135 m) oa; 416 feet (127 m) pp; 427 feet (130 m) lwl
- Beam: 57 feet (17 m)
- Draft: 27 ft 9.25 in (8.4646 m)
- Installed power: 2 × Oil fired 450 °F (232 °C) boilers, operating at 220 psi (1,500 kPa); 2,500 hp (1,900 kW)
- Propulsion: 1 × triple-expansion steam engine, (manufactured by General Machinery Corp., Hamilton, Ohio); 1 × screw propeller
- Speed: 11.5 knots (21.3 km/h; 13.2 mph)
- Capacity: 562,608 cubic feet (15,931 m^{3}) (grain); 499,573 cubic feet (14,146 m^{3}) (bale)
- Complement: 38–62 USMM; 21–40 USNAG
- Armament: Varied by ship; Bow-mounted 3-inch (76 mm)/50-caliber gun; Stern-mounted 4-inch (102 mm)/50-caliber gun; 2–8 × single 20-millimeter (0.79 in) Oerlikon anti-aircraft (AA) cannons and/or, 2–8 × 37-millimeter (1.46 in) M1 AA guns

SS Thomas Cresap was a Liberty ship built in the United States during World War II. She was named after Thomas Cresap, was an English-born settler and trader in the states of Maryland and Pennsylvania. Cresap served Lord Baltimore as an agent in the Maryland–Pennsylvania boundary dispute that became known as Cresap's War. Improved a Native American path to the Ohio Valley with the Native American chief Nemacolin. After settling and became a large landowner near Cumberland, Maryland, he was involved in further disputes near Brownsville, Pennsylvania, including the French and Indian War and Lord Dunmore's War.

== Construction ==
Thomas Cresap was laid down on 17 January 1943, under a Maritime Commission (MARCOM) contract, MCE hull 948, by the Bethlehem-Fairfield Shipyard, Baltimore, Maryland; she was sponsored by Mrs. Logan Cresap, and launched on 1 March 1943.

== History ==
She was allocated to the Isthmian Steamship Co., on 16 March 1943.

On 2 May 1950, she was laid up in the Beaumont Reserve Fleet, in Beaumont, Texas. On 16 January 1951, she was sold to Kea SS Corp., and renamed Sunion. In 1959, she was lengthened to 511.5 ft (155.9 m) (8,578 grt (24,290 m^{3})), in Tokyo. She was sold in May 1957, and reflagged in Liberia. In 1960, she was renamed Zermatt, in 1962, Epiros, in 1966, Tassia J., and in 1967, Pactrader. She was scrapped in Sakaide, Japan, in December 1968.

== Bibliography ==
- "Bethlehem-Fairfield, Baltimore MD". www.ShipbuildingHistory.com. 7 August 2021.
- Maritime Administration. "Thomas Cresap". Ship History Database Vessel Status Card. U.S. Department of Transportation, Maritime Administration.
- Davies, James (May 2004). "Specifications (As-Built)" (PDF). p. 23.
- "SS Thomas Cresap".
- Sawyer, L.A.; Mitchell, W.H. (1985). The Liberty Ships. Bury St. Edmunds, Suffolk, Great Britain: St. Edmundsbury Press Ltd. ISBN 1850440492.
