= 103rd Infantry Division (United States) =

- 103rd Infantry Division shoulder sleeve insignia.
- Active: 24 June 1921–10 September 1945; 7 May 1947–31 December 1965; 31 December 1965–30 September 1977 (103d Supt. Bge.); 30 September 1977–16 September 1993 (103d Corps Support Cmd.); 14 February 2006–present (103d Expeditionary Sust. Cmd.)
- Country: United States
- Branch: United States Army
- Type: Infantry
- Size: Division
- Nickname: "Cactus Division" (Special Designation)
- Engagements: World War II; Rhineland; Ardennes-Alsace; Central Europe

Commanders
- Notable commanders: Anthony McAuliffe; Hanford MacNider; George H. Olmsted

Insignia
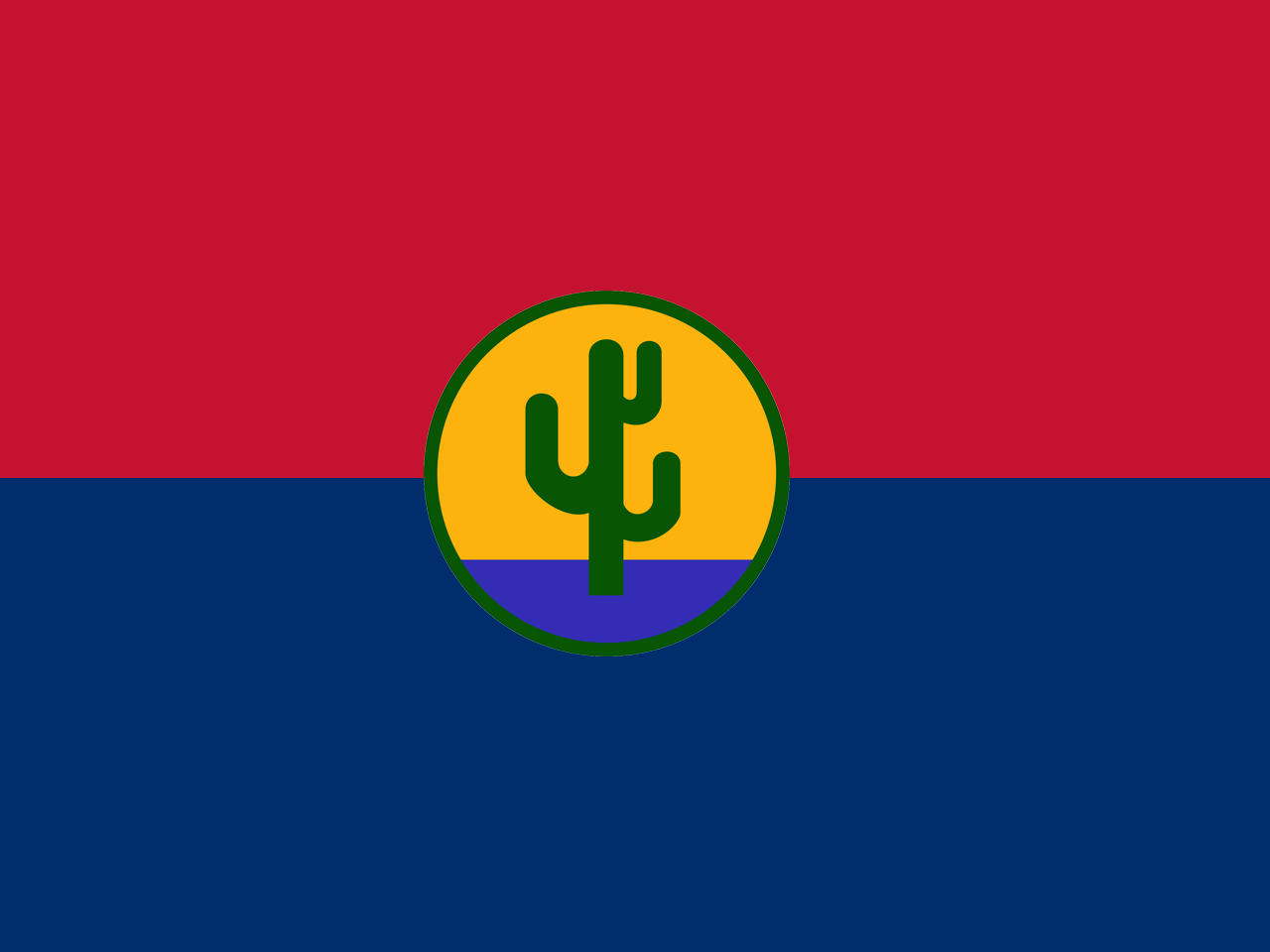
- Flag of the United States Army 103rd Infantry Division

The 103rd Infantry Division ("Cactus Division") was a unit of the United States Army that served in the U.S. Seventh Army of the 6th Army Group during World War II.

It was variously assigned to the VI Corps, XV Corps, and XXI Corps. By war's end it was part of VI Corps' dash across Bavaria into the Alps, reaching Innsbruck, Austria, taking the Brenner Pass, and earning the honor of linking up with the United States Fifth Army coming north from Vipiteno, Italy, joining the Italian and Western European fronts on 4 May 1945.

== History ==
=== Interwar period ===
The 103rd Division was constituted in the Organized Reserve on 24 June 1921, allotted to the Eighth Corps Area, and assigned to the XVIII Corps. The division was further allotted to the states of Arizona, Colorado, and New Mexico as its home area. The division headquarters was organized on 31 August 1921, at the State Capitol in Denver. The headquarters was moved on 29 March 1922 to the Kittredge Building at 16th Street and Glenarm Place in Denver and remained there until activated for World War II. To encourage esprit de corps, in 1922 the division’s officers adopted the nickname “Rocky Mountain Division” after the majestic mountain range that defined much of the division’s home area. However, this nickname soon gave way to the moniker “Cactus Division” after the unit’s shoulder patch. To maintain communications with the officers of the division, the division staff published a newsletter appropriately titled “The Cactus.” The newsletter informed the division’s members of such things as when and where the inactive training sessions were to be held, what the division’s summer training quotas were, where the camps were to be held, and which units would be assigned to help conduct the Citizens Military Training Camps (CMTC).

The large geographical area of the division made it difficult to bring subordinate units of the division together for virtually any training events except for those units in Denver; the division headquarters, special troops, 206th Infantry Brigade (less one regiment), 176th Field Artillery Brigade (less one regiment), and a few other assorted units were located in that city. Inactive training period activities of the division were generally conducted at the local level near concentrations of division personnel. One event that turned out large numbers of the Denver members of the division was the Memorial Day parade held in that city each year. The subordinate infantry regiments of the division held their summer training with the 25th Infantry Regiment at Fort Huachuca and Camp Stephen D. Little, Arizona, and with the 1st Battalion, 38th Infantry Regiment. at Fort Logan, Colorado. Other units, such as the special troops, artillery, engineers, aviation, medical, and quartermaster, trained at various posts in the Eighth Corps Area. For example, the division’s artillery regiments trained at Fort Bliss, Texas, with the 82nd Field Artillery, or at Fort Francis E. Warren, Wyoming, with the 2nd Battalion, 76th Field Artillery; the 328th Engineer Regiment trained with the 2nd Engineers at Fort Sam Houston, Texas, and later at Fort Logan; the 320th Medical Regiment trained at Fort Sam Houston with the 2nd Medical Regiment; and the 328th Observation Squadron trained at Brooks Field and some years at Fort Bliss.

On a number of occasions, the division participated in Eighth Corps Area and Third Army command post exercises (CPXs) in conjunction with other Regular Army, National Guard, and Organized Reserve units. These training events gave division staff officers’ opportunities to practice the roles they would be expected to perform in the event the division was mobilized. Unlike the Regular and Guard units in the Eighth Corps Area, however, the 103rd Division did not participate in the various Eighth Corps Area Maneuvers and the Third Army maneuvers of 1938, 1940, and 1941 as an organized unit due to lack of enlisted personnel and equipment. Instead, the officers and a few enlisted reservists were assigned to Regular and Guard units to fill vacant slots and bring the units up to war strength for the exercises. Additionally, some officers were assigned duties as umpires or as support personnel. However, for each maneuver, the division maximized the number of participants. For example, for the 1938 maneuvers at Fort Francis E. Warren, Fort Bliss, and Fort Huachuca, the 103rd Division provided 228 officers to Regular Army units and 53 to units of the National Guard's 45th Division. Similar numbers participated in the two succeeding Army maneuvers.

=== World War II ===
Before Organized Reserve infantry divisions were ordered into active military service, they were reorganized on paper as "triangular" divisions under the 1940 tables of organization. The headquarters companies of the two infantry brigades were consolidated into the division's cavalry reconnaissance troop, and one infantry regiment was removed by inactivation. The field artillery brigade headquarters and headquarters battery became the headquarters and headquarters battery of the division artillery. Its three field artillery regiments were reorganized into four battalions; one battalion was taken from each of the two 75 mm gun regiments to form two 105 mm howitzer battalions, the brigade's ammunition train was reorganized as the third 105 mm howitzer battalion, and the 155 mm howitzer battalion was formed from the 155 mm howitzer regiment. The engineer, medical, and quartermaster regiments were reorganized into battalions. In 1942, divisional quartermaster battalions were split into ordnance light maintenance companies and quartermaster companies, and the division's headquarters and military police company, which had previously been a combined unit, was split.

==== Division organization ====
The 103rd Infantry Division was ordered into active military service on 15 November 1942 at Camp Claiborne, Louisiana. The officer and enlisted cadre came from the 85th Infantry Division at Camp Shelby, Mississippi, and the enlisted fillers arrived from reception centers located in the 4th, 6th, 7th, 8th, and 9th Service Commands (Camp Grant, Illinois, 4,060; Fort Custer, Michigan, 3,845; Fort Leavenworth, Kansas, 1,307; Camp Dodge, Iowa, 1,036; Fort Snelling, Minnesota, 990; Eighth and Ninth Service Command reception centers, 921; Fort Bragg, North Carolina, 600; Fort Oglethorpe, Georgia, 600; Fort McPherson, Georgia, 537; Jefferson Barracks, Missouri, 526; Fort Jackson, South Carolina, 218). The division consisted of the following units:

103rd Infantry Division organization (click to enlarge)

- 103rd Infantry Division
  - 103rd Infantry Division Headquarters
  - 103rd Cavalry Reconnaissance Troop (Mechanized) (M3 scout cars and then M8 Greyhound armored cars)
  - 409th Infantry Regiment
    - Headquarters and Headquarters Company
    - 3× Infantry battalions
      - each battalion consists of: 1× Headquarters and Headquarters Company, 3× Rifle companies, 1× Heavy Weapons Company
    - Cannon Company (T12 Gun Motor Carriages and T19 Howitzer Motor Carriages, later replaced by either M3 105mm towed howitzers or M7 Priest self propelled howitzers)
    - Anti-Tank Company (M3 37mm anti-tank guns, which were replaced by 1944 with M1 57mm anti-tank guns)
    - Service Company
  - 410th Infantry Regiment
    - same organization as 409th Infantry Regiment
  - 411th Infantry Regiment
    - same organization as 409th Infantry Regiment
  - 103rd Infantry Division Artillery
    - Headquarters and Headquarters Battery
    - 382nd Field Artillery Battalion
      - Headquarters and Headquarters Battery
      - 3× Batteries (M2 105mm towed howitzers)
      - Service Battery
    - 383rd Field Artillery Battalion
      - same organization as 382nd Field Artillery Battalion
    - 384th Field Artillery Battalion
      - Headquarters and Headquarters Battery
      - 3× Batteries (M1 155mm towed howitzers)
      - Service Battery
    - 928th Field Artillery Battalion
      - same organization as 382nd Field Artillery Battalion
  - Headquarters Special Troops
    - Headquarters Company, 103rd Infantry Division
    - 103rd Signal Company
    - 103rd Quartermaster Company
    - 803rd Ordnance Light Maintenance Company
    - Military Police Platoon
    - 103rd Infantry Division Band (attached)
  - 328th Engineer Combat Battalion
    - Headquarters and Headquarters and Service Company
    - 3× Engineer combat companies
  - 328th Medical Battalion
    - Headquarters and Headquarters Detachment
    - 3× Collecting companies
    - Clearing Company

The following units, or their constituents, were attached for a time to the 103rd Infantry Division during the war: Tank battalions:

- 43rd Tank Battalion
- 47th Tank Battalion
- 48th Tank Battalion
- 191st Tank Battalion
- 756th Tank Battalion
- 761st Tank Battalion
- 781st Tank Battalion

Tank Destroyer battalions:

- 601st Tank Destroyer Battalion
- 614th Tank Destroyer Battalion
- 824th Tank Destroyer Battalion

Field Artillery battalions:

- 69th Armored Field Artillery Battalion
- 242nd Field Artillery Battalion

Anti-Aircraft Artillery battalions:

- 353d Anti-Aircraft Artillery Battalion
- 354th Anti-Aircraft Artillery Battalion

==== Combat chronicle ====
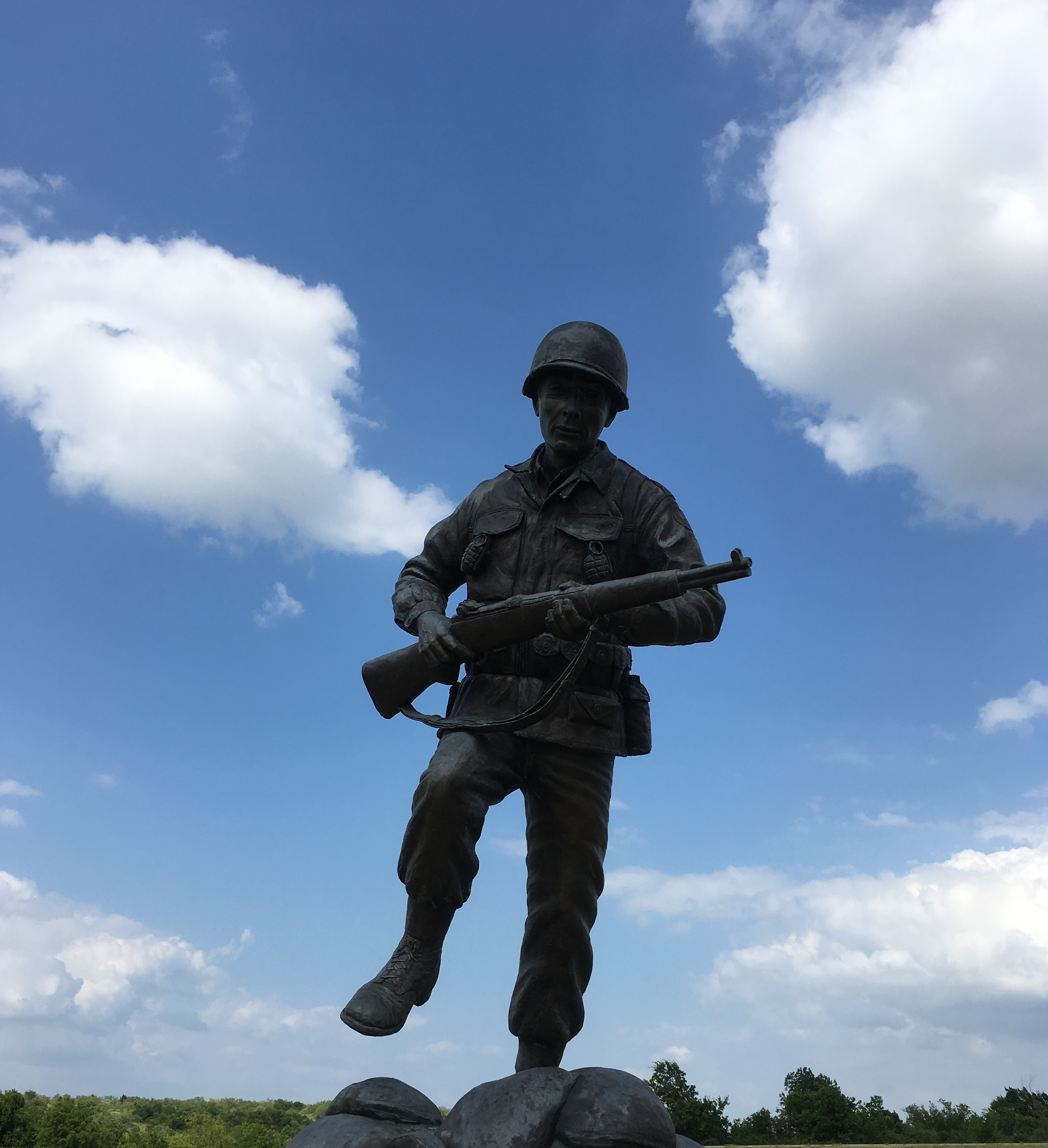
Statue of soldier in combat from US Army's 103rd Division

During 1944, the division lost 2,550 enlisted men from transfers to other divisions or to overseas replacement depots, and replenished its ranks with men transferred from antiaircraft artillery, coast artillery, and tank destroyer units, and aviation cadets and Army Specialized Training Program students reassigned to other duties. After nearly two years of training, the 103rd departed the United States for Europe on 5 October 1944. The division arrived at Marseille, France, 20 October 1944. It relieved the 3d Division at Chevry on 8 November, arrived at Docelles (Vosges) on 9 November, and attacked west of St. Dié, 16 November, in its drive through the Vosges. Meeting heavy resistance all the way, it crossed the Meurthe River, took St. Dié on 23 November and captured Dieffenbach-au-Val on 29 November and Selestat on 4 December.

The division crossed the Zintzel river at Griesbach, 10 December 1944. Pushing through Climbach, the 103rd crossed the Lauter River into Germany, 15 December, and assaulted the outer defenses of the Siegfried Line. On 22 December, the division moved west to the Sarreguemines area where an active defense was maintained. The enemy offensive did not develop in its sector and the 103rd moved to Reichshofen, 14 January 1945, to take up positions along the Sauer River. On 15 January, General Anthony "Nuts" McAuliffe was redeployed from the Battle of the Bulge and given command, which he retained until July 1945. Defensive patrols were active and a limited attack on Soufflenheim on 19 January was repulsed by the enemy. On 20 January, the division withdrew to the Moder and repulsed German advances near Muehlhausen, 23–25 January. The 103rd's offensive began on 15 March 1945. Crossing the Moder and Zintzel rivers and taking Muehlhausen against sharp opposition, the division moved over the Lauter river and penetrated the defenses of the Siegfried Line.

As German resistance disintegrated, the 103rd reached the Upper Rhine Valley, 23 March, and engaged in mopping up operations in the plain west of the River Rhine. In April 1945, it received occupational duties until 20 April when it resumed the offensive, pursuing a fleeing enemy through Stuttgart and taking Münsingen on 24 April. On 27 April, elements of the division entered Landsberg, where Kaufering concentration camp, a subcamp of Dachau, was liberated. The men of the division crossed the Danube River near Ulm on 26 April. On 3 May 1945, members of its 409th Infantry Regiment captured Innsbruck, Austria with little to no fighting. The 411th Infantry Regiment continued on to take the Brenner Pass and earn the honor of linking up with the 88th Infantry Division of the Fifth Army, which had been fighting its way north up the Italian peninsula. Troops met at Vipiteno, Italy, near the Austrian border, on 4 May 1945, joining the Italian and Western European fronts.

After Victory in Europe Day, the division received occupational duties until it left for home and inactivation. It returned to the continental U.S. on 10 September 1945, and was inactivated on 22 September 1945 at Camp Kilmer, New Jersey.

==== Assignments in ETO ====
- 1 November 1944: United States Seventh Army, 6th Army Group
- 6 November 1944: VI Corps, Seventh Army
- 22 December 1944: XV Corps, Seventh Army
- 9 January 1945: XXI Corps, Seventh Army
- 16 January 1945: VI Corps, Seventh Army
- 29 March 1945: Seventh Army, 6th Army Group
- 19 April 1945: VI Corps, Seventh Army

==== Casualties ====
- Total battle casualties: 4,558
- Killed in action: 834
- Wounded in action: 3,329
- Missing in action: 88
- Prisoner of war: 421

==== Campaigns & awards ====
- Campaigns: Ardennes-Alsace, Rhineland, Central Europe
- Awards: Distinguished Service Cross (United States)-12; Distinguished Service Medal (United States)-1; Silver Star-299; LM-3; SM-14; BSM-2,669; AM-92
- Commanders: Maj. Gen. Charles C. Haffner Jr. (November 1942 – January 1945), Maj. Gen. Anthony C. McAuliffe (January–July 1945), Brig. Gen. John N. Robinson (August 1945 to inactivation).

=== Post war ===
The 103rd was activated as an Organized Reserve Corps division on 7 May 1947 in Des Moines, Iowa. Its combat elements were reorganized and redesignated as the 205th Infantry Brigade and the 103rd Operational Headquarters in February 1963. The 103rd Operational Headquarters was redesignated as the 103rd Command Headquarters (Divisional) in June 1963. In December 1965, the unit was reorganized as the 103rd Support Brigade.

In September 1977, the unit was redesignated and reorganized as the 103rd Corps Support Command (COSCOM), the first Corps Support Command in the United States Army Reserve. On 15 September 1993, the 103rd COSCOM inactivated, followed by the creation of two new reserve units: 19th Theater Army Area Command (CONUS) and 3d COSCOM (CONUS). On 14 February 2006, the 103rd was redesignated as Headquarters and Headquarters Company, 103rd Sustainment Command. The 103rd Expeditionary Sustainment Command was activated as a reserve command, effective 16 September 2006. The division shoulder patch is worn by the United States Army Reserve 103rd Sustainment Command (Expeditionary).
