= Charles L. Thomas =

U.S. Amry officer (1920–1980)

Charles Leroy Thomas
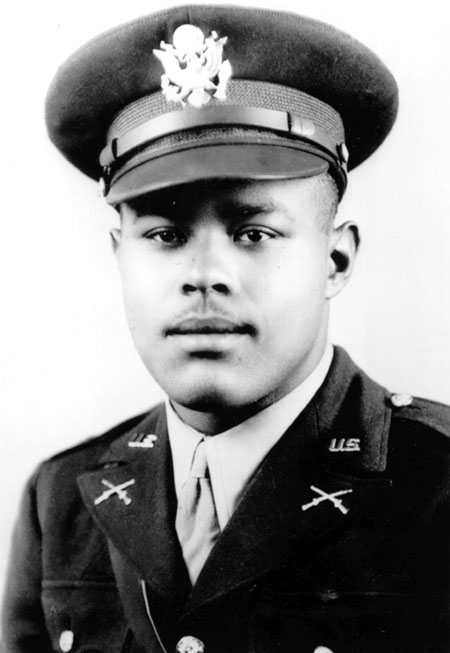
- Lieutenant Charles L. Thomas
- Born: April 17, 1920; Birmingham, Alabama, US
- Died: February 15, 1980 (aged 59); Detroit, Michigan, US
- Burial place: Westlawn Cemetery, Wayne, Michigan
- Military career
- Allegiance: United States of America
- Branch: United States Army
- Service years: 1942–1947
- Rank: Major
- Units: C Company, 614th Tank Destroyer Battalion
- Conflicts: World War II
- Awards: Medal of Honor; Purple Heart

Charles Leroy Thomas (April 17, 1920 – February 15, 1980) was a United States Army major who was a company commander during World War II. In 1997, he was awarded the Medal of Honor, the nation's highest military decoration for valor, for his actions on December 14, 1944, near Climbach, France.

Thomas and six other Black Americans who served in World War II were awarded the Medal of Honor on January 12, 1997. The Medal of Honor was posthumously presented to Thomas by President Bill Clinton on January 13, 1997, during a Medals of Honor ceremony for the seven recipients at the White House in Washington, D.C. The seven recipients are the first and only Black Americans to be awarded the Medal of Honor for World War II.

== Biography ==
Thomas was born in Birmingham, Alabama. He grew up in Detroit and graduated from Cass Technical High School in 1938. Thomas then worked as a molder for the Ford Motor Company (Ford River Rogue factory) with his father, and was a student at Wayne State University studying mechanical engineering.

He was drafted, and entered the U.S. Army on January 20, 1942, at Fort Custer, Michigan. He completed Basic and Advanced Infantry Training at Camp Wolters and was assigned to the Infantry Replacement Training Center at Camp Wolters.

When the Army began forming tank destroyer units, Thomas was transferred to Camp Carson, Colorado and joined the segregated 614th Tank Destroyer Battalion, which had been activated on July 25, 1942. The soldiers were Black, but most of the officers were white. Thomas quickly rose to the rank of Sergeant during unit training and was chosen to attend the Tank Destroyer Officer Candidate School (OCS) Class # 21 at Camp Hood, Texas when the battalion was transferred to Camp Bowie Texas on December 18, 1942.

Thomas was commissioned a second lieutenant upon graduation from OCS on March 11, 1943, and returned to Camp Bowie to assume command of Company C, 614th Tank Destroyer Battalion and prepared the unit for the move to Camp Hood that was completed on March 23, 1943.

On August 27, 1944, he deployed with the 614th to England, arriving on September 7. On October 8, the 614th was on Utah Beach in Normandy, France. The 614th led by Lieutenant Colonel Frank S. Pritchard, then would join General Patton's Third Army in Metz, France. The 614th saw its first combat on November 28. On December 5, the 614th was attached to 411th Infantry Regiment, and on December 6, the 614th was attached to the 103rd Infantry Division..

On December 14, 1944, 1st Lt. Thomas volunteered to lead 3rd Platoon, C Company, 614th Tank Destroyer Battalion in a task force named "Task Force Blackshear" to storm and capture the village of Climbach, a strategically important town which was five miles from the German border. The task force spearheaded by Thomas' M20 scout car (modified M8), consisted of a platoon of Sherman tanks from the 47th Armored Battalion, 14th Armored Division, a platoon of F Company (riding on tanks), 411th Infantry, 103rd Infantry Division, 3rd Platoon, C Company, 614th Tank Destroyer Battalion, rest of F Company, 411th Infantry, and a heavy weapons platoon. Approaching Climbach was uphill, Thomas' armored scout car was knocked out by enemy fire from the German 21st Panzer Division, and he was wounded.

Thomas helped his crew out of the vehicle, but as he left the car's protection, he was again wounded in the chest, legs and arms. Despite his wounds, Thomas directed the dispersal and emplacement of the anti-tank guns, which then returned fire and covered the attempt by the rest of the task force to outflank the defenders. He briefed the 3rd Platoon leader of C Company, a first lieutenant, on the general situation, and only when he was sure the situation was under control did he allow himself to be evacuated. 3rd Platoon, C Company continued to fight for four hours, losing two of its four guns and over half its men as casualties (3 dead, 17 wounded).

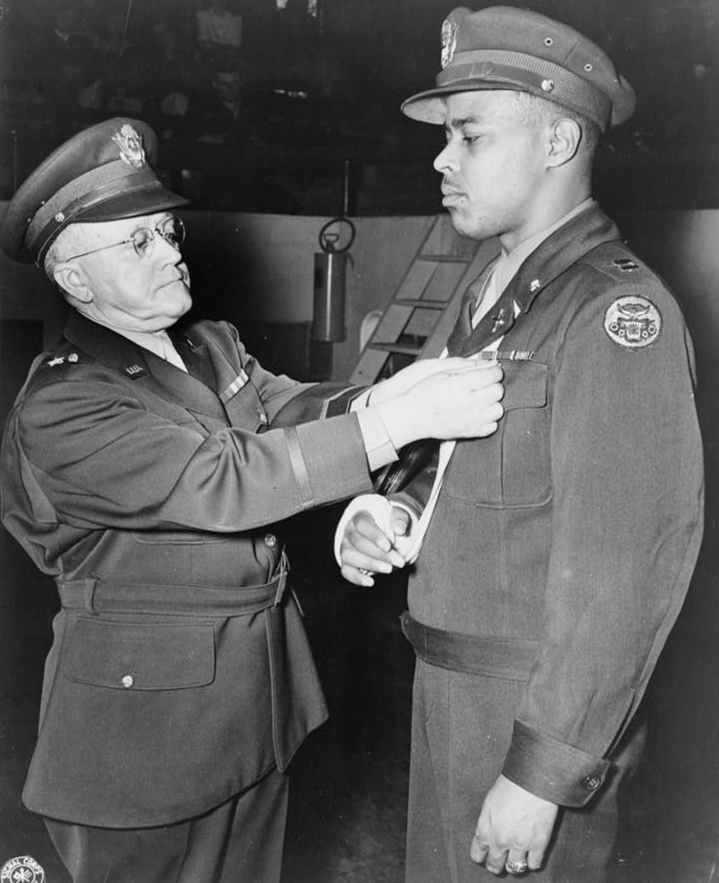
Captain Thomas receiving the Distinguished Service Cross (revoked 1997 for MOH) in 1945

The "valorous conduct" of the platoon, "in the face of overwhelming odds enabled the task force to capture its objective", the village of Climbach, and forced the defenders to withdraw to the Siegfried Line. 3rd Platoon, C Company, 614th Tank Destroyer Battalion, was awarded a Distinguished Unit Citation, the first black combat unit, and the first unit attached to the 103rd Division to be so honored. Its soldiers received four Silver Stars and nine Bronze Stars. Captain Thomas received the Distinguished Service Cross on February 20, 1945, and returned home a hero, though he played down his role – "I know I was sent out to locate and draw the enemy fire, but I didn't mean to draw that much." Thomas remained in the Army, and retired with the rank of major on August 10, 1947.

Thomas married in 1949, and his wife and he had two children. He went to work as a missile technician at Selfridge Air Force Base and later as a computer programmer for the Internal Revenue Service. He died of cancer on February 15, 1980. He was buried in Westlawn Cemetery in Wayne, Michigan.

Medal of Honor

In the early 1990s, it was determined that Black soldiers had been denied consideration for the Medal of Honor (MOH) in World War II because of their race. In 1993, the U.S. Army had contracted Shaw University in Raleigh, North Carolina, to research and determine if there was racial disparity in the review process for recipients of the MOH. The study commissioned by the U.S. Army, described systematic racial discrimination in the criteria for awarding decorations during World War II. After an exhaustive review of files, the study recommended in 1996 that ten Black Americans who served in World War II be awarded the MOH. In October of that year, Congress passed legislation that would allow President Clinton to award the Medal of Honor to these former soldiers. Seven of the ten including Thomas were approved, and awarded the MOH (six had Distinguished Service Crosses revoked and upgraded to the MOH) on January 12, 1997. On January 13, 1997, President Clinton presented the MOH to the seven Black Americans; Major Thomas and five others were posthumously presented the MOH. A niece of Thomas accepted his MOH during the ceremony. Vernon Baker was the only living recipient of the medal at the time.

Combat Infantry Badge
Medal of Honor	Purple Heart	Army Good Conduct Medal
American Campaign Medal	European-African-Middle Eastern Campaign Medal w/ 3/16" bronze star	World War II Victory Medal

== Medal of Honor citation ==
Thomas' Medal of Honor citation reads:

The President of the United States in the name of The Congress takes pride in presenting the Medal of Honor posthumously to

Major Charles L. Thomas
United States Army

Citation:

For conspicuous gallantry and intrepidity at the risk of his life above and beyond the call of duty: Then Lieutenant Charles L. Thomas distinguished himself by extraordinary heroism in action on 14 December 1944. One platoon of Company C, 614th Tank Destroyer Battalion, was designated as the lead element in a task force formed to storm and capture the village of Climbach, France. Lieutenant Thomas, the Commanding Officer of Company C, realized, with the obscurity of information regarding the enemy and a complete lack of reconnaissance, the mission would be an extremely dangerous one. Fully cognizant of the danger, Lieutenant Thomas volunteered to command the selected platoon of his company and ride in the column's leading vehicle - a highly maneuverable, but equally vulnerable, M-20 scout car. Lieutenant Thomas knew that if there was a concentration of enemy armor in the village, as was believed, he would absorb the initial shock of the first enemy resistance. The task force left Preuschdorf, France, at 1023 hours, and proceeded to advance in column toward Chimbach. Lieutenant Thomas in his scout car stayed well in front of the column. At 1400 hours, upon reaching the high ground southeast of the village, Lieutenant Thomas experienced initial contact with the enemy. As his scout car advanced to an exposed position on the heights, he received intense direct fire from an enemy artillery, self-propelled guns, and small arms at a range of seven hundred yards. The first burst of hostile fire disabled the scout car and severely wounded Lieutenant Thomas. He immediately signaled the column to halt. Before leaving the wrecked vehicle, Lieutenant Thomas and the crew found themselves subjected to a veritable hail of enemy fire. Lieutenant Thomas received multiple gunshot wounds in his chest, legs, and left arm. In spite of the intense pain caused by his wounds, Lieutenant Thomas ordered and directed the dispersion and emplacement of his first two antitank guns. In a few minutes these guns were effectively returning the enemy fire. Realizing that it would be impossible for him to remain in command of the platoon because of his injuries, Lieutenant Thomas then signaled for the platoon commander to join him. Lieutenant Thomas then thoroughly oriented him as to the enemy gun positions, his ammunition status, and the general situation. Although fully cognizant of the probable drastic consequences of not receiving prompt medical attention, Lieutenant Thomas refused evacuation until he felt certain that his junior officer was in full control of the situation. Only then did Lieutenant Thomas allow his evacuation to the rear. Throughout the action, Lieutenant Thomas displayed magnificent personal courage and a complete disregard for his own safety. His extraordinary heroism spurred the soldiers of the platoon to a fierce determination to triumph, and resulted in a mass display of heroism by them. Lieutenant Thomas' intrepid actions throughout the operation reflect the highest traditions of the military service.

/S/ Bill Clinton

== See also ==
- Vernon Baker
- Edward A. Carter Jr.
- John R. Fox
- Willy F. James Jr.
- Ruben Rivers
- George Watson
- List of Medal of Honor recipients
- List of Medal of Honor recipients for World War II
- List of African American Medal of Honor recipients
