= 614th Tank Destroyer Battalion =

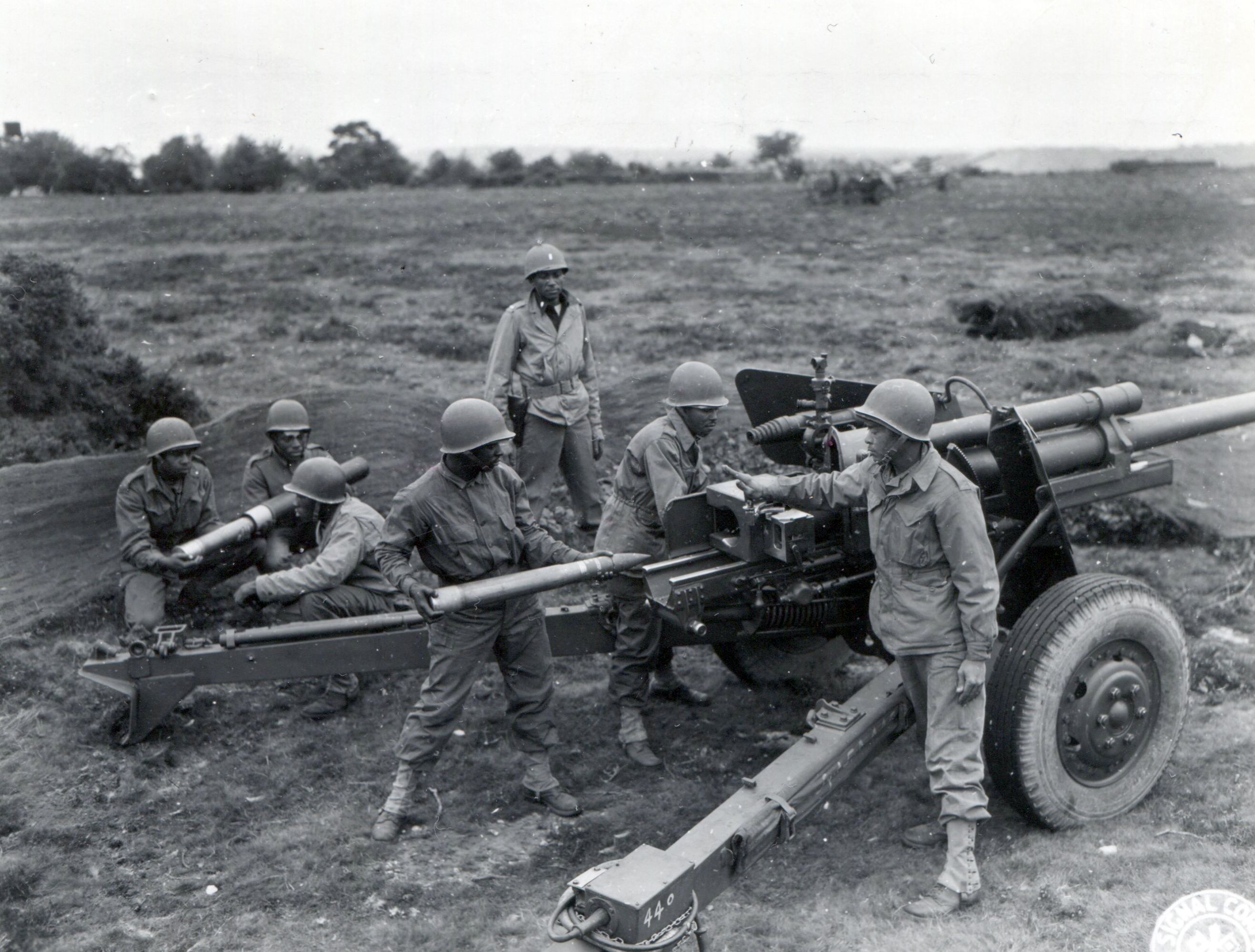
- Black American soldiers of the 614th Tank Destroyer Battalion
- Active: 25 July 1942 – 31 January 1946; 30 June 1946 – 1 November 1946
- Country: United States
- Allegiance: United States Army
- Part of: Independent unit
- Equipment: 3 inch Gun M5
- Engagements: World War II: Liberation of France; Climbach; Battle of the Bulge; Western Allied invasion of Germany
- Decorations: Presidential Unit Citation (3rd Platoon, C Company)

Commanders
- Notable commanders: Lt. Col. Blaisdell C. Kennon

The 614th Tank Destroyer Battalion was a tank destroyer battalion of the United States Army active during the Second World War. The unit was activated in 1942 and trained through the late summer of 1944. Arriving on the Normandy coast in October, they moved to the Metz, France, area, seeing their first action in late November. In early December, they were attached to the 103rd Infantry Division, a pairing that was to last through the end of combat in Europe. The 3rd Platoon, Company C, of the 614th was the first African-American unit to receive a Distinguished Unit Citation during World War II. They received credit for the Northern France, Rhineland, Ardennes-Alsace and Central Europe campaigns.

== Early service ==
The battalion was activated at Camp Carson, Colorado, on 25 July 1942, under the command of Lt. Col. Blaisdell C. Kennon. The original cadre consisted of 35 officers and 156 enlisted men, with 140 of the enlisted men coming from the 366th Infantry Regiment at Camp Devens, Massachusetts and 16 from the infantry replacement training center at Camp Wolters, Texas. Additional personnel arrived to bring the enlisted strength to 420 and basic training was started at Camp Carson. The battalion was soon ordered to Camp Bowie, Texas, arriving there on 18 December 1942. It completed basic training there and was ordered to Camp Hood, Texas, arriving on 23 March 1943. The unit began tank destroyer training with the M3 GMC destroyer but was reorganized as a towed battalion, using the 3-inch Gun M5, pulled by the M3 half-track, on 17 July 1943. On 18 July, the unit was assigned to the Tank Destroyer Center Training Brigade as school troops; assisting with training of new troops. In October, Lt. Col. Kennon was transferred and Lt. Col. Frank S. Pritchard assumed command on the 16th. Col. Pritchard would remain with the unit throughout their combat time in Europe. The battalion continued as school troops until 20 December 1943, when training prior to overseas service was started. They were ordered to the Louisiana Maneuvers area next, arriving 2 March 1944. After receiving a satisfactory rating on maneuvers, they returned to Camp Hood on 23 March 1944. Another period of intensive training ensued and by 1 June 1944, all tests had been satisfactorily completed and the unit was qualified for overseas service. The battalion received movement orders in August and after a brief stay at Camp Shanks, New York, they boarded the British ship "Esperance Bay" on 27 August and arrived in Avonmouth, near Bristol, England, on 7 September 1944.

The battalion deployed into Normandy on 8 October, and moved south to Metz; it first saw action operating against the Siegfried Line on 28 November, relieving the 705th Tank Destroyer Battalion which was supporting the 3rd Cavalry Group. On 1 December, the unit's first day on the line, A Company's accurate fire was instrumental in the reduction of several pillboxes and the destruction of a German 88mm gun near Borg, Germany. It was moved to VI Corps on 5 December and then attached to the 103rd Infantry Division on 5 December, deploying in the vicinity of Gougenheim, France, where Co A was attached to Task Force Forest and Co C to the 411th Infantry Regiment. The 103rd moved into the line on 8 December, and began its attack on the 9th. On the 11th, Co B, less one platoon serving as part of the Palace Guard at the Division CP, was attached to the 411th IR. As with most tank destroyer units by this stage of the war, it only rarely fought against enemy armor; more commonly, it provided fire support against strongpoints and observation posts or indirect fire to support infantry units. Per authority, letter dated 1 December 1944, they received credit for a Battle Participation Award-Northern France Campaign, the first for the unit. On the 13th, Co A, less 1 platoon, was relieved from TF Forest and assigned to the 410th IR.

== Engagement at Climbach ==
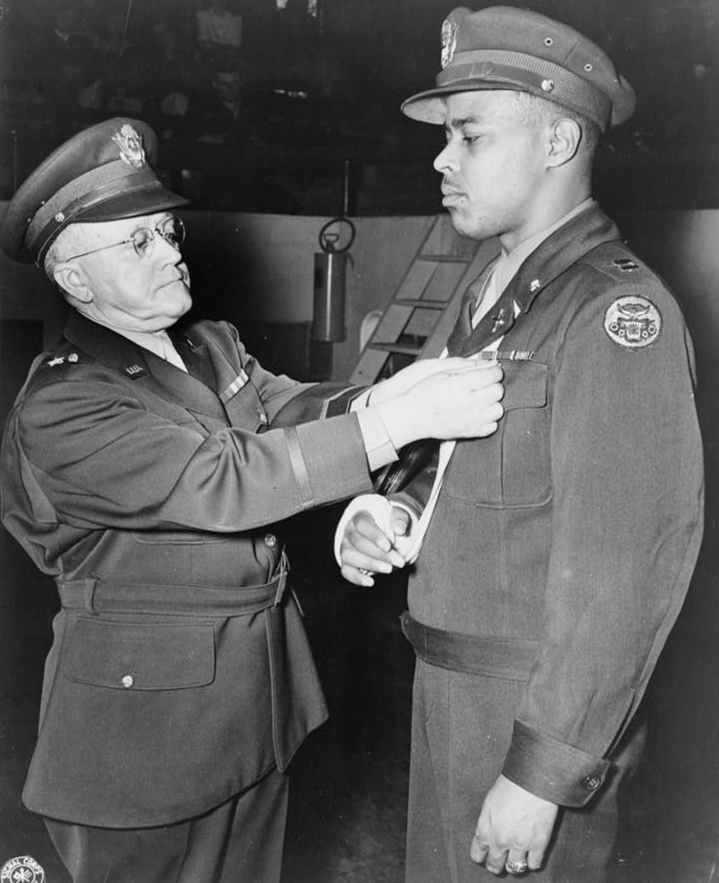
Captain Thomas being awarded the Distinguished Service Cross, 1945

On 14 December, a task force of the 411th Infantry Regiment, TF Blackshear, consisting of a company of infantry, along with a platoon of tanks from the 14th Armored Division and 3rd Platoon, C Company, of the 614th TD with its towed anti-tank guns, was organized to attack Climbach, a French town just outside the German border, acting in a pincer movement. Expecting an American assault with tanks, the German defenders had prepared a strong defensive position as well as an ambush by infantry anti-tank teams.

The third platoon and its towed anti-tank guns were tasked with demolishing German emplacements and defensive works. The lead vehicle was an M20 armored utility car containing Lieutenant Charles L. Thomas, the commander of the tank destroyer platoon; as it travelled up the narrow road, it was hit by heavy enemy fire and knocked out. Thomas was wounded when evacuating the vehicle, but stayed to organize the deployment of his anti-tank guns which were to provide a base of fire allowing the infantry and tanks to flank the enemy positions. The 3rd platoon remained in action for four hours, with the gun crews sometimes reduced to two out of ten men. Two of the company's guns were quickly knocked out by German artillery, then a third, but the fourth gun kept firing until it was nearly out of ammunition. A single truck driver, T/5 Robert W. Harris, knowing the remaining gun was running out of ammunition, drove his truck to the rear for a new load and upon his return, disregarded the warning from the TF Commander that it was too dangerous to proceed. Driving to within 25 yards of the gun positions, where the truck became stuck in the mud, he unloaded and uncrated the 3" rounds and began carrying them to the remaining gun. The remaining members of the platoon joined him and made numerous trips carrying the ammunition, all the while under heavy enemy fire.

In anticipation of ambushing the assault force, the German defenders had placed an infantry company in the nearby woods. When the men of C Company began deploying their towed guns, the German infantry attacked the anti-tank guns, and C Company's men, though armed only with M1 carbines, .45 pistols, and submachine guns, responded in kind. One half-track driver, surprised from behind by a German infantry squad, mowed down eight of his attackers with several blasts from his .45 caliber grease gun. Despite heavy casualties, the 614th repulsed the German infantry attack, killing most of the assault force. By nightfall, when the engagement ended, only sporadic small-arms fire came from the town, which was quickly seized by American troops. Defeated, surviving enemy forces retired to the Siegfried Line.

The platoon took heavy losses, with more than half its men listed as killed or wounded; three of the four guns were put out of action, and two half-tracks and an armored car were destroyed. The divisional report recorded that the "outstanding performance of mass heroism on the part of the officers and men of Company C, 614th Tank Destroyer Battalion, precluded a near catastrophic reverse for the task force". The 3rd Platoon received the Distinguished Unit Citation for this engagement; it was not only a first for a unit attached to the 103rd Division, but also the first African-American unit to receive the citation. Platoon members were awarded nine Bronze Stars, four Silver Stars (two posthumously), and Lieutenant Thomas, who had been seriously wounded, was awarded the Distinguished Service Cross.

Orders were received for the battalion to move to Neufvillage, France, on 22 Dec 1944, and upon arrival they reverted to the control of XV Corps for operations. The Battalion Commander was assigned as Anti-Tank Officer, in charge of AT defense in the division sector, by the 103rd ID. On 28 December, the Commanding General of the 103rd ID personally pinned medals on two officers and eight enlisted men for their actions on 14 December as part of TF Blackshear.

In the 1990s, a study indicated severe racial discrimination in the process of awarding medals during the war, and it was recommended that seven Distinguished Service Crosses awarded to African Americans be upgraded to Medals of Honor, an award for which, while technically eligible, none would have been considered at the time. One of these seven was Lieutenant Thomas, and he was accordingly awarded the Medal of Honor posthumously on 13 January 1997.

== A winter on the defensive ==
The closing days of 1944 found the gun companies assigned as follows: Company A with the 410th IR, Company C with the 411th IR and Company B with various part-time assignments, which included guarding the division CP, attachment to the 44th Infantry Division or the 106th Cavalry Group and at times with the battalion CP. The companies participated in a number of small engagements and, at one point, fired artillery missions on attachment to the 928th Field Artillery Battalion. Notable engagements included one on 1 January – where an isolated outpost killed nine and captured two of an enemy patrol in a small-arms firefight – or 12 January, when a two-gun section fired 143 rounds over forty minutes at an observation post, scoring 139 direct hits – a rate of a round every thirty-five seconds from each gun, with 97% accuracy.

When the 103rd Division moved back to prepared lines in the Hagenau Forest on 20 January, the battalion withdrew alongside them. Weather conditions, with snow and ice-covered roads, proved to be unfavorable for the 614th's equipment with three 3" guns and six half-tracks having to be abandoned and destroyed in situ. The 2nd platoon of Company C did manage to save a 3" gun by eventually reaching safety pulling it, and carrying the platoon leader and 14 men, with a 1/4 ton "jeep". On the 25th, Company C was stationed in Schillersdorf when approximately 450 German SS troops attacked. All the men were able to vacate the town except for one officer and 11 enlisted men who were captured. All of the men were liberated and returned home after the war. The battalion remained on the defensive through February, helping fend off raiding parties and infiltrating patrols, and mounted a platoon-strength raid itself that month, with great success. Five members of the unit were awarded Bronze Stars for their part in the raid. The record of this engagement in the contemporary divisional history described the battalion as "the crack negro 614th", testifying to the high regard in which the unit was held by the 103rd.

== Advance into Germany ==
Seventh Army's spring offensive began on 15 March, and the 614th moved forward alongside the 103rd. As before, its companies were split up, one to each infantry regiment; each also possessed a company of the 761st Tank Battalion, another all-black unit. Company A captured the town of Kindwiller with a group of dismounted soldiers, while the battalion reconnaissance company raided Bischholtz and took forty-one prisoners. The advance continued to the Rhine, where the division halted and began a period of military occupation. The end of March saw the battalion located around Waldsee, Germany. On 7 April, the battalion CP was located at Momlingen, Germany, with the companies occupying Neidernberg, Stockstadt, Erlenbach, Ostheim and Momlingen, continuing to perform occupation duties. On 11 April, per General Order No. 141, Headquarters Seventh Army, the 3rd platoon, Company C, was cited for outstanding performance of duty in action against the enemy on 14 December 1944, in the vicinity of Climbach, France.

The division – and the 614th – moved forward again on 21 April, in pursuit of a retreating enemy, seeing sporadic opposition. On 22 April, one NCO was killed, 6 EM captured and one NCO missing when their vehicle was ambushed near Hegenlohe, Germany. On 24 April, the captured EM were released and reported to the Bn CP. Elements of the 44th Infantry Division had contacted a German column, and after a fire fight, many prisoners were captured and a number of Germans killed. During the confusion, the EM were released by the Germans and told to get back to their proper units. The battalion's last combat casualties were on 2 May near Scharnitz, Austria, losing seven men ( 5 KIA, 1 WIA, 1 captured) of a task force pushing towards Innsbruck. The next day, a platoon of Company C was attached to a force sent to seize the Brenner Pass, which they did on the 4th without any opposition, and push through to meet the lead elements of the 88th Infantry Division driving up from Italy.

== Post War Service ==
7 May found the battalion, minus Company B, at Leutasch and Ober Leutasch, Austria. Company B was in Moserne and later moved to Telfs. Here the battalion was able to rest. On 12 May, General McAuliffe pinned Silver Stars on Captain Walter S. Smith, 1st Lt. Serreo S. Nelson and Lt Christopher J. Sturkey, while his staff pinned the ribbons of the Distinguished Unit Citation on members of the 3rd Platoon of Company C. Officers and men had passes and furloughs until early July when the unit was alerted to move. On the 10th they were ordered to move to Marseille, France. Here it was found the battalion was to be broken up and the men sent to service units, but after General McAuliffe and others had intervened, the orders were changed and the battalion awaited orders to ship to the Pacific or be assigned to occupation duties in Europe. But, the war in the Pacific ended too and on 10 September 1945, the battalion received orders to return to Germany. On the 25th, the battalion CP was established at Hofheim with the companies occupying nearby towns. They remained on occupation duty until early 1946 when they were ordered to return to the U.S. The 614th was deactivated on 31 January 1946, at Camp Kilmer, New Jersey.

The battalion was reactivated as a Negro General Reserve Unit at Camp Hood, Texas, on 30 June 1946, pursuant to General Orders No. 20, Headquarters, 2nd Armored Division dated 27 June 1946. Activated under the command of Lt. Col. Delmer P. Anderson, the 614th received its first shipment of fillers on 1 July from the Overseas Replacement Depot, Camp Kilmer, New Jersey, all of whom were regular Army re-enlistees originally intended for European duty. Additional personnel arrived during July and August. On 19 August, Lt. Col. Henry W. Allerd assumed command, relieving Lt. Col. Anderson. A 13-week individual training program was started the 3rd week of July. On 3 September, the battalion received two M18 Hellcat tank destroyers to be used for preliminary training. Effective 1 November 1946, per General Orders No. 43, Headquarters, Second Armored Division, dated 19 October 1946, the 614th Tank Destroyer Battalion was deactivated.

Throughout its combat career, the soldiers of the 614th Tank Destroyer Battalion acquired the following decorations: one Distinguished Unit Citation, one Distinguished Service Cross, which was later upgraded to the Medal of Honor, eight Silver Star Medals and thirty Bronze Star Medals.
