= M6 gun motor carriage =

American tank destroyer

37 mm gun motor carriage M6
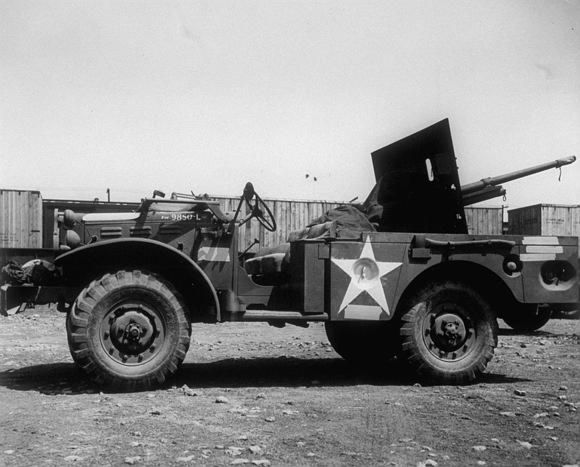
- Side view of 37 mm gun motor carriage M6
- Type: Tank destroyer
- Place of origin: United States

Service history
- In service: 1942–1945
- Used by: United States, Free France, Philippine Commonwealth
- Wars: World War II

Production history
- Unit cost: $4,265

Specifications
- Mass: 7,350 lb (3,330 kg)
- Length: 14 ft 10 in (4.52 m)
- Width: 7 ft 4 in (2.24 m)
- Height: 6 ft 11 in (2.11 m)
- Crew: 4 (Commander, gunner, loader, driver)
- Armor: Gun shield:.25 in (0.64 cm)
- Main armament: 37 mm gun M3; 80 rounds
- Engine: Dodge T-214 6 cylinder 4-cycle inline gasoline engine 99 hp (74 kW)
- Power/weight: 29.7 hp/metric ton
- Suspension: Semi-elliptic leaf spring
- Operational range: 180 mi (290 km) on road
- Maximum speed: 55 mph (89 km/h) on road

The 37 mm gun motor carriage M6, also known as M6 Fargo, and under the manufacturer (Dodge)'s designation WC55, was a modified Dodge WC52 light truck mounting a light anti-tank gun. It was used by the United States Army for infantry support and as a mobile anti-tank gun. It operated from late 1942 to January 1945 in the Mediterranean, European, and Pacific theaters of World War II. The M6 saw limited use during the war, and was poorly suited to modern warfare as it was unarmored and was armed with a too small caliber gun. Being required to back into firing positions rather than forward firing proved to be a deficiency.

== Description ==
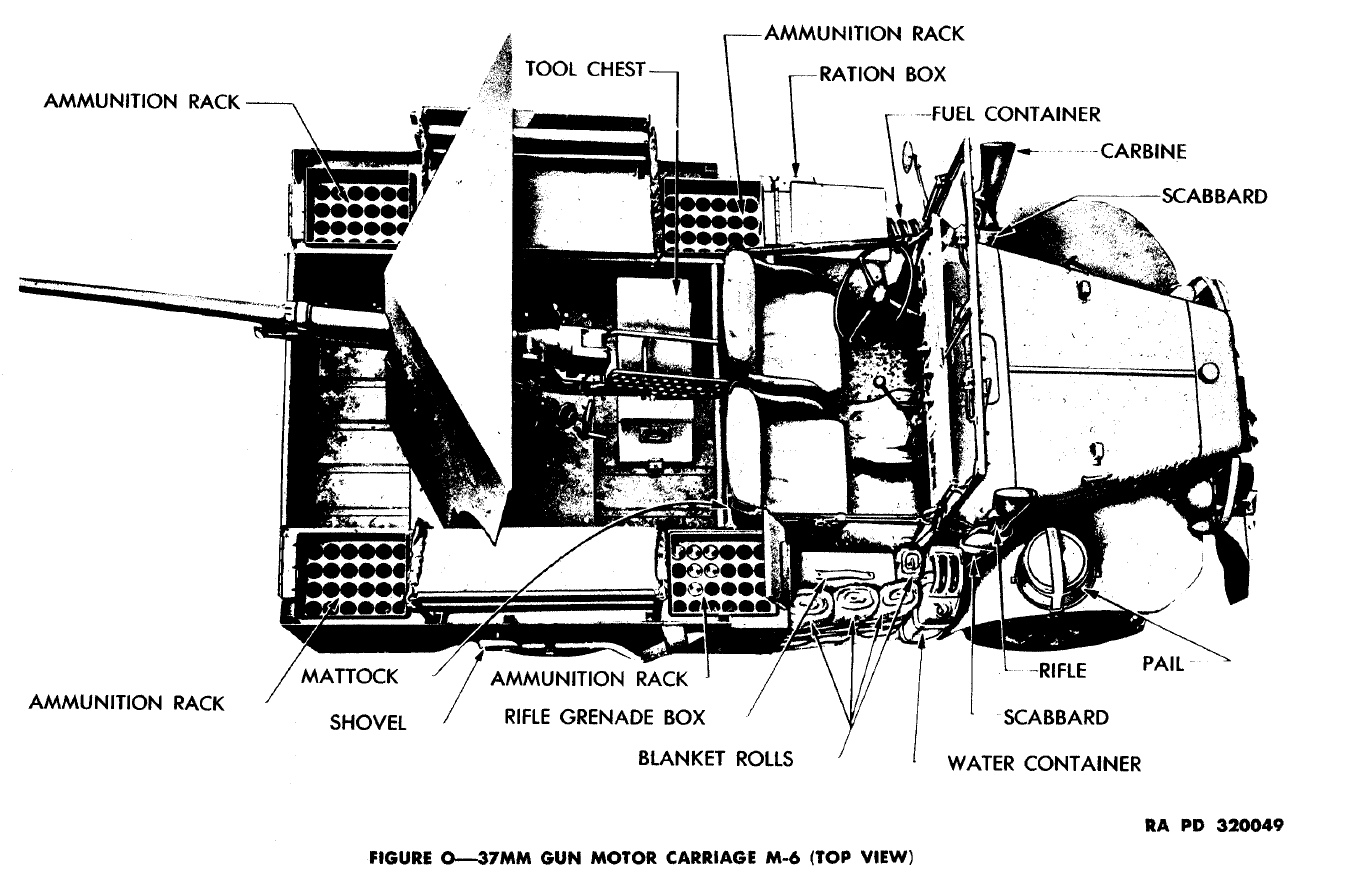
M6 WC-55 top schematic

The 37 mm GMC M6 was a modified 3/4-ton 4x4 Dodge WC52 truck with a rear-facing 37 mm M3 gun mounted in its bed (portee) and designated WC55. The gun was normally fired to the rear – it could not be fully depressed when pointed to the front of the vehicle due to blast effects on the crew and vehicle windshield. The gun fired M74 Armor Piercing (AP) Shot that could penetrate 1.4 in (3.6 cm) of armor at 500 yd (460 m). Other ammunition carried throughout its service life included the Armor Piercing Capped (APC) M51 Projectile (which could penetrate 2.4 in (6.1 cm) of armor at 500 yd), and the High Explosive (HE) M63 Projectile. Eighty rounds of 37 mm ammunition were carried aboard.

The crew-members were equipped with personal weapons for self-defense.

== Service ==
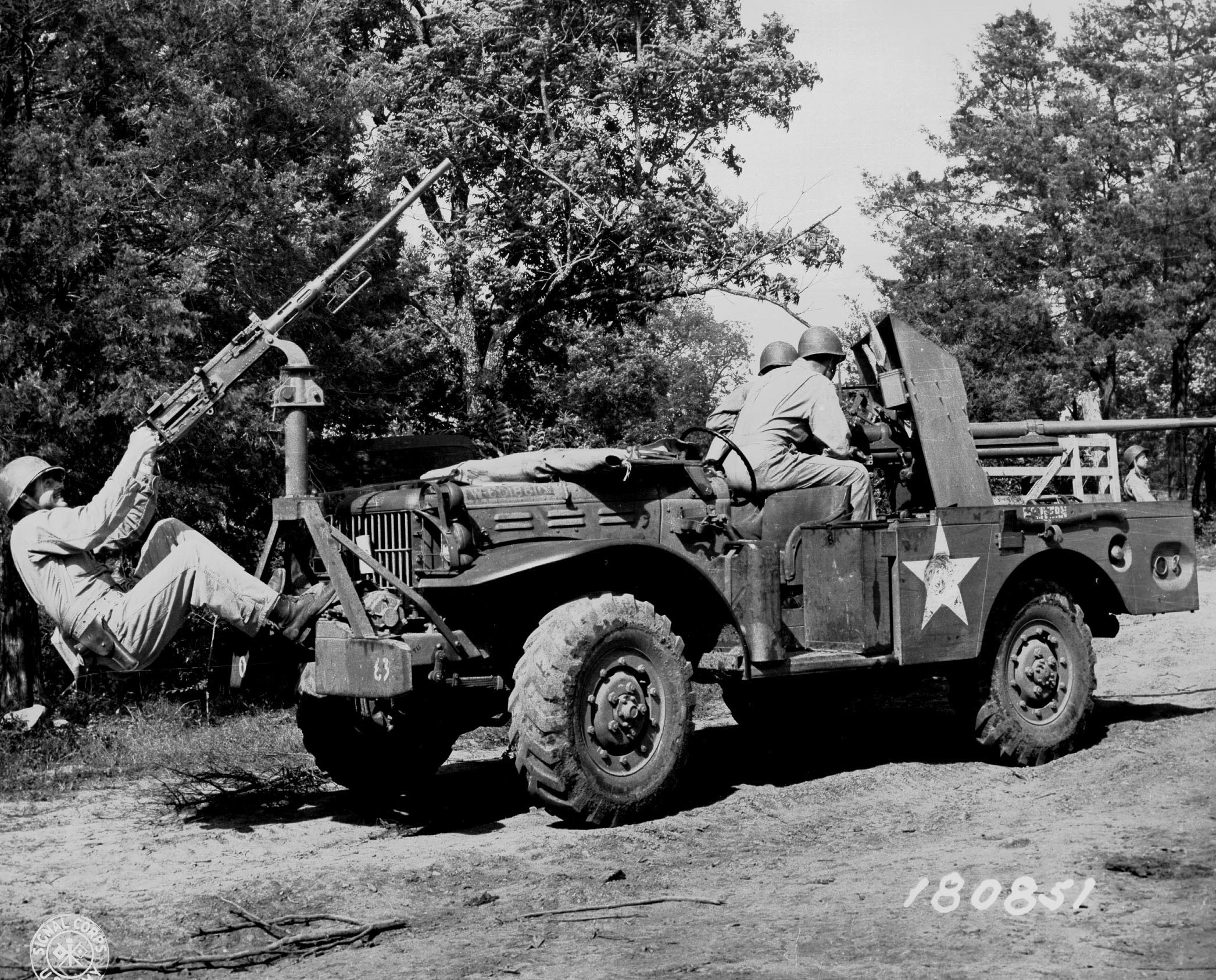
Second Army Tennessee Maneuvers – to increase firepower, a 50 cal. machine gun was mounted on the front of the 37 mm gun truck (June 1943).

With the design standardized in February 1942, 5,380 GMC 37 mm M6 GMC were built between April and October, 1942, at a cost of $4,265 per unit. American doctrine planned for tank destroyers to defeat enemy tank attacks while tank units proper carried out offensive duties. The 37 mm GMC M6 saw limited employment with U.S. forces (the 601st and 701st Tank Destroyer Battalions) during the campaign in Tunisia in late 1942 and early 1943. The vehicle was not well liked because it lacked armor and carried an anti-tank gun that was largely ineffective against German tanks of the period. The 37 mm GMC M6 also saw limited use in the Pacific Theater in 1943 and 1944. They equipped some Marine units, but were withdrawn before seeing combat. The 37 mm GMC M6 was soon classified as "limited standard" in September 1943, because of the availability of more powerful tank destroyers mounting 75 mm (2.95 in) and 3 in (76 mm) guns. In January 1945, the GMC M6 was declared obsolete.

After the Tunisian campaign, many M6 Fargos had their 37 mm gun removed and reverted to a cargo truck role as the WC52. Some of these 37 mm guns were mounted onto halftracks to provide the armored infantry with a gun halftrack. Other 37 mm GMC M6 vehicles found their way into service with the French Army, and were employed during the allied landings on Corsica. M6 vehicles were later provided to French Forces of the Interior units after the liberation of France. Despite the vehicle's obvious limitations on the battlefields of Northwest Europe 1944–1945, the FFI used practically any vehicle they could obtain because of equipment shortages of all kinds.

== See also ==
- AEC Mk I Gun Carrier "Deacon" – British 6-pounder (57 mm gun) on armored truck of 1942.
- G-numbers, (G121)
- M-numbers
- Dodge WC series
