= Tank destroyer battalion (United States) =

Type of unit used by the United States Army during World War II

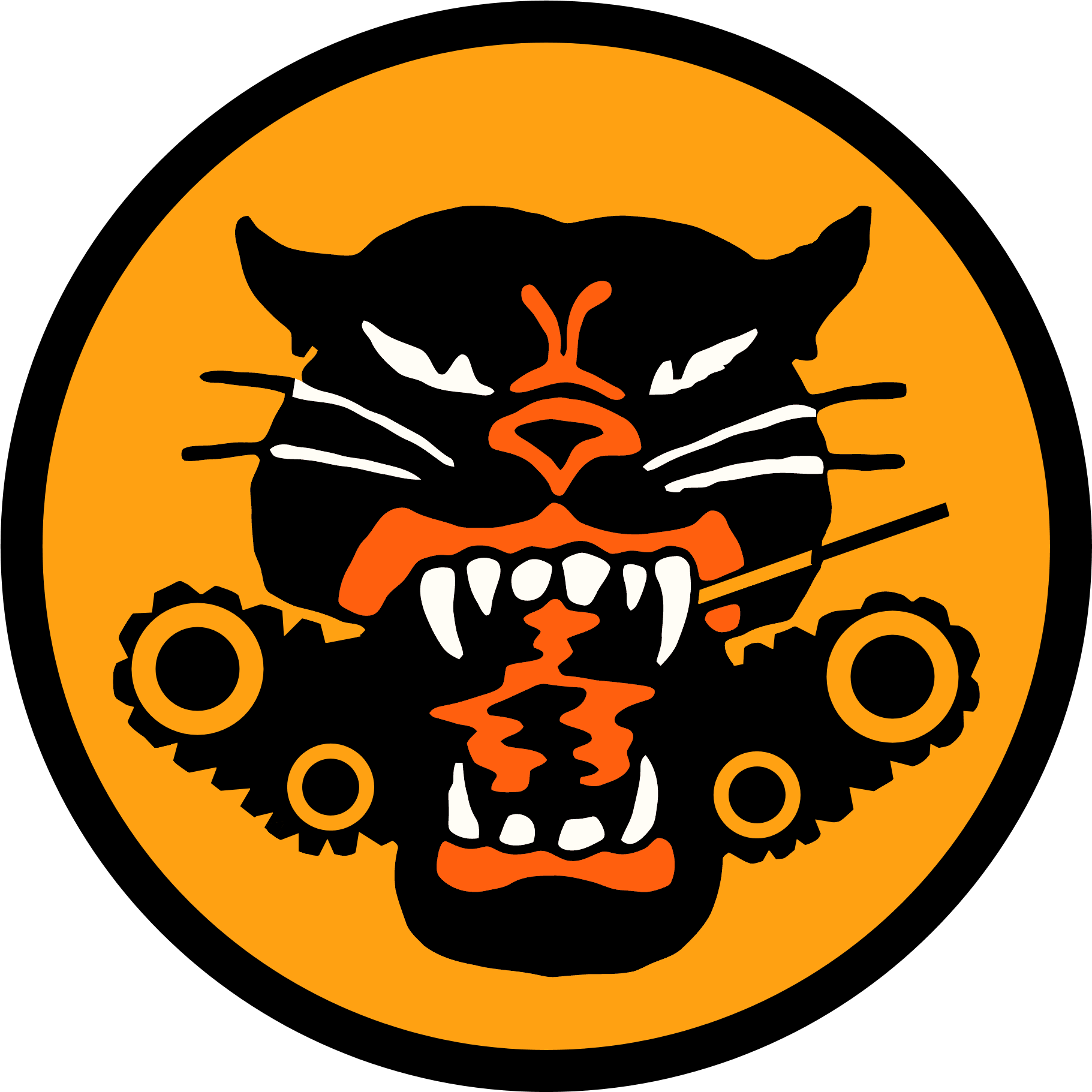
All tank destroyer battalions used the same patch representing a Panther crushing an armored tracked vehicle.

The tank destroyer battalion was a type of military unit used by the United States Army during World War II. The unit was organized in one of two different forms—a towed battalion equipped with anti-tank guns, or a mechanized battalion equipped with armored self-propelled guns. The tank destroyer units were formed in response to the German use of massed formations of armored vehicles units early in WWII. The tank destroyer concept envisioned the battalions acting as independent units that would respond at high speed to large enemy tank attacks. In this role, they would be attached in groups or brigades to corps or armies. In practice, they were usually individually attached to infantry divisions. Over one hundred battalions were formed, of which more than half saw combat service. The force was disbanded shortly after the end of the war when the concept had been shown to be militarily unsound.

== Doctrine development ==
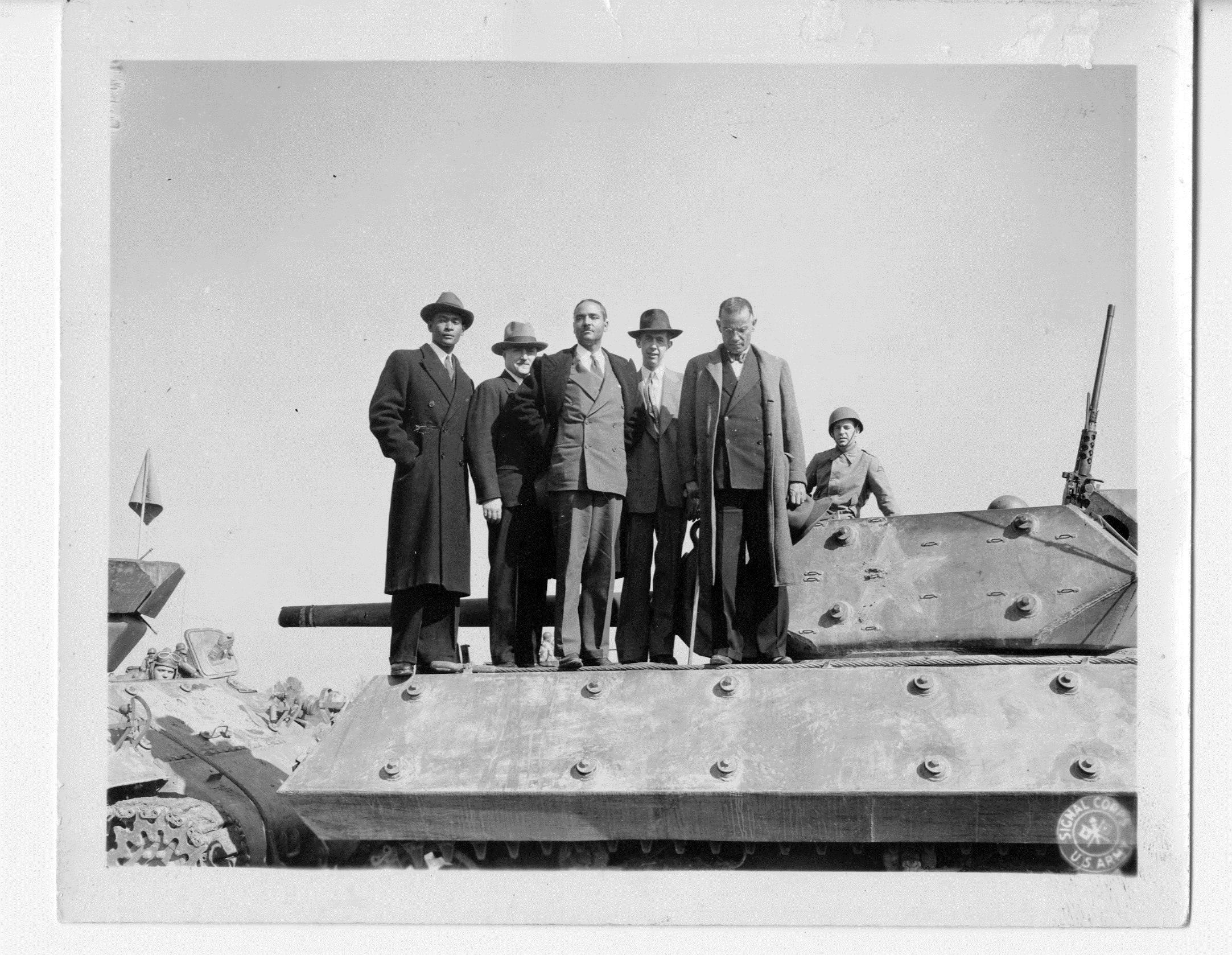
Haitian newspaper reporters with an M10 tank destroyer from the 608th Tank Destroyer Battalion.

In April 1941, a conference focused on the future of antitank operations. The immediate effect was to create an anti-tank battalion in infantry divisions, but this organic anti-tank capacity was not deemed sufficient. The conference gave broad support to the idea of creating mobile anti-tank defensive units (commanded by corps or army formations) which could be deployed to meet an armored attack. The effort stalled on the issue of which branch of the Army should control it—the infantry (as a defensive role), the cavalry (as a mobile response force), or the artillery (as heavy guns). The Armor Branch did not press for control of the anti-tank units, feeling that it would be at odds with their general principles of maintaining the offensive. In May, General George C. Marshall "cut through the knot" by declaring the issue as sufficiently important to be dealt with as a combined-arms organization, forming an Anti-Tank Planning Board headed by Lt. Col. Andrew D. Bruce, and appointing Brigadier General Lesley J. McNair to take immediate action on organizing anti-tank forces.

Three anti-tank "groups" were quickly organized, with each consisting of three anti-tank battalions drawn from personnel of infantry divisions and various support units, and tasked with "speedy and aggressive action to search out and attack opposing tanks before they had assumed formation". In August, a plan was laid out for a program of 220 anti-tank battalions. (Note: This assumed a fifty-five division army; there would be one organic to each division, another 55 held at corps and army level, and 110 in a GHQ strategic reserve. This extreme proposal, rating four battalions to each division, would have committed a quarter of the Army's strength to the anti-tank role.)

The first nine units were deployed during the Louisiana Maneuvers of 1941, equipped with towed 37 mm M3 anti-tank guns (the largest gun that could be towed by a jeep) and surplus 75 mm M1897 guns mounted on half-tracks (the M3 gun motor carriage), and again in the Carolinas maneuvers that November. Their employment was judged a success—though not without some disgruntled voices in the Armored Branch arguing that the umpires had rigged the results — and on 27 November, Marshall ordered the establishment of a tank destroyer Tactical and Firing Center at Fort Hood, Texas, under Bruce, and the activation of 53 new anti-tank battalions under the command of General Headquarters. The term "tank destroyer" was used from this point on, as it was seen as a more psychologically powerful term. On 3 December, all existing anti-tank battalions were reassigned to General Headquarters and converted to tank destroyer battalions. The new tank destroyer doctrine was formally stated in Field Manual 18–5, Tactical Employment, Tank Destroyer Unit, in June 1942. It laid down a focused doctrine— "There is but one battle objective of tank destroyer units… the destruction of hostile tanks"—and repeatedly emphasized an offensive, vigorous spirit. Tank destroyer units were expected to be employed as complete battalions, held in reserve and committed at critical points, rather than parceled out as small defensive strongpoints. The emphasis was heavy on mobility, and the ability to outmaneuver the attacking armor; this would feed into vehicle design, and cause the speed of a vehicle to be prioritized over survivability.

One side-effect of the new status of the tank destroyer force was that, as a fully-fledged independent branch, it was required by War Department policy to establish units manned by African Americans – the United States Army remained racially segregated until the Korean War, but the War Department placed pressure on the Army to ensure that a fair proportion of combat units were black. Two of the initially converted battalions were black, with another four created in 1942 and four (of a planned six) in 1943. Several would eventually see combat, and the 614th Tank Destroyer Battalion would become the first black unit to receive a Distinguished Unit Citation. (Note: The two original units were the 795th and the 846th (later deactivated); the honored unit was 3rd Platoon, Company C, 614th Tank Destroyer Battalion)

=== Tactics ===
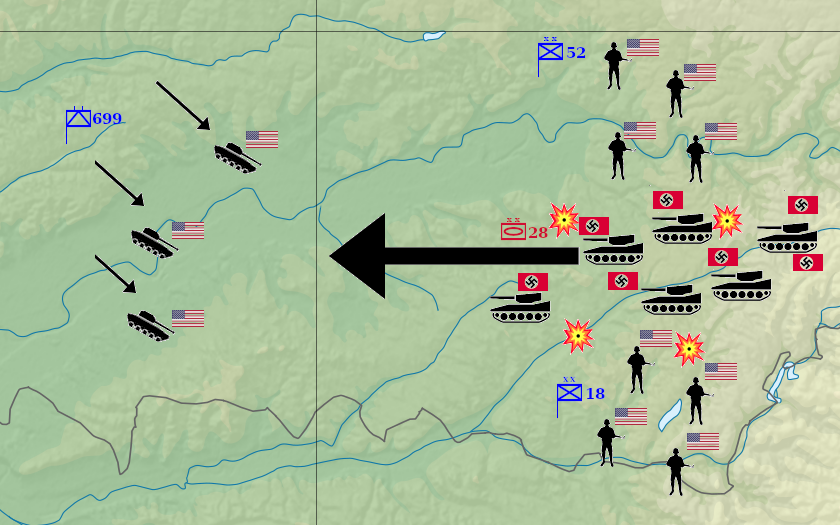
Basic US Tank Destroyer doctrine: German armor breaks through US lines. A tank destroyer battalion responds by moving into the path of the advance. The units then position themselves to fire at the advancing tanks from hidden positions.

US tank destroyer doctrine was essentially a defensive and reactive measure. Their role was to slow down, or even stop, a Blitzkrieg style armored thrust and prevent it from penetrating too deeply or from encircling friendly forces in a pincer movement. The idea was that, once an enemy armored thrust was expected to break through, the tank destroyer battalion (as a single unit and operating behind the front lines), would position itself to intercept the enemy while a more complete defense is organized at corps or higher level. This was to be the case for both towed and mobile tank destroyer battalions. As the enemy armored thrust approached, organic reconnaissance units would communicate to battalion commanders the best locations for tank destroyer units to place themselves in, while organic pioneer units would create blockades or help the tank destroyers dig into their positions. As the enemy armored thrust came within range, the hidden tank destroyer units would fire upon enemy tanks and then retreat to another position once they began to draw fire.

In the offense, mobile tank destroyers were not given the duty to hunt down enemy tanks, (Note: Training Notes from Recent Fighting in Tunisia, 15 May 1943, stated, "Tank destroyers must not be taught to go out to hunt tanks with the idea of getting behind them and hitting them. They must be taught to dig in, conceal themselves and wait for the tanks to come up. When this is done the tank destroyers are easier to keep concealed, and there is less chance of giving the position away.") as this would be the role of their own tanks. Instead, they were to be positioned close to the advance to stop any counter-attacking armored force. (Note: "On the attack, the T.D.s will do well to remain back a bit, and yet close enough to be a good supporting weapon. 500 to 800 yards behind an attack, and rolling along with it - will find the T.D.s performing effectively.") Towed tank destroyer units had no offensive role in an armored thrust, and were given the task of supporting infantry units or being used as indirect fire units to augment artillery. Mobile tank destroyers were also allowed to support infantry operations, or even function in an indirect fire role, so long as their main mission was not compromised.

In terms of vehicle design, mobile tank destroyers were to be heavily armed, but with speed given priority over armor protection. Unlike tanks, mobile tank destroyers were not designed to survive hits from enemy AP rounds, but to mainly resist small arms fire. Crews were also trained to hide their vehicle from enemy fire.

== Organization ==
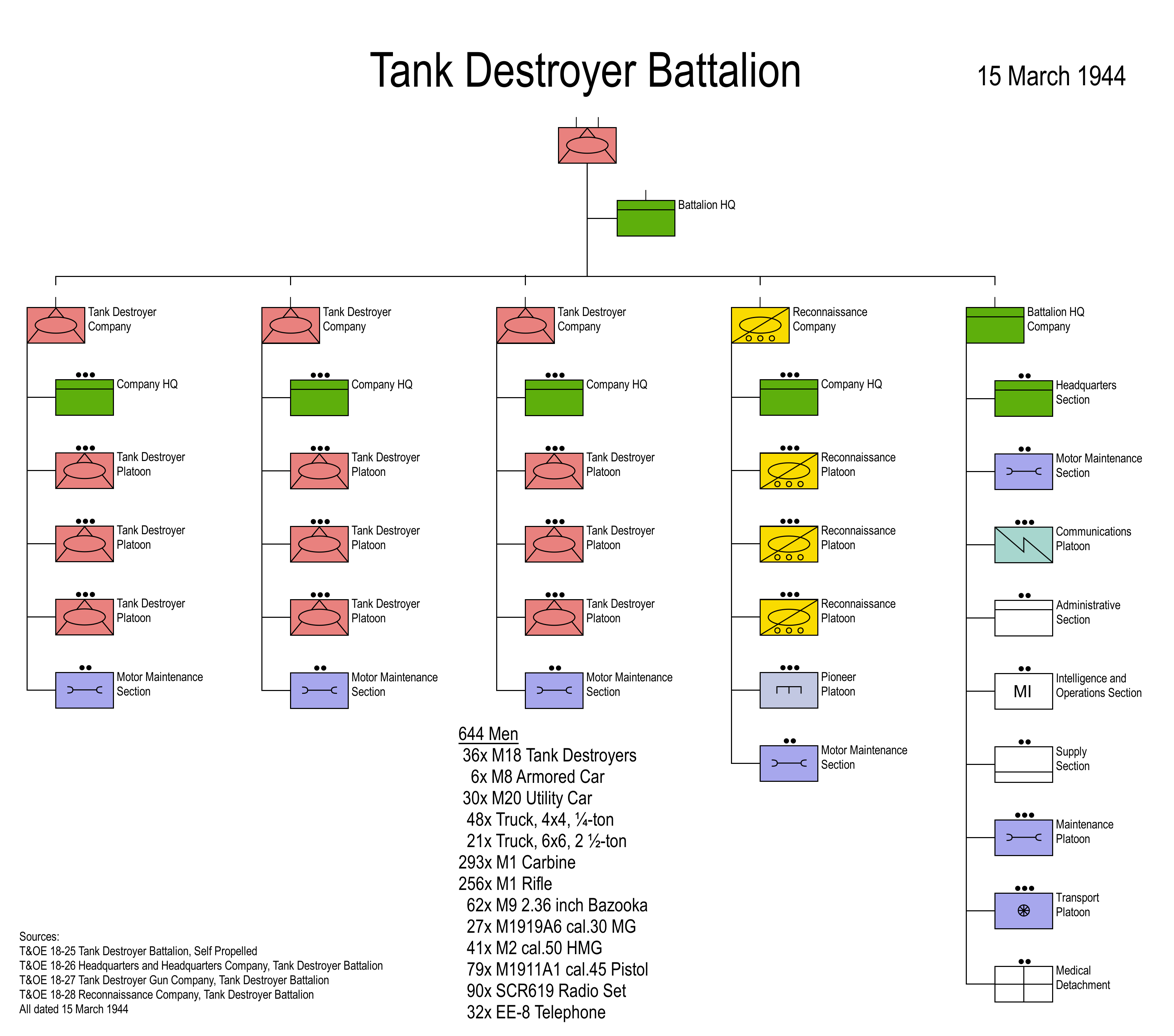
Tank Destroyer Battalion (SP) Structure - March 1944. The Battalion consisted of three companies of twelve vehicles each, plus a motorised reconnaissance company that also included a pioneer (engineer) platoon.

Three initial organizations were laid down in December 1941; two were light organisations equipped solely with 37mm guns, and were abandoned as soon as possible to standardise on the third type, modeled after the 893rd Tank Destroyer Battalion, and officially declared the standard organization with the publication of FM 18–5 in June 1942. This was designated the "tank destroyer battalion, heavy, self-propelled", and consisted of:

- A headquarters company
- A reconnaissance company (including a pioneer platoon),
- Three tank destroyer companies of twelve vehicles each

The three tank destroyer companies each had one platoon of four 37mm self-propelled guns and two platoons of 75mm self-propelled guns. Each platoon had two sections of two guns each, an anti-aircraft section of two self-propelled 37mm guns, and a "security section" of twelve infantrymen. This gave a total of twenty-four 75mm guns, twelve 37mm guns, eighteen anti-aircraft guns, and 108 security troops. The vehicles used were the M3 GMC, with a 75mm gun, and the M6 GMC, a 3/4 ton 4x4 Dodge truck with a 37 mm gun mounted in the rear compartment facing to the rear.

The battalions deployed to North Africa used this organization, with both heavy and light anti-tank guns, but as reports from Europe indicated that light anti-tank guns were no longer playing a significant role in combat, the light platoons were converted to a third "heavy" 75mm gun platoon under a new organization issued in November 1942. As M10 tank destroyers came into use, with a 3-inch gun, these replaced the 75mm gun-equipped M3 GMCs.

By 1943, the role of tank destroyer battalions was becoming better understood, and the early ideas of mass employment of tank destroyer units had become obsolete. As a result, the number of battalions planned was steadily reduced, and the manpower and equipment assigned to them was reduced. A new table of organization produced in January 1943 reduced the overall manpower by 25%, by eliminating the anti-aircraft units (which had proven unnecessary), reducing the number of supporting units, and combining the tank destroyer platoon's headquarters with its security section. There was no reduction in actual combat strength.

In early 1943, stemming from problems found in North Africa, the Army began to consider a more defensive role for tank destroyer units. After trials in January, fifteen battalions were ordered to convert to towed guns on 31 March, and shortly thereafter it was decided that half of all tank destroyer units would convert to a towed organization. The broad outline of the battalion remained – three companies of three platoons of four guns – but the reconnaissance company was downgraded to two platoons in the headquarters company. However, the need for larger gun crews and more security troops meant that the manpower of the unit increased again. These units were equipped with 3-inch M5 guns towed by trucks or M3 Halftracks. However, combat experience in Normandy and in Italy – coupled with the fact that purpose-built M18 Hellcat and M36 tank destroyers were becoming available – showed that the towed units were underperforming compared with self-propelled ones. After the Ardennes campaign, where 85% of all tank destroyer losses were towed guns, it was decided to convert all towed units back to self-propelled guns.

=== Reconnaissance and pioneer units ===
The Reconnaissance company of the tank destroyer battalion was made up of three reconnaissance platoons and one pioneer platoon, along with supporting units.

The reconnaissance platoons had two main missions for the battalion's tank destroyer units: "Route reconnaissance, particularly of those routes over which the gun companies will move to reach combat areas", and "Area reconnaissance, particularly to locate general areas suitable for use as combat areas by the gun companies". Other missions included zone reconnaissance, battle reconnaissance, security missions and counter-reconnaissance. (Note: These other missions were more generic and were common amongst all reconnaissance units and not specific to tank destroyer battalions. Route and Area reconnaissance, however, had specific instructions unique to tank destroyer doctrine) Each platoon had two M8 Greyhound armored cars and five 1/4 ton trucks (jeeps). In the context of Tank Destroyer doctrine - that the battalion be placed in the path of an enemy armored thrust - the reconnaissance platoons served to seek and locate areas for tank destroyer units to set up.

The pioneer platoon had two general missions: to prevent the movement of the battalion from being delayed by natural or artificial obstacles, and to impede or canalize the movement of the enemy by the creation of obstacles. The pioneer platoon consisted of a platoon headquarters and two sections, each section included ten men and two 1 1/2-ton trucks equipped with pioneer tools and equipment; the platoon headquarters consisted of six men, an M20 armored utility car (a variant of the Greyhound), and an air compressor (MT2) complete with all its various air powered tools.

Since neither the pioneer nor reconnaissance units were able to function as originally intended (see below), they were often attached to other units (such as engineering battalions or cavalry reconnaissance squadrons) that operated under the division or corps that the tank destroyer battalion had been assigned to.

== Combat experience ==
=== North Africa ===
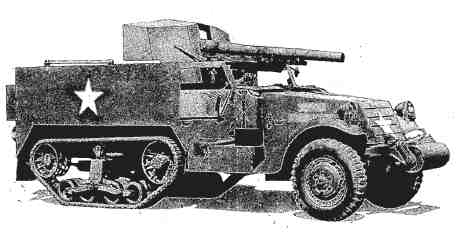
The M3 gun motor carriage (M3 GMC), which mounted a 3-inch gun on a half track, was the first effective mobile US tank destroyer.

During the Tunisian Campaign of 1942–1943, the US forces would employ seven tank destroyer battalions. (Note: The 601st, 701st, 767th, 805th, 813rd, 844th and 899th Tank Destroyer Battalions, nominally of the 1st Tank Destroyer Group) However, contrary to doctrine they were invariably broken up down to the platoon level to support infantry units. On the one occasion where a tank destroyer battalion was employed as an organized unit—the 601st, at the Battle of El Guettar—it defended against an attack by the 10th Panzer Division, destroying 30 of its 57 tanks. (Note: Eight more Panzers were destroyed in a minefield laid by the battalion.) This engagement had the distinction of being the only time a battalion would fight in the way envisaged by the original "tank destroyer" concept, as an organized independent unit opposing an armored force in open terrain. The 601st lost 24 of its 36 M3 GMC tank destroyers. Seven M10 tank destroyers from the 899th tank destroyer battalion were also lost in the battle.

Critical analysis of the new force was mixed; while the 601st had successfully repulsed the attack, it had lost two-thirds of its strength in the process, contributing to Major General George Patton's declaration that the concept was "unsuccessful in the conditions of the theater". McNair responded by further clarifying the role of the tank destroyer—it was to be a highly mobile force, which sought to find and occupy favorable positions to engage an oncoming enemy attack. A tank destroyer "need only to maneuver for a favorable position, conceal itself thoroughly and ambush the tank"—it was not intended to be used in a frontal offensive, or in assault in combat like a tank.

Training problems were also exposed. Mobile Tank Destroyer units had not been trained to work together as a battalion - despite the doctrine being so clearly to the fore, actual training of the units was done at a small unit level. Also at issue was the performance of the organic reconnaissance units, who had never experienced such extended distances in training as they were forced to operate in North Africa. With an inability to work together as a battalion, along with the poor performance of the organic reconnaissance units, many vehicles were lost in the Battle of El Guettar.

Major changes to the overall doctrine emerged from the North African campaign.

Flaws had emerged in the M3 GMC and M10 tank destroyers—they were not fast enough, and had an overly high silhouette which made them vulnerable to direct enemy fire. Major General Omar Bradley, then commanding the U.S. II Corps in North Africa, suggested that towed anti-tank guns could be reintroduced to infantry units—while it was feared this would lead to a lack of offensive spirit, it was undeniable that a small towed gun could be dug in very quickly and efficiently, giving a very low-profile target, though a large gun sometimes took a day to fully prepare. Bradley's proposal was not, however, intended to create towed TD battalions. His intent was to put the anti-tank assets in the hands of infantry units. The fact that the British Army had had success with dug-in antitank guns supported his proposal, and an experimental battalion was established in the summer with 3-inch guns. This quickly gained popularity—heavily supported by McNair—and in November 1943 it was ordered that half of all tank destroyer battalions were to be equipped with towed guns; this was a major distortion of Bradley's suggestion.

The expected employment of the battalions shifted. While the formal doctrine still called for the employment of complete battalions, the Tank Destroyer Center began to emphasize a new focus on combined arms training and small-unit actions. New field manuals were prepared to discuss the independent operation of tank-destroyer platoons, and crews began to have specialized training in their secondary roles, such as indirect gunnery or anti-fortification work.

Changes in training were made to ensure that tank destroyer units acted according to operating procedure. This was necessary because too many tank destroyer units in North Africa were "behaving like tanks" and attacking German tanks "head-on", despite their lack of armor. Further training changes involved the role of the organic reconnaissance companies, which were not adequately performing their assigned tasks: route and area reconnaissance with the specific aim of finding locations for tank destroyers to ambush approaching enemy tanks.

=== Sicily and Italy ===
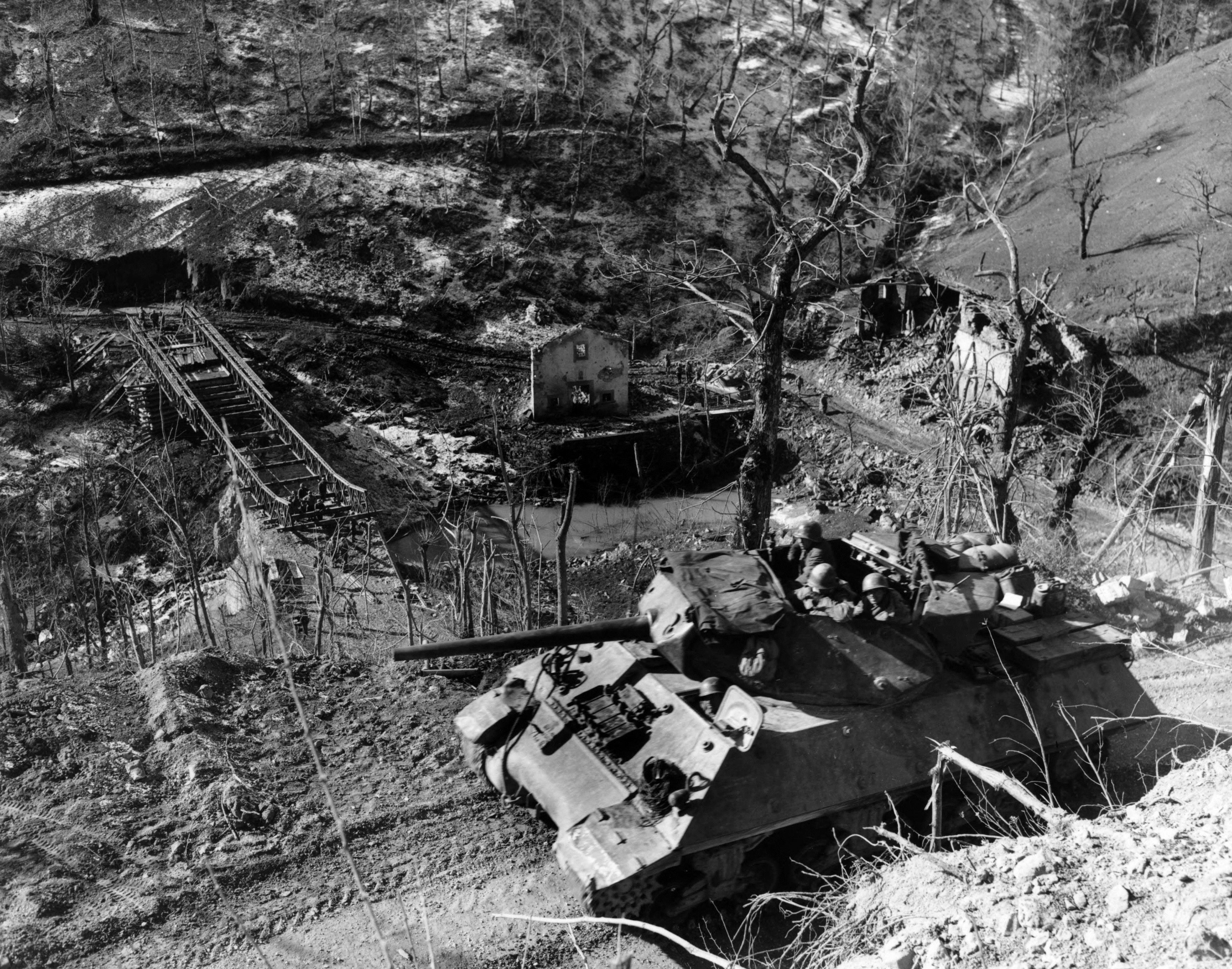
A M10 of the 701st TD Battalion advancing along a mountain road, in an example of the broken terrain common in Italy

There were not enough anti-tank guns to cover the frontage and still have depth. That left gaps in the AT defenses that were filled by bringing tanks and tank destroyers way forward. These were such big targets, since they could not be dug- in, that many of them were knocked out by German 88mm guns and Mark VI tanks. As a result we lost some ground to tank-led attacks. Then we put all our anti-tank guns right in the front line wherever they could be dug-in to cover the front. We placed the tanks and tank destroyers well back but ready to move up to reinforce the anti-tank guns. After we took this action, we stopped all the tank-led attacks cold.
—Executive Officer, 15th Infantry Regiment

The second theater of operations for tank destroyer units was the Italian campaign, beginning with the landings in Sicily in July 1943, and continuing into mainland Italy that September. While German armor was present in the theater, it was rarely committed to battle in large groups; this was partly a result of the broken, heavily cultivated, terrain, but also due to a growing conservatism and defensive ethos on the German side. As a result, the tank destroyers found themselves used for a variety of other tasks, most commonly local artillery support.

A report in late 1944, reviewing the use of tank destroyer units in combat, found that in practice they were often expected to fulfill the roles of armor support:

During the planning stage for an attack it was found that practically without exception the infantry commanders were reasonable in their requirements and expectations of support by the tank destroyers. But once the battle was joined, the original plans with few exceptions were often discarded and the destroyers were ordered to go forward as tanks ahead of the infantry...

When operating with armored forces, it was common to attach a company or a platoon to a tank battalion or company, and use them in an overwatch role. When operating in defense, tanks and tank destroyers were pooled as a rear-area reserve and brought into the line to blunt tank-led attacks against infantry positions.

A major lesson learned from the Italian campaign was that the conversion to towed guns was not as advantageous as had been previously thought. The mobility and protection of the tank destroyer was found to outweigh the towed anti-tank gun's low profile. At Anzio, a number of British towed anti-tank gun units were overrun and knocked out simply because they were unable to redeploy on short notice, while self-propelled guns were able to fall back and continue fighting.

In Italy, the last few M3 GMC were replaced by the M10. Although the M10 was incapable of dealing with the frontal arc of the rarely-encountered Panther tanks and Tiger tanks, it was sufficient against most enemy armor encountered in Italy, and against heavy tanks from the flank. The M18 was first deployed in the summer of 1944, and was not seen as a great success in the Italian theater; its high speed was only of limited use in the restricted terrain, and as a result it was effectively a slightly up-gunned M10.

=== Tank destroyer forces reduced ===
In August 1942, the Tank Destroyer Command was redesignated the "Tank Destroyer Center," representing a "sharp restriction of authority" to purely a training establishment, with tank destroyer battalions leaving the custody of the Center entirely after their training was finished. From a high of 220 battalions, now deemed excessive, the 1943 troop basis called for only 114. In April 1943, it was called for that only 106 battalions be activated, the number active or in the process of activation at that time. By October 1943, it was found that the need for tank destroyers overseas was far less than had been expected, and the Tank Destroyer Center began to reduce its training activities.

Thirty-five tank destroyer battalions never left the United States. Twenty-five battalions were broken up in 1943 and 1944 for their manpower. The personnel either went to reinforce existing battalions, were reassigned to non-divisional infantry regiments for a six-week period of training to be converted to infantry replacements, or were assigned directly to stateside infantry divisions for retraining as infantry. The remainder of the battalions were kept occupied with miscellaneous tasks such as serving as school troops, until their inactivation. Ten battalions (not counting one that did so while overseas) were converted to other types of units, chiefly tank, amphibious tractor, or armored field artillery battalions.

=== Northwest Europe ===
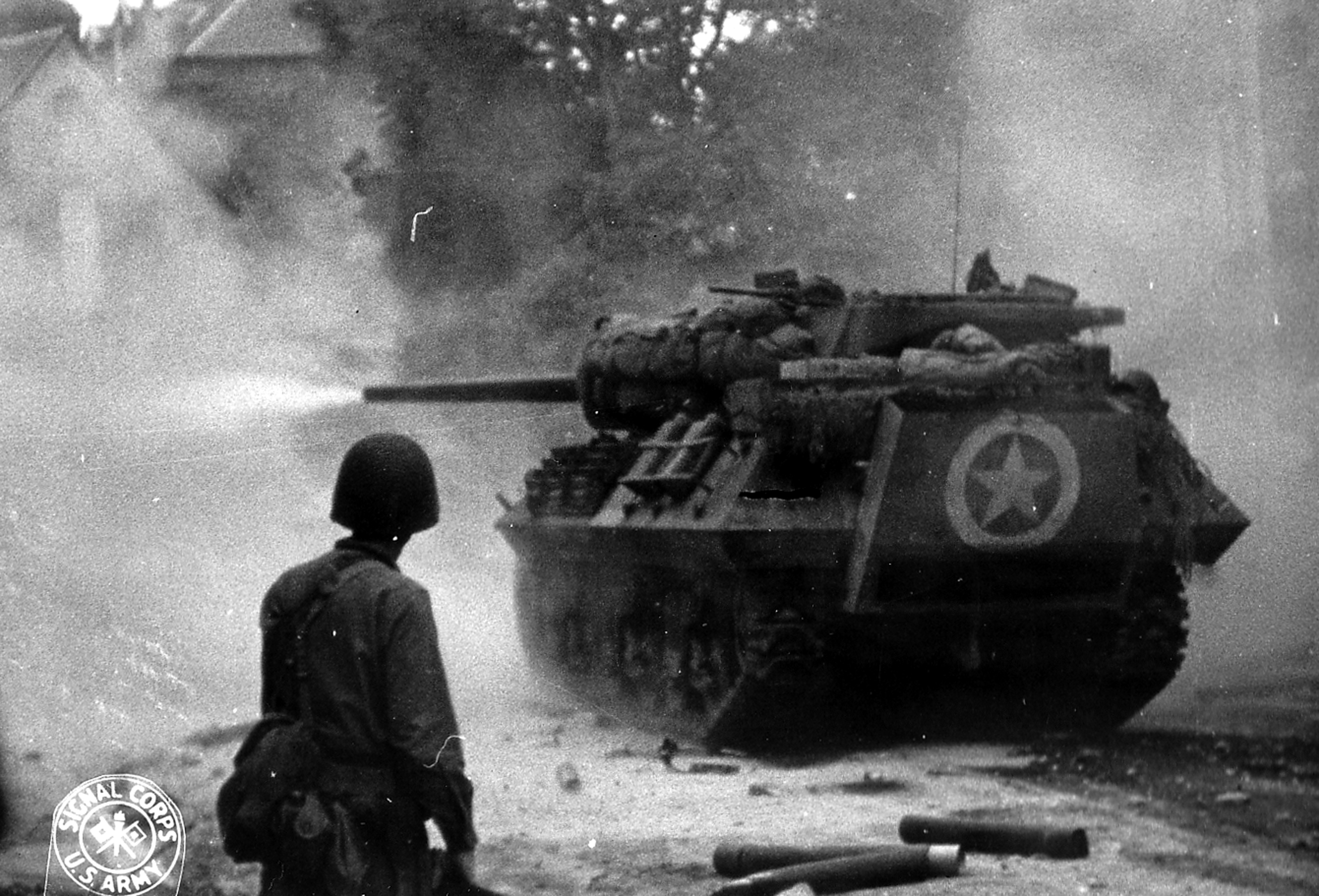
M10 tank destroyer in action near Saint-Lô, June 1944.

In countless operations, mobile guns with armor protection used these characteristics to their decided advantage. They could move in or out of position freely; in combat, towed weapons waited for nightfall (except in extreme emergency) before moving, and once committed had little opportunity for their thin-skinned prime-movers to change them to another position. Towed guns had a limited traverse, compared to the vehicular weapon, and their prime-movers were of little assistance in altering their traverse. The vehicular weapon could follow the advance of infantry or armor, or become a part of the forward elements of the assault, all well beyond the capability of the towed gun..

— William F. Jackson (Major) et al.
Employment of four tank destroyer battalions in the ETO. May 1950 p 171-172 of 188

By far the largest employment of tank destroyer units was in the north-western Europe campaign through France, the Low Countries and Germany. They were employed from the very beginning of the campaign, with one battalion being landed on Utah Beach in a follow-up wave on D-Day.

A revised version of Field Manual 18–5, introduced in June 1944, broadened the doctrine of tank destroyer operations. It allowed for a more dispersed deployment of the battalions throughout a force, and recommended that when enemy armor was only expected to be deployed in small groups, tank destroyers were to be distributed among forward units. It became general practice to attach a tank destroyer battalion semi-permanently to a division; this meant that it was locally available for emergencies, and that it would be able to train alongside "its" division when out of the line.

The most significant employment of tank destroyers in Normandy was in early August, at the Battle of Mortain, where the 823rd Tank Destroyer Battalion (towed 3-inch guns) was on the defensive alongside the 30th Infantry Division. The division, which was in temporary positions and not prepared for a defensive engagement, was attacked by elements of four panzer divisions on 6 August, under heavy fog. The 823rd put up a strong defense—knocking out fourteen tanks—but took heavy losses, being mostly overrun and losing eleven guns. This served to reinforce misgivings about the effectiveness of the towed units, and a report delivered to the Pentagon in December recommended they be phased out in favor of self-propelled units.

It was in France that the allies first began to face the German Panther tank. The superior frontal armor of this tank, along with the Tiger I, Tiger II, and newer Panzerjägers, made the 75mm armed US tanks and tank destroyers less effective. The presence of these German tanks expedited the development and production of US armored vehicles armed with 90mm guns - the first to be introduced being the M36 tank destroyer.

==== Battle of the Bulge ====
In December 1944, and January 1945, the Battle of the Bulge put American ground forces on the operational defensive for the first time in Europe, as a German army group of 24 divisions (including ten panzer divisions with 1,500 armored vehicles) launched a major offensive in the Ardennes forest. The main thrust fell on the 99th and 2nd Infantry divisions which jammed the northern shoulder. A secondary attack hit two overstretched infantry divisions, both with attached towed tank destroyer battalions. (Note: The 820th, attached to the 106th Infantry Division, and the 630th, attached to the 28th Infantry Division.) Once contact was made, the towed guns were unable to reposition themselves or withdraw, and were often overrun by the enemy advance, or simply outflanked by infantry. (Note: Nevertheless, some heroic actions by towed gun crews were notable: "During the afternoon a gunner from the tank destroyer platoon, Pfc. Paul C. Rosenthal, sighted five German tanks and a truck moving north of Lützkampen. Firing his 3-inch gun at 2,000 yards range he destroyed all, tanks and truck; he had used only eighteen rounds of high-explosive and armor-piercing-capped ammunition.") The gun crews, unlike their self-propelled counterparts, had no protection against small-arms fire, and could easily be driven back by a squad of infantry. This lack of mobility was aggravated by the cold wet weather, and the rough conditions, which tended to bog down wheeled vehicles and immobilize fixed guns. Throughout the 1st Army as a whole, three-quarters of the tank destroyers lost were towed rather than self-propelled. One battalion, the 801st, lost 17 towed guns in just two days, while the M10-equipped 644th, which fought alongside it, found ideal opportunities for close-range ambushes and claimed 17 tanks in the same time period. It was clear that the towed guns had proved ineffective and, once the Ardennes offensive had been dealt with, the U.S. War Office approved Eisenhower's January 1945 request to convert all remaining towed units in the theatre to self-propelled guns.

Despite US forces being subjected to a major armored thrust by the Germans in the Ardennes, Tank Destroyer units were not ordered to engage the enemy according to stated doctrine. This was because most units had already been attached to Divisions and had been broken up into smaller infantry support units in a similar fashion to the way separate Tank Battalions had been. Moreover, the loss of lines of communications led to the smaller units being controlled by local commanders rather than being directed by Corps or Army commanders.

Northern Sector - Kampfgruppe Peiper Nevertheless, tank destroyers were to be found throughout the fighting in the Battle of the Bulge, fighting at close range in broken terrain much as they had done in Italy, and, despite their shortcomings, were an essential part of the successful defense. They were widely used during the Ardennes fighting, especially in the northern sector around Malmedy, Spa, Stoumont. Large numbers were involved in several actions against the tanks of Kampfgruppe Peiper, the spearhead of the German 6. Panzer Army, around La Gleize. Elements of the 740th Tank Battalion and 823rd Tank Destroyer Battalion closed from Remouchamps were deployed into defensive positions in front of Stoumont alongside elements of the 3rd Armored division, the 30th Infantry Division and the 82nd Airborne Division.

The battle was also the first major engagement of the M36, with its 90 mm gun; the three battalions employed (the 610th, 703rd, and the 740th Tank Destroyer Battalions) proved highly effective. The M36 was beginning to be introduced in number when the offensive began, and was important throughout the entire Ardennes offensive.

Southern Sector - Bastogne The 705th, equipped with M18s, fought alongside the 101st Airborne at the siege of Bastogne, and played a key role in the defense of the town. Four M-18s, along with some M4 medium tanks and infantry from the 10th Armored division, occupied Noville, just north of Bastogne, and stopped a German armored attack with flank fires, killing 30 heavy tanks (Panthers and Tigers). Once surrounded, the actions of mobile Tank Destroyers within Bastogne was similar to stated doctrine - whenever German attacks threatened the front lines, tank destroyer units (along with US tanks) would rush to the area from behind and intercept invading armor. Because of the shortness of the interior lines within the besieged Bastogne, Tank Destroyer units could be directed very quickly to any location in response to a German attack and prevented any breakthrough.

The battle also highlighted the defensive nature of Tank Destroyer tactics compared to regular armored units. During Team Desobry's initial occupation of Noville, a number of US tanks and tank destroyers were firing into advancing units of the 2nd Panzer Division. However, so many targets were appearing that the M4 tanks from CCB of 10th Armored were staying in place and not moving. By contrast, the M18s from the 609th Tank Destroyer Battalion made frequent changes in location after firing. As a result, tank losses were high while Tank Destroyer losses were comparatively low.

Central Sector - St. Vith The mobile defense of the Battle of St. Vith involved M36 tank Destroyers from the 814th Tank Destroyer Battalion blunting German armored thrusts. Once these thrusts were halted, tank companies from the 7th Armored Division would counter-attack. This tactic allowed a gradual retreat of US forces, ceding only a few kilometers a day, and was instrumental in ruining the plans of advancing German forces.

While the tank destroyers were broadly used in their intended role in the Ardennes—being used as a reserve to counter a massed armored attack – there were two significant differences between their use and the original doctrine. Firstly, there was no central strategic reserve—most tank destroyer battalions were assigned to divisions and kept near the front line, rather than massed in the rear. Secondly, the battalions were rarely committed as a whole; as had become common, they were effectively used as local anti-tank assets, with a platoon or a company assigned to an infantry battalion to bolster its defensive strength.

==== Infantry support ====
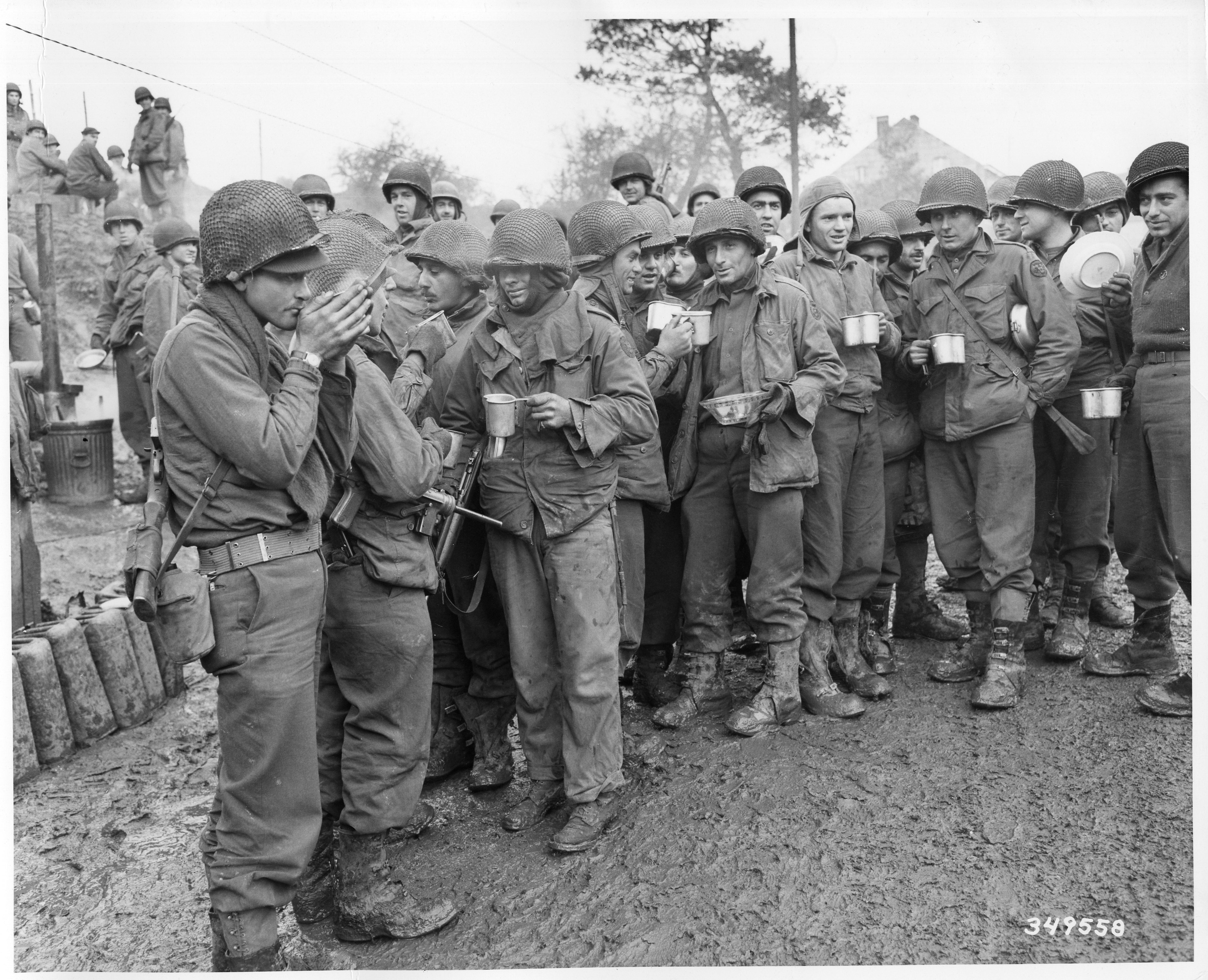
Soldiers of a tank destroyer battalion warm themselves with coffee before going into action against the Germans near Stolberg, Germany. 16 November 1944.

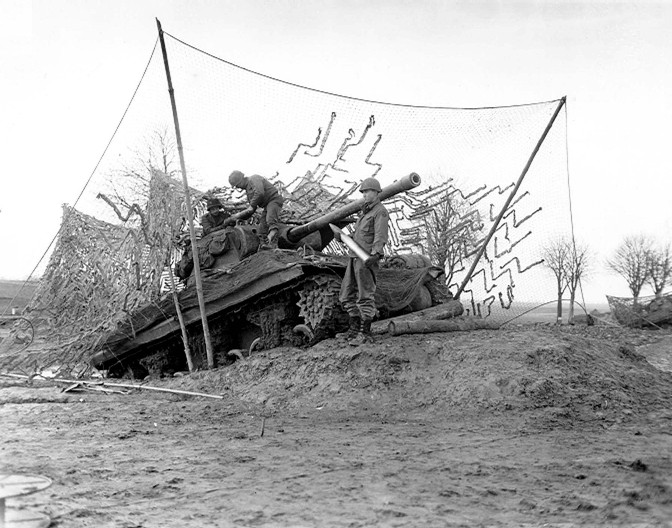
M36 of the 702nd Tank Destroyer Battalion engaged in indirect fire duty, 16 December 1944.

After losses in the Battle of the Bulge, German armored capability in the West was seriously weakened, both through combat losses and through logistical limitations. As such, the tank destroyer battalions spent the closing months of the war as mobile support units, broadly distributed into secondary roles.

As a result, mobile tank destroyer forces generally operated in the same way as the separate tank battalion - being used as direct fire support for infantry operations across a broad front. But while tanks were effective in this role, the tank destroyers were handicapped by their open turrets and thin armor, making them more vulnerable to enemy fire. Moreover, the speed advantage that some tank destroyers had over tanks did not translate into a tactical advantage since such support operations moved at the speed of foot infantry. Infantry units did, however, appreciate the support of tank destroyers in lieu of available tanks.

The remaining towed tank destroyer battalions were generally attached to infantry divisions in more static areas, offering limited direct fire support in the same way as the mobile battalions, or else being attached to divisional artillery to augment indirect fire missions. Most of the towed battalions were gradually refitted with mobile units after the Ardennes and retrained.

By the war's end, infantry division commanders "unanimously agreed that they would prefer to have the support of a tank battalion instead of a tank destroyer battalion." The result was a belief that each infantry division would have its own dedicated battalion of three tank companies, with each company serving each of the three Infantry Regiments. This made the tank destroyer doctrine obsolete, since tanks themselves could also serve in the role of a mobile anti-tank defense against any potential enemy armored thrust, a tactic that had been proven during the Ardennes.

=== Pacific campaign ===
A small number of tank destroyer battalions served in the South-West Pacific; due to the lack of Japanese armor, these were employed almost entirely in the infantry support role, effectively acting as highly mobile artillery. Due to their open-topped turrets, the tank destroyers were far more vulnerable than tanks to close-assault tactics used by the Japanese infantry.

== Tank destroyer forces disbanded ==
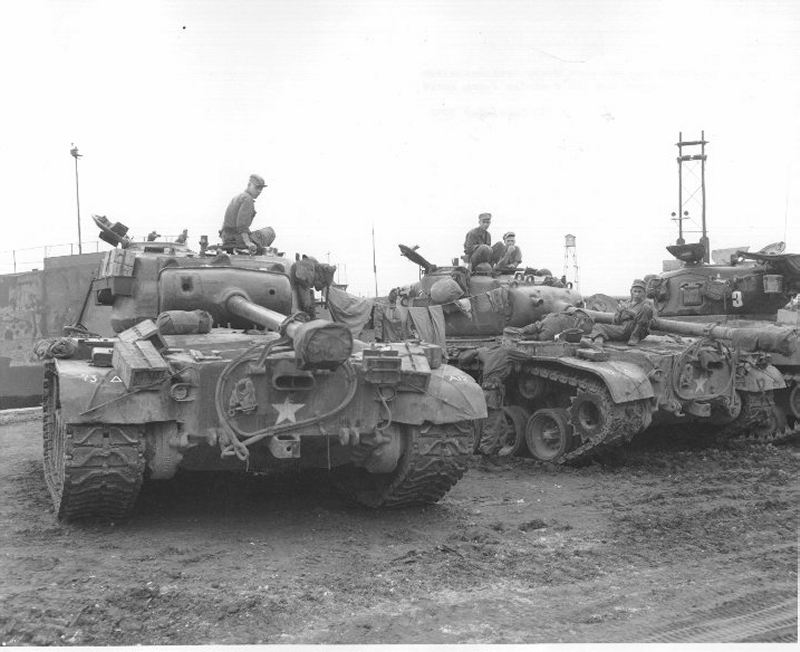
M26 Pershings; a powerful heavy/medium tank which effectively made the specialist tank destroyer obsolete

The US Army finished the war with 63 active tank destroyer battalions, mostly self-propelled.

While tank destroyers had proven their versatility and efficiency in combat, especially in secondary roles, their long-term utility was becoming doubtful by 1945 in light of changes to Army doctrine. Their primary role was to destroy enemy armor, but this role was being usurped by tanks, as had already happened in many other armies. The most powerful tank destroyer to be fielded, the M36, mounted a 90 mm gun; the same armament was carried by the M26 Pershing heavy tank, which was beginning to reach front-line units by the end of hostilities. The M26 was redesignated as a medium tank shortly after the end of the war, becoming the standard vehicle of armored units, and further reducing the need for any specialist anti-tank capacity. In effect, tank destroyers were used just like tanks in many cases. Study of ammunition expenditures shows that tank destroyers in Europe fired about 11 rounds of high-explosive (HE) ammunition for every round of armor-piercing (AP) ammunition, showing that they were used for general support duties far more often than as anti-tank assets.

Moreover, the tactics that underpinned the creation and training of tank destroyer battalions had been undone by the experiences of the Ardennes. Stopping or slowing a blitzkrieg style armored thrust became the responsibility of combined-arms formations, in which infantry, artillery and armor worked together in a mobile defense. While tank destroyers made up an important part of such a defense, it became clear that tanks were better suited because of their all-round ability to counter-attack an enemy, as well as provide a mobile defense, of which they were equal to the tank destroyers (with the exception of the M36). Tank destroyers, being lightly armored, were not suited to a counter-attacking role, and were limited to providing mobile defense only. (Note: During the battle of St. Vith, M36 tank destroyers were used as the base of fire against the advancing German forces, while M4 medium tanks were used in a counter-attacking role. Other battles in the Ardennes saw effective use of tank destroyers in a mobile defense, but when they were used in a counter-attacking role, they were often knocked out or destroyed.) The confusion of the Ardennes battle also resulted in the creation of many ad hoc infantry/armor formations, which was in contrast to the tactic of having tank destroyers in a well-organized formation situated well back from the front lines. The result of this experience led military strategists to conclude that neither static anti-tank positions at the front line, nor mobile battalion-sized tank destroyer units operating in the rear, were the best solution to enemy armored thrusts.

Defensive measures were also informed by the experience of Soviet Deep operation activities on the Eastern Front. Seen especially in the Battle of Kursk, large numbers of Soviet infantry and armor were arranged in various deep echelons to blunt German advances and prevent breakthroughs.

In addition, the Army was reducing its size very rapidly after the end of hostilities; the tank destroyer branch cost the equivalent of three or four full divisions, a definite luxury for a non-essential service. The 1945 General Board report "Study of Organization, Equipment, and Tactical Employment of Tank Destroyer Units" led to the disbandment of Tank Destroyer Battalions, and on 10 November 1945, the Tank Destroyer Center was closed, effectively ending the long-term prospects of the force. The last battalion was de-activated in 1946.

== Vehicles ==
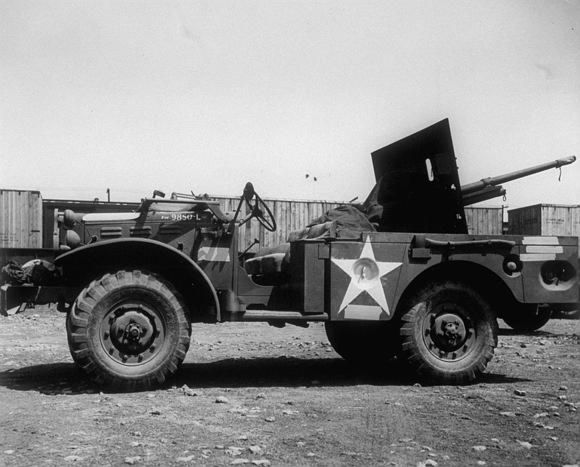
The M6 gun motor carriage was a 37mm gun attached to a Dodge WC52. It was too lightly armed and armored to be an effective tank destroyer.

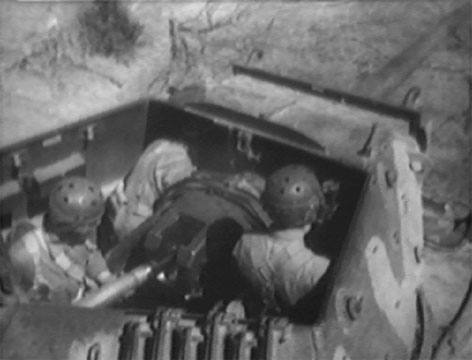
All US tank destroyers were built without turret roofs

US Tank Destroyer doctrine called for mobile units to quickly move to a given position, fire upon enemy armor once they were within range, and then to retreat quickly and take up another position when endangered by enemy fire. Design specifications were thus geared towards speed and mobility, turreted armament capable of defeating enemy armor, and only enough armor to resist small arms fire. This was in contrast to the slower Russian and German tank destroyers, which were heavy armed and armored and were built without turrets.

Some early units were equipped with towed 37 mm guns, but this was quickly abandoned. In addition to the 75 mm-equipped M3 GMC, the original attempt to produce a tank destroyer, a vehicle was developed utilizing the common 37mm anti-tank gun. This was designated the M6 GMC, and was simply a 3/4 ton truck with a 37 mm gun mounted in the rear compartment. A large number were produced, equipping one platoon in each company, but this was abandoned after November 1942 and the vehicles exchanged for M3 GMCs. The M6 saw only limited service in North Africa, and was declared obsolescent in 1943. A few were used by Free French forces in Europe in 1944–45, and the 37mm gun mounts were added to a few M2 halftracks at the unit level.

The deficiencies of the M3 GMC were quickly noted in the 1941 maneuver, and the experience gained allowed a "perfect" advanced tank destroyer to be planned, one which would give a high priority to speed. However, it would take some time to be developed, and a simpler design was looked for as a stopgap. It was decided to take the proven M4 Sherman chassis and give it a modified 3 inch high-velocity anti-aircraft gun; the resulting combination was designated the M10 gun motor carriage. Compromises were made to the vehicle; the turret was left open and lightly armored, keeping the weight low in order to prioritize the speed of the vehicle. A small number were used in North Africa, and it became a standard vehicle thereafter.

The experience of employing the M3, M6, and M10 GMCs in North Africa all fed into the plans for the next generation tank destroyer, which eventually saw service as the M18, nicknamed the "Hellcat". It was equipped with a newly designed 76 mm gun—firing the same shell (from a different cartridge case) as that on the M10—mounted on an all-new chassis. This new design allowed it to be ten tonnes lighter than the M10, which allowed for a remarkable road speed of over 50 mph. However, it was still lightly armored—indeed, it had only half the armor of the M10—and suffered many of the survivability problems of its predecessors. The M18 began to see service in mid-1944.

The final tank destroyer to enter service was the M36. This was a development of the M10 hull with a new turret mounting a 90 mm high-velocity gun, the most powerful anti-tank weapon which would be carried by American forces in Europe. A prototype was originally constructed in 1942, as an experiment, and the design was standardized in June 1944. In July, the European command requested that all M10 battalions be converted to M36s, and the first vehicles reached the front lines in September. It proved more than capable of countering heavy tanks – it was recorded as disabling a Panther tank at 3,200 yards – and its roots in the M10 meant that it possessed greater survivability than the M18. A modification of the M18 upgunned to 90mm was never approved for series production.

=== Design ===
All the US tank destroyers were built without turret roofs. This was done to save weight but also allowed a wider field of view to spot enemy armor and quicker ammunition stowage. The drawbacks included vulnerability to small arms fire (especially from elevated positions), grenades, and splinters from air bursting artillery. Exposure to wind, rain, snow and freezing temperatures also made operations difficult, and many tank destroyer crews placed tarpaulins or other material over the turret to improve both their comfort and their operational effectiveness. Other significant differences between tank destroyers and tanks was that tank destroyers lacked coaxial and bow .30-caliber machine guns. This reduced their ability for infantry support and close-in self defense. Tank destroyers did retain a turret top .50-caliber machine gun as did medium tanks and useful for reconnaissance by fire and self defense.

== Battalion numbering ==
Under the initial scheme outlined in December 1941, when antitank battalions created from assets that came from infantry divisions were converted to tank destroyer battalions, they received a number in the 600 range. Antitank battalions created from armored division assets received numbers in the 700s. Separate infantry antitank battalions (irrespective of the arm of the cadre source) and those created from antitank assets of non-divisional field artillery units received numbers in the 800s. Towed and self-propelled units were often noted by (T) or (SP) being appended to the number.

== See also ==
- Cruiser tank
