= 601st Tank Destroyer Battalion =

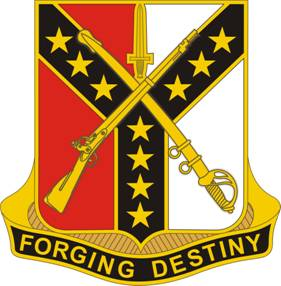
- Active: 15 December 1941 – 1945
- Disbanded: 1945. Reorganized as 332nd Heavy Tank Battalion
- Country: United States
- Allegiance: United States Army
- Part of: Independent unit
- Equipment: M6 Fargo; M3 Gun Motor Carriage; M10 tank destroyer M36 tank destroyer
- Engagements: World War II: Torch; Avalanche; Shingle; Dragoon; Tunisia Campaign
- Decorations: Presidential Unit Citation (2)

The 601st Tank Destroyer Battalion was a battalion of the United States Army active during World War II. It was the first of the newly formed tank destroyer battalions to see combat, and the only one to fight as a "pure" tank destroyer force. It also has the unusual distinction of being one of the few American units to fight in all three major campaigns against Nazi Germany (North Africa, Italy and Northern Europe) and to have participated in four assault landings (Torch, Avalanche, Shingle and Dragoon).

== Formation and North Africa ==
The battalion was formed in 1941 as the 1st Infantry Division Provisional Antitank Battalion, and on 15 December, was redesignated as the 601st Tank Destroyer Battalion, in line with the renaming of the anti-tank force. It deployed to Europe with the 1st Division in 1942, and landed in North Africa as part of Operation Torch. The battalion then saw service in the Tunisia Campaign as an independent unit, equipped with M3 Gun Motor Carriage and M6 Fargo tank destroyers.

On 23 March, it was engaged at the Battle of El Guettar, where it broke up an attack by strong elements of the 10th Panzer Division, destroying 37 tanks and receiving the Presidential Unit Citation. This has the interesting distinction of being the only time a battalion would fight in the way envisaged by the original "tank destroyer" concept, as an organized independent unit opposing an armored force in open terrain.

== Italy ==
Following the North African campaign, it re-equipped with M10 tank destroyers. It landed at Salerno with Operation Avalanche in September 1943, attached to the 36th Infantry Division; at the end of the month it was assigned to the 3rd Infantry Division, with whom it would serve for the remainder of the war. With the 3rd, it landed at Anzio in Operation Shingle in January 1944, crossing the beaches virtually unopposed and taking up positions on the right of the beachhead. It saw action during the push to expand the beachhead and then the bitter defence against a German counterattack; on 29 February, it was employed as part of an active defence by the 3rd Division, repulsing attacks by three separate divisions. It entered Rome in June 1944.

== France and Germany ==
The battalion then landed in southern France as part of Operation Dragoon on 15 August, pushing up through France with the 3rd Division, where Staff Sergeant Clyde Choate of the battalion was awarded the Medal of Honor in October 1944. During the move into southern Germany, on 26 January 1945, two tank destroyers of the battalion participated in the engagement for which Lieutenant Audie Murphy was awarded the Medal of Honor. It saw heavy action at the Colmar Pocket, destroying 18 enemy tanks and receiving a second Presidential Unit Citation, and was re-equipped with the M36 tank destroyer after this. It crossed the Rhine in March, fought in the capture of Nuremberg in April, and finished the war in Bavaria.

== Demobilization ==
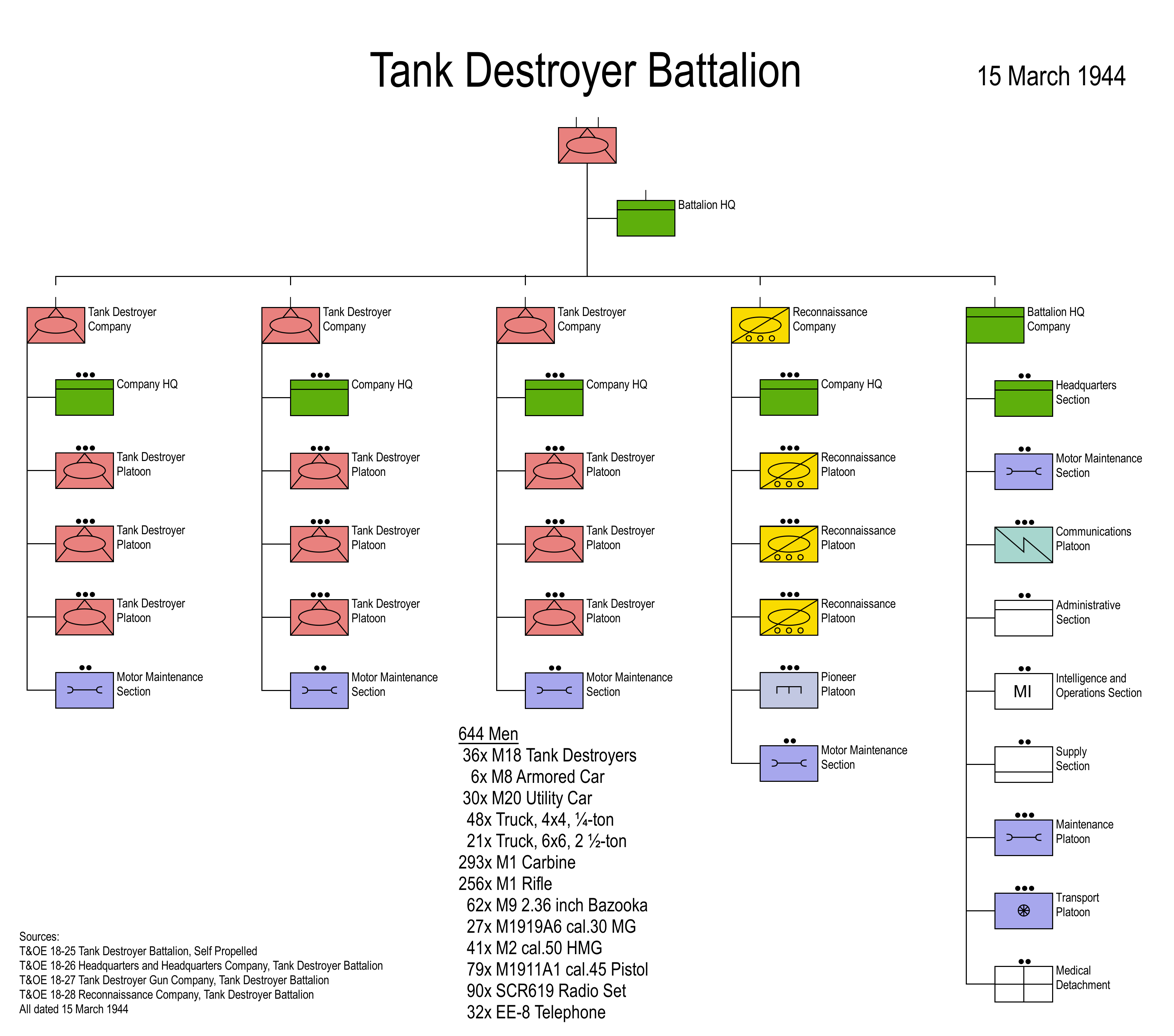
Tank Destroyer Battalion (SP) Structure - March 1944

During demobilization, the tank destroyer battalions were deemed surplus to the requirements of the post-war Army, and the 601st was no exception; it was inactivated on 18 October 1945. It was reformed in the Army Reserve in 1949 and designated the 332d Heavy Tank Battalion, then the 601st Tank Battalion. The battalion was activated in 2004 and designated as the 61st Cavalry Regiment, part of the Regular Army, which now maintains the lineage of the 601st.
