= Mulhausen, Bas-Rhin =

Mulhausen
- Commune
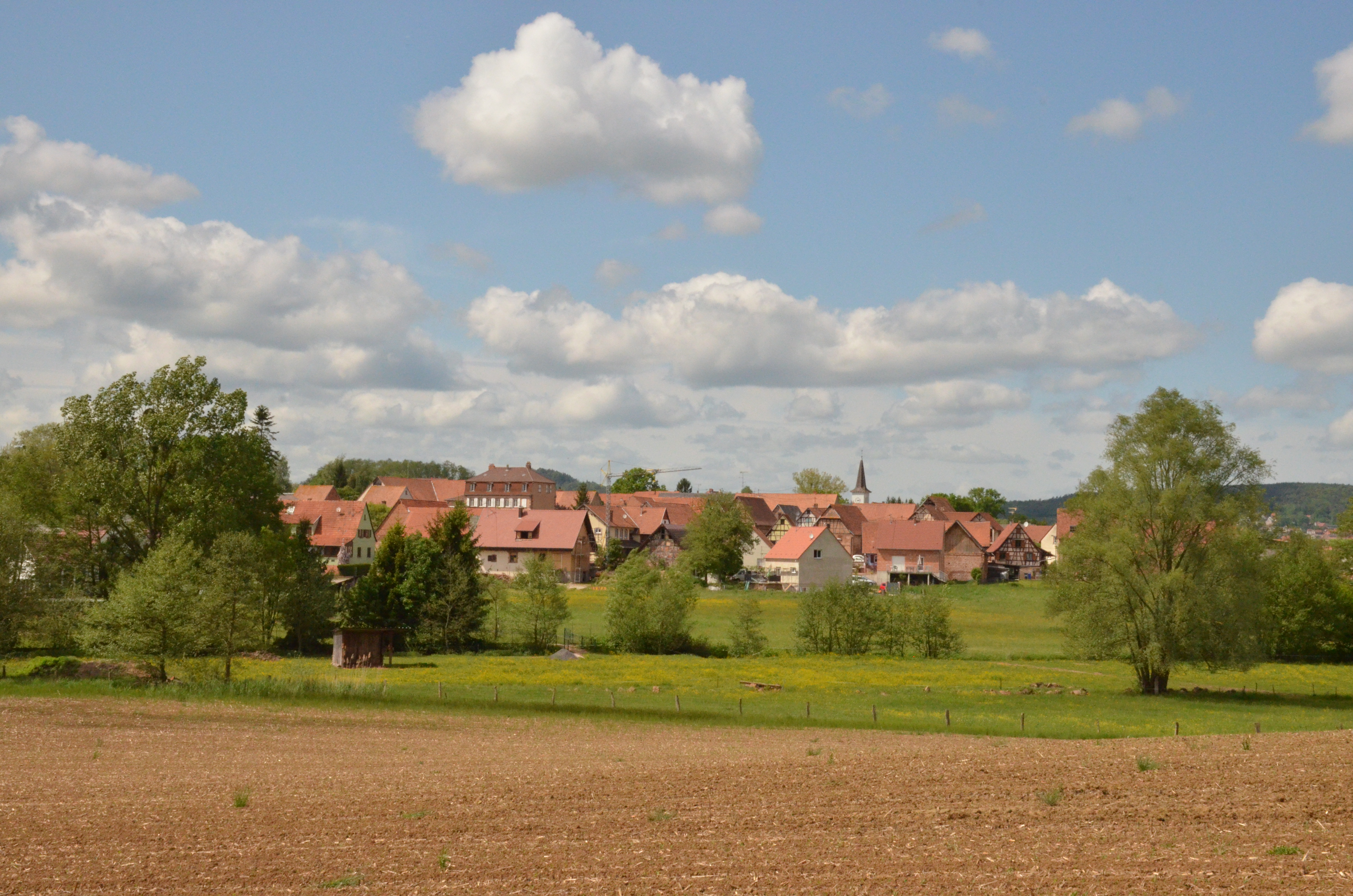
- A general view of Mulhausen

- Coat of arms
- Location of Mulhausen
- Location within France Location within Grand Est
- Coordinates: 48°53′01″N 7°33′15″E
- Country: France
- Region: Grand Est
- Department: Bas-Rhin
- Arrondissement: Saverne
- Canton: Ingwiller

Government
  - Mayor (2020–2026): René Schmitt
- Area^{1}: 4 km^{2} (1.5 sq mi)
- Highest elevation: 237 m (778 ft)
- Lowest elevation: 178 m (584 ft)
- Population (2023): 435
  - Density: 110/km^{2} (280/sq mi)
- Time zone: UTC+01:00 (CET)
  - Summer (DST): UTC+02:00 (CEST)
- INSEE/Postal code: 67307 /67350
- ^{1} French Land Register data, which excludes lakes, ponds, glaciers > 1 km^{2} (0.386 sq mi or 247 acres) and river estuaries.

Mulhausen (French pronunciation: [mylauzən]; German: Mühlhausen) is a commune in the Bas-Rhin department in Grand Est in north-eastern France.

== See also ==
- Communes of the Bas-Rhin department
