= Climbach =

Climbach Klimbàch
- Commune
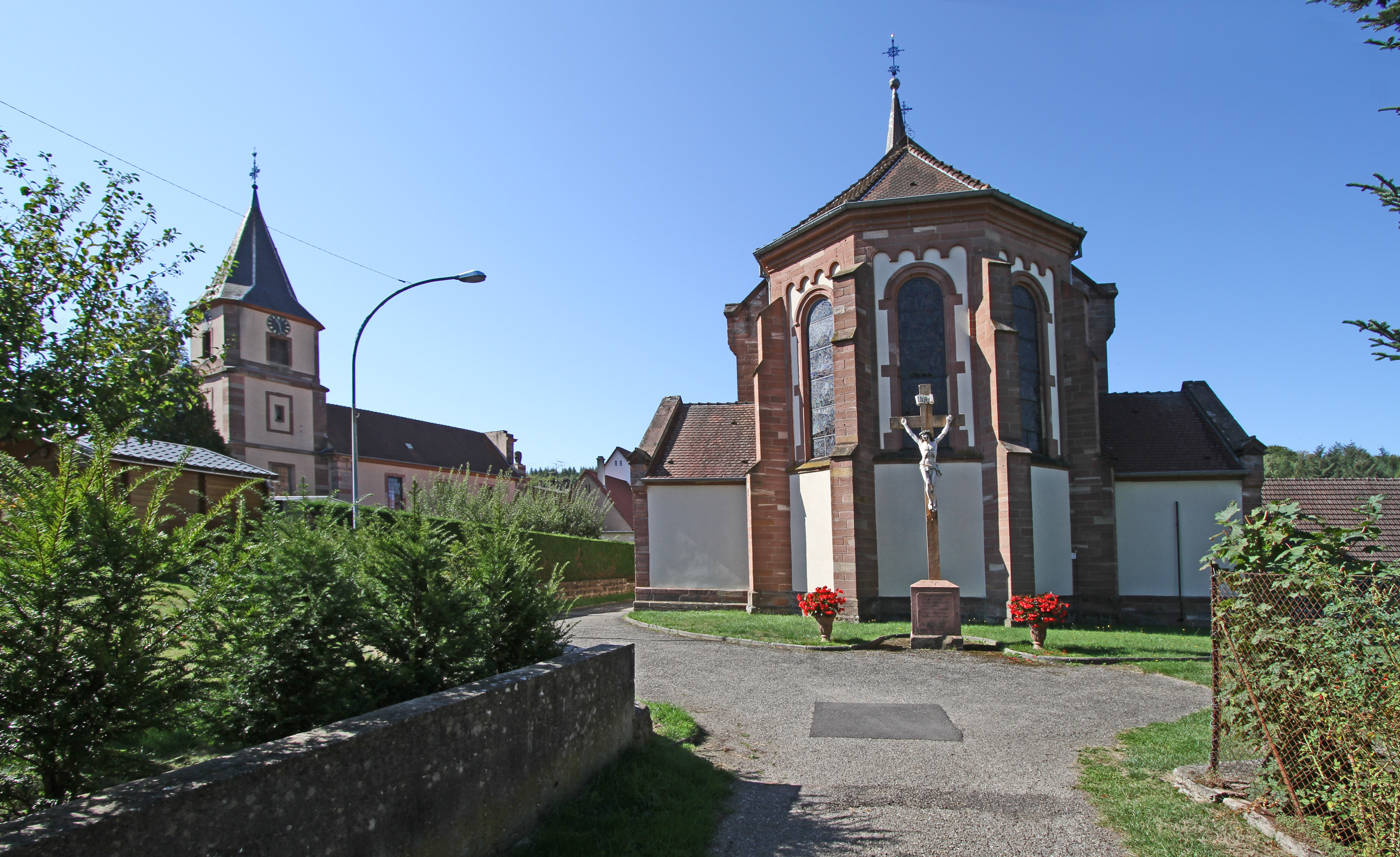
- The Protestant church in Climbach

- Coat of arms
- Location of Climbach
- Location within France Location within Grand Est
- Coordinates: 49°01′05″N 7°51′04″E
- Country: France
- Region: Grand Est
- Department: Bas-Rhin
- Arrondissement: Haguenau-Wissembourg
- Canton: Wissembourg

Government
  - Mayor (2022–2026): Pierre Gillming
- Area^{1}: 7.15 km^{2} (2.76 sq mi)
- Highest elevation: 529 m (1,736 ft)
- Lowest elevation: 240 m (790 ft)
- Population (2023): 479
  - Density: 67.0/km^{2} (174/sq mi)
- Time zone: UTC+01:00 (CET)
  - Summer (DST): UTC+02:00 (CEST)
- INSEE/Postal code: 67075 /67510
- ^{1} French Land Register data, which excludes lakes, ponds, glaciers > 1 km^{2} (0.386 sq mi or 247 acres) and river estuaries.

Climbach (German: Klimbach) is a commune in the Bas-Rhin department in Grand Est in northeastern France.

== Geography ==
Climbach is bordered by Lampertsloch on the south; Wingen and Lembach on the west; by Bobenthal, Germany on the north; and Cleebourg and Wissembourg on the east. Climbach is part of the Northern Vosges Regional Nature Park.

== See also ==
- Communes of the Bas-Rhin department
