= List of tank destroyer units of the United States Army =

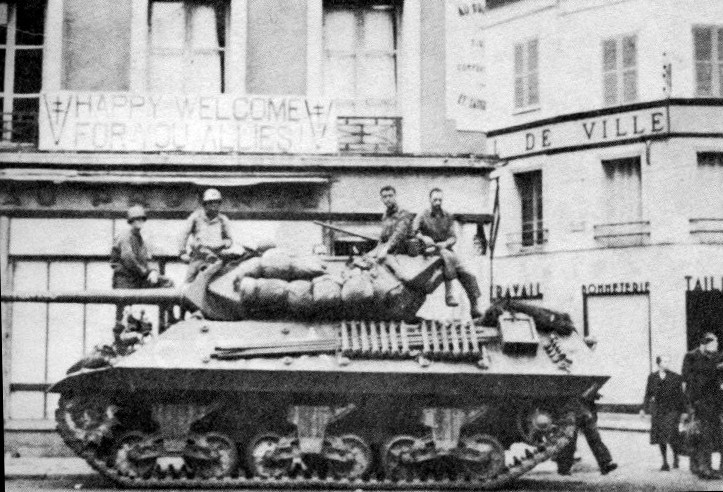
A M10 Wolverine tank destroyer of the 628th Tank Destroyer Battalion, in Dreux, Normandy during August 1944

The United States Army raised a large number of tank destroyer units during World War II.

For most of the war US Army doctrine called for tank destroyers to primarily operate as concentrated tank destroyer battalions during combat. These battalions were to be concentrated in regiment-sized groups and brigades when needed to combat large forces of enemy tanks. However, combat experience in North Africa and Europe demonstrated that units larger than battalions were not needed. Tank destroyers were usually parcelled out to other units, and were rarely concentrated in battalions. The thirteen tank destroyer group headquarters dispatched to Europe never led massed units of tank destroyers, and nor did the 1st Tank Destroyer Brigade.

== Brigades ==
Two tank destroyer brigades were formed in November 1942. The initial role of these units was to oversee the training of the large number of tank destroyer battalions that had been previously formed. The 1st Tank Destroyer Brigade was dispatched to Europe in January 1944 and the 2nd Tank Destroyer Brigade was disbanded in the United States during March that year. In August and September 1944 the 1st Tank Destroyer Brigade commanded the ad-hoc Task Force A which was tasked with seizing ports in Brittany. Its staff subsequently served as advisers in the headquarters of the Third Army.

- 1st Tank Destroyer Brigade
- 2nd Tank Destroyer Brigade

== Groups ==
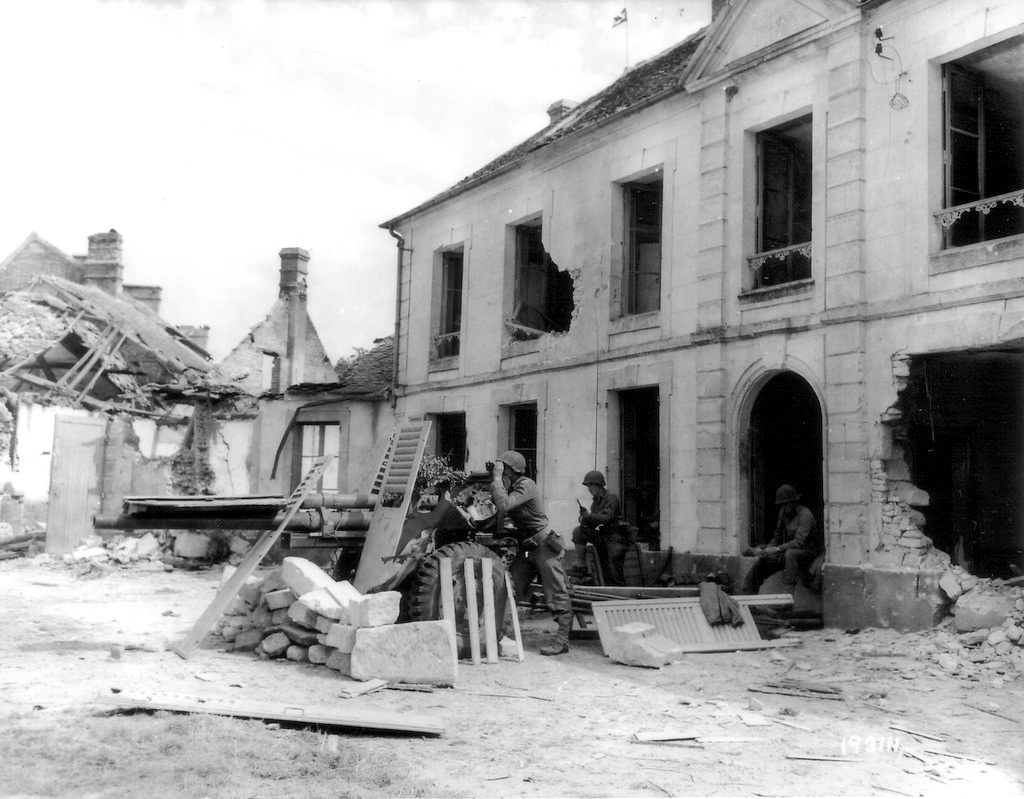
A 607th Tank Destroyer Battalion 3-inch gun M5 towed anti-tank gun at Le Bourg St-Leonard, France during August 1944

Twenty four tank destroyer groups were formed. US Army doctrine called for at least one tank destroyer group to be attached to each corps and army. In practice, tank destroyer battalions were usually attached directly to infantry divisions and there was no need for the group headquarters to command them. The tank destroyer group headquarters which were dispatched overseas were often used as advisers to corps headquarters to provide advice on anti-tank issues, or for other purposes, such as traffic management and controlling units in rear areas. Group headquarters only occasionally undertook combat missions.

Tank Destroyer Groups
Unit	Activated	Inactivated	Notes
1st Tank Destroyer Group	30 March 1942, Camp Bowie, Texas	5 November 1945, Germany	Served as VII Corps traffic control section
2nd Tank Destroyer Group	15 March 1942, Fort Sam Houston, Texas	5 November 1945, Germany	Served as XIX Corps antitank section
3rd Tank Destroyer Group	30 March 1942, Camp Bowie, Texas	22 November 1946, Camp Kilmer, New Jersey	Served as V Corps antitank section
4th Tank Destroyer Group	1 September 1942, Camp Hood, Texas	26 October 1945, Fort Jackson, South Carolina	Served as XX Corps antitank section
5th Tank Destroyer Group	1 September 1942, Camp Hood, Texas	5 December 1945, Camp Shanks, New York	Served as XV Corps antitank section
6th Tank Destroyer Group	1 September 1942, Camp Hood, Texas	1 May 1946, Germany (redesignated 5th Constabulary Regiment)	Served as XIII Corps antitank section
7th Tank Destroyer Group	1 September 1942, Camp Hood, Texas	25 March 1946, Germany	Served as VIII Corps antitank section
8th Tank Destroyer Group	13 October 1942, Camp Hood, Texas	20 October 1945, Camp Bowie, Texas	Served as III Corps antitank section
9th Tank Destroyer Group	13 October 1942, Camp Hood, Texas	1 November 1945, Camp Hood, Texas	Served as XII Corps Advanced Information Center
10th Tank Destroyer Group	13 February 1943, Camp Bowie, Texas	25 May 1944, Camp Howze, Texas	
11th Tank Destroyer Group	20 February 1943, Camp Bowie, Texas	25 May 1944, Camp Howze, Texas	
12th Tank Destroyer Group	27 February 1943, Camp Bowie, Texas	1 November 1945, Camp Hood, Texas	Served as XVI Corps antitank section
13th Tank Destroyer Group	6 March 1943, Camp Bowie, Texas	12 November 1945, Philippines	
14th Tank Destroyer Group	13 March 1943, Camp Bowie, Texas	20 May 1944, Camp Campbell, Kentucky	
15th Tank Destroyer Group	20 March 1943, Camp Bowie, Texas	25 August 1944, Camp Gruber, Oklahoma	
16th Tank Destroyer Group	3 April 1943, Camp Bowie, Texas	10 November 1945, Camp Swift, Texas	Served as XXI Corps antitank section
17th Tank Destroyer Group	10 April 1943, Camp Bowie, Texas	30 August 1944, Camp Swift, Texas	
18th Tank Destroyer Group	17 April 1943, Camp Bowie, Texas	20 February 1945, Fort Knox, Kentucky	
19th Tank Destroyer Group	1 May 1943, Camp Hood, Texas	20 May 1944 Camp Rucker, Alabama	
20th Tank Destroyer Group	8 May 1943, Camp Hood, Texas	23 November 1945, Camp Gruber, Oklahoma	Served as United States Ninth Army Rear Detachment
21st Tank Destroyer Group	15 May 1943, Camp Hood, Texas	22 November 1945, Camp Shelby, Mississippi	
22nd Tank Destroyer Group	5 June 1943, Camp Hood, Texas	20 February 1945, Fort Knox, Kentucky	
23rd Tank Destroyer Group	12 June 1943, Camp Hood, Texas	26 October 1945, Fort Bragg, North Carolina	
24th Tank Destroyer Group	19 June 1943, Camp Hood, Texas	23 December 1944, Camp Hood, Texas	

== Battalions ==
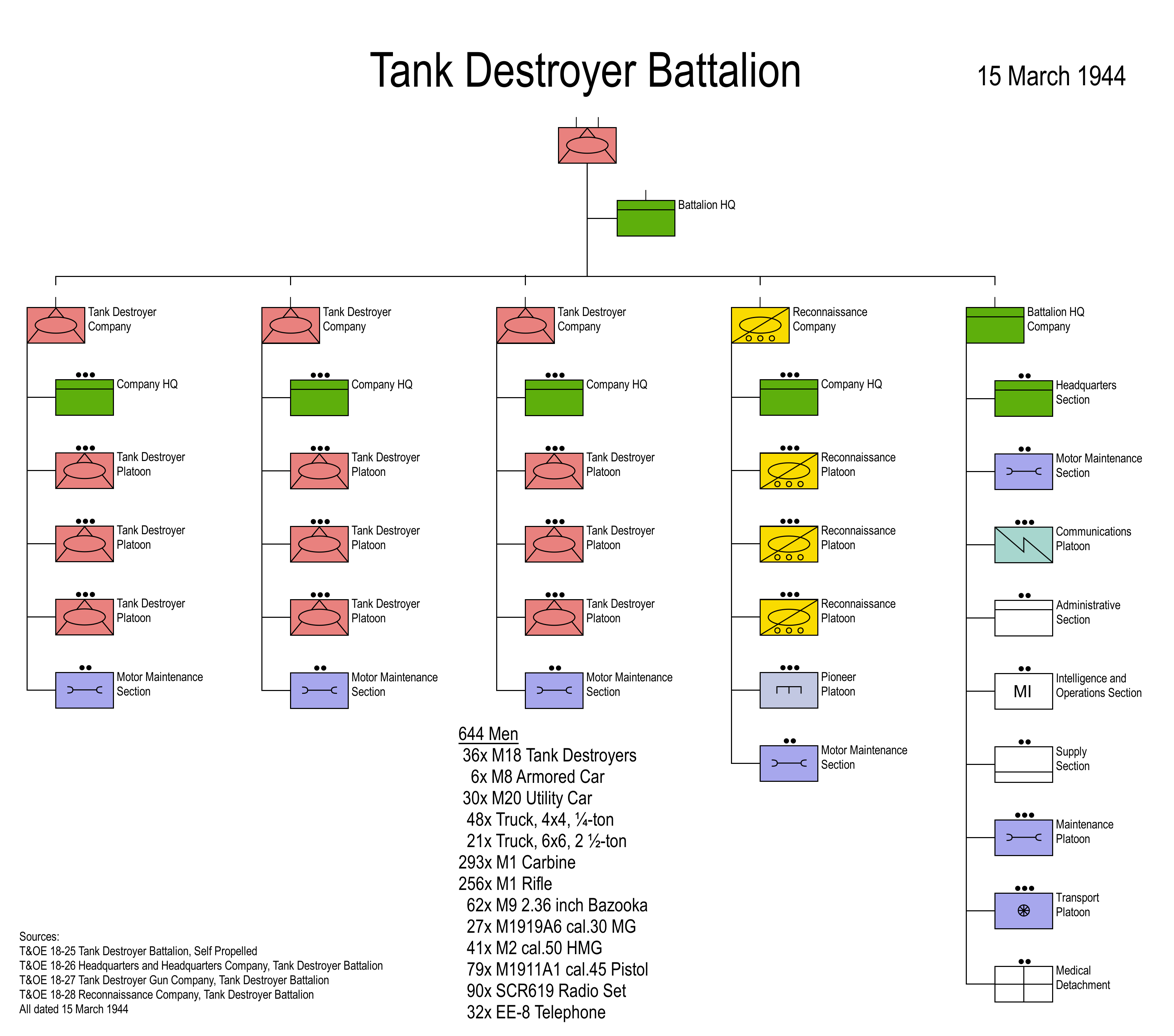
The structure of a US Army tank destroyer battalion equipped with M18 Hellcats as of March 1944

Each tank destroyer battalion was assigned 36 self-propelled or towed anti-tank guns. They also included reconnaissance and anti-aircraft elements. From a high of 220 battalions, the number was reduced in April 1943 to 106 because of concerns over the value of the tank destroyer concept and competing demands for manpower. In late 1943, the War Department received permission to inactivate twenty-five tank destroyer battalions.

The personnel from inactivating battalions were either assigned to existing tank destroyer battalions still in training, or to other types of units. Beginning in 1944, they were also assigned to nine non-divisional infantry regiments or the Replacement and School Command for retraining as infantry replacements. whereupon they were assigned to understrength infantry divisions still stateside, or were sent overseas as individual replacements.

Eleven tank destroyer battalions, one of which was overseas, were converted en bloc to other types of units that were more in demand, such as chemical, tank, armored field artillery or amphibian tractor units. The tank destroyer battalions that had been formed from National Guard infantry antitank battalions and the antitank assets of field artillery units in National Guard infantry divisions and field artillery brigades were allotted to states in 1942, but with the disbandment of the tank destroyer branch after the war, these allotments were withdrawn.

=== Campaign credit key ===
Campaign Credit Key
Number	Campaign
3	Bismarck Archipelago
13	Leyte
14	Luzon
15	New Guinea
17	Papua
21	Western Pacific
23	Algeria-French Morocco
24	Anzio
25	Ardennes-Alsace
26	Central Europe
29	Naples-Foggia
30	Normandy
31	North Apennines
32	Northern France
33	Po Valley
34	Rhineland
35	Rome-Arno
36	Sicily
37	Southern France
38	Tunisia

=== 600s ===
Tank Destroyer Battalions - 600s
Unit	Activated	Inactivated	Campaigns	Vehicles	Notes
601st	15 December 1941, Fort Devens, Massachusetts	18 October 1945, Camp Shanks, New York	23-26, 29, 34-38	M3, M10, M36	Redesignated from 1st Infantry Division Provisional Antitank Battalion
602nd	15 December 1941, Fort Sam Houston, Texas	23 November 1945, Camp Myles Standish, Massachusetts	25, 26, 32, 34	M18	Redesignated from 2nd Infantry Division Provisional Antitank Battalion
603rd	15 December 1941, Fort Lewis, Washington	15 December 1945, Camp Kilmer, New Jersey	24, 26, 30, 32, 34	M18	Redesignated from 3rd Infantry Division Provisional Antitank Battalion
605th	16 December 1941, Fort Custer, Michigan	4 November 1945, Camp Myles Standish, Massachusetts	26, 34	3-inch Gun M5	Redesignated from 5th Infantry Division Provisional Antitank Battalion
606th	16 December 1941, Fort Leonard Wood, Missouri	28 February 1945, Camp Hood, Texas			Redesignated from 6th Infantry Division Provisional Antitank Battalion
607th	9 December 1941, Fort Ord, California	27 October 1945, Camp Kilmer, New Jersey	25, 26, 30, 32, 34	3-inch Gun M5, M36	Redesignated from 7th Infantry Division Provisional Antitank Battalion
608th	15 December 1941, Fort Jackson, South Carolina	20 December 1943, Camp Atterbury, Indiana			Redesignated from 8th Infantry Division Provisional Antitank Battalion; Personnel to 607th, 610th, 643rd, and 807th Tank Destroyer Battalions
609th	15 December 1941, Fort Bragg, North Carolina	13 November 1945, Camp Breckinridge, Kentucky	25, 26, 32, 34	M18	Redesignated from 9th Infantry Division Provisional Antitank Battalion; Additional cadre from 178th Field Artillery Regiment
610th	10 April 1942, Camp Barkeley, Texas	7 December 1945, Camp Myles Standish, Massachusetts	25, 26, 32, 34	3-inch Gun M5, M36	
611th	1 May 1942, Camp Polk, Louisiana	20 February 1945, Fort Knox, Kentucky			
612th	25 June 1942, Camp Swift, Texas	27 October 1945, Camp Kilmer, New Jersey	25, 26, 30, 32, 34	3-inch Gun M5, M18	
614th (segregated)	25 July 1942, Camp Carson, Colorado	31 January 1946, Camp Kilmer, New Jersey	25, 26, 32, 34	3-inch Gun M5	
626th	15 December 1941, Camp Edwards, Massachusetts	20 December 1943, Camp Gordon, Georgia			Redesignated from 26th Division Provisional Antitank Battalion; Personnel to 607th, 630th, 691st, 692nd, 774th, 806th, and 822nd Tank Destroyer Battalions, among others
627th	15 December 1941, Fort McClellan, Alabama	10 April 1945, Hawaii			Cadre from personnel of 27th Division
628th	15 December 1941, Fort Indiantown Gap, Pennsylvania	14 November 1945, Camp Myles Standish, Massachusetts	25, 26, 32, 34	M10, M36	Redesignated from 28th Division Provisional Antitank Battalion
629th	15 December 1941, Fort George G. Meade, Maryland	3 December 1945, Camp Kilmer, New Jersey	25, 26, 30, 32, 34	M10, M36	Cadre from personnel of 29th Division
630th	15 December 1941, Fort Jackson, South Carolina	31 March 1946, Camp Kilmer, New Jersey	25, 26, 30, 32, 34	3-inch Gun M5, M36	Redesignated from 30th Division Provisional Antitank Battalion; Additional cadre from 128th Field Artillery Regiment
631st	15 December 1941, Camp Blanding, Florida	15 December 1945, Camp Kilmer, New Jersey	25, 26, 32, 34	3-inch Gun M5, M36	Cadre from personnel of 31st Division
632nd	15 December 1941, Camp Livingston, Louisiana	1 January 1946, Camp Stoneman, California	13, 14, 15	M10	Redesignated from 32nd Division Provisional Antitank Battalion
633rd	16 December 1941, Camp Forrest, Tennessee	30 October 1945, Fort Bragg, North Carolina	26	M18	Cadre from personnel of 33rd Division
634th	16 December 1941, Camp Claiborne, Louisiana	29 November 1945, Camp Kilmer, New Jersey	25, 26, 30, 32, 34	M10	Redesignated from 34th Division Provisional Antitank Battalion
635th	15 December 1941, Camp Joseph T. Robinson, Arkansas	27 December 1945, Camp Myles Standish, Massachusetts	25, 26, 30, 32, 34	3-inch Gun M5	Redesignated from 35th Division Provisional Antitank Battalion
636th	15 December 1941, Camp Bowie, Texas	7 December 1945, Camp Myles Standish, Massachusetts	24-26, 29, 34, 37	M10, M36	Redesignated from 36th Division Provisional Antitank Battalion
637th	19 December 1941, Camp Shelby, Mississippi	25 January 1946, Japan	14	M18	Redesignated from 37th Division Provisional Antitank Battalion
638th	15 December 1941, Camp Shelby, Mississippi	7 November 1945, Fort Benning, Georgia	25, 26, 32, 34	M18	Redesignated from 38th Division Provisional Antitank Battalion
640th	19 December 1941, Camp San Luis Obispo, California	13 January 1946, Camp Anza, California	3, 14, 20	3-inch Gun M5, M10	Cadre from personnel of 40th Division
641st	18 December 1941, Fort Lewis, Washington	24 June 1944, New Guinea	3, 15, 17		Cadre from personnel of 41st Division; Redesignated 98th Chemical Battalion
643rd	15 December 1941, Camp Blanding, Florida	6 November 1945, Camp Anza, California	25, 26, 34	3-inch Gun M5, M18	Redesignated from 43rd Division Provisional Antitank Battalion
644th	15 December 1941, Fort Dix, New Jersey	3 December 1945, Camp Patrick Henry, Virginia	25, 26, 30, 32, 34	M10	Redesignated from 44th Division Provisional Antitank Battalion
645th	15 December 1941, Camp Barkeley, Texas	30 October 1945, Camp Myles Standish, Massachusetts	24-26, 29, 34, 35, 37	M10, M36	Redesignated from 45th Division Provisional Antitank Battalion
646th (segregated)	15 May 1942, Fort Huachuca, Arizona	1 May 1944, Fort Indiantown Gap, Pennsylvania			
647th	6 March 1943, Camp Bowie, Texas	12 May 1944, Camp Van Dorn, Mississippi			Personnel to 125th Infantry Regiment for retraining as infantry replacements
648th	6 March 1943, Camp Bowie, Texas	16 December 1945, Camp Kilmer, New Jersey	26, 34	3-inch Gun M5, M18	
649th (segregated)	31 March 1943, Camp Bowie, Texas	24 April 1944, Hampton Roads Port of Embarkation, Virginia			Personnel to Army Service Forces
650th	13 March 1943, Camp Bowie, Texas	25 March 1944, Camp Bowie, Texas			Redesignated 425th Armored Field Artillery Battalion
651st	13 March 1943, Camp Bowie, Texas	29 May 1944, Camp Howze, Texas			Personnel to 140th Infantry Regiment for retraining as infantry replacements
652nd	20 March 1943, Camp Bowie, Texas	16 September 1945, Camp Shelby, Mississippi			
653rd	20 March 1943, Camp Bowie, Texas	10 May 1944, Camp Van Dorn, Mississippi			Personnel to 140th Infantry Regiment for retraining as infantry replacements
654th	15 December 1941, Fort Benning, Georgia	13 November 1945, Camp Patrick Henry, Virginia	25, 26, 30, 32, 34	M10, M36	
655th	3 April 1943, Camp Bowie, Texas	10 April 1944, Camp Hood, Texas			Personnel to 493rd and 869th Ordnance Heavy Automotive Maintenance Companies
656th	15 December 1941, Fort Benning, Georgia	1 November 1946, Camp Campbell, Kentucky	26, 34	M18, M36	
657th	10 April 1943, Camp Bowie, Texas	10 April 1944, Camp Hood, Texas			Personnel to 493rd and 869th Ordnance Heavy Automotive Maintenance Companies
658th	10 April 1943, Camp Bowie, Texas	15 April 1944, Fort Ord, California			Redesignated 658th Amphibian Tractor Battalion
659th (segregated)	15 May 1943, Camp Hood, Texas	1 December 1944, Camp Livingston, Louisiana			Personnel to Replacement and School Command for retraining as infantry replacements
660th	17 April 1943, Camp Bowie, Texas	25 May 1944, Camp Carson, Colorado			Personnel to 201st Infantry Regiment for retraining as infantry replacements
661st	17 April 1943, Camp Bowie, Texas	10 February 1946, Camp Hood, Texas	26, 34	M18	
662nd	1 May 1943, Camp Hood, Texas	17 December 1944, Fort Knox, Kentucky			Redesignated 662nd Tank Battalion
663rd	1 May 1943, Camp Hood, Texas	25 March 1944, Camp Bowie, Texas			Redesignated 426th Armored Field Artillery Battalion
664th	8 May 1943, Camp Hood, Texas	12 May 1944, Camp Maxey, Texas			Personnel to 125th Infantry Regiment for retraining as infantry replacements
665th	8 May 1943, Camp Hood, Texas	12 May 1944, Camp Maxey, Texas			Personnel to 125th Infantry Regiment for retraining as infantry replacements
666th	15 May 1943, Camp Hood, Texas	25 March 1944, Camp Maxey, Texas			Redesignated 427th Armored Field Artillery Battalion
667th	5 June 1943, Camp Hood, Texas	3 June 1944, Camp Maxey, Texas			Personnel to 125th Infantry Regiment for retraining as infantry replacements
668th	5 June 1943, Camp Hood, Texas	25 March 1944, Camp Maxey, Texas			Redesignated 427th Armored Field Artillery Battalion
669th (segregated)	19 June 1943, Camp Hood, Texas	15 November 1944, Fort Huachuca, Arizona			Personnel to 372nd Infantry Regiment for retraining as infantry replacements
670th	12 June 1943, Camp Hood, Texas	10 April 1945, Hawaii		M18	
671st	12 June 1943, Camp Hood, Texas	17 January 1946, Camp Anza, California		M18	
672nd	19 June 1943, Camp Hood, Texas	15 April 1944, Fort Ord, California			Redesignated 672nd Amphibian Tractor Battalion
679th (segregated)	26 June 1943, Camp Hood, Texas	27 October 1945, Camp Kilmer, New Jersey	31, 33	3-inch Gun M5	
691st	15 December 1941, Fort Bliss, Texas	13 April 1946, Camp Kilmer, New Jersey	25, 26, 30, 32, 34	3-inch Gun M5, M36	
692nd	10 April 1942, Camp Gordon, Georgia	8 February 1946, Camp Swift, Texas	25, 26, 34	3-inch Gun M5, M36	

=== 700s ===
Tank Destroyer Battalions - 700s
Unit	Activated	Inactivated	Campaigns	Vehicles	Notes
701st	15 December 1941, Fort Knox, Kentucky	29 October 1945, Fort Leonard Wood, Missouri	23, 29, 31, 33, 35, 38	M3, M10	Cadre from 1st Armored Division
702nd	15 December 1941, Fort Benning, Georgia	3 October 1945, Camp Myles Standish, Massachusetts	25, 26, 30, 32, 34	M10, M36	Cadre from 2nd Armored Division
703rd	15 December 1941, Camp Polk, Louisiana	3 January 1946, Camp Kilmer, New Jersey	25, 26, 30, 32, 34	M10, M36	Cadre from 3rd Armored Division
704th	15 December 1941, Pine Camp, New York	24 October 1945, Camp Shanks, New York	25, 26, 30, 32, 34	M18	Cadre from 4th Armored Division
705th	15 December 1941, Fort Knox, Kentucky	16 November 1945, Camp Patrick Henry, Virginia	25, 26, 30, 32, 34	M18	Cadre from 58th Armored Field Artillery Battalion
706th	30 March 1942, Camp Chaffee, Arkansas	14 April 1944 Fort Ord, California			Personnel to 539th, 540th, and 720th Amphibian Tractor Battalions
771st	15 December 1941, Fort Ethan Allen, Vermont	1 December 1945, Camp Kilmer, New Jersey	26, 32, 34	M10, M36	Cadre from 71st Field Artillery Brigade Provisional Antitank Battalion (186th and 187th Field Artillery Regiments)
772nd	16 December 1941, Fort Leonard Wood, Missouri	24 December 1945, Camp Shelby, Mississippi	25, 26, 34	3-inch Gun M5, M36	Cadre from 72nd Field Artillery Brigade Provisional Antitank Battalion (119th, 177th, and 182nd Field Artillery Regiments)
773rd	15 December 1941, Camp Shelby, Mississippi	23 October 1945, Camp Patrick Henry, Virginia	25, 26, 32, 34	M10, M36	Cadre from 73rd Field Artillery Brigade Provisional Antitank Battalion (144th, 160th, and 190th Field Artillery Regiments)
774th	15 December 1941, Camp Blanding, Florida	29 October 1945, Camp Kilmer, New Jersey	25, 26, 30, 32, 34	3-inch Gun M5, M36	Cadre from 74th Field Artillery Brigade Provisional Antitank Battalion (172nd and 174th Field Artillery Regiments)
775th	16 December 1941, Camp Forrest, Tennessee	15 April 1944, Fort Ord, California			Redesignated 728th Amphibian Tractor Battalion. Cadre from 75th Field Artillery Brigade Provisional Antitank Battalion (168th, 181st, and 191st Field Artillery Regiments)
776th	20 December 1941, Fort Lewis, Washington	25 November 1945, Camp Kilmer, New Jersey	25, 26, 29, 34, 35, 38	M10, M36	Cadre from 76th Field Artillery Brigade Provisional Antitank Battalion (183rd and 188th Field Artillery Regiments)
795th (segregated)	16 December 1941, Fort Custer, Michigan	24 April 1944, Hampton Roads Port of Embarkation, Virginia			Cadre from antitank troops of the 184th Field Artillery Regiment

=== 800s ===
Tank Destroyer Battalions - 800s
Unit	Activated	Inactivated	Campaigns	Vehicles	Notes
801st	15 December 1941, Fort Benning, Georgia	29 November 1945, Camp Myles Standish, Massachusetts	25, 26, 30, 32, 34	3-inch Gun M5, M18	Cadre from 101st Infantry Antitank Battalion (cadre from Headquarters, Headquarters Company, Medical Detachment, and Troops B and K, 121st Cavalry Regiment, New York National Guard)
802nd	15 December 1941, Camp Shelby, Mississippi	1 December 1945, Camp Kilmer, New Jersey	25, 26, 30, 32, 34	3-inch Gun M5, M36	Cadre from 102nd Infantry Antitank Battalion (cadre from Headquarters and Headquarters Detachment, 3rd Battalion, and Companies I, K, and L, 14th Infantry Regiment, New York National Guard)
803rd	15 December 1941, Fort Lewis, Washington	1 December 1945, Camp Kilmer, New Jersey	25, 26, 30, 32, 34	M10, M36	Cadre from 103rd Infantry Antitank Battalion (cadre from new units, Headquarters Troop, 21st Cavalry Division, and 41st Tank Company, Washington National Guard)
804th	15 December 1941, Camp San Luis Obispo, California	10 December 1945, Camp Hood, Texas	31, 33, 35	M10	Cadre from 104th Antitank Battalion (cadre from new units and Battery A, 1st Battalion, 158th Field Artillery Regiment, New Mexico National Guard)
805th	15 December 1941, Fort George G. Meade, Maryland	2 November 1945, Camp Hood, Texas	24, 29, 31, 33, 35, 38	M3, 3-inch Gun M5, M18	Cadre from 105th Infantry Antitank Battalion (cadre from Headquarters Troop and Headquarters Detachment, 22nd Cavalry Division, Headquarters, Headquarters and Service Troop and Troops B and C, 122nd Medical Squadron, Headquarters and Headquarters Detachment and Troops B and C, 122nd Quartermaster Squadron, and Antitank Platoon, Headquarters Company, 112th Infantry Regiment, Pennsylvania National Guard)
806th	15 March 1942, Camp Gordon, Georgia	12 January 1946, Camp Anza, California	34	M10	Cadre from 638th Tank Destroyer Battalion
807th	11 March 1942, Camp Cooke, California	22 September 1945, Camp Hood, Texas	25, 26, 34	3-inch Gun M5, M18	Cadre from 826th Tank Destroyer Battalion
808th	27 March 1942, Camp Joseph T. Robinson, Arkansas	26 September 1945, Camp Rucker, Alabama	26, 34	3-inch Gun M5, M36	
809th	14 March 1942, Camp Forrest, Tennessee	8 September 1945, Camp Bowie, Texas	26, 34	M18, M36	
810th	18 March 1942, Camp Forrest, Tennessee	20 December 1943, Camp Forrest, Tennessee			Personnel to other tank destroyer battalions
811th	10 April 1942, Camp Gordon, Georgia	20 February 1946, Camp Butner, North Carolina	25, 26, 34	M18	
812th	10 April 1942, Camp Gordon, Georgia	28 November 1944, Fort Jackson, South Carolina			Redesignated 812th Tank Battalion
813th	15 December 1941, Fort Bragg, North Carolina	25 November 1945, Camp Myles Standish, Massachusetts	25, 26, 30, 32, 34, 35, 38	M3, M10, M36	Cadre from 112th Field Artillery Regiment
814th	1 May 1942, Camp Polk, Louisiana	20 September 1945, Germany	25, 26, 32, 34	M10, M36	
815th	11 May 1942, Camp Cooke, California	27 September 1944, New Guinea	15	3-inch Gun M5	Personnel to 112th Cavalry Regiment
816th	11 May 1942, Camp Cooke, California	20 February 1945, Fort Knox, Kentucky			
817th	1 June 1942, Camp Chaffee, Arkansas	4 April 1946, Camp Kilmer, New Jersey	26, 32, 34	3-inch Gun M5, M18	Cadre from 776th Tank Destroyer Battalion
818th	15 December 1941, Fort Sill, Oklahoma	30 October 1945, Camp Shanks, New York	25, 26, 30, 32, 34	M19, M36	Enlisted cadre from 18th Provisional Antitank Battalion (77th and 142nd Field Artillery Regiments and 71st, 72nd, and 83rd Field Artillery Battalions); officer cadre from 77th, 142nd, and 349th Field Artillery Regiments
819th	1 June 1942, Camp Chaffee, Arkansas	2 November 1945, Palau	21	M10	Cadre from 705th Tank Destroyer Battalion
820th	25 June 1942, Camp Swift, Texas	8 September 1945, Camp Swift, Texas	25, 26, 34	3-inch Gun M5, M18	
821st	25 July 1942, Camp Carson, Colorado	17 February 1946, Camp Kilmer, New Jersey	26, 30, 32, 34	3-inch Gun M5, M10	Cadre from 630th, 803rd, and 818th Tank Destroyer Battalions
822nd	25 July 1942, Camp Carson, Colorado	8 September 1945, Camp Gruber, Oklahoma	26, 34	3-inch Gun M5, M18	
823rd	25 July 1942, Camp Carson, Colorado	24 October 1945, Camp Shanks, New York	25, 26, 30, 32, 34	3-inch Gun M5, M10	Cadre from 638th, 804th, and 846th Tank Destroyer Battalions
824th	10 August 1942, Camp Gruber, Oklahoma	11 September 1945, Fort Jackson, South Carolina	25, 26, 34	3-inch Gun M5, M18	
825th	10 August 1942, Camp Gruber, Oklahoma	9 March 1946, Camp Kilmer, New Jersey	25, 26, 32, 34	3-inch Gun M5	Cadre from 774th Tank Destroyer Battalion
826th	21 December 1941, Camp Roberts, California	18 April 1944, Fort Ord, California			Redesignated 826th Amphibian Tractor Battalion
827th (segregated)	24 April 1942, Camp Forrest, Tennessee	2 December 1945, Camp Patrick Henry, Virginia	25, 26, 34	M18	Cadre from 4th Cavalry Brigade
828th (segregated)	30 May 1942, Fort Knox, Kentucky	7 December 1943, Fort Huachuca, Arizona			Personnel to 150th, 373rd, 390th, 393rd and 394th Quartermaster Truck Companies
829th (segregated)	25 July 1942, Camp Gruber, Oklahoma	27 March 1944, Camp Hood, Texas			Personnel to Eighth Service Command
846th (segregated)	15 December 1941, Camp Livingston, Louisiana	13 December 1943, Camp Swift, Texas		M18	Cadre from 46th Field Artillery Brigade; Personnel to VIII Corps, Third Army
893rd	15 December 1941, Fort George G. Meade, Maryland	13 February 1946, New York Port of Embarkation	25, 26, 30, 32, 34	M10	Cadre from 93rd Infantry Antitank Battalion (cadre from 3rd Battalion, 34th Infantry Regiment)
894th	15 December 1941, Fort Benning, Georgia	8 September 1945, Italy	29, 31, 33, 35, 38	M3, M10	Cadre from 94th Infantry Antitank Battalion
899th	15 December 1941, Fort Lewis, Washington	27 December 1945, Camp Kilmer, New Jersey	25, 26, 30, 32, 34, 35, 38	M10, M36	Cadre from 99th Infantry Antitank Battalion (cadre from 15th Infantry Regiment)

== Training units ==
A number of units responsible for tank destroyer doctrine development and training were also established. They included:

- Tank Destroyer Center (originally formed as the Tank Destroyer Command)
- Tank Destroyer Board
- Tank Destroyer School
- Tank Destroyer Unit Training Center
- Tank Destroyer Training Brigade
- Tank Destroyer Replacement Training Center
- Tank Destroyer Basic Unit Training Center

== See also ==
- List of armored and cavalry regiments of the United States Army
