= 628th Tank Battalion (United States) =

- Country: United States
- Branch: United States Army

The 628th Tank Battalion was an armored battalion of the United States Army active during the Cold War, formed in 1946 and merged into the 103rd Armor Regiment in 1959.

It was formed in May 1946 in the Pennsylvania National Guard by redesignating the 628th Tank Destroyer Battalion, then organized in May 1949 as part of the 28th Infantry Division.

The battalion, along with the rest of the 28th Infantry Division, was activated for service due to the Korean War in September 1950; after training, the division was placed under the command of Seventh Army and stationed in West Germany. It was stood down in June 1954, and the battalion returned to the National Guard.

In 1959, under the new Combat Arms Regimental System, the battalion joined with elements of the 110th Infantry Regiment and the 108th and 166th Field Artillery Battalions to form the 103rd Armor Regiment.
