= Order of the White Lion =

Highest state decoration of the Czech Republic

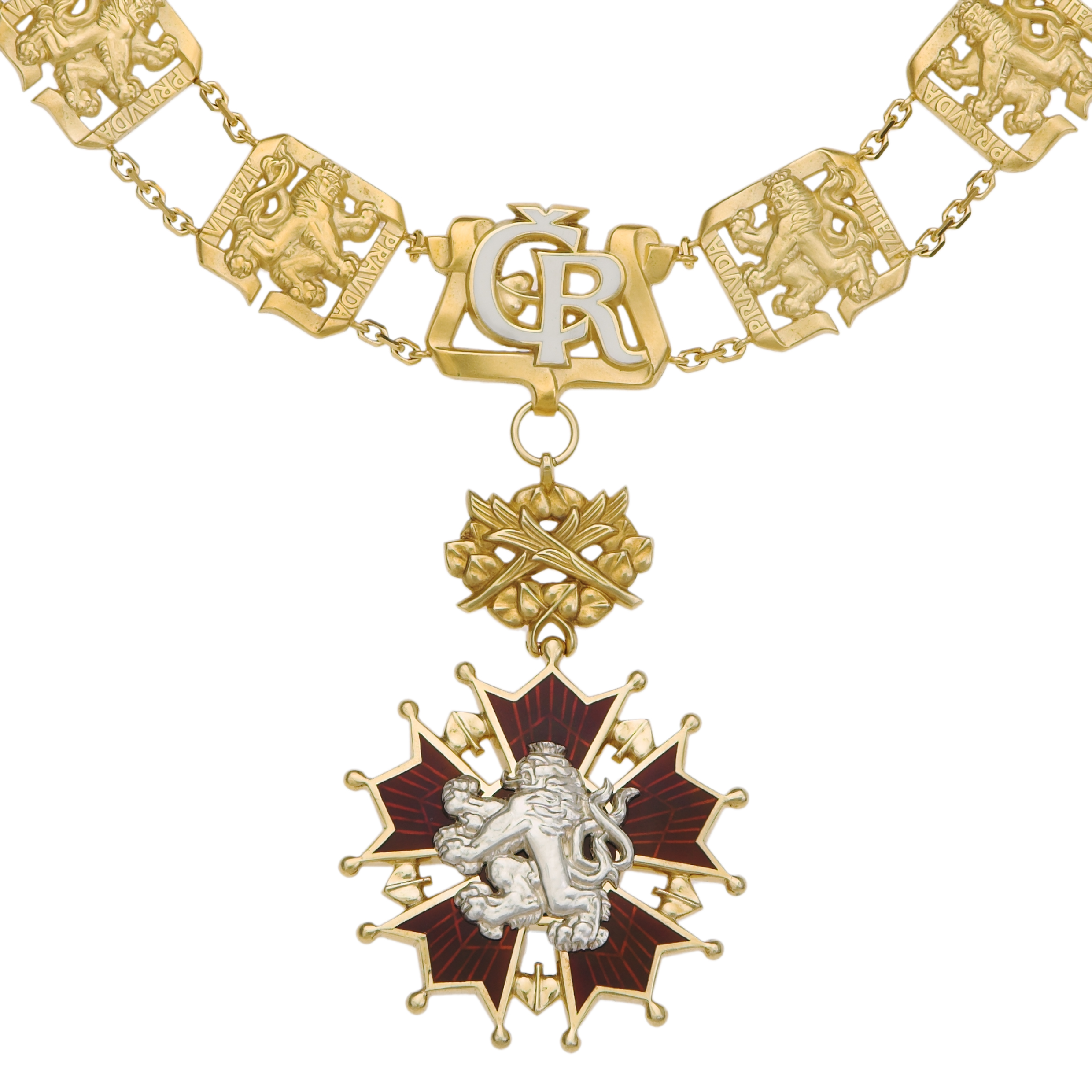
- Collar of the Order of the White Lion

Awarded by the President of the Czech Republic
- Type: Order
- Motto: PRAVDA VÍTĚZÍ (Truth Prevails)
- Awarded for: Outstanding services to the Czech Republic
- Status: Currently constituted
- Sovereign: Petr Pavel
- Grades: 1st Class with Collar; 1st Class; 2nd Class; 3rd Class; 4th Class; 5th Class

Precedence
- Next (higher): None (highest)
- Next (lower): Order of Tomáš Garrigue Masaryk
- Ribbon bar of the Order of the White Lion

The Order of the White Lion (Czech: Řád Bílého lva) is the highest order of the Czech Republic. It continues a Czechoslovak order of the same name created in 1922 as an award for foreigners (Czechoslovakia had no civilian decoration for its citizens in the 1920s and 1930s). It was inspired by the Czech Nobility Cross created in 1814 by the Emperor and King Francis II and awarded to 37 Bohemian noblemen.

== 1922–1961 ==
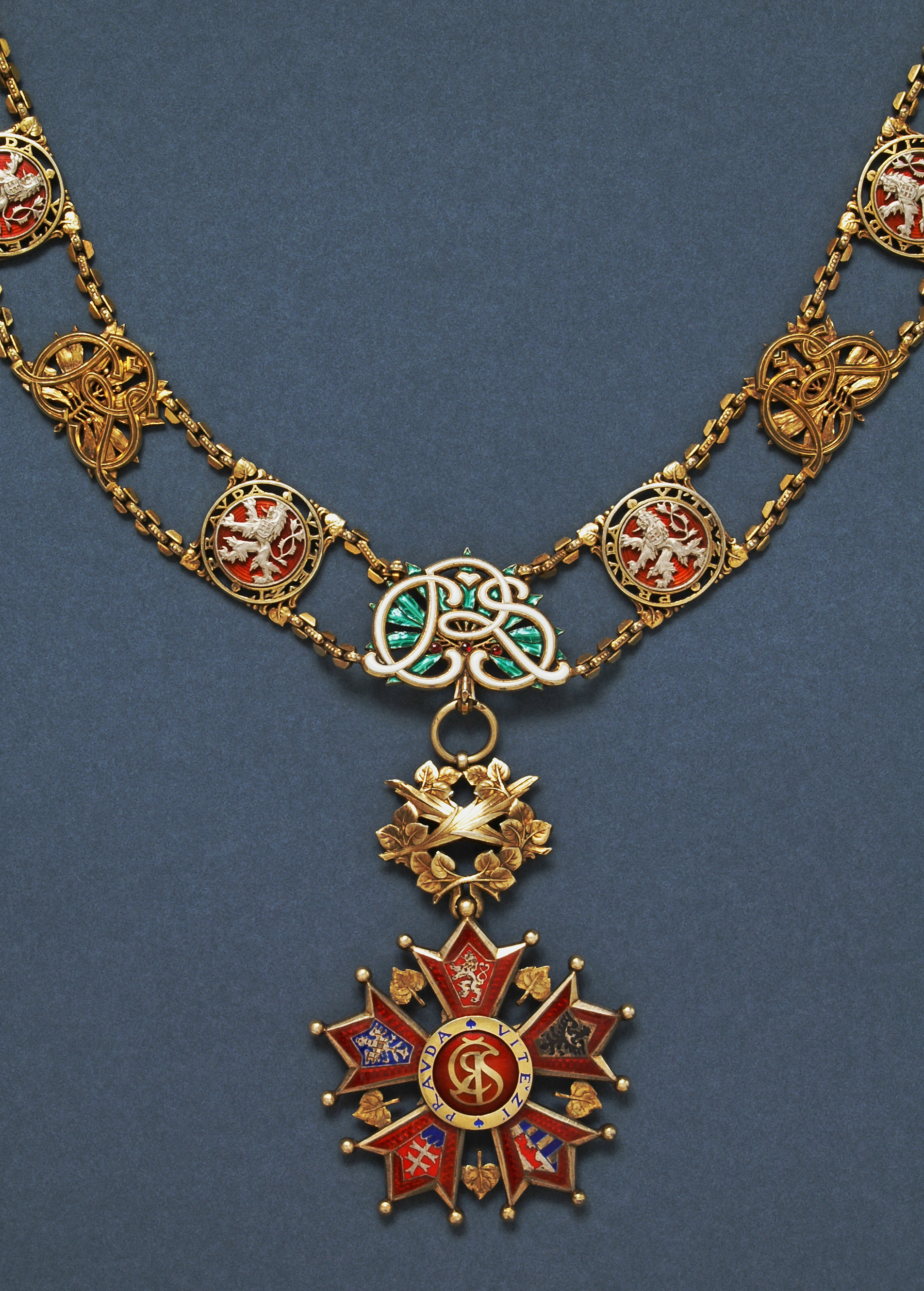
The collar of the Order of the White Lion awarded between 1921 and 1961

The order was created as an award for merit by Czechoslovakia for foreign citizens. The Order was established in five classes and two divisions, civil (with two crossed palms above the badge) and military (with two crossed swords above the badge). Medals were made of gold and silver. The numbers of recipients was originally limited, with the limits changing during later years. The Statutes of the order were amended in 1924, 1930, and 1936.

The badge of the Order was a five-sided red enameled star, the ends adorned with small balls, and with leaflets between the arms. In middle of the star is a silver lion, taken from the national coat of arms. The reverse of the Star is also red enameled, with the coat of arms of the former parts of Czechoslovakia (Bohemia, Moravia, Silesia, Slovakia and Carpathian Ruthenia).

I Class with collar – reserved for heads of state, introduced in 1924. Collar can be awarded separately.
I Class – Grand cross – limited to 250 recipients
II Class – Grand Officer – limited to 400 recipients
III Class – Commander – limited to 900 recipients
IV Class – Officer – limited to 1500 recipients, cross was smaller than the cross of the II/III class.
V Class – Knight – limited to 3000 recipients, cross was similar to IV Class, but in silver.
Gold medal
Silver medal

Subsequent to World War II, the Order of the White Lion became an award to those who had helped liberate Czechoslovakia from occupation by Nazi Germany. Following the surrender of Germany in May 1945, a large number of foreign bestowals were made by presenting the Order of the White Lion to senior officers of the Allied militaries. A similar Order with the same name, Military Order of the White Lion was instituted in 1945 and could be conferred upon both Czechoslovak citizens and foreigners. Dwight D. Eisenhower, George S. Patton and John L. Pierce are three Americans who received the Military Order of the White Lion after the close of World War II. Argentinian revolutionary Ernesto Guevara is also a notable recipient of the award.

== 1961–1992 ==
The Order was remodeled after the change of the official name of Czechoslovakia and its national arms. A new regulation was issued for the order, and was divided into three classes (I, II, and III, with I being the highest). The Collar was reserved only for foreign heads of state.

I Class – consisted of the badge and sash star
II Class – neck badge and star worn on the right breast
III Class – neck badge

The Order of the White Lion continued to exist in this form until the dissolution of Czechoslovakia.

== Since 1994 ==
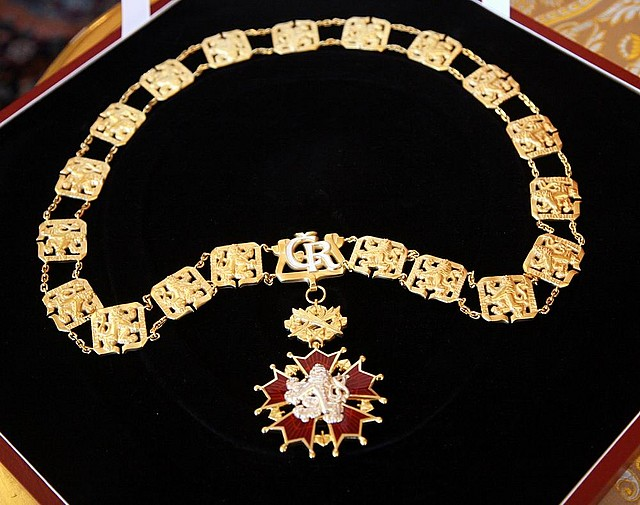
The collar of the Order of the White Lion awarded to Lech Kaczyński, the President of the Republic of Poland

In 1994, the order was re-established as the highest decoration of the Czech Republic; unlike in the past, it is now awarded by the President of the Czech Republic to Czech citizens and foreigners alike for outstanding services to the Czech Republic. It is issued in five classes, with the fifth and fourth classes presented as crosses, the third class awarded as an order that is worn around the neck, the second class as an order that is worn around the neck with chest star, and the first class as a grand cross (sash with badge and star).

The supreme grade of the Order of the White Lion, the first class accompanied by a gold neck chain may only be awarded to Heads of State. By law, the President is entitled to the first class insignia including the chain; after leaving the office, it may be conferred upon him for life by a joint resolution of the Chamber of Deputies and the Senate.

=== Award for saving Czechoslovak Jews ===
On 19 May 2014, it was announced that Nicholas Winton was to receive the order for giving Czech children "the greatest possible gift: the chance to live and to be free". On 28 October 2014, Winton was awarded the Order of the White Lion (Class I) by Czech President Miloš Zeman, the Czech Defence Ministry having sent a special aircraft to bring him to Prague. The award was made alongside one to Sir Winston Churchill, which was accepted by his grandson Nicholas Soames. Zeman said he regretted the highest Czech award having been awarded to the two personalities so belatedly, but added "better late than never". Winton was also able to meet some of the people he rescued 75 years earlier, themselves then in their 80s. He said, "I want to thank you all for this enormous expression of thanks for something which happened to me nearly 100 years ago—and 100 years is a heck of a long time. I am delighted that so many of the children are still about and are here to thank me."

== Ribbon bars ==
Order of the White Lion ribbon bars
	ČSR (1922–1961)	ČSSR (1961–1990)	ČSFR (1990–1992)	Czech Republic (since 1994)
I Class				
II Class				
III Class				
IV Class		not created		
V Class		not created		
Gold Medal		not created	not created	not created
Silver Medal		not created	not created	not created
