= Arthur O. Beyer =

United States Army Medal of Honor recipient (1909–1965)

Arthur Otto Beyer
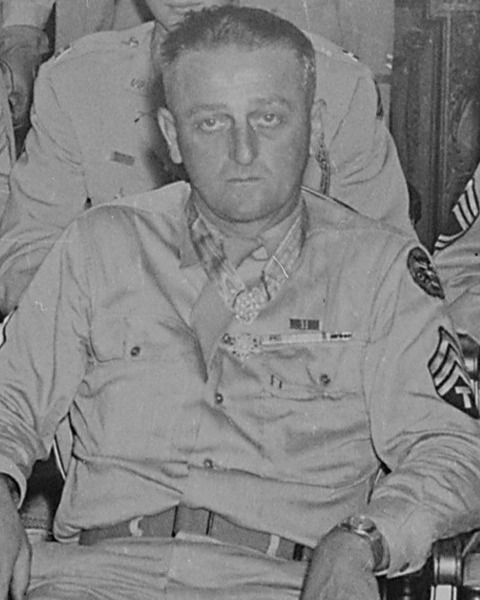
- Arthur Beyer after receiving his Medal of Honor from President Harry S. Truman on August 23, 1945
- Born: May 20, 1909; Rock Township, Mitchell County, Iowa, US
- Died: February 16, 1965 (aged 55); Buffalo, North Dakota, US
- Burial place: Saint Ansgar, Iowa, US
- Military career
- Allegiance: United States
- Branch: United States Army
- Service years: 1941–1945
- Rank: Sergeant
- Unit: 603rd Tank Destroyer Battalion
- Conflicts: World War II; Ardennes-Alsace; Central Europe
- Awards: Medal of Honor

Arthur Otto Beyer (May 20, 1909 – February 16, 1965) was a United States Army soldier and a recipient of the United States military's highest decoration—the Medal of Honor—for his actions in the Battle of the Bulge during World War II.

== Biography ==
Arthur Beyer was born to Richard and Anna Beyer (both immigrants from Luxembourg) in St. Ansgar, Iowa. Sources differ regarding his birth year: 1909 or 1910. His father died prematurely, and Beyer went to work to help support his mother and three siblings after he completed eighth grade. He was an auto-mechanic at the time he joined the Army in February 1941.

Beyer joined the military from St. Ansgar, and by January 15, 1945, was serving as a corporal in Company C, 603rd Tank Destroyer Battalion. On that day, near Arloncourt in Belgium, he used hand grenades and his carbine to single-handedly destroy two German machine gun positions before working his way through a honey-combed series of enemy foxholes—killing and capturing German soldiers as he went. For these actions, he was awarded the Medal of Honor by President Harry Truman seven months later, on August 30, 1945.

Beyer also witnessed the horrors at Buchenwald when American troops liberated the prisoners held in the German concentration camp.

Beyer rose to the rank of Sergeant before leaving the Army. He moved to rural Buffalo, North Dakota, and worked as a farm hand after returning from the war. He married Marian Hicks in 1962, and they traveled to the White House with other Medal of Honor recipients for a special reception hosted by President John F. Kennedy in May 1963.

Beyer killed himself at his farm in Buffalo, North Dakota, at age 55 on February 17, 1965.

== Medal of Honor citation ==
Beyer's official Medal of Honor citation reads:

He displayed conspicuous gallantry in action. His platoon, in which he was a tank-destroyer gunner, was held up by antitank, machinegun, and rifle fire from enemy troops dug in along a ridge about 200 yards to the front. Noting a machinegun position in this defense line, he fired upon it with his 76-mm. gun killing 1 man and silencing the weapon. He dismounted from his vehicle and, under direct enemy observation, crossed open ground to capture the 2 remaining members of the crew. Another machinegun, about 250 yards to the left, continued to fire on him. Through withering fire, he advanced on the position. Throwing a grenade into the emplacement, he killed 1 crewmember and again captured the 2 survivors. He was subjected to concentrated small-arms fire but, with great bravery, he worked his way a quarter mile along the ridge, attacking hostile soldiers in their foxholes with his carbine and grenades. When he had completed his self-imposed mission against powerful German forces, he had destroyed 2 machinegun positions, killed 8 of the enemy and captured 18 prisoners, including 2 bazooka teams. Cpl. Beyer's intrepid action and unflinching determination to close with and destroy the enemy eliminated the German defense line and enabled his task force to gain its objective.

== See also ==
- List of Medal of Honor recipients for World War II
