= John L. Pierce =

American general

John Leonard Pierce
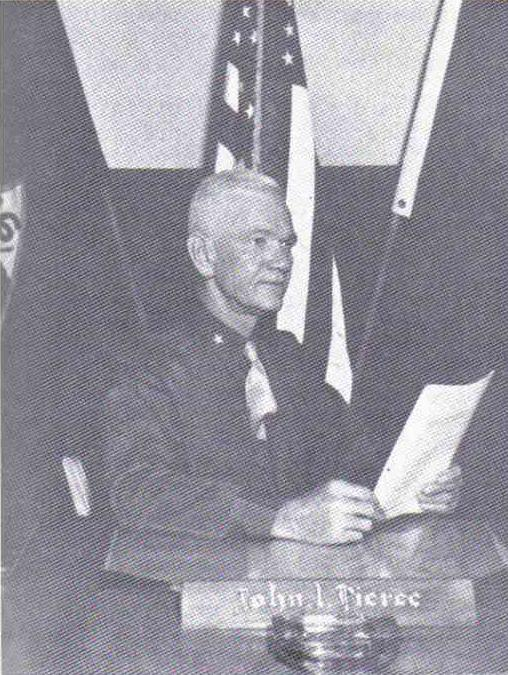
- Born: April 25, 1895; Dallas, Texas, US
- Died: February 12, 1959 (aged 63); San Antonio, Texas, US
- Military career
- Allegiance: United States
- Branch: United States Army
- Service years: 1917-1946
- Rank: Brigadier General
- Commands: 16th Armored Division
- Conflicts: World War I World War II
- Awards: Legion of Merit (2)

John Leonard Pierce (April 25, 1895 – February 12, 1959) was a United States Army officer with the rank of brigadier general. He is most noted as a commander of the 16th Armored Division during World War II.

== Early years ==
John Leonard Pierce was born on April 25, 1895, in Dallas, Texas, as the son of lawyer, Frank Cushman Pierce and his wife, Isabella. Pierce attended the West Texas Military Academy in San Antonio, Texas, and subsequently Texas A&M University and then joined the Army in June 1917. Subsequently served during World War I in France. After war, Pierce served with 8th Infantry Division within Occupation forces in Koblenz, Germany.

After return to the United States, Pierce stayed in the Army and was interested in mobile warfare and the development of armor.

== World War II ==
At the beginning of World War II, Pierce served as a Deputy Chief of Staff of the 3rd Armored Division under command of Major general Alvan C. Gillem. One year later, Pierce was transferred to the II Armored Corps (later redesignated as the XVIII Airborne Corps), where he served as Chief of Staff.

In June 1943, Pierce was promoted to the rank of brigadier general and was appointed a Chief of Staff of Armored Command. He stayed in this capacity until September 1944, when he was transferred to Camp Chaffee in Arkansas, where he assumed command of 16th Armored Division. He replaced major general Douglass T. Greene in this capacity.

Pierce arrived with his 16th Armored Division in Europe in February 1945 and participated in combats in Germany and Czechoslovakia. Pierce commanded the division during the liberation of Pilsen.

For his service during World War II, general Pierce was awarded with Legion of Merit with Oak Leaf Cluster by the government of the United States and with Order of the White Lion and with War Cross by the government of the Czechoslovakia for his merits during liberation of Western Bohemia.

== Life after War ==
Pierce was subsequently transferred back to the United States, where he was appointed the President of the Secretary of War's Discharge Review Board. He served in this capacity until 1946, when he retired from the Army.

Brigadier general John Leonard Pierce died at the age of 63 at his home in San Antonio, Texas.

== Decorations ==
Here is Brigadier general Pierce´s ribbon bar:

1st Row	Legion of Merit with Oak Leaf Cluster			
2nd Row	World War I Victory Medal with two Battle Clasps	Army of Occupation of Germany Medal	American Defense Service Medal	American Campaign Medal
3rd Row	European-African-Middle Eastern Campaign Medal with three service stars	World War II Victory Medal	Czechoslovak Order of the White Lion	Czechoslovak War Cross 1939-1945

== Gallery ==
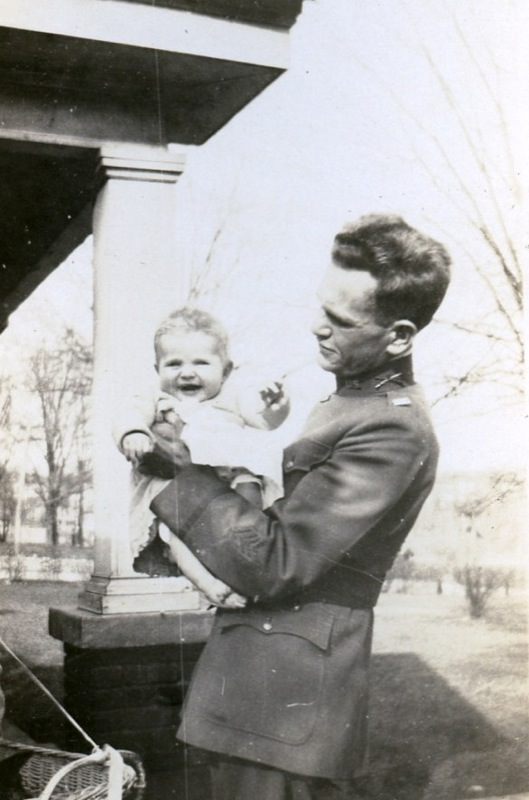
John L. Pierce as a Captain, with his newborn daughter, Isabel.

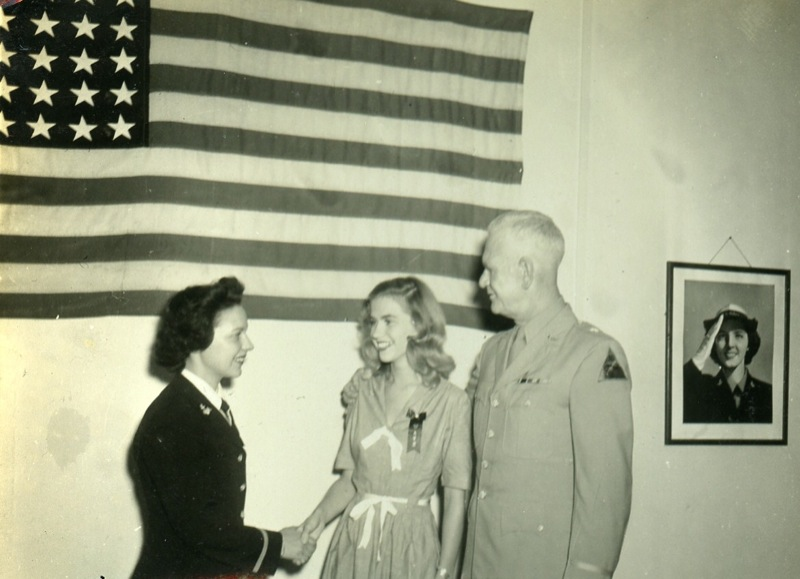
Brigadier General John L. Pierce and his daughter, Isabel, during her swearing-in ceremony for WAVES (Women Accepted for Volunteer Emergency Service).

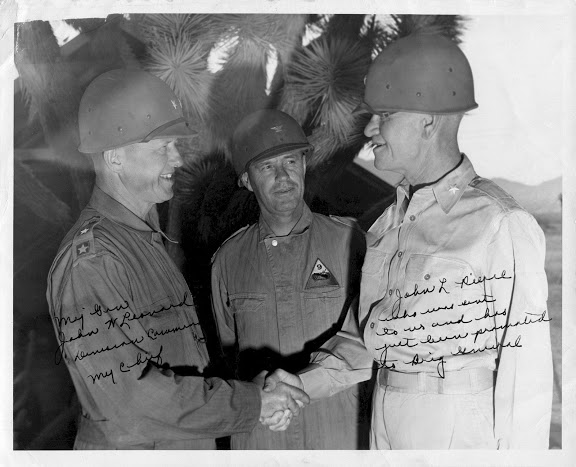
Major General John W. Leonard (9th Armored Div.), Colonel Albert Kelly and Brigadier General John L. Pierce (16th Armored Div.) on the wartime photo.

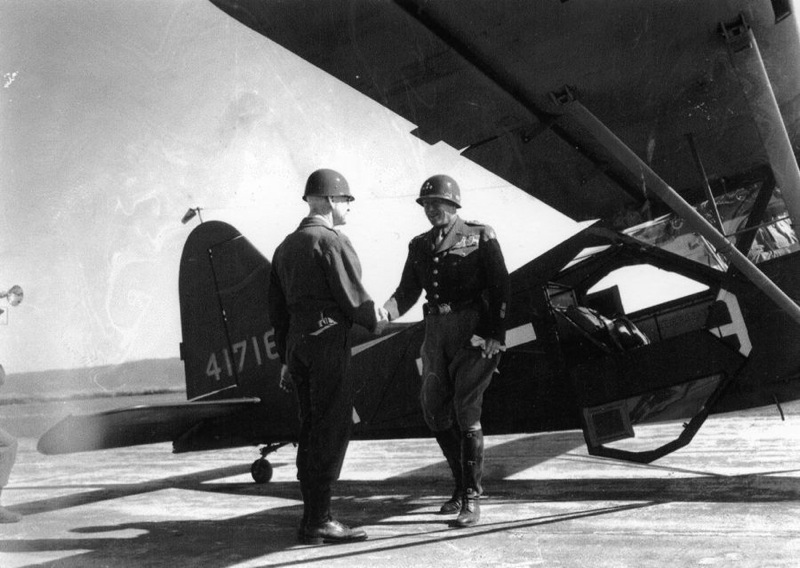
Brigadier General John L. Pierce, welcoming General George S. Patton at the Pilsen airport, May 1945.

== See also ==
Military offices
Preceded by Douglass T. Greene	Commanding General 16th Armored Division; 1944–1945	Succeeded by Post deactivated
