= 16th Armored Division (United States) =

- Shoulder sleeve patch of the United States Army 16th Armored Division
- Active: 15 July 1943 – 15 October 1945
- Country: United States
- Branch: United States Army
- Type: Armored division
- Nickname: Armadillo
- Engagements: World War II: Central Europe

Commanders
- Notable commanders: John L. Pierce

Insignia
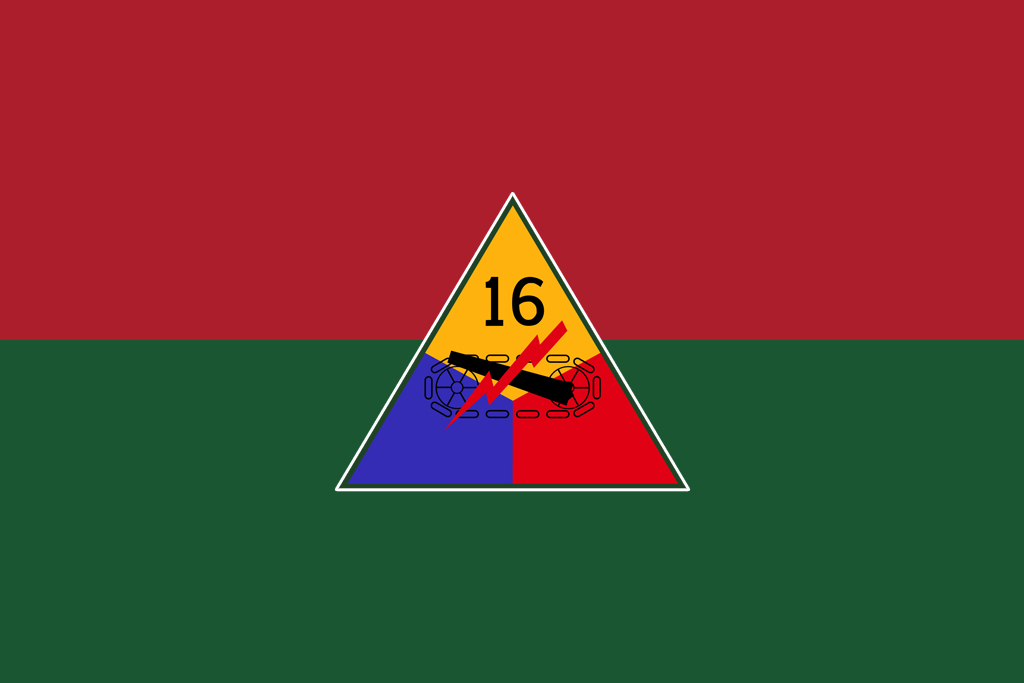
- Flag of the United States Army 16th Armored Division

The 16th Armored Division (Armadillo) was a light armored division of the United States Army in World War II. In its one and only combat operation, the 16th Armored Division liberated the city of Plzeň in western Czechoslovakia (today the Czech Republic), an operation that influenced the landscape of post-war Europe.

== History ==
The division was activated in the Army of the United States on 15 July 1943 at Camp Chaffee in Arkansas. They performed all of their training at Camp Chaffee until they received their staging orders. They staged at Camp Shanks (the largest port of embarkation) at Orangeburg, New York on 28 January 1945, until got their port call. They sailed from the New York Port of Embarkation on 5 February 1945.

The 16th Armored Division arrived at LeHarve, France in stages between 11 and 17 February 1945, and processed into the European Theater of Operations. They had been assigned to the Fifteenth United States Army on 29 January 1945, but were waiting for an assignment to a unit actually involved in fighting.

The division was assigned to Third United States Army on 17 April 1945, and entered Germany on 19 April 1945. It crossed the Rhine at Mainz, and relieved the 71st Infantry Division at Nuremberg on 28 April 1945. The 23rd Cavalry Reconnaissance Squadron participated in combat from the Isar River to Wasserburg am Inn with the 86th Infantry Division. While under the control of that organization, it crossed the Isar at Granek on 30 April 1945, advanced to Indorf, seized several small villages, and was driving toward Wasserburg against slight resistance when ordered to return to Nuremberg. The division was given a security and training mission at Nuremberg, Germany, until 5 May. When the 23rd Cavalry Squadron arrived at Nuremberg on 4 May, it reverted to the control of the 16th Armored. The division assembled and proceeded to Waidhaus, Germany on 5 May.

=== Combat chronicle ===
During the final days of battle in Europe, the final stronghold of German armed forces was a pocket in Czechoslovakia. As Soviet Red Army and American forces moved to the area, there was debate between US and British leaders regarding attempts to deny the Soviets a post-war foothold in Czechoslovakia. It was decided that the American forces would help the Soviets subdue the estimated 141,000 German troops before exiting the area. The task was aided by the desire of German forces to avoid imprisonment by the Soviets, with numerous German divisions arranging surrender to US forces, if the Americans arrived first. This did not stop fanatical German SS Troops from continuing to fight both Czechoslovak and, as they arrived, American forces.

The 16th Armored Division was assigned to V Corps on 6 May, and attacked through the lines of the 97th Infantry Division, with Combat Command B (CCB) led by Col. Charles Noble making the main effort. They advanced along the Bor–Plzeň Road that same day, launching an attack on Plzeň, Czechoslovakia, designed to capture the Škoda Munitions Plant. Combat Command Reserve (CCR) advanced through Plzeň to assigned high ground east of the city. The division spent 7 and 8 May in mopping up activities and patrolling. General Patton ordered elements of the 16th AD to move towards Prague, where the German commander was waiting to surrender to US forces, but the troops were recalled to Plzeň per the agreement with the Soviet Union. Aside from the few hours on the road to Prague, the capture of Plzeň marked the deepest point of American penetration into Czechoslovakia.

The Division suffered the lightest casualty count of all US Armored Divisions in Europe, with only 12 wounded, and spent 3 days in combat.

Three months later, the 16th AD was still located in Czechoslovakia, in Stříbro (west of Plzeň), on VJ Day.

The division returned to the New York Port of Embarkation on 13 October 1945 and was inactivated at Camp Kilmer in New Jersey on 15 October 1945.

=== Casualties ===
- Total battle casualties: 32
- Killed in action: 4
- Wounded in action: 28

=== Division organization ===
==== Heavy armored division ====
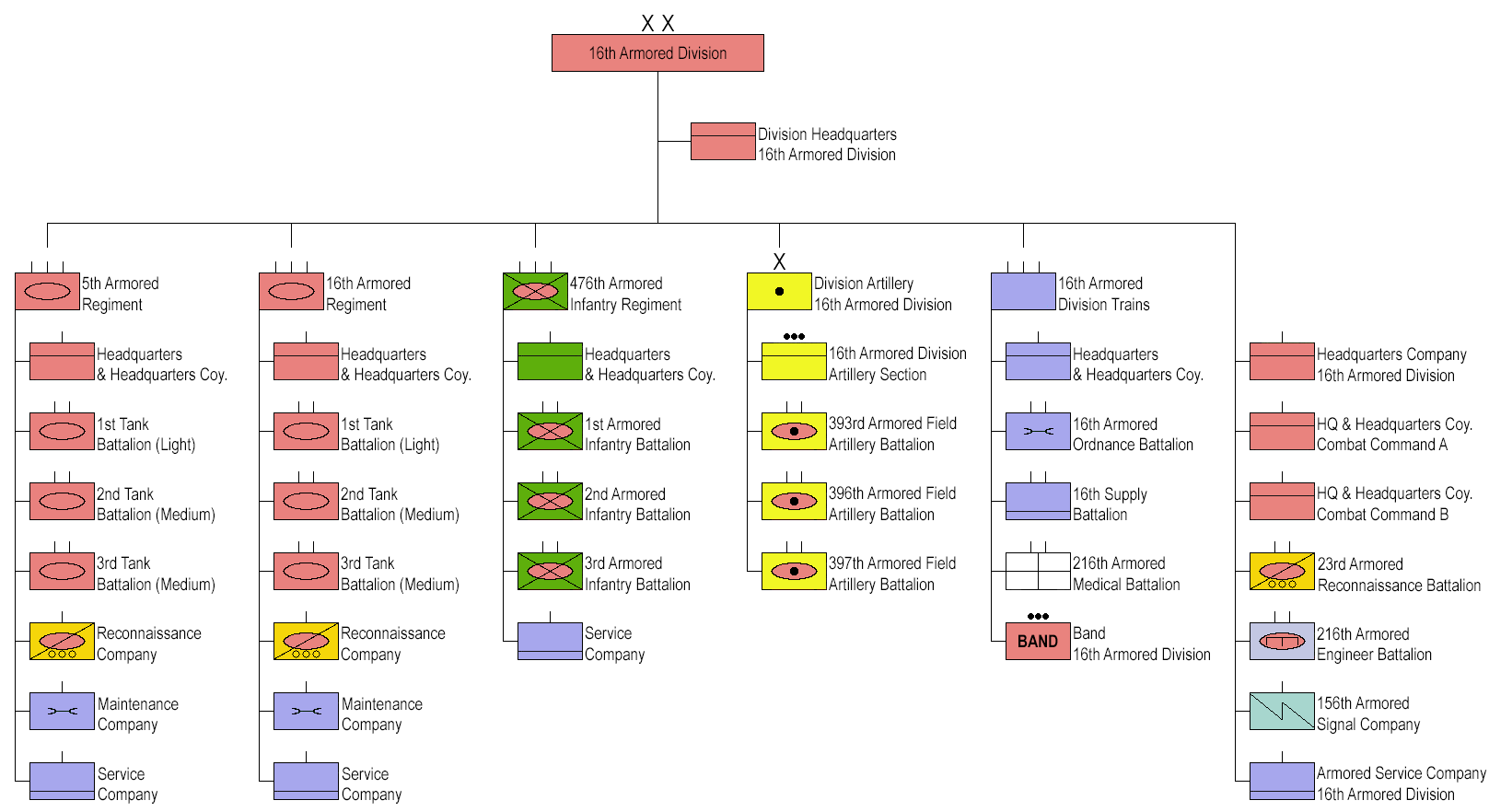
16th Armored Division organization after the division's activation (click to enlarge)

The division was activated as a heavy armored division in 1943. At the time the 16th Armored Division was composed of the following units:

- 16th Armored Division
  - Division Headquarters
  - Headquarters Company, 16th Armored Division
  - Headquarters and Headquarters Company, Combat Command A
  - Headquarters and Headquarters Company, Combat Command B
  - 156th Armored Signal Company
  - Armored Service Company (includes the division's Military Police Platoon)
  - 5th Armored Regiment
    - Headquarters and Headquarters Company
    - Reconnaissance Company (M3 scout cars and T30 HMC self propelled guns)
    - Maintenance Company
    - Service Company
    - 1st Tank Battalion (Light)
      - Headquarters and Headquarters Company
      - 3× Light Tank companies (A, B, C) (M3/M5 Stuart light tanks)
    - 2nd Tank Battalion (Medium)
      - Headquarters and Headquarters Company
      - 3× Medium Tank companies (D, E, F) (M4 Sherman tanks)
    - 3rd Tank Battalion (Medium)
      - Headquarters and Headquarters Company
      - 3× Medium Tank companies (G, H, I) (M4 Sherman tanks)
  - 16th Armored Regiment
    - same organization as 5th Armored Regiment
  - 476th Armored Infantry Regiment
    - Headquarters and Headquarters Company
    - 3× Armored infantry battalions
      - each battalion consists of: 1× Headquarters and Headquarters Company, 3× Rifle companies on M3 half-tracks
    - Service Company
  - 23rd Armored Reconnaissance Battalion
    - Headquarters and Headquarters Company
    - 3× Reconnaissance companies (M3 scout cars)
    - Light Tank Company (M3/M5 Stuart light tanks)
  - 216th Armored Engineer Battalion
    - Headquarters and Headquarters Company
    - 4× Armored engineer companies
    - Bridge Company
  - 16th Armored Division Artillery
    - 16th Armored Division Artillery Section
    - 393rd Armored Field Artillery Battalion
      - Headquarters and Headquarters Battery
      - 3× Field artillery batteries (M7 Priest self propelled howitzers)
      - Service Battery
    - 396th Armored Field Artillery Battalion
      - same organization as 393rd Armored Field Artillery Battalion
    - 397th Armored Field Artillery Battalion
      - same organization as 393rd Armored Field Artillery Battalion
  - 16th Armored Division Trains
    - Headquarters and Headquarters Company
    - 16th Armored Ordnance Battalion
      - Headquarters and Headquarters Company
      - 3× Maintenance companies
    - 16th Supply Battalion
      - Headquarters and Headquarters Company
      - 2× Truck companies
    - 216th Armored Medical Battalion
      - Headquarters and Headquarters Company
      - 3× Medical companies
    - 16th Armored Division Band

==== Light armored division ====
Early in 1943, the Army Ground Force began a series of studies to reorganize the various divisions within the Army. After reviewing the tables of organization and after allowing the various commands to review and comment on the proposed restructure, the War Department published on 15 September 1943 a new armored division tables of organization. The restructuring removed the two armored regiments and armored infantry regiment from the table of organization and replaced them with three tank battalions and three armored infantry battalions. Each tank battalion included one light and three medium tank companies. Both Combat Commands, A and B, remained, but an additional Reserve Command was added to the organization. This was a small headquarters element of 10 personnel tasked to clarify command and control in the division's rear area. Armored engineer battalions lost their bridge companies, while their engineer companies were reduced from four to three. The division's cavalry reconnaissance squadron was increased in size to include an HQ Troop, four reconnaissance troops, a light tank company, and an assault gun troop of four platoons (one for each reconnaissance troop). Within the division trains, the division lost its supply battalion and the division's armored service company. These changes pared the division's strength from 14,630 men to 10,937, slashed the number of tanks from 360 to 263, reduced the variety of vehicles to ease repair problems, and eliminated the maintenance-prone motorcycles.

After its reorganization as a light armored division the 16th Armored Division was composed of the following units:

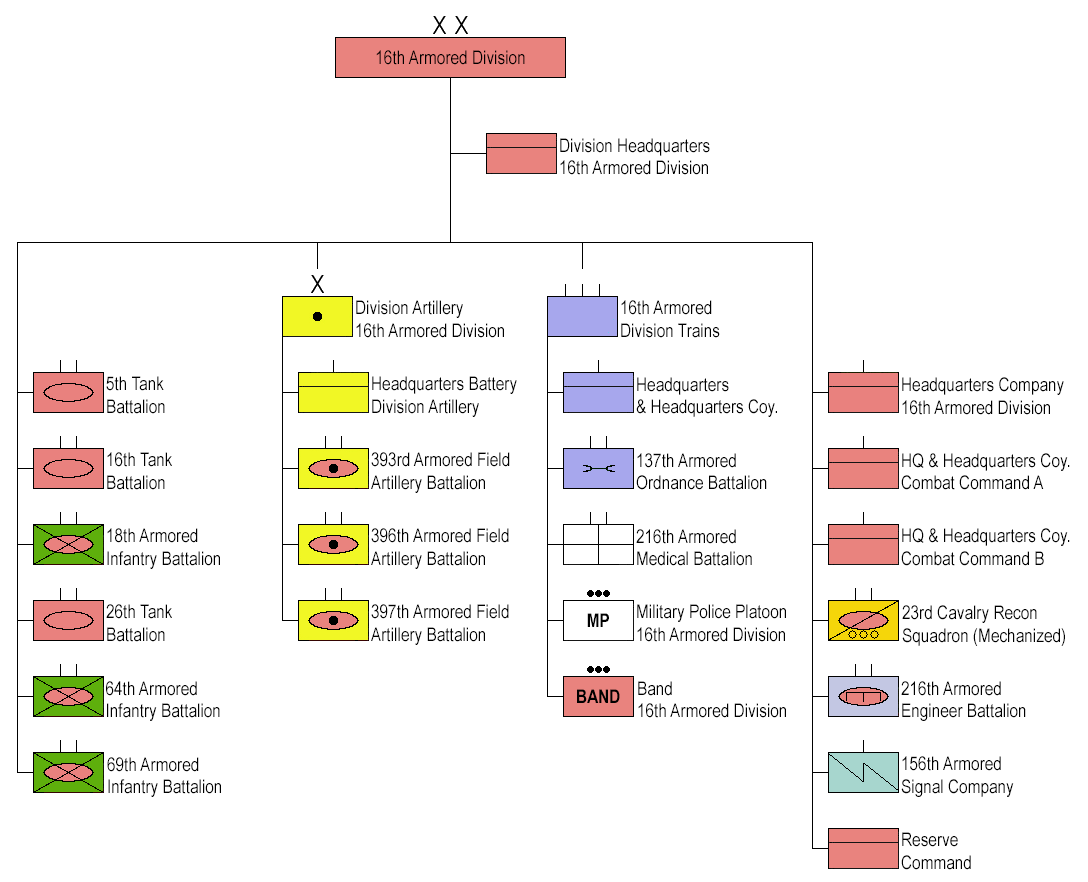
16th Armored Division organization after the division's reorganization (click to enlarge)

- 16th Armored Division
  - Division Headquarters
  - Headquarters Company, 16th Armored Division
  - Headquarters and Headquarters Company, Combat Command A
  - Headquarters and Headquarters Company, Combat Command B
  - 156th Armored Signal Company
  - Reserve Command
  - 5th Tank Battalion
    - Headquarters and Headquarters Company
    - 3× Medium Tank companies (M4 Sherman tanks)
    - Light Tank Company (M3/M5 Stuart or M24 Chaffee light tanks)
    - Service Company
  - 16th Tank Battalion
    - same organization as 5th Tank Battalion
  - 26th Tank Battalion
    - same organization as 5th Tank Battalion
  - 18th Armored Infantry Battalion
    - Headquarters and Headquarters Company
    - 3× Rifle companies (M3 half-tracks)
    - Service Company
  - 64th Armored Infantry Battalion
    - same organization as 18th Armored Infantry Battalion
  - 69th Armored Infantry Battalion
    - same organization as 18th Armored Infantry Battalion
  - 23rd Cavalry Reconnaissance Squadron (Mechanized)
    - Headquarters and Headquarters and Service Troop
    - 4× Cavalry reconnaissance troops (M8 Greyhound armored cars)
    - Cavalry Assault Gun Troop (M8 Scott self propelled guns)
    - Light Tank Company (M3/M5 Stuart or M24 Chaffee light tanks)
  - 216th Armored Engineer Battalion
    - Headquarters and Headquarters Company
    - 3× Armored engineer companies
  - 16th Armored Division Artillery
    - Headquarters and Headquarters Battery
    - 393rd Armored Field Artillery Battalion
      - Headquarters and Headquarters Battery
      - 3× Field artillery batteries (M7 Priest self propelled howitzers)
      - Service Battery
    - 396th Armored Field Artillery Battalion
      - same organization as 393rd Armored Field Artillery Battalion
    - 397th Armored Field Artillery Battalion
      - same organization as 393rd Armored Field Artillery Battalion
  - 16th Armored Division Trains
    - Headquarters and Headquarters Company
    - 137th Armored Ordnance Battalion
      - Headquarters and Headquarters Company
      - 3× Maintenance companies
    - 216th Armored Medical Battalion
      - Headquarters and Headquarters Company
      - 3× Medical companies
    - Military Police Platoon
    - 16th Armored Division Band

Attached units:

- 633rd Tank Destroyer Battalion (Self-propelled) 1 May 1945 – 14 June 1945
- 571st Antiaircraft Artillery Battalion 20 April 1945 – 19 May 1945
- 1st Platoon, 994th Engineer Treadway Bridge Company 6 May 1945 – 10 May 1945
- B Battery, 987th Field Artillery Battalion (155mm Gun) 6 May 1945 – 15 May 1945

=== Assignments in the European Theater of Operations ===
- 29 January 1945: Fifteenth Army, Twelfth Army Group
- 17 April 1945: Third Army, Twelfth Army Group
- 6 May 1945: V Corps, Third Army

== Honors ==
=== Campaigns ===
- Central Europe

=== Individual awards ===
- Distinguished Service Cross 2
- Silver Star 4
- Soldiers Medal 1
- Bronze Star 135
- Air Medal 1

== Commanders ==
- MG Douglass T. Greene – 15 July 1943 – September 1944
- BG John L. Pierce – September 1944 – 15 October 1945

Division artillery commander

- COL. Barksdale Hamlett

== 16th Armored Division Association ==
- 16th Armored Division Association

2517 Connecticut Avenue
Washington, D. C.

== Media ==
=== Online ===
- 16th Armored Division Association Facebook Page

=== Newspaper ===
- The 16th Armadillo, first published in Plzeň, Czechoslovakia in June 1945

=== Books ===
- The Liberators of Pilsen: The U.S. 16th Armored Division in World War II Czechoslovakia by Bryan J. Dickerson published January 5, 2018

== See also ==
- Prague Offensive
- United States Third Army
- Twelfth United States Army Group
- 16th Armored Division Re-enactment Group

== Bibliography ==
- Stanton, Shelby L. (1984) ORDER OF BATTLE: US Army in World War II; Presidio Press:Novato, CA. ISBN 978-0891411956
- McGaw, E. J., The Army Almanac: A Book of Facts Concerning the Army of the United States, U.S. Government Printing Office, 1950, pp. 510–592
- U.S. Army Center of Military History - 16th Armored Division - World War II Divisional Combat Chronicles access date = 3 October 2015
