= 633rd Tank Destroyer Battalion =

United States Army WWII military unit

- Active: 1941–1945
- Disbanded: 1945
- Country: United States
- Allegiance: Army
- Part of: Independent unit
- Equipment: M18 Hellcat

The 633rd Tank Destroyer Battalion was a self-propelled tank destroyer battalion of the United States Army active during the Second World War.

The battalion was activated on 15 December 1941 as part of the general reorganisation of the anti-tank force. It deployed into France in April 1945, equipped with M18 Hellcat tank destroyers, attached to 16th Armored Division. The battalion moved into Germany, seeing action around Nuremberg in the first week of May, and finishing the war at Plzeň, inside Czechoslovakia.

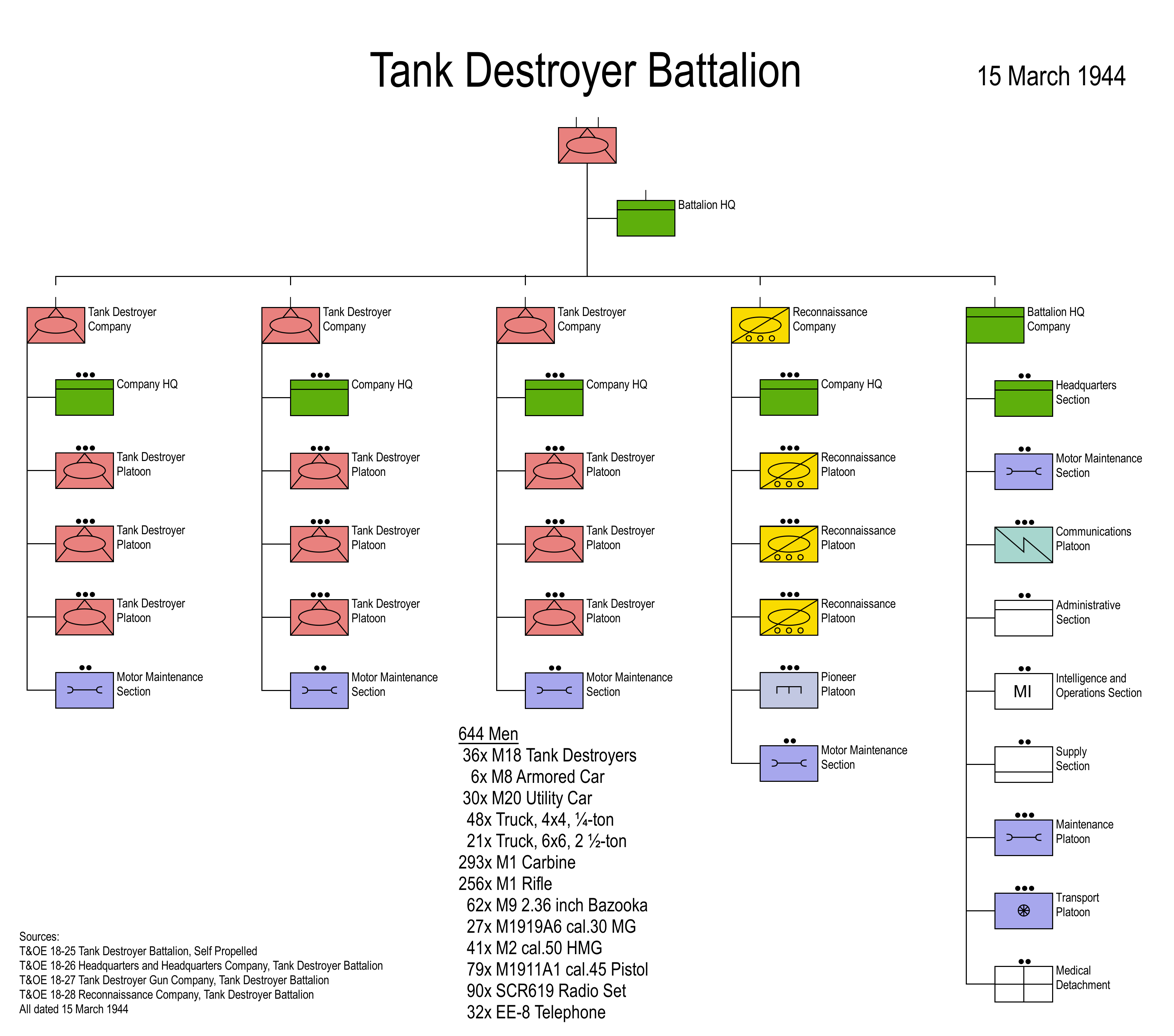
Tank Destroyer Battalion (SP) Structure – March 1944
