= 628th Tank Destroyer Battalion =

- Active: 1941–1945
- Disbanded: 1945; reorganized as 628th Tank Battalion
- Country: United States
- Allegiance: Army
- Part of: Independent unit
- Nickname(s): "Victory"
- Equipment: M10 tank destroyer M36 tank destroyer

The 628th Tank Destroyer Battalion was a tank destroyer battalion of the United States Army active during the Second World War. It was redesignated the 628th Tank Battalion after the end of the war, and today exists as the 103rd Armor Regiment.

== Early service ==
What would become the battalion was formed on 10 July 1941 as the 28th Infantry Division Provisional Antitank Battalion, and on 15 December was redesignated as the 628th Tank Destroyer Battalion (constituted 3 December 1941 in the Army of the United States), in line with the reorganization of the anti-tank force. On 7 March 1942, the battalion was redesignated as a National Guard unit and allotted to the Pennsylvania National Guard. During training, in 1943, the battalion provided a cadre to form the nucleus of the 648th Tank Destroyer Battalion. The 628th remained in the United States until January 1944, when it was shipped to the United Kingdom aboard the Aquitania. From 11 April to 5 July, it operated three marshaling camps in southern England, providing accommodation and administration for combat troops of the 1st and the 29th Divisions being prepared for the Normandy landings.

== France ==
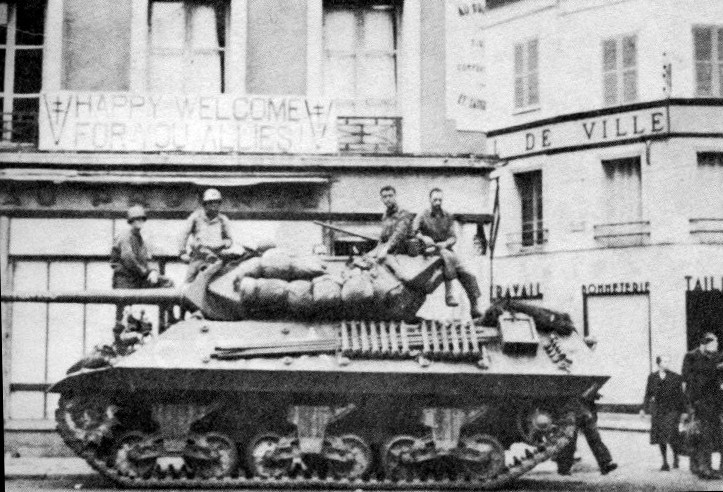
M10 and crew in Dreux, c. 16 August

The battalion landed in Normandy on 30 July, equipped with M10 tank destroyers. After a brief period in camp, it was attached to the newly arrived 5th Armored Division, and began operations on 2 August, with first contact with an enemy force on 4 August. In order to co-operate more closely with the 5th Armored, the battalion was split up, with one company going to each of the division's Combat Commands.

The force moved south through Avranches and then southwest to Le Mans, before pushing north on 10 August to help close the Falaise Pocket. On 11 August a Panzer IV was destroyed, the first of the battalion's tank kills, and the same night, the rearguard of Company A encountered a German column, and in a close-range action accounted for eight vehicles and 240 enemy troops; a sergeant of the company received both the Silver Star and the Croix de Guerre for this action, giving the battalion its first tank kill and its first combat decoration on the same day.

The battalion headed eastwards on 15 August, briefly crossing the Eure River on the 17th. The commanding officer, Lt. Col. Hernandez, was killed on 20 August whilst observing indirect fire, and succeeded by his executive officer, Major Gallagher; in the same action, two Panzer V tanks were destroyed for the loss of one M10, the first tank destroyer lost in action by the battalion. After operating along the Seine for several days, the battalion withdrew southeast to rest on the 25th.

On 27 August, 5th Armored was detached from the XV Corps and ordered to drive east to the Belgian border; the battalion left camp on the 30th and, passing through Paris, arrived on the border late on the night of 2 September. The battalion was reorganized and attached in its entirety to Combat Command R, before the division moved south to Sedan and eastwards to Luxembourg, crossing the border on 9 September and arriving at the German border on the 11th.

== Siegfried Line ==
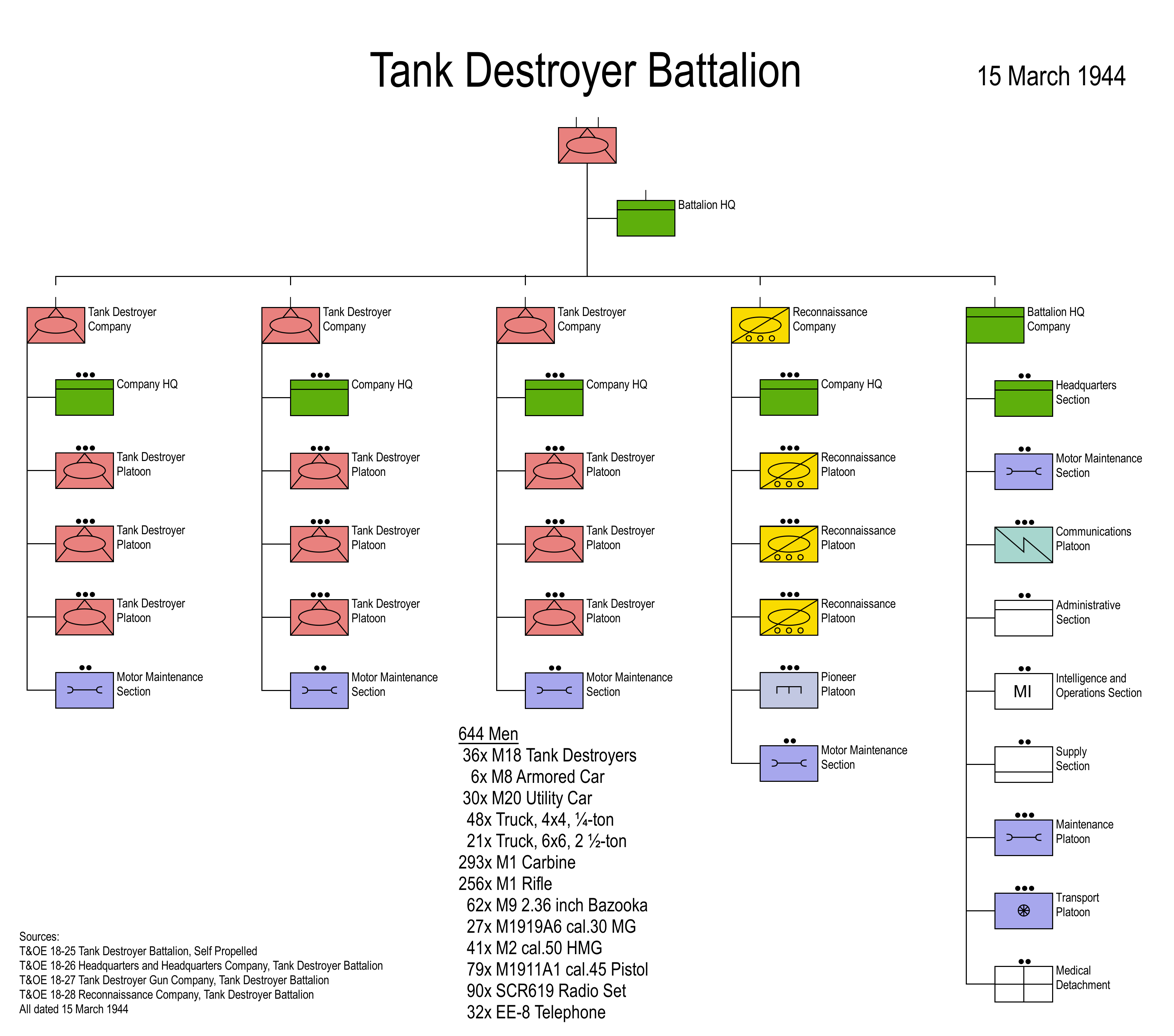
Tank Destroyer Battalion (SP) Structure – March 1944

On the 13th, the division began to push against the Siegfried Line fortifications around Wallendorf, aiming to push through to Bitburg. The first elements of the battalion crossed onto German soil on the 13th, with the remainder of the battalion crossing on the 15th and establishing a command post six miles inside Germany. The battalion came under a strong counter-attack on the 17th, with Lt. Rennbaum of B Company receiving the Distinguished Service Cross for his work in evacuating his platoon under heavy fire.

The 19th saw further intensification of the fighting, with artillery fire rising to the point where it was decided to withdraw all units back across the river into Luxembourg; the last element of the battalion left Germany at 5 am on the 20th. In this final day of combat, eleven German tanks were definitely destroyed by the battalion, with a further seven probably destroyed but not confirmed.

Through October and November 1944, the battalion remained in defensive positions, moving northwards to Faymonville in eastern Belgium in early October. Throughout this time, it mostly carried out indirect fire missions; Company C, attached to Combat Command B, was deployed for the attack on Aachen, but not committed to combat. The battalion moved eastwards into Germany, billeted near Kalterherberg, in late October; shortly thereafter, on 1 November, the battalion was re-equipped with new M36 tank destroyers.

In late November, Combat Command R, along with Company C, was detached from the 5th Armored to provide support to the 8th Infantry Division in the Battle of Hurtgen Forest; on 3 December, Combat Command A, with Company A, was likewise attached to the 4th Infantry, with both very heavy fighting – at one point, Company C was reduced to only one M-36 out of twelve able to operate. The battalion was strafed by Bf 109s on the 3rd; two were downed by anti-aircraft fire, the first aircraft the battalion had destroyed. On the 8th, plans were made to pull the battalion out of the line to prepare for a crossing of the Roer River, with companies B and C remaining in action for the time being.

== Battle of the Bulge ==
On 17 December, the scale of the German offensive in the Ardennes was becoming clear; the battalion was immediately ordered to provide anti-paratroop patrols along the divisional supply lines, and on the 19th was detached from the 5th Armored and attached to the 78th Infantry Division in XIX Corps, north of the main offensive area.

On 23 December, when it became apparent that the line north of the "bulge" was stable, the battalion was detached from the 78th Division and attached to 3rd Armored Division in VII Corps, deployed on the northern side of the German salient; it arrived in place in the early afternoon of the 24th, and took up defensive positions. After a brief encounter with German infantry on the 24th, combat began in the early hours of Christmas Day; a tank destroyer of Company B knocked out two Panther tanks at 25 yards range, causing the opposing force to withdraw and avoid the area. The battalion remained on the defensive until the 3rd Armored was withdrawn into reserve, and on 1 January was attached to the 82nd Airborne Division for eleven days to help clear the area west of the Salm River; during this period, the battalion lost four M36s and fourteen men, destroying six tanks – including two Tiger II tanks.

== Advance into Germany ==
On 11 January the battalion was attached to the 75th Infantry Division, but left them on the 16th, without having made contact with the enemy, and moved into XVIII Airborne Corps Reserve.

On 27 January the battalion was once again attached to its old partner, the 5th Armored Division, and joined them to rest and prepare for a crossing of the Roer River; Company A was detached to join the divisional artillery, and during the four weeks of preparations fired two thousand rounds of indirect fire. On 23 February the attack began, with Company B crossing the Roer at Linnich on the 25th, and the remainder of the battalion following the next day. The division then swung northwards through the Rhineland, reaching the west bank of the Rhine on 10 March. From the 13th to the 29th, the battalion fired 1500 rounds of harassing fire at targets in the Ruhr, on the far bank.

On 30 March the companies were assigned to combat commands in preparation for offensive operations, and crossed the river on the 31st, over a pontoon bridge at Wesel; the final breakout had begun. On 2 April, the division bypassed Münster, arriving at the Wesser River shortly thereafter and pausing until 8 April, when the river was crossed at Hamelin. The division moved north-east, passing to the south of Hannover and reaching the River Elbe on the 11th.

Whilst the division was consolidating its position on the west bank, intelligence reports suggested that the Clausewitz Panzer Division had broken out from the Berlin area, and was heading south in order to cut American supply lines and join up with other units in the Harz Mountains. In order to counter this threat, the division moved west, leaving Combat Command A (with Company A) to cover the Elbe. A divisional supply train was ambushed on the 16th, losing several vehicles; among them was a truck from the battalion, carrying the unit standard. This, however, was recaptured the next day. On the 23rd, a Panzer V tank was knocked out, the fifty-sixth and final tank destroyed by the battalion.

After two weeks of mopping-up operations, the region was deemed clear, and the companies reverted to battalion command on 25 April; the following day, the battalion moved to take up occupation duties in the Peine region of Lower Saxony, where it was located at the end of the war.

By the end of the war, the Battalion had accounted for 60 tanks and self-propelled guns, as well as 30 pieces of artillery and over a hundred other vehicles, with over 1200 enemy killed and 1500 prisoners taken.

== Later service ==
The battalion was inactivated on 14 November 1945. In May 1946 it was reactivated and redesignated as the 628th Tank Battalion, under which title it saw service in Europe for three years during the 1950s. In 1959 it joined with elements of the 110th Infantry Regiment and the 108th and 166th Field Artillery Battalions to form the 103rd Armor Regiment, a parent regiment in the Combat Arms Regimental System.
