= 648th Tank Destroyer Battalion =

- Active: 1943–1945
- Disbanded: 1945
- Country: United States
- Branch: Army
- Part of: Independent unit
- Equipment: 3" anti-tank guns M18 Hellcat
- Campaigns: World War II: Rhineland; Central Europe

The 648th Tank Destroyer Battalion was a tank destroyer battalion of the United States Army active during the Second World War.

The battalion was activated at Camp Bowie on 6 March 1943, formed around a cadre drawn from the 628th Tank Destroyer Battalion. After early training on self-propelled tank destroyers, it was converted to a towed battalion equipped with towed 3" anti-tank guns in March 1944. It sailed for the United Kingdom later that year, and was deployed into the European theater in February 1945.

On 20 February, the 648th was attached to the 70th Infantry Division, fighting in the Moselle region on the French-German border. During the next month, the 70th Division captured Saarbrücken and closed off the defending forces in the Saar region in a large pocket.

The battalion was relieved from attachment to the 70th Division on 31 March, and withdrew into reserve to re-equip with self-propelled M18 Hellcat tank destroyers. However, this process was delayed, and was not completed before the end of the war. Elements of the reconnaissance company were attached to the 36th Infantry Division from 11 to 14 April, and the entire battalion returned to combat duties under the command of the 86th Infantry Division on 15 April, operating in Bavaria.

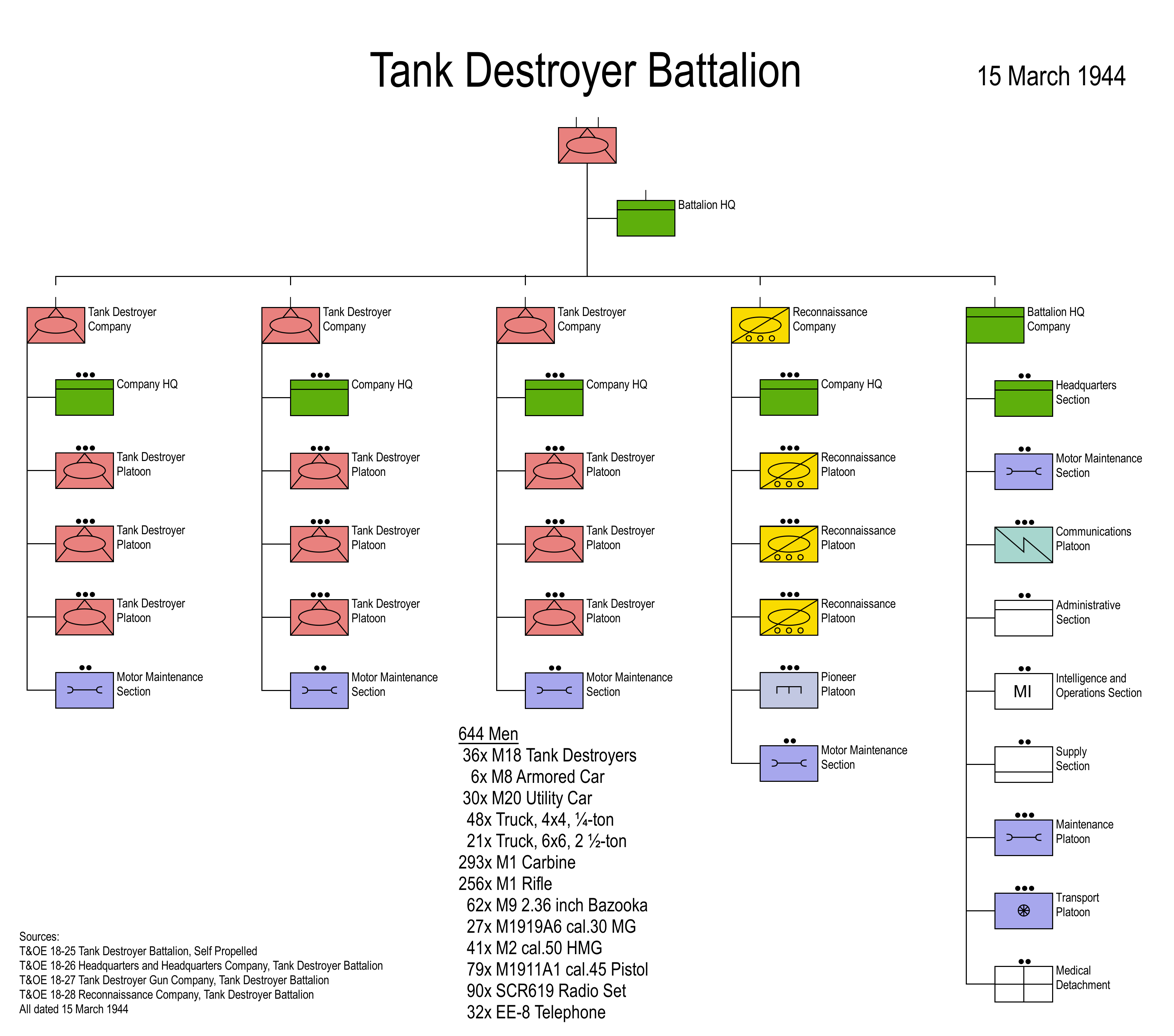
Tank Destroyer Battalion (SP) Structure - March 1944
