= 603rd Tank Destroyer Battalion =

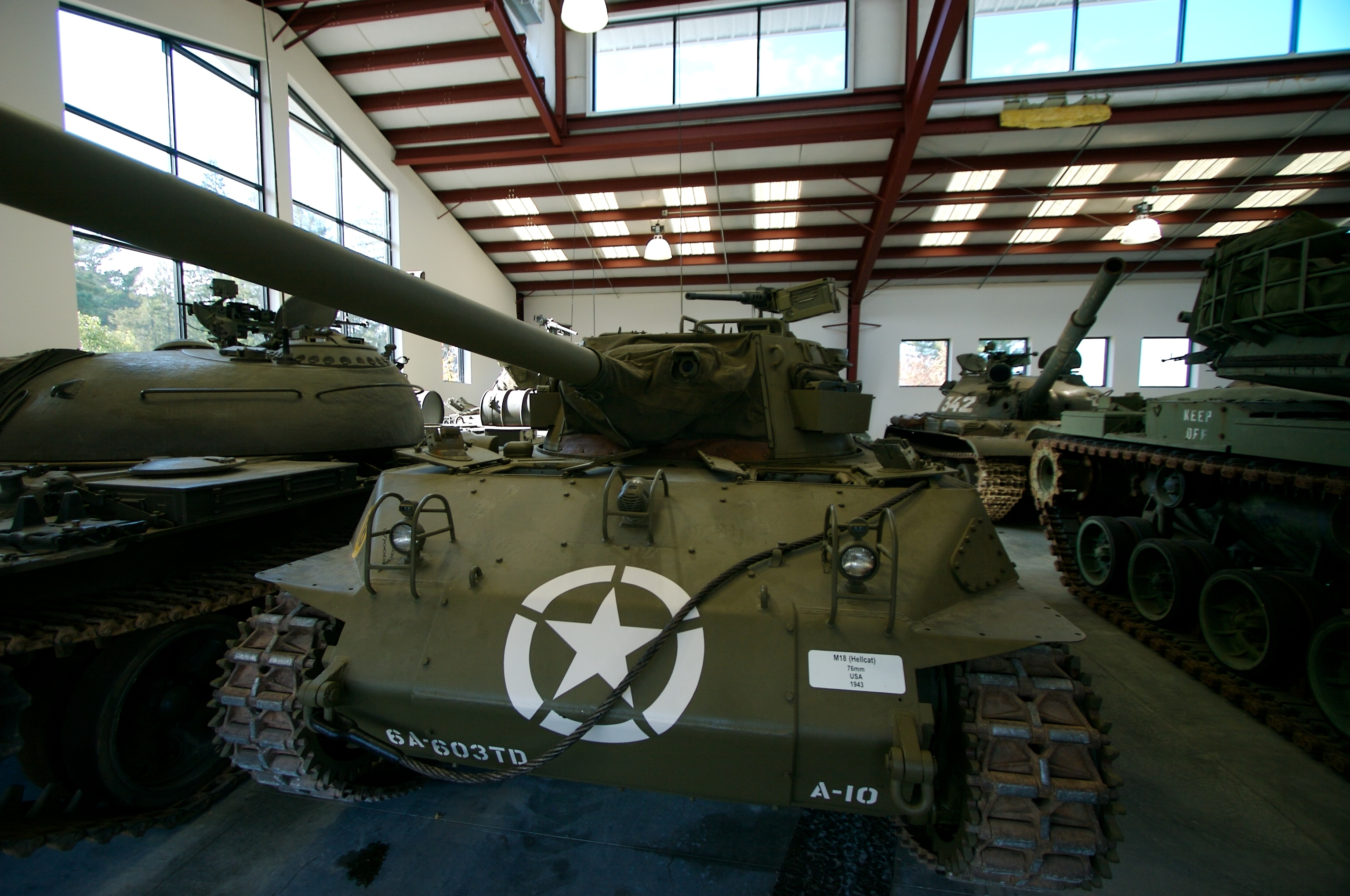
- M18 Hellcat, formerly of the 603rd Battalion, in a museum
- Active: 15 December 1941 – 1945
- Country: United States
- Allegiance: United States Army
- Part of: Independent unit
- Equipment: M18 Hellcat
- Engagements: World War II

The 603rd Tank Destroyer Battalion was a tank destroyer battalion of the United States Army active during World War II.

The battalion was formed in March 1941 as the 3rd Infantry Division Provisional Antitank Battalion, and on 14 December was redesignated as the 603rd Tank Destroyer Battalion, in line with the reorganisation of the anti-tank force. It remained in the United States until 1944, when it was moved to the United Kingdom, deploying into Normandy in late July equipped with M18 Hellcats. The battalion was attached to the 6th Armored Division, with which it would serve for the duration of the campaign in North-West Europe.

It first saw action on 28 July during Operation Cobra, and advanced west into Brittany during the breakout from the Normandy bridgehead, arriving at Brest and moving south to Lorient; it was then ordered east to join Third Army, on the Moselle during the Lorraine Campaign. It fought near Nancy in October, moving up to the Saar in November. It moved north during the Battle of the Bulge, and fought in the counterattack in January 1945, where Corporal Arthur Beyer of C Company won the Medal of Honor for a solitary action on 15 January, near Arloncourt. The battalion crossed the Siegfried Line in February, reached the Rhine on 21 March, and crossed it on the 25th, moving into Germany through the Fulda Gap.

The battalion was present at the liberation of Buchenwald concentration camp on 11 April, halting its advance that week – after elements had pushed as far forward as Tannenberg, on the Czech border – to be deployed in Zeitz as a garrison unit until the end of the war, some weeks later.

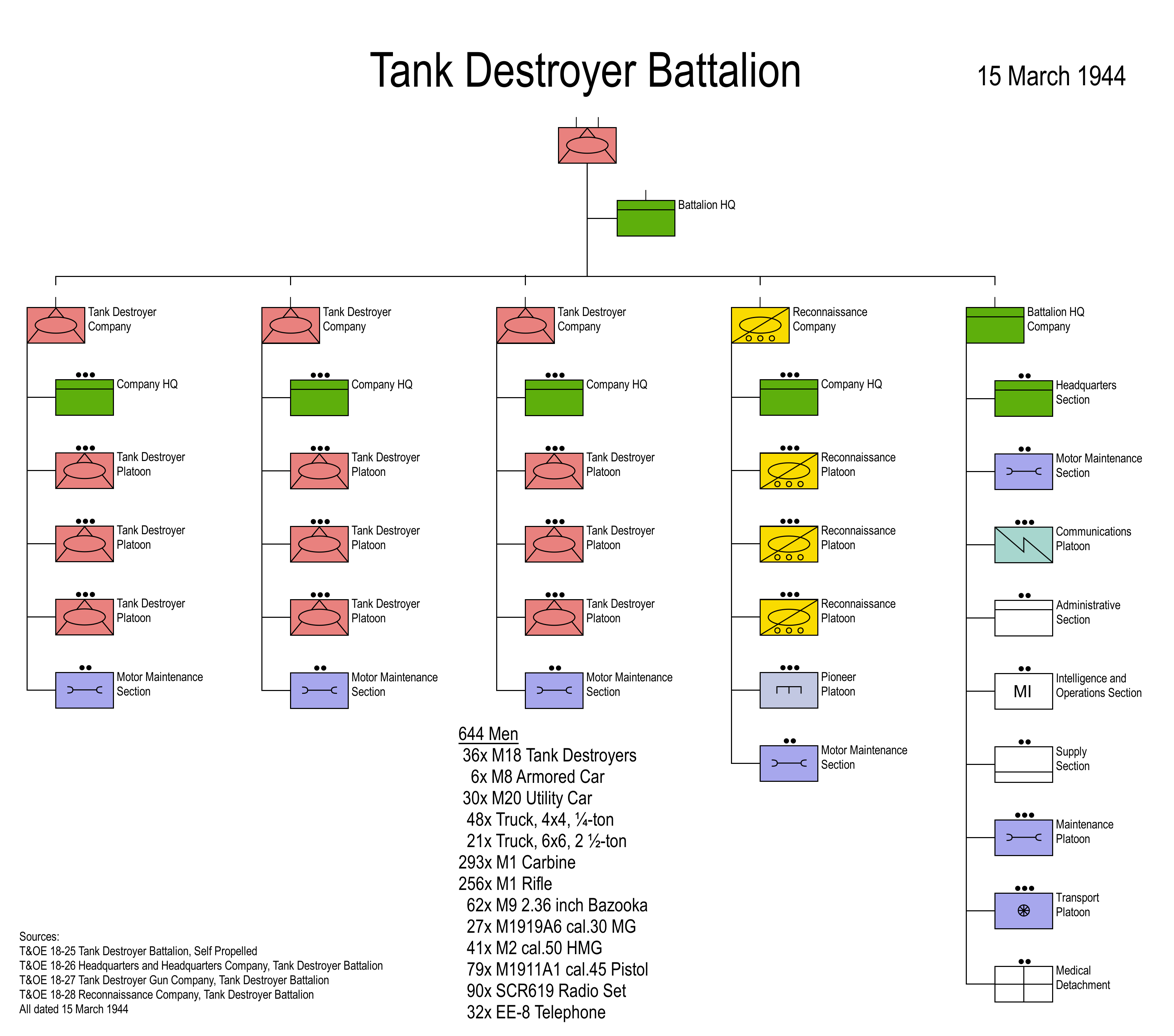
Tank Destroyer Battalion (SP) Structure - March 1944

== Bibliography ==
- Yeide, Harry (2007). The tank killers: a history of America's World War II tank destroyer force. Casemate. ISBN 978-1-932033-80-9.
- Gill, Lonnie (1992). Tank Destroyer Forces, WWII. Turner Publishing Company. ISBN 0-938021-93-1.
