= 605th Tank Destroyer Battalion =

- Active: 16 December 1941 – 1946
- Disbanded: 1946
- Country: United States
- Allegiance: United States Army
- Part of: Independent unit
- Equipment: 3" anti-tank guns
- Engagements: World War II: Operation Varsity

The 605th Tank Destroyer Battalion was a tank destroyer battalion of the United States Army active during World War II.

The battalion was formed in March 1941 as the 5th Infantry Division Provisional Antitank Battalion, and on 16 December was redesignated as the 605th Tank Destroyer Battalion, in line with the reorganisation of the anti-tank force. It remained in the United States until 1944, when it was moved to the United Kingdom, deploying into Normandy in January 1945 equipped with towed 3" anti-tank guns.

It first saw action on 16 February, attached to the 102nd Infantry Division, then crossed the Roer on 24 February and pushed towards the Rhine. It deployed into the Remagen bridgehead on 12 March, and was pulled out on 17 March, to be sent north to support British forces in Belgium. However, it was promptly reattached to the 17th Airborne Division, crossing the Rhine on 25 March as part of Operation Varsity. In April they fought in the capture of the Ruhr Pocket, and crossed the Elbe on 1 May, near Lüneburg.

== Bibliography ==
- Yeide, Harry (2007). The tank killers: a history of America's World War II tank destroyer force. Casemate. ISBN 978-1-932033-80-9.
