= 103rd Armor Regiment =

- Coat of arms
- Active: 1941
- Country: United States
- Branch: Armor Branch (United States)
- Type: Armored regiment
- Colors: Red and yellow
- Engagements: World War II: Northern France; Rhineland; Ardennes Alsace; Central Europe; Operation Enduring Freedom: Germany; Operation Iraqi Freedom: Iraq; Kuwait; Afghanistan Campaign

Insignia
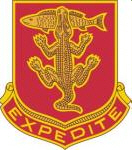
- Distinctive unit insignia

The 103rd Armor Regiment is an armored regiment in the Pennsylvania National Guard first formed in 1941. Its legacy unit, 3rd Battalion, 103rd Armor, is a subordinate command of the 55th Heavy Brigade Combat Team, 28th Infantry Division.

== Lineage ==
- Constituted 3 December 1941 in the Army of the United States as the 628th Tank Destroyer Battalion.
- Activated 15 December 1941 at Indiantown Gap Military Reservation, Pennsylvania.
- Allotted 7 March 1942 to the Pennsylvania National Guard.
- Inactivated 14 November 1945 at Camp Myles Standish, Massachusetts.
- Redesignated 24 May 1946 as the 628th Tank Battalion.
- Organized and Federally recognized 2 May 1949 as the 628th Heavy Tank Battalion, with headquarters at Johnstown, and assigned to the 28th Infantry Division.
- Ordered into active Federal service 5 September 1950 at Johnstown.
- Reorganized and redesignated 20 September 1950 as the 628th Tank Battalion.
- (628th Tank Battalion [NGUS] organized and Federally recognized 6 September 1953 at Johnstown).
- Released from active Federal service 15 June 1954 and reverted to state control; Federal recognition concurrently withdrawn from the 628th Tank Battalion (NGUS).
- Consolidated 1 June 1959 with elements of the 110th Infantry and the 108th and 166th Field Artillery Battalions to form the 103rd Armor, a parent regiment under the Combat Arms Regimental System, to consist of the 1st Reconnaissance Squadron and the 2nd Medium Tank Battalion, elements of the 28th Infantry Division.
- Reorganized 1 May 1962 to consist of the 1st Reconnaissance Squadron and the 2nd Medium Tank Battalion, elements of the 28th Infantry Division, and the 3rd Medium Tank Battalion.
- Reorganized 1 April 1963 to consist of the 1st and 2nd Battalions, elements of the 28th Infantry Division, and the 3rd Medium Tank Battalion.
- Reorganized 24 March 1964 to consist of the 1st and 2nd Battalions, elements of the 28th Infantry Division, and the 3rd Battalion.
- Reorganized 17 February 1968 to consist of the 1st Battalion, an element of the 28th Infantry Division, and the 3rd Battalion.
- Reorganized 1 January 1976 to consist of the 1st Battalion, an element of the 28th Infantry Division.
- Withdrawn 5 April 1988 from the Combat Arms Regimental System and reorganized under the United States Army Regimental System.
- Reorganized 1 March 1992 to consist of the 1st and 2nd Battalions, elements of the 28th Infantry Division.
- Reorganized 1 October 1995 to consist of the 1st, 2nd, and 3rd Battalions, elements of the 28th Infantry Division.
- Ordered into Federal service 24 July 2002 and deployed to Germany for Force Protection duties during Operation Enduring Freedom; released from active Federal service 21 March 2003.
- (2nd Battalion ordered into active Federal service 9 January 2004 at home stations; released from active Federal service 7 July 2005 and reverted to state control).
- Redesignated 1 October 2005 as the 103rd Armored Regiment.
- (Elements of the 1st Battalion ordered into active Federal service 28 June 2004 at home stations; released from active Federal service 9 January 2006 – 1 October 2006 and reverted to state control).
- Reorganized 1 September 2007 to consist of the 3rd Battalion, an element of the 55th Brigade Combat Team, 28th Infantry Division.
- Ordered into active Federal service 3 December 2007 at home stations; released from active Federal service 5 January 2009 and reverted to state control.

== Operation Enduring Freedom ==
=== 3rd Battalion, 103rd Armor ===
In July 2002, A, B, C & HQ Companies of the 3rd Battalion, 103rd Armor were activated to perform Force Protection Operations on Kasernes throughout Germany as Task Force Keystone. Those unites trained at Ft. Dix prior to deployment to Germany. Once in Germany, they took over Security and Force Protection Operations for the U.S. Army Kasernes (posts) throughout Germany. They completed their mission in March 2003.

== Operation Iraqi Freedom ==
=== 2nd Battalion, 103rd Armor ===
In January 2004, B and C Companies of the 2nd Battalion, 103rd Armor were activated and, with attachments from several other Pennsylvania Army National Guard units, reconfigured as military police companies and trained at Ft. Dix for deployment to Iraq. They were designated as companies of the 89th MP Brigade and left for Iraq in March 2004 within days of each other. Once in Iraq, they were assigned to some of the most sensitive missions of OIF II. Three platoons of Bravo Company (1st, 3rd and Headquarters) were attached to the Iraq Survey Group, while 2nd and 4th Platoons served in military police operations. Their missions included area patrols and traffic control points supporting the 1st Marine Division from Camp Fallujah. They were eventually relocated to the Green Zone/International Zone as security escorts attached to the U.S. Navy for high-ranking Interim Iraqi government officials. Charlie Company was assigned to the HVD facility at Camp Cropper, with an entire platoon assigned solely to former Iraqi dictator Saddam Hussein. The units both redeployed in March 2005.

=== 1st Battalion, 103rd Armor ===
In June 2004, the 1st Battalion, 103rd Armor was activated at Fort Bliss, Texas and deployed to Iraq in November for Operation Iraqi Freedom. This marked the first deployment of a 28th ID combat battalion to a war zone since World War II. The battalion, now designated as Task Force Dragoon, was stationed at Forward Operating Base Summerall, near Bayji. Attached initially to the 2nd Brigade, 1st Infantry Division, and then to the 1st Brigade, 3rd Infantry Division, the 800-man TF 1–103rd Armor, commanded by LTC Philip J. Logan, engaged in combat operations for 12 months before redeploying to the United States in November 2005. Thirteen soldiers from TF Dragoon were killed in action during combat operations in Salah Ad Din Province, a heavily Sunni Muslim area in the north part of the "Sunni Triangle".

Task Force 1–103rd Armor (Dragoons)

- June 2004 – December 2004
  - Headquarters and Headquarters Company, 1–103rd Armor
    - A Company, 1st Battalion, 111th Infantry
    - A Company, 1st Battalion, 112th Infantry
    - B Company, 1st Battalion, 103rd Armor
    - C Company, 103rd Engineer Battalion
- December 2004 – March 2005
  - Headquarters and Headquarters Company, 1–103rd Armor (Task Force Headquarters)
    - A Company, 1st Battalion, 111th Infantry (Motorized)
    - B Company, 1st Battalion, 103rd Armor (Motorized)
    - C Company, 1st Battalion, 7th Field Artillery (Mechanized)
    - C Company, 103rd Engineer Battalion (Mechanized)
    - 1st Platoon, A Company, 1st Battalion, 7th Field Artillery (Paladin)
- March 2005 – November 2005
  - Headquarters and Headquarters Company, 1–103rd Armor (Task Force Headquarters)
    - A Company, 1st Battalion, 111th Infantry (Motorized)
    - B Company, 1st Battalion, 103rd Armor (Motorized)
    - B Company, 2nd Battalion 7th Infantry (Mechanized)
    - 173rd Infantry Detachment (Long range Surveillance)
    - C Company, 103rd Engineering Battalion (Motorized)
    - 1st Battalion, A Company, 1st Battalion, 41st Field Artillery (Paladin)

== Campaign credit ==
World War II

- Northern France
- Rhineland
- Ardennes Alsace
- Central Europe

Operation Enduring Freedom

- Germany
- Afghanistan

Operation Iraqi Freedom

- Iraq
- Kuwait

== Decorations ==
- French Croix de Guerre with Silver Star, World War II, Streamer embroidered WALLENDORF

=== 3rd Battalion ===
Headquarters Company, and Company A, 3rd Battalion, additionally entitled to:

- French Croix de Guerre with Palm, World War II, Streamer embroidered COLMAR
- Luxembourg Croix de Guerre, Streamer embroidered LUXEMBOURG

Company A, 3rd Battalion, additionally entitled to:

- Meritorious Unit Commendation (Army), Streamer embroidered IRAQ 2004

Company C, 3rd Battalion, additionally entitled to:

- Meritorious Unit Commendation (Army), Streamer embroidered EUROPEAN THEATER
- Luxembourg Croix de Guerre, Streamer embroidered LUXEMBOURG

Company D, 3rd Battalion, additionally entitled to:

World War II

- Normandy (with arrowhead)
