= Battle of the Bulge order of battle =

Map contrasting German objectives for the Battle of the Bulge with the actual furthest extent of penetration.

The Ardennes Counteroffensive, commonly known as the Battle of the Bulge, was a massive military operation undertaken by Nazi Germany in southern Belgium and northern Luxembourg which lasted from 16 December 1944 until 25 January 1945. The intent of the offensive was to split the ground forces of the Western Allies from each other and encourage them to make peace with Germany, leaving all of Germany's military might to fight off the resurgent USSR.

The operation was conceived entirely by German head of state and armed forces chief Adolf Hitler. The plan was vigorously opposed by the two ranking generals who would oversee the assault, who saw only a waste of men and material with little chance of success. The Führer dismissed all objections, convinced that the elite German forces would roll over the war-weary and/or inexperienced American formations in the Ardennes Forest and drive all the way to the English Channel port of Antwerp.

In order to mislead any Allied intelligence personnel who might discover the plan, it was given the defensive sounding name Wacht am Rhein, meaning "watch on the Rhine".

The order of battle presented here reflects a point near the end of the campaign. As with any large army organization in extended combat, forces and their assignments shifted over the course of the battle. For example, when the German attack began on 16 December, the US 7th Armored Division was assigned to XIII Corps, US Ninth Army, 12th Army Group. Later that day, its alignment became VIII Corps, US First Army, 12th Army Group. On 20 December, the alignment switched to XVIII Corps, US First Army, 12th Army Group — and later that day to XVIII Corps, US First Army, 21st Army Group. On 18 January 1945, the alignment changed one last time, to XVIII Corps, US First Army, 12th Army Group — as it is given in the following hierarchy. This OOB — specifically, at a point near the end of the battle, which lasted from 16 December 1944 until 25 January 1945.

See for Allied and German Orders of Battle: December 1944 & January 1945: (Tucker-Jones pp 263–287)

== High-level orders of battle ==
=== Axis ===
Theatre and army group commanders

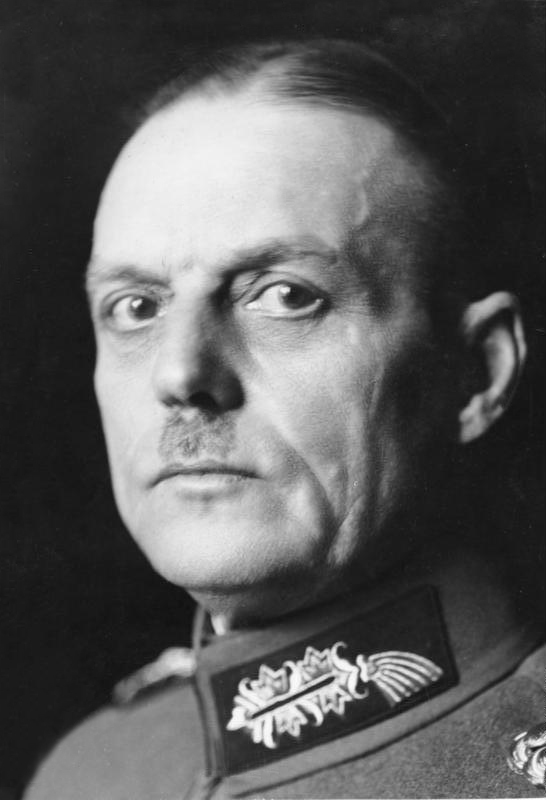
Gerd von Runstedt

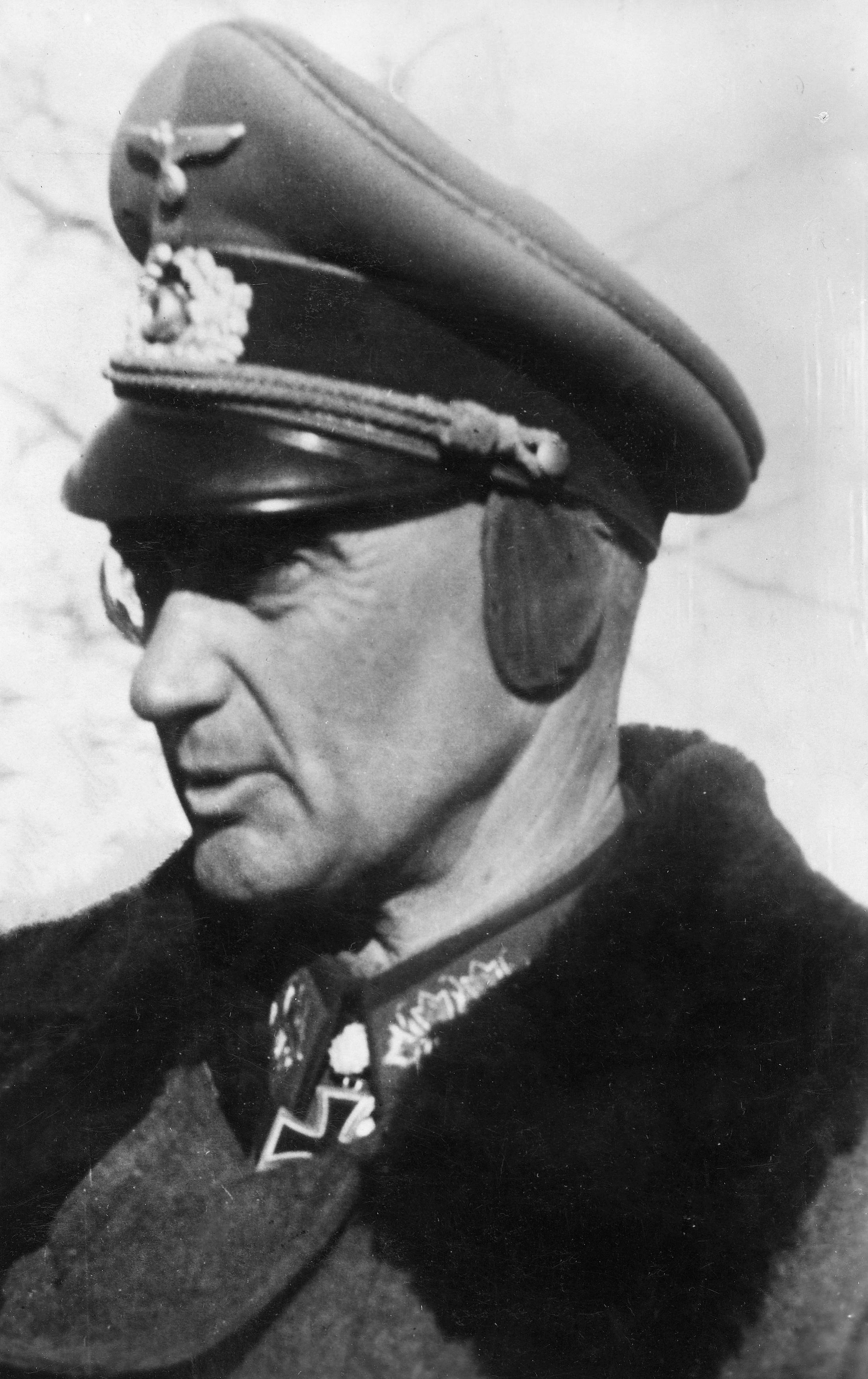
Walter Model

Oberbefehlshaber West
Generalfeldmarschall Gerd von Rundstedt (Note: Both Runstedt and Model were deeply skeptical of the offensive's chances of success, but Hitler ignored all their objections. Runstedt in particular was miffed when he learned that the Allies were referring to the operation as the "Runstedt offensive." [Beevor, p. 82])

Heeresgruppe B
Generalfeldmarschall Walter Model (Note: Both Runstedt and Model were deeply skeptical of the offensive's chances of success, but Hitler ignored all their objections. [Beevor, p. 82])

Armies deployed North to South:

(Nazi Germany) Sixth Panzer Army (Northern Sector)
Oberstgruppenführer der Waffen SS Josef "Sepp" Dietrich (Note: In contrast with Manteuffel, Dietrich opened the offensive on his front with a massive artillery bombardment. [Beevor, p. 112])

I SS Panzer Corps (SS-Gruppenführer Hermann Priess)
II SS Panzer Corps (SS-Obergruppenführer Willi Bittrich)
LXVII Corps (Generalleutnant Otto Hitzfeld)

(Nazi Germany) Fifth Panzer Army (Central Sector)
General der Panzertruppen Hasso von Manteuffel (Note: Manteuffel disregarded Hitler's desire for an opening artillery bombardment; he felt such an action was "a World War I concept and completely out of place in the Ardennes, in view of the thinly held lines," and would only serve to destroy the element of surprise. [Beevor, p. 112])

XXXIX Panzer Corps (General der Panzertruppe Karl Decker)
XLVII Panzer Corps (General der Panzertruppen Heinrich Freiherr von Lüttwitz)
LVIII Panzer Corps (General der Panzertruppen Walter Krüger)
LXVI Corps (General der Artillerie Walter Lucht)

(Nazi Germany) Seventh Army (Southern Sector)
General der Panzertruppen Erich Brandenberger

LIII Corps (General der Kavallerie Edwin von Rothkirch)
LXXX Corps (General der Infanterie Franz Beyer)
LXXXV Corps (General der Infanterie Baptist Kniess)

=== Allies ===
Allied theatre commander

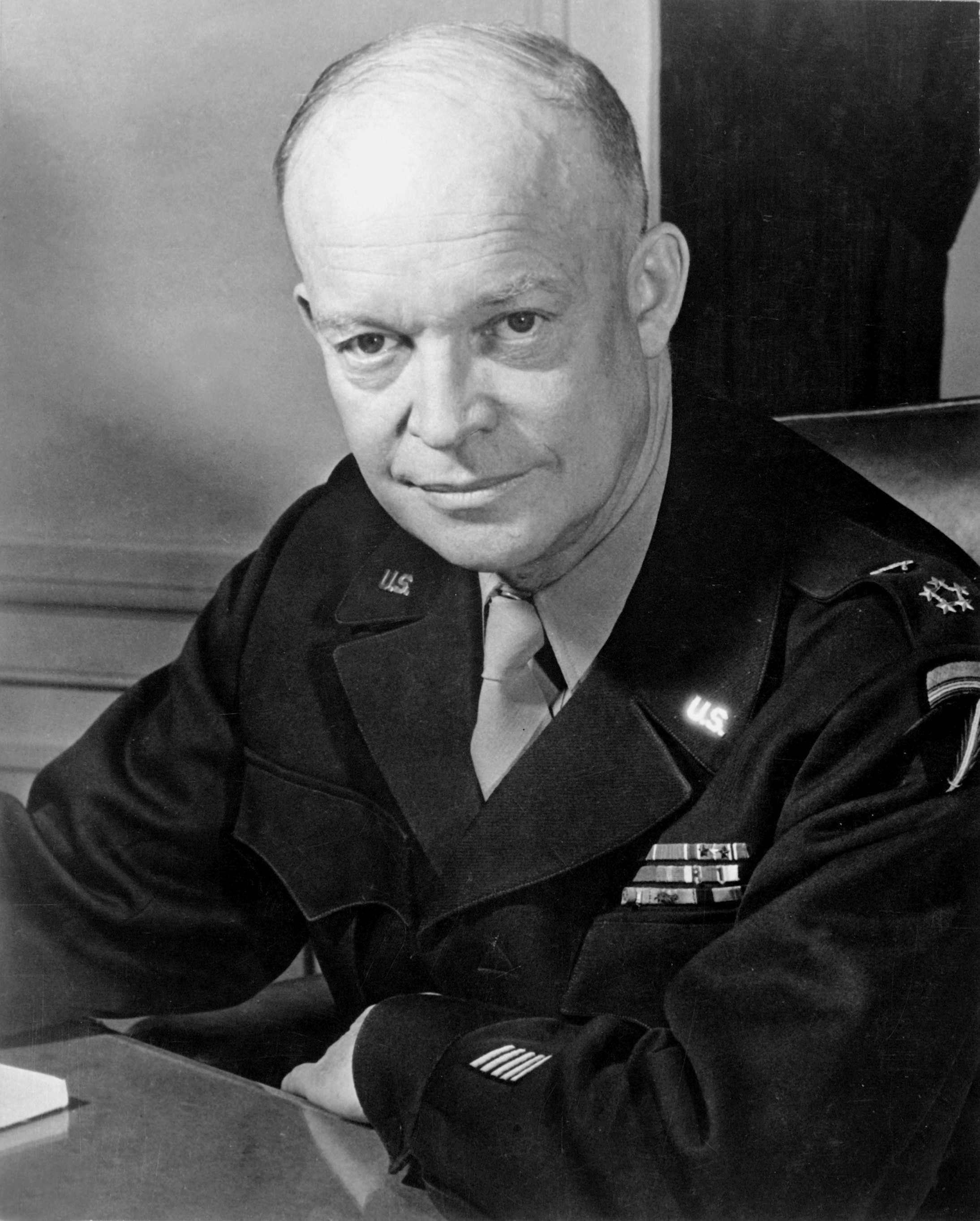
(United States) Dwight D. Eisenhower

Allied army group commanders

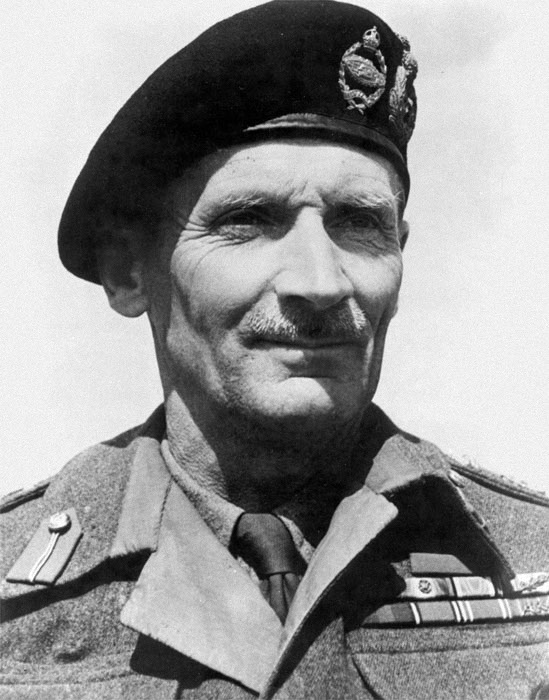
Bernard L. Montgomery

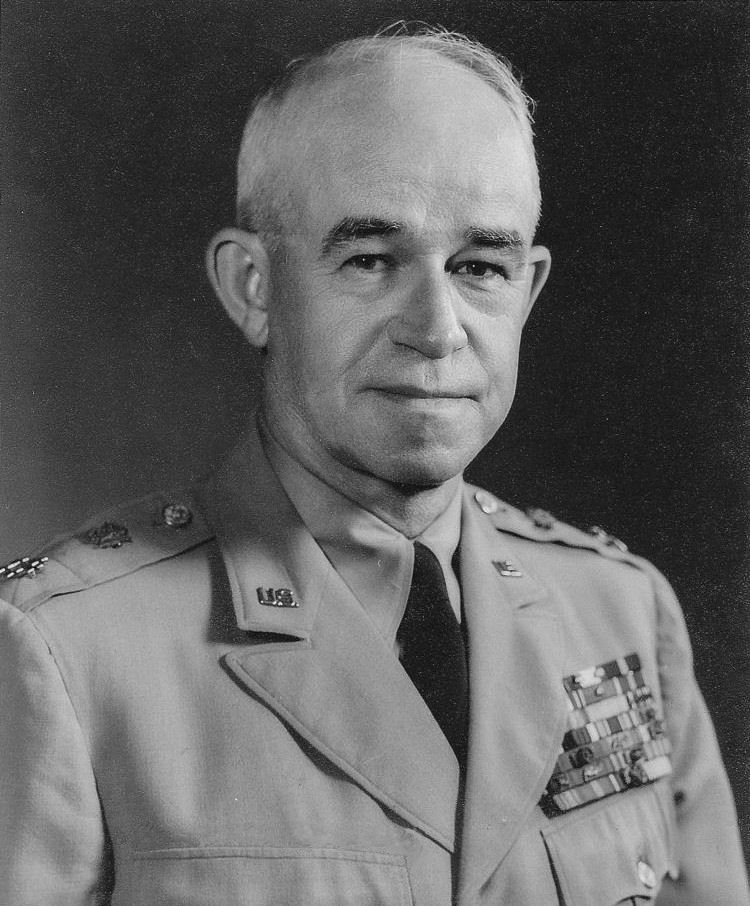
(United States) Omar N. Bradley

Supreme Headquarters Allied Expeditionary Forces
General of the Army Dwight D. Eisenhower

Armies deployed North to South:

21st Army Group

Field Marshal Sir Bernard Law Montgomery

UK XXX Corps (Lt-Gen. Brian G. Horrocks)

12th Army Group

Lieutenant General Omar N. Bradley

US First Army (Lieut. Gen. Courtney H. Hodges)

V Corps (Maj. Gen. Leonard T. Gerow)
VII Corps (Maj. Gen. J. Lawton Collins)
XVIII Airborne Corps (Maj. Gen. Matthew B. Ridgway)

US Third Army (Lieut. Gen. George S. Patton Jr.)

III Corps (Maj. Gen. John Millikin)
VIII Corps (Maj. Gen. Troy H. Middleton)
XII Corps (Maj. Gen. Manton S. Eddy)

Allied air forces

US Strategic Air Forces in Europe (General Carl Spaatz)

US Eighth Air Force (Strategic) (Lt. Gen. James H. Doolittle)
US Ninth Air Force (Tactical) (Lt. Gen. Hoyt S. Vandenberg)

Royal Air Force

Bomber Command (Air Chief Marshal Sir Arthur "Bomber" Harris)
Fighter Command (Air Marshal Sir Roderic Hill)
Second Tactical Air Force (Air Marshal Sir Arthur Coningham)

== Axis forces ==
=== Sixth Panzer Army (Northern Sector) ===
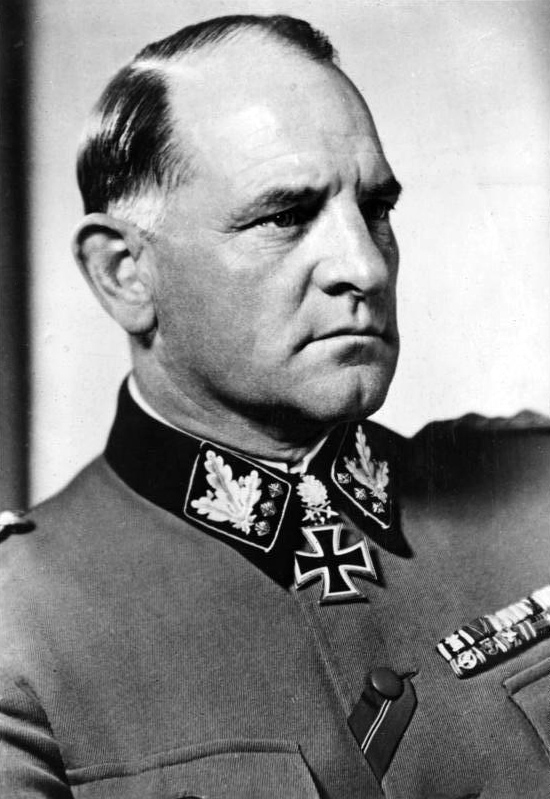
Josef "Sepp" Dietrich

Oberstgruppenführer der Waffen SS Josef "Sepp" Dietrich (Note: In contrast with Manteuffel, Dietrich opened the offensive on his front with a massive artillery bombardment. [Beevor, p. 112])

Army-level units

683rd Heavy Antitank Battalion
217th Assault Panzer Battalion
394th, 667th, and 902nd Assault Gun Battalions
741st Antitank Battalion
1098th, 1110th, and 1120th Heavy Howitzer Batteries
428th Heavy Mortar Battery
1123rd K-3 Battery
2nd Flak Division (41st and 43rd Regiments)
von der Heydte Fallschirmjager Battalion
4th Todt Brigade

==== LXVII Corps ====
Generalleutnant Otto Hitzfeld
‡ Units involved in the initial assault 16 Dec

Corps-level units

17th Volkswerfer Brigade (88th and 89th Werfer Regiments)
405th Volksartillerie Corps
1001st Heavy Assault Gun Company

3rd Panzergrenadier Division
Generalmajor Walter Denkert

8th and 29th Panzergrenadier Regiments
103rd Panzer Battalion
3rd Artillery Regiment
103rd Recon Battalion
3rd Antitank Battalion
3rd Engineer Battalion
3rd Flak Battalion
3rd Signals Battalion

246th Volksgrenadier Division
Oberst Peter Körte

352nd, 404th, and 689th VG Regiments
246th Artillery Regiment
246th Antitank Battalion
246th Engineer Battalion
246th Signals Battalion

272nd Volksgrenadier Division
Generalmajor Eugen König

980th, 981st, and 982nd Volksgrenadier Regiments
272nd Artillery Regiment
272nd Antitank Battalion
272nd Engineer Battalion
272nd Signals Battalion

326th Volksgrenadier Division ‡
Oberst Erwin Kaschner

751st, 752nd, and 753rd Volksgrenadier Regiments
326th Artillery Regiment
326th Antitank Battalion
326th Engineer Battalion
326th Signals Battalion

==== I SS Panzer Corps ====
SS-Gruppenführer Hermann Prieß
‡ Units involved in the initial assault 16 Dec

Corps-level units

4th Volkswerfer Brigade (51st and 53rd Werfer Regiments)
9th Volkswerfer Brigade (14th and 54th Werfer Regiments)
388th Volksartillerie Corps
402nd Volksartillerie Corps
501st SS-Artillery Battalion
501st SS-Artillery Observation Battalion

1st SS Panzer Division Leibstandarte Adolf Hitler ‡
SS Oberführer Wilhelm Mohnke

1st SS Panzer Regiment
1st and 2nd SS Panzergrenadier Regiments
1st SS Artillery Regiment
1st SS Recon Battalion
1st SS Antitank Battalion
1st SS Engineer Battalion
1st SS Flak Battalion
1st SS Signals Battalion
501st SS Heavy Panzer Battalion (attached)
84th Luftwaffe Flak Battalion (attached)

3rd Fallschirmjäger Division ‡
Generalmajor Walther Wadehn

5th, 8th, and 9th Parachute Infantry Regiments
3rd Artillery Regiment
3rd Recon Battalion
3rd Antitank Battalion
3rd Engineer Battalion
3rd Signals battalion

12th SS Panzer Division Hitler Jugend ‡
SS Standartenführer Hugo Kraas

12th SS Panzer Regiment
25th and 26th SS Panzergrenadier Regiments
12th SS Artillery Regiment
12th SS Recon Battalion
12th SS Antitank Battalion
12th SS Engineer Battalion
12th SS Flak Battalion
560th Heavy Antitank Battalion (attached)

12th Volksgrenadier Division ‡
Generalmajor Gerhard Engel

27th Fusilier and 48th and 89th Volksgrenadier Regiments
12th Artillery Regiment
12th Antitank Battalion
12th Fusilier Battalion
12th Engineer Battalion
12th Signals Battalion

277th Volksgrenadier Division ‡
Oberst Wilhelm Viebig

989th, 990th, and 991st Volksgrenadier Regiments
277th Artillery Regiment
277th Antitank Battalion
277th Engineer Battalion
277th Signals Battalion

150th Panzer Brigade ‡
Obersturmbannführer der Waffen SS Otto Skorzeny

Two Panzer companies
Two Panzergrenadier companies
Two antitank companies
A heavy mortar battalion (two batteries)
600th SS Parachute Battalion Kampfgruppe 200 (Luftwaffe ground unit)
An anti-partisan company

==== II SS Panzer Corps ====
SS Obergruppenführer Willi Bittrich

Corps-level units

410th Volksartillerie Corps
502nd SS Heavy Artillery Battalion
502nd SS Artillery Observation Battalion

2nd SS Panzer Division Das Reich
SS Brigadeführer Heinz Lammerding

2nd SS Panzer Regiment
3rd and 4th SS Panzergrenadier Regiments
2nd SS Artillery Regiment
2nd SS Recon Battalion
2nd SS Engineer Battalion
2nd SS Flak Battalion
2nd SS Signals Battalion

9th SS Panzer Division Hohenstaufen
SS Oberführer Sylvester Stadler

9th SS Panzer Regiment
19th and 20th SS Panzergrenadier Regiments
9th SS Artillery Regiment
9th SS Recon Battalion
9th SS Antitank Battalion
9th SS Engineer Battalion
9th SS Flak Battalion
9th SS Signals Battalion
519th Heavy Antitank Battalion (attached)

=== Fifth Panzer Army (Central Sector) ===
General der Panzertruppen Hasso von Manteuffel (Note: Manteuffel disregarded Hitler's desire for an opening artillery bombardment; he felt such an action was "a World War I concept and completely out of place in the Ardennes, in view of the thinly held lines," and would only serve to destroy the element of surprise. [Beevor, p. 112])

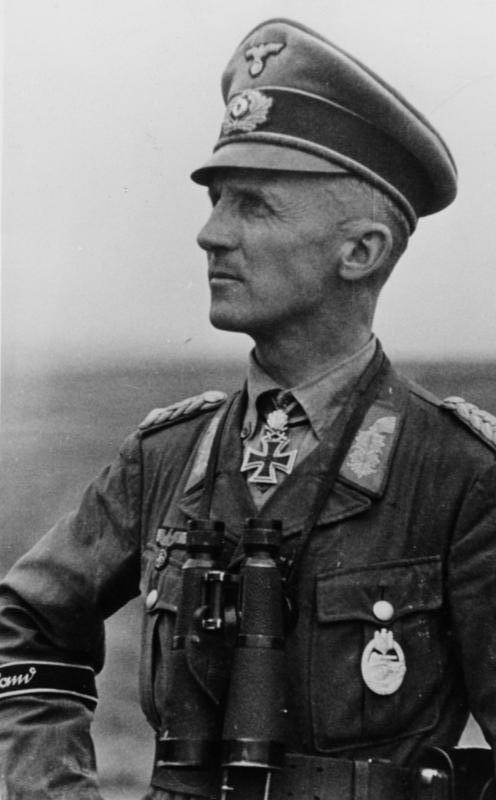
Hasso von Manteuffel

Army-level units

19th Flak Brigade
207th and 600th Engineer Battalions
653rd Heavy Panzerjäger Battalion
669th Ost (East) Battalion
638th, 1094th, and 1095th Heavy Artillery Batteries
25th/975th Fortress Artillery Battery
1099th, 1119th, and 1121st Heavy Mortar Batteries
3rd Todt Brigade (paramilitary engineers)

==== LXVI Corps ====
General der Artillerie Walter Lucht

Corps-level units

16th Volkswerfer Brigade (86th and 87th Werfer Regiments)
244th Assault Gun Brigade
460th Heavy Artillery Battalion

18th Volksgrenadier Division ‡
Oberst Günther Hoffmann-Schönborn

293rd, 294th, and 295th Volksgrenadier Regiments
1818th Artillery Regiment
1818th Antitank Battalion
1818th Engineer Battalion
1818th Signals Battalion

62nd Volksgrenadier Division ‡
Oberst Friedrich Kittel

164th, 193rd, and 190th Volksgrenadier Regiments
162nd Artillery Regiment
162nd Antitank Battalion
162nd Engineer Battalion
162nd Signals Battalion

==== LVIII Panzer Corps ====
General der Panzertruppen Walter Krüger

Corps-level units

7th Volkswerfer Brigade (84th and 85th Werfer Regiments)
401st Volksartillerie Corps
1st Flak Regiment

116th Panzer Division ‡
Generalmajor Siegfried von Waldenburg

16th Panzer Regiment
60th and 156th Panzergrenadier Regiments
146th Artillery Regiment
116th Armored Recon Battalion
226th Antitank Battalion
675th Engineer Battalion
281st Flak Battalion

560th Volksgrenadier Division ‡
Oberst Rudolf Langhauser

1128th, 1129th, and 1130th Volksgrenadier Regiments
1560th Artillery Regiment
1560th Antitank Battalion
1560th Engineer Battalion
1560th Signals Battalion

==== XLVII Panzer Corps ====
General der Panzertruppen Heinrich Freiherr von Lüttwitz

Corps-level units

15th Volkswerfer Brigade
182nd Flak Regiment
766th Volksartillerie Corps

2nd Panzer Division ‡
Oberst Meinrad von Lauchert

3rd Panzer Regiment
2nd and 304th Panzergrenadier Regiments
74th Artillery Regiment
2nd Recon Battalion
38th Antitank Battalion
38th Engineer Battalion
273rd Flak Battalion
38th Signals Battalion

9th Panzer Division
Generalmajor Harald Freiherr von Elverfeldt

33rd Panzer Regiment
10th and 11th Panzergrenadier Regiments
102nd Artillery Regiment
9th Recon Battalion
50th Antitank Battalion
86th Engineer Battalion
287th Flak Battalion
81st Signals Battalion
301st Heavy Panzer Battalion (attached)

Panzer-Lehr-Division ‡
Generalleutnant Fritz Bayerlein

130th Panzer Regiment
901st and 902nd Panzergrenadier Regiments
130th Artillery Regiment
130th Recon Battalion
130th Antitank Battalion
130th Engineer Battalion
311th Flak Battalion
559th Antitank Battalion (attached)
243rd Assault Gun Brigade (attached)

26th Volksgrenadier Division ‡
Generalmajor Heinz Kokott

39th Fusilier and 77th and 78th Volksgrenadier Regiments
26th Artillery Regiment
26th Recon Battalion
26th Antitank Battalion
26th Engineer Battalion
26th Signals Battalion

Führer Begleit Brigade
Oberst Otto Remer

102nd Panzer Battalion
100th Panzergrenadier Regiment
120th Artillery Regiment
120th Recon Battalion
120th Engineer Battalion
828th Grenadier Battalion
673rd Antitank Battalion

==== XXXIX Panzer Corps ====
Generalleutnant Karl Decker

167th Volksgrenadier Division
Generalleutnant Hanskurt Höcker

331st, 339th, 387th Volksgrenadier Regiments
167th Artillery Regiment
167th Antitank Battalion
167th Engineer Battalion
167th Signals Battalion

=== Seventh Army (Southern Sector) ===
General der Panzertruppen Erich Brandenberger

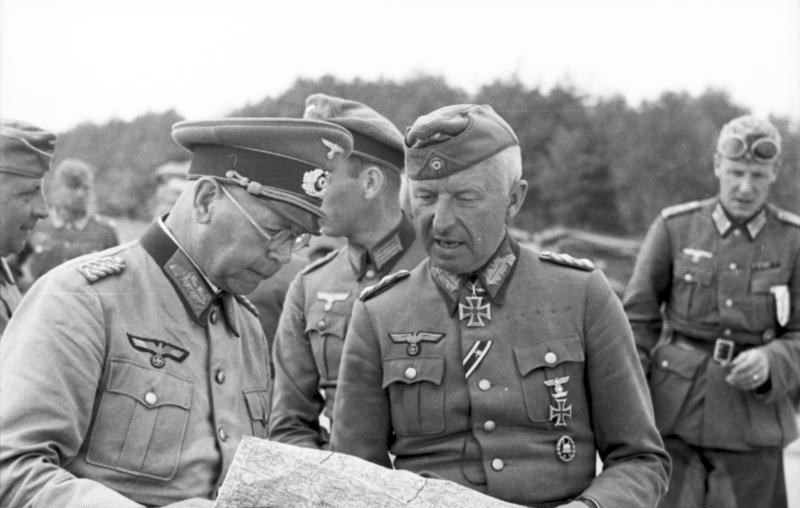
Erich Brandenberger (left) with Erich von Manstein, 1941

Army-level units

657th and 668th Heavy Antitank Battalions
501st Fortress Antitank Battalion
47th Engineer Battalion
1092nd, 1093rd, 1124th, and 1125th Heavy Howitzer Batteries
660th Heavy Artillery Battery
1029th, 1039th, and 1122nd Heavy Mortar Batteries
999th Penal Battalion
44th Machine Gun Battalion
15th Flak Regiment
1st Todt Brigade

==== LXXXV Corps ====
General der Infanterie Baptist Knieß

Corps-level units

406th Volksartillerie Corps
18th Volkswerfer Brigade (21st and 22nd Werfer Regiments)

5th Fallschirmjäger Division ‡
Generalmajor Ludwig Heilmann

13th, 14th, and 15th Parachute Infantry Regiments
5th Artillery Regiment
5th Recon Battalion
5th Engineer Battalion
5th Flak Battalion
11th Assault Gun Brigade

352nd Volksgrenadier Division ‡
Oberst Erich-Otto Schmidt

914th, 915th, and 916th Volksgrenadier Regiments
352nd Artillery Regiment
352nd Antitank Battalion
352nd Engineer Battalion
352nd Signals Battalion

79th Volksgrenadier Division
Oberst Alois Weber

208th, 212th, and 226th Volksgrenadier Regiments
179th Artillery Regiments
179th Antitank Battalion
179th Engineer Battalion
179th Signals Battalion

==== LXXX Corps ====
General der Infanterie Franz Beyer

Corps-level units

408th Volksartillerie Corps
8th Volkswerfer Brigade
2nd and Lehr Werfer Regiments

212th Volksgrenadier Division ‡
Generalmajor Franz Sensfuß

316th, 320th, and 423rd VG Regiments
212th Artillery Regiment
212th Antitank Battalion
212th Engineer Battalion
212th Signals Battalion

276th Volksgrenadier Division ‡
Generalmajor Kurt Möhring (Note: Later Oberst Hugo Dempwolff)

986th, 987th, and 988th VG Regiments
276th Artillery Regiment
276th Antitank Battalion
276th Engineer Battalion
276th Signals Battalion

340th Volksgrenadier Division
Oberst Theodor Tolsdorff

694th, 695th, and 696th VG Regiments
340th Artillery Regiment
340th Antitank Battalion
340th Engineer Battalion
340th Signals Battalion

==== LIII Corps ====
General der Kavallerie Edwin von Rothkirch

9th Volksgrenadier Division
Oberst Werner Kolb

36th, 57th, and 116th VG Regiments
9th Artillery Regiment
9th Antitank Battalion
9th Engineer Battalion
9th Signals Battalion

15th Panzergrenadier Division
Oberst Hans Joachim Deckert

104th and 115th Pzgr Regiments
115th Panzer Battalion
115th Artillery Regiment
115th Recon Battalion
33rd Antitank Battalion
33rd Engineer Battalion
33rd Flak Battalion
33rd Signals Battalion

Führer Grenadier Brigade
Oberst Hans-Joachim Kahler

99th Pzgr Regiment
101st Panzer Battalion
911th Assault Gun Brigade
124th Antitank Battalion
124th Engineer Battalion
124th Flak Battalion
124th Artillery Regiment

=== Luftwaffe ===
II Fighter Corps

Generalmajor Dietrich Peltz

III Flak Corps

Generalleutnant Wolfgang Pickert

== Allied Forces ==
Armies deployed north to south

=== British 21st Army Group ===
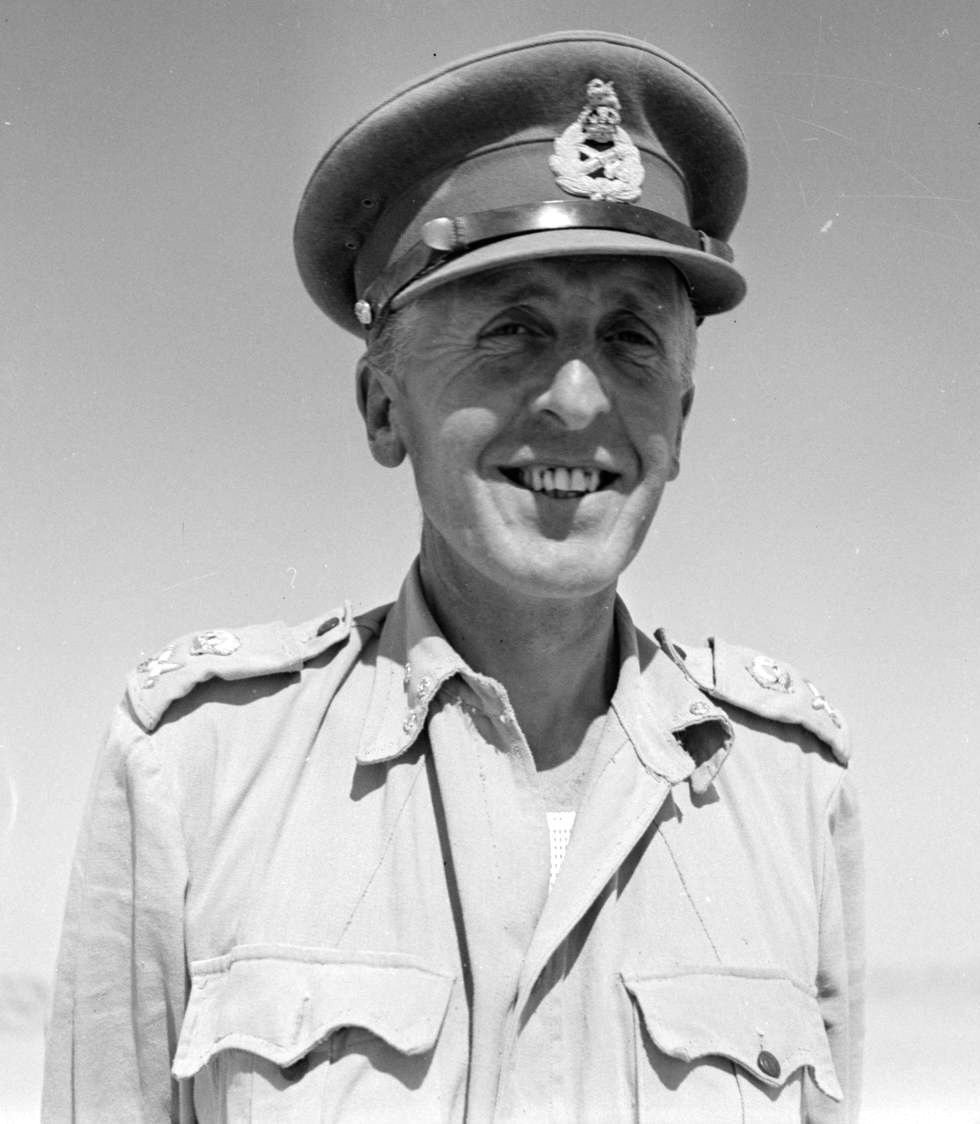
Lt. Gen. Brian G. Horrocks

Field Marshal Sir Bernard L. Montgomery

==== XXX Corps ====
Lt-Gen. Brian G. Horrocks

2nd Household Cavalry Regiment
11th Hussars
4th Regiment, Royal Horse Artillery
5th Regiment, Royal Horse Artillery
73rd Antitank Regiment, Royal Artillery
7th, 64th, and 84th Medium Regiments, Royal Artillery
27th Light AA Regiment, Royal Artillery

6th Airborne Division
Maj-Gen. Eric Bols

3rd Parachute Brigade

8th (Midlands) Parachute Battalion
9th (Eastern and Home Counties) Parachute Battalion
1st Canadian Parachute Battalion

5th Parachute Brigade

7th (Light Infantry) Parachute Battalion
12th (Yorkshire) Parachute Battalion
13th (Lancashire) Parachute Battalion

6th Airlanding Brigade

12th Battalion, Devonshire Regiment
2nd Battalion, Oxfordshire and Buckinghamshire Light Infantry
1st Battalion, Royal Ulster Rifles

53rd Light Regiment, Royal Artillery
3rd and 4th Airlanding Anti-Tank Batteries, Royal Artillery
6th Airborne Armoured Reconnaissance Regiment, Royal Armoured Corps
249th Airborne Field Company Royal Engineers
3rd, 591st Parachute Squadrons Royal Engineers
3rd, 9th Airborne Squadrons Royal Engineers
286th Airborne Field Park Company Royal Engineers
6th Airborne Divisional Signals Company Royal Signals
22nd Independent Parachute Company Army Air Corps

51st Infantry Division
Maj-Gen. G T.G. Rennie

152nd Infantry Brigade

2nd Battalion, Seaforth Highlanders
5th Battalion, Seaforth Highlanders
5th Battalion, Queen's Own Cameron Highlanders

153rd Infantry Brigade

5th Battalion, Black Watch
1st Battalion, Gordon Highlanders
5/7th Battalion, Gordon Highlanders

154th Infantry Brigade

1st Battalion, Black Watch
7th Battalion, Black Watch
7th Battalion, Argyll and Sutherland Highlanders

126th, 127th, and 128th Field Regiments, Royal Artillery
2nd Derbyshire Yeomanry
61st Antitank Regiment, Royal Artillery
40th Light AA Regiment, Royal Artillery
274th, 275th, and 276th Field Companies Royal Engineers
239th Field Park Company Royal Engineers
16th Bridging Platoon Royal Engineers
51st Divisional Signals Company Royal Signals
1/7th Machine Gun Battalion Middlesex Regiment

53rd Infantry Division
Maj-Gen. Robert Knox Ross

71st Infantry Brigade

1st Battalion, Oxfordshire and Buckinghamshire Light Infantry
1st Battalion, Highland Light Infantry
4th Battalion, Royal Welch Fusiliers

158th Infantry Brigade

7th Battalion, Royal Welch Fusiliers
1/5th Battalion, Welch Regiment
1st Battalion, East Lancashire Regiment

160th Infantry Brigade

2nd Battalion, Monmouthshire Regiment
1/5th Battalion, Welch Regiment
6th Battalion, Royal Welch Fusiliers

81st, 83rd, and 133rd Field Regiments, Royal Artillery
53rd Recce Regiment, Royal Armoured Corps
71st Antitank Regiment, Royal Artillery
25th Light AA Regiment, Royal Artillery
244th, 282nd, and 555th Field Companies Royal Engineers
285th Field Park Company Royal Engineers
22nd Bridging Platoon Royal Engineers
53rd Divisional Signals Company Royal Signals
1st Machine Gun Battalion Manchester Regiment

29th Armoured Brigade
Brig. C.B.C Harvey

23rd Hussars
3rd Royal Tank Regiment
2nd Fife and Forfar Yeomanry
8th Battalion, Rifle Brigade

33rd Armoured Brigade
Brig. H.B. Scott

144th Regiment Royal Armoured Corps
1st Northamptonshire Yeomanry
1st East Riding Yeomanry

34th Army Tank Brigade
Brig. G W.S. Clarke

9th Royal Tank Regiment
107th Regiment Royal Armoured Corps
147th Regiment Royal Armoured Corps

==== Corps Reserve ====
Guards Armoured Division
Maj.-Gen. Allan Henry Shafto Adair

5th Guards Armoured Brigade

2nd Battalion, Grenadier Guards
1st Battalion, Coldstream Guards
2nd Battalion, Irish Guards
1st Battalion, Grenadier Guards (Mechanized)

32nd Guards Brigade

5th Battalion, Coldstream Guards
3rd Battalion, Irish Guards
1st Battalion, Welsh Guards

2nd Battalion, Welsh Guards (Recce)
14th Field Company, Royal Engineers
615th Field Company, Royal Engineers
53rd Field Regiment, Royal Artillery
153rd Field Regiment, Royal Artillery
21st Anti-Tank Regiment, Royal Artillery
94th Light Anti-Aircraft Regiment, Royal Artillery

43rd Infantry Division
Maj-Gen. Ivor Thomas

129th Infantry Brigade

4th Battalion, Somerset Light Infantry
4th Battalion, Wiltshire Regiment
5th Battalion, Wiltshire Regiment

130th Infantry Brigade

7th Battalion, Hampshire Regiment
4th Battalion, Dorsetshire Regiment
5th Battalion, Dorsetshire Regiment

214th Infantry Brigade

7th Battalion, Somerset Light Infantry
1st Battalion, Worcestershire Regiment
5th Battalion, Duke of Cornwall's Light Infantry

8th Battalion, Middlesex Regiment (Vickers Machine Gunners)
43rd Reconnaissance Regiment, Royal Armoured Corps
94th Field Regiment, Royal Artillery
112th Field Regiment, Royal Artillery
179th Field Regiment, Royal Artillery
59th Anti-Tank Regiment, Royal Artillery
13th Bridging Platoon, Royal Engineers
204th Field Company, Royal Engineers
207th Field Park Company, Royal Engineers (from Bath, Somerset).
260th Field Company, Royal Engineers (from Chippenham, Wiltshire).
553rd Field Company, Royal Engineers
54th Company, RASC
504th Company, RASC
505th Company, RASC
506th Divisional Company, RASC
110th Light Anti Aircraft Regiment, Royal Artillery

50th Infantry Division
Maj-Gen. Douglas Alexander Graham

69th Infantry Brigade

5th Battalion, East Yorkshire Regiment
6th Battalion, Green Howards
7th Battalion, Green Howards

151st Infantry Brigade

6th Battalion, Durham Light Infantry
8th Battalion, Durham Light Infantry
9th Battalion, Durham Light Infantry

231st Infantry Brigade

1st Battalion, Hampshire Regiment
1st Battalion, Dorsetshire Regiment
1st/7th Battalion, Queen's (Royal West Surrey Regiment)
2nd Battalion, Cheshire Regiment

74th Field Regiment, Royal Artillery
90th Field Regiment, Royal Artillery
124th Field Regiment, Royal Artillery
102nd Anti-Tank Regiment (Northumberland Hussars), Royal Artillery
25th Light Anti-Aircraft Regiment, Royal Artillery
233rd Field Company, Royal Engineers
501st Field Company, Royal Engineers
505th Field Company, Royal Engineers
235th Field Park Company, Royal Engineers

=== U.S. 12th Army Group ===
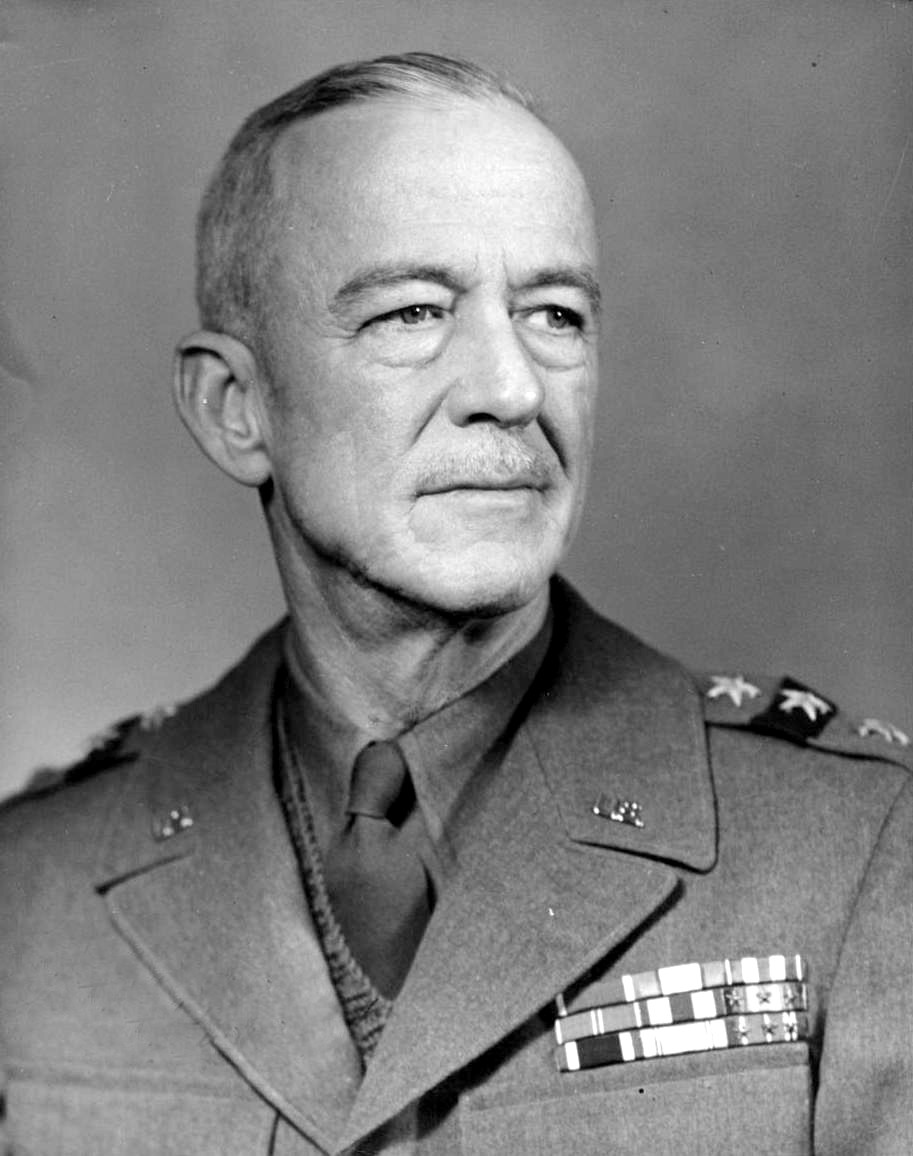
Lt. Gen. Courtney P. Hodges

Lieutenant General Omar N. Bradley

==== U.S. First Army ====
Lieutenant General Courtney H. Hodges

5th Belgian Fusilier Battalion
143rd and 413th AA Gun Battalions
526th Armored Infantry Battalion
99th Infantry Battalion (Norwegian-Americans)

===== V Corps =====
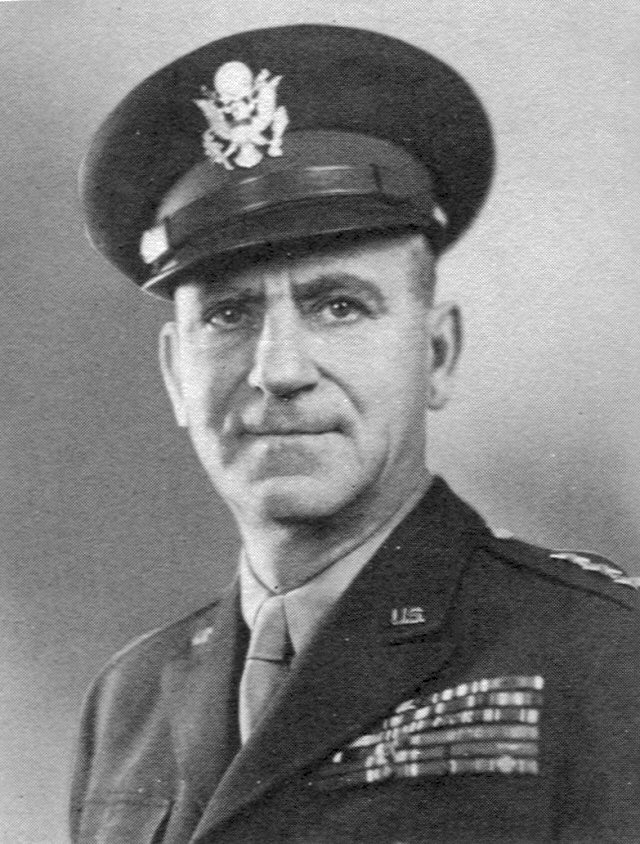
Leonard T. Gerow as a lieutenant general

Major General Leonard T. Gerow
♦ Units that absorbed the initial German assault 16 Dec

Corps-level units

56th Signal Battalion
102nd Cavalry Group, Mechanized♦

38th and 102nd Cavalry Recon Squadrons (attached)

613th TD Battalion
186th, 196th, 200th, and 955th FA Battalions
254th Engineer Combat Battalion
187th FA Group (751st and 997th FA Battalions)
190th FA Group (62nd, 190th, 272nd, and 268th FA Battalions)
406th FA Group (76th, 941st, 953rd, and 987th FA Battalions)
1111th Engineer Combat Group (51st, 202nd, 291st, and 296th Engineer Combat Battalions)
1121st Engineer Combat Group (146th, 254th Engineer Combat Battalions)
1195th Engineer Combat Group
134th, 387th, 445th, 460th, 461st, 531st, 602nd, 639th, and 863rd AAA AW Battalions

1st Infantry Division
Brigadier General Clift Andrus (Note: After the war, served as commandant of the former Palace Hotel (called "Camp Ashcan") in the Luxembourg town of Mondorf-les-Bains where high-level German prisoners were kept in the months leading up the Nuremberg Trials.)

16th, 18th and 26th Infantry Regiments
5th, 7th, 32nd, and 33rd FA Battalions
1st Engineer Combat Battalion
745th Tank Battalion
634th and 703rd TD Battalions
103rd AAA AW Battalion

2nd Infantry Division
Major General Walter M. Robertson

9th♦, 23rd♦, and 38th♦ Infantry Regiments
12th, 15th, 37th, and 38th FA Battalions
2nd Engineer Combat Battalion
741st Tank Battalion
612th and 644th TD Battalions
462nd AAA AW Battalion

9th Infantry Division
Major General Louis A. Craig

39th, 47th, and 60th Infantry Regiments
26th, 34th, 60th, and 84th FA Battalions
15th Engineer Combat Battalion
38th Cavalry Recon Squadron
746th Tank Battalion
376th and 413th AAA AW Battalions

78th Infantry Division
Major General Edwin P. Parker Jr.

309th, 310th, and 311th Infantry Regiments
307th, 308th, 309th, and 903rd FA Battalions
303rd Engineer Combat Battalion
709th Tank Battalion
628th and 893rd TD Battalions
552nd AAA AW Battalion

CCR, 5th Armored Division (attached)
2nd Ranger Battalion (attached)

99th Infantry Division
Major General Walter E. Lauer

393rd♦, 394th♦, and 395th♦ Infantry Regiments
370th, 371st, 372nd, and 924th FA Battalions
324th Engineer Combat Battalion
801st TD Battalion
535th AAA AW Battalion

===== VII Corps =====
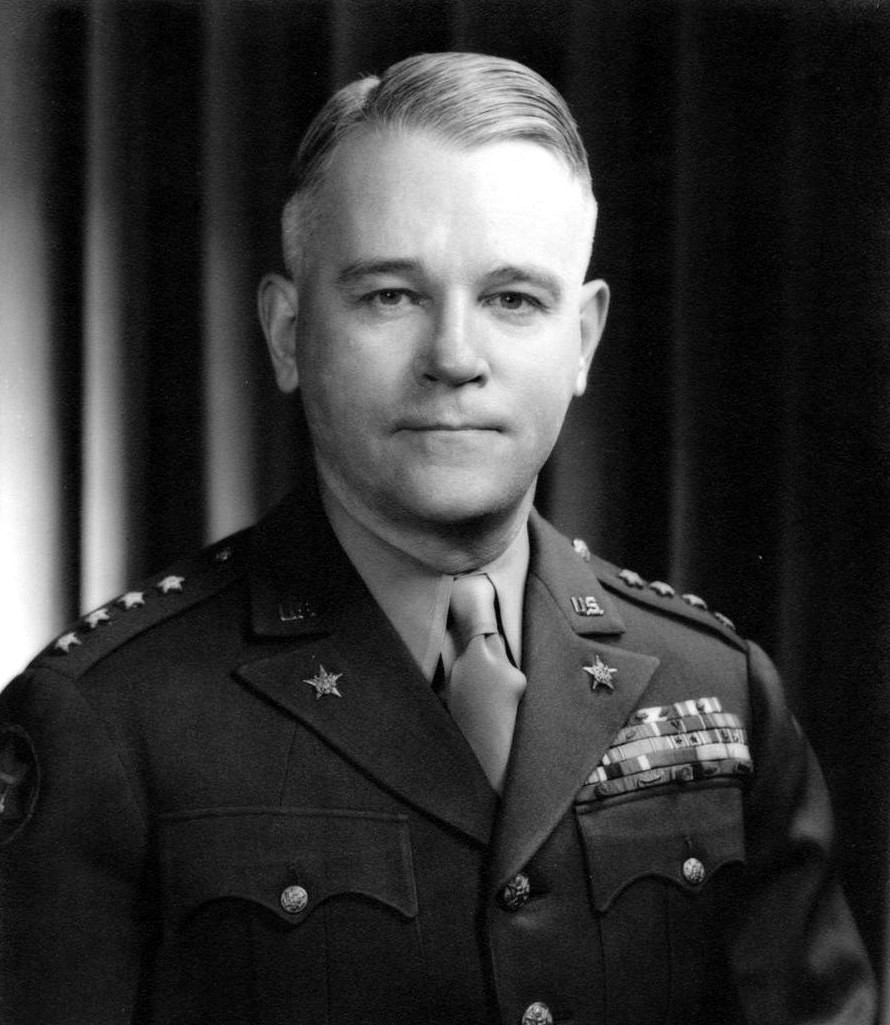
J. Lawton Collins as a full general

Major General J. Lawton Collins
♦ Units that absorbed the initial German assault 16 Dec

Corps-level units

4th Cavalry Group, Mechanized
29th Infantry Regiment
Two French Light Infantry Battalions
509th Parachute Infantry Battalion
298th Engineer Combat Battalion
740th Tank Battalion
18th FA Group (188th, 666th, and 981st FA Battalions)
142nd FA Group (195th and 266th FA Battalions)
188th FA Group (172nd, 951st, and 980th FA Battalions)
342nd, 366th, 392nd♦, 1308th, and 1313th Engineer General Service Regiments
18th, 83rd, 87th, 183rd, 193rd, 957th, and 991st FA Battalions

2nd Armored Division
Major General Ernest N. Harmon

41st Armored Infantry Regiment
66th and 67th Armored Regiments
14th, 78th, and 92nd Armored FA Battalions
17th Armored Engineer Battalion
82nd Armored Reconnaissance Battalion
702nd Tank Destroyer Battalion
195th AAA Automatic Weapons Battalion
142nd Armored Signal Company

3rd Armored Division
Major General Maurice Rose

36th Armored Infantry Regiment
32nd and 33rd Armored Regiments
54th, 67th, and 391st Armored FA Battalions
23rd Armored Engineer Battalion
83rd Armored Recon Squadron
643rd and 703rd TD Battalions
486th AAA Automatic Weapons Battalion
143rd Armored Signal Company

83rd Infantry Division
Major General Robert C. Macon

329th, 330th, and 331st Infantry Regiments
322nd, 323rd, 324th, and 908th FA Battalions
308th Engineer Combat Battalion
453rd AAA Automatic Weapons Battalion
774th Tank Battalion
772nd Tank Destroyer Battalion

84th Infantry Division
Brigadier General Alexander R. Bolling

333rd, 334th, and 335th Infantry Regiments
325th, 326th, 327th, and 909th FA Battalions
309th Engineer Combat Battalion
701st Tank Battalion, replaced by 771st Tank Battalion on 20 December
638th Tank Destroyer Battalion
557th AAA Automatic Weapons Battalion

===== XVIII Airborne Corps =====
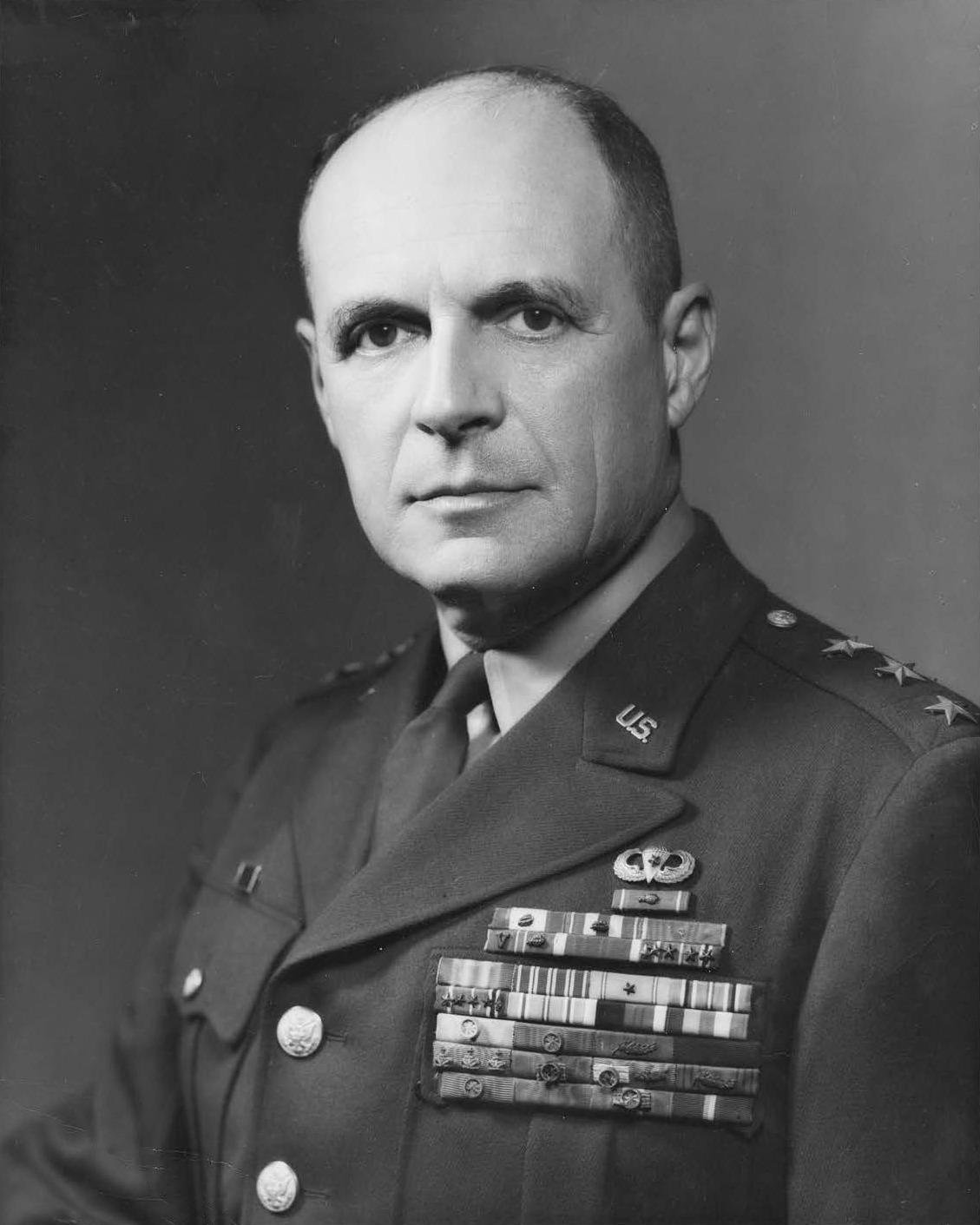
Maj. Gen. Matthew B. Ridgway as a lieutenant general

Major General Matthew B. Ridgway (Note: In England when the German assault began; during the Korean War, provided vigorous leadership to the US Eighth Army, followed by a term as Chief of Staff of the Army.)
♦ Units that absorbed the initial German assault 16 Dec

Corps-level units

14th Cavalry Group, Mechanized♦
254th, 275th, 400th, and 460th FA Battalions
79th FA Group (153rd, 551st, and 552nd FA Battalions)
179th FA Group (259th and 965th FA Battalions)
211th FA Group (240th and 264th FA Battalions)
401st FA Group (187th and 809th FA Battalions)

7th Armored Division
Brigadier General Robert W. Hasbrouck

23rd, 38th, and 48th Armored Infantry Battalions
17th, 31st, and 40th Tank Battalions
434th, 440th, and 489th Armored FA Battalions
33rd Armored Engineer Battalion
87th Cavalry Recon Squadron, Mech.
814th Tank Destroyer Battalion
820th Tank Destroyer Battalion (attached 25–30 December)
203rd AAA Automatic Weapons Battalion
147th Armored Signal Company

30th Infantry Division
Major General Leland S. Hobbs

117th, 119th, and 120th Infantry Regiments
113th, 118th, 197th, and 230th FA Battalions
105th Engineer Combat Battalion
743rd Tank Battalion
823rd Tank Destroyer Battalion
517th Parachute Infantry Regiment (attached)
110th, 431st and 448th AAA Automatic Weapons Battalions

75th Infantry Division
Major General Fay B. Prickett

289th, 290th, and 291st Infantry Regiments
730th, 897th, 898th, and 899th FA Battalions
275th Engineer Combat Battalion
750th Tank Battalion
629th and 772nd Tank Destroyer Battalions
440th AAA Automatic Weapons Battalion

82nd Airborne Division
Major General James M. Gavin

504th, 505th, 507th, and 508th Parachute Infantry Regiments
325th Glider Infantry Regiment
319th and 320th Glider FA Battalions
376th and 456th Parachute FA Battalions
307th Airborne Engineer Battalion
80th AAA Automatic Weapons Battalion
551st Parachute Infantry Battalion
740th Tank Battalion (attached 30 December – 11 January)
628th Tank Destroyer Battalion (attached 2–11 January)
643rd Tank Destroyer Battalion (attached 4–5 January)

106th Infantry Division
Major General Alan W. Jones

422nd♦, 423rd♦, (Note: Private Kurt Vonnegut, later a noted author, was captured while serving in this unit. [Beevor, p. 186]) and 424th♦ Infantry Regiments
589th, 590th, 591st, and 592nd FA Battalions
81st Engineer Combat Battalion
820th Tank Destroyer Battalion
634th AAA Automatic Weapons Battalion (8–18 December)
440th AAA Automatic Weapons Battalion (8 December – 4 January)
563rd AAA Automatic Weapons Battalion (9–18 December)

101st Airborne Division
Brigadier General Anthony C. McAuliffe (acting) (Note: Regular CO Maj. Gen. Maxwell D. Taylor was in the United States and his deputy, Brig. Gen. Gerald J. Higgins, was in England; McAuliffe was the divisional artillery commander. [Beevor, p. 154])

501st, 502nd, and 506th Parachute Infantry Regiments
327th Glider Infantry Regiment
1st Battalion, 401st Glider Infantry
321st and 907th Glider FA Battalions
377th and 463rd Parachute FA Battalion
326th Parachute Engineer Battalion
705th Tank Destroyer Battalion
81st Airborne AAA Automatic Weapons Battalion

=== US Third Army ===
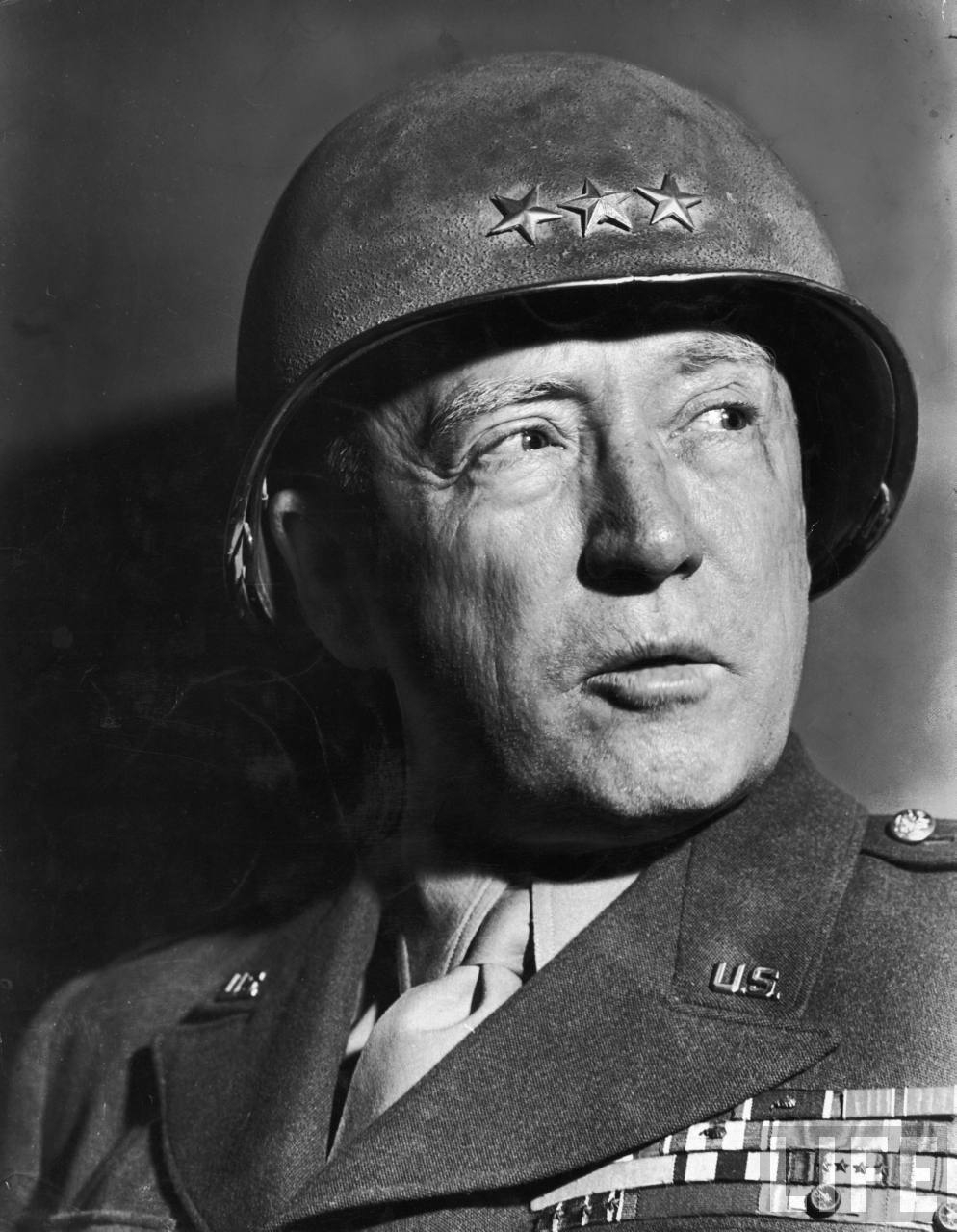
Lt. Gen. George S. Patton

Lieutenant General George S. Patton

109th, 115th, 217th, and 777th AA Gun Battalions
456th, 465th, 550th, and 565th AAA AW Battalions
280th ECB - Engineer Combat Battalion - Non Divisional Unit (later assigned to the 9th Army)

==== III Corps ====
Major General John Millikin

Corps-level units

6th Cavalry Group, Mechanized
179th, 274th, 776th, and 777th FA Battalions
193rd FA Group (177th, 253rd, 696th, 776th, and 949th FA Battalions)
203rd FA Group (278th, 742nd, 762nd FA Battalions)
183rd and 243rd Engineer Combat Battalions
1137th Engineer Combat Group (145th, 188th, and 249th Engineer Combat Battalions)
467th and 468th AAA Automatic Weapons Battalions

4th Armored Division
Major General Hugh J. Gaffey

8th, 35th, and 37th Tank Battalions (Note: The 37th Tank Bttn. was commanded by Lt. Col. Creighton W. Abrams, future commander of all US forces in Vietnam and future Chief of Staff of the United States Army. [Beevor, p. 268])
10th, 51st, and 53rd Armored Infantry Battalions
22nd, 66th, and 94th Armored FA Battalions
24th Armored Engineer Battalion
25th Cavalry Recon Squadron, Mech.
704th Tank Destroyer Battalion
489th AAA Automatic Weapons Battalion
144th Armored Signal Company

6th Armored Division
Major General Robert W. Grow

15th, 68th, and 69th Tank Battalions
9th, 44th, and 50th Armored Infantry Battalions
128th, 212th, and 231st Armored FA Battalions
86th Cavalry Recon Squadron, Mech.
25th Armored Engineer Battalion
691st Tank Destroyer Battalion
777th AAA Automatic Weapons Battalion
145th Armored Signal Company

26th Infantry Division
Major General Willard S. Paul

101st, 104th, and 328th Infantry Regiments
101st, 102nd, 180th, and 263rd FA Battalions
101st Engineer Combat Battalion
735th Tank Battalion
818th Tank Destroyer Battalion
390th AAA Automatic Weapons Battalion

35th Infantry Division
Major General Paul W. Baade

134th, 137th, and 320th Infantry Regiments
127th, 161st, 216th, and 219th FA Battalions
60th Engineer Combat Battalion
654th Tank Destroyer Battalion
448th AAA Automatic Weapons Battalion

90th Infantry Division
Major General James A. Van Fleet

357th, 358th, and 359th Infantry Regiments
343rd, 344th, 345th, and 915th FA Battalions
315th Engineer Combat Battalion
773rd Tank Destroyer Battalion
774th Tank Destroyer Battalion (attached 21 December – 6 January)
537th AAA Automatic Weapons Battalion

==== VIII Corps ====
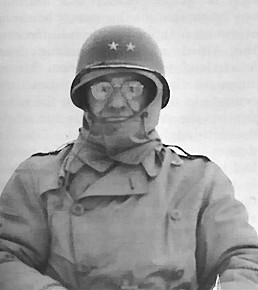
Maj. Gen. Troy H. Middleton during the Ardennes Counteroffensive

Major General Troy H. Middleton
♦ Units that absorbed the initial German assault 16 Dec

Corps-level units

687th FA Battalion
174th FA Group (965th, 969th, and 700th FA Battalions)
333rd FA Group (333rd and 771st FA Battalions)
402nd FA Group (559th, 561st, and 740th FA Battalions)
422nd FA Group (81st and 174th FA Battalions)
178th and 249th Engineer Combat Battalions
1102nd Engineer Group (341st Engineer General Service Regiment)
1107th Engineer Combat Group (159th, 168th, and 202nd Engineer Combat Battalions)
1128th Engineer Combat Group (35th, 44th, and 202nd Engineer Combat Battalions)
French Light Infantry (six Light Infantry Battalions from Metz region)
467th, 635th, 778th AAA Automatic Weapons Battalions

9th Armored Division
Major General John W. Leonard

2nd, 14th, and 19th Tank Battalions
27th, 52nd, and 60th Armored Infantry Battalions
3rd, 16th, and 73rd Armored FA Battalions
9th Armored Engineer Battalion
89th Cavalry Recon. Squadron, Mech.
9th Armored Engineer Battalion
482nd AAA Automatic Weapons Battalion (detached 9 January 1945)
149th Armored Signal Company

11th Armored Division
Brigadier General Charles S. Kilburn

22nd, 41st, and 42nd Tank Battalions
21st, 55th, and 63rd Armored Infantry Battalions
490th, 491st, and 492nd Armored FA Battalions
56th Armored Engineer Battalion
41st Cavalry Recon. Squadron, Mech.
602nd Tank Destroyer Battalion
575th AAA Automatic Weapons Battalion
151st Armored Signal Company

17th Airborne Division
Major General William M. Miley

507th and 513th Parachute Infantry Regiments
193rd and 194th Glider Infantry Regiments
680th and 681st Glider FA Battalions
466th Parachute FA Battalion
139th Airborne Engineer Battalion
155th Airborne AAA Automatic Weapons Battalion

28th Infantry Division
Major General Norman D. Cota

109th♦, 110th♦, and 112th♦ Infantry Regiments
107th, 108th, 109th, and 229th FA Battalions
103rd Engineer Combat Battalion
707th Tank Battalion
602nd Tank Destroyer Battalion
630th Tank Destroyer Battalion
447th AAA Automatic Weapons Battalion

87th Infantry Division
Brigadier General Frank L. Culin Jr.

345th, 346th, and 347th Infantry Regiments
334th, 335th, 336th, 912th FA Battalions
312th Engineer Combat Battalion
761st Tank Battalion
549th AAA Automatic Weapons Battalion
610th Tank Destroyer Battalion (14–22 December)
691st Tank Destroyer Battalion (22–24 December and 8–26 January)
704th Tank Destroyer Battalion (17–19 December)

==== XII Corps ====
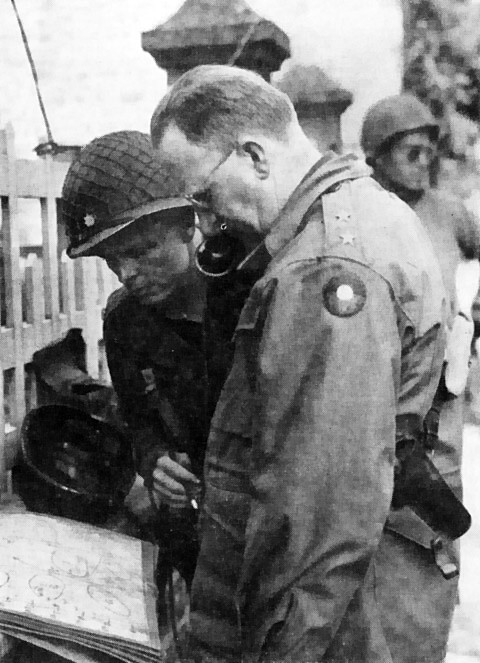
Maj. Gen. Manton S. Eddy

Major General Manton S. Eddy
♦ Units that absorbed the initial German assault 16 Dec

Corps-level units

2nd Cavalry Group, Mechanized
161st, 244th, 277th, 334th, 336th, and 736th FA Battalions
177th FA group 215th, 255th, and 775th FA Battalions
182nd FA group 802nd, 945th, and 974th FA Battalions
183rd FA group 695th and 776th FA Battalions
404th FA group 273rd, 512th, and 752nd FA Battalions
1303rd Engineer Service Regiment
452nd AAA Automatic Weapons Battalion [colored]
457th AAA Automatic Weapons Battalion
372nd Engineer General Service Regiment

4th Infantry Division
Major General Raymond O. Barton

8th♦, 12th♦, and 22nd Infantry Regiments
20th, 29th, 42nd, and 44th FA Battalions
4th Engineer Combat Battalion
70th Tank Battalion
802nd and 803rd Tank Destroyer Battalions
377th AAA Automatic Weapons Battalions

5th Infantry Division
Major General Stafford L. Irwin

2nd, 10th, and 11th Infantry Regiments
19th, 21st, 46th, and 50th FA Battalions
7th Engineer Combat Battalion
737th Tank Battalion
654th Tank Destroyer Battalion (22–25 December)
803rd Tank Destroyer Battalion (from 25 December)
807th Tank Destroyer Battalion (17–21 December)
818th Tank Destroyer Battalion (13 July – 20 December)
449th AAA Automatic Weapons Battalion

10th Armored Division
Major General William H. H. Morris Jr.

3rd, 11th, and 21st Tank Battalions
20th, 54th, and 61st Armored Infantry Battalions
419th, 420th, and 423rd Armored FA Battalions
609th Tank Destroyer Battalion
55th Armored Engineer Battalion
90th Cavalry Recon Squadron, Mech.
796th AAA Automatic Weapons Battalion
150th Armored Signal Company

80th Infantry Division
Major General Horace L. McBride

317th, 318th, and 319th Infantry Regiments
313th, 314th, 315th, and 905th FA Battalions
305th Engineer Combat Battalion
702nd Tank Battalion
610th Tank Destroyer Battalion (23 November – 6 December and 21 December – 28 January)
808th Tank Destroyer Battalion (25 September – 21 December)
633rd AAA Automatic Weapons Battalion

=== Allied Air Forces ===
==== US Strategic Air Forces in Europe ====
General Carl Spaatz

US Eighth Air Force (Strategic)
Lieutenant General James H. Doolittle
US Ninth Air Force (Tactical)
Lieutenant General Hoyt S. Vandenberg

IX Bombardment Division (Maj. Gen. Samuel E. Anderson)
IX Troop Carrier Command (Maj. Gen. Paul L. Williams)
IX Tactical Air Command (Maj. Gen. Elwood R. Quesada)

Supporting First Army

XIX Tactical Air Command (Maj. Gen. Otto P. Weyland)

Supporting Third Army

XXIX Tactical Air Command (Brig. Gen. Richard E. Nugent)

Supporting Ninth Army

==== Royal Air Force ====
Bomber Command

Air Chief Marshal Sir Arthur "Bomber" Harris

Fighter Command

Air Marshal Sir Roderic M. Hill

Second Tactical Air Force

Air Marshal Sir Arthur Coningham

No. 2 Group RAF
No. 83 Group RAF
No. 84 Group RAF
