= Hartung =

Hartung is a surname. Notable people with the surname include:

- Billy Hartung (actor) (b. 1971), American actor and dancer
- Clint Hartung (1922–2010), former Major League Baseball player
- Edgar Hartung (born 1956), West German sprint canoer
- Eugen Hartung (1897–1973), Swiss painter
- Frederick Hartung (1857–?), Member of the Wisconsin State Assembly
- Fritz Hartung (1883–1967), political and constitutional historian of Germany
- Georg Hartung (1821–1891), German geologist
- Hans Hartung (1904–1989), German-French abstract painter
- Horst von Pflugk-Harttung (1889–1967), German intelligence officer and spy for Nazi Germany
- Jim Hartung (1960–2026), American gymnast, Olympic champion
- John Hartung (b. 1947), Associate Professor of Anesthesiology at the State University of New York
- Kaylee Hartung (b. 1985), American television journalist
- Max Hartung (b. 1989), German fencer
- Otto Schmidt-Hartung (1892-1976), German general
- Paul J. Hartung (b. 1961), Professor of behavioral sciences, Northeast Ohio Medical University
- Thomas Hartung (1970-2024), German politician (SPD;The Left)
- Valery Hartung (b. 1960), Russian politician
- Wilfried Hartung (b. 1953), German swimmer
- Willi Hartung (1915–1987), Swiss painter.
- William D. Hartung (b. 1955), director of the Arms Trade Resource Center at the World Policy Institute
