= United States Engineer Regiments in World War II =

This is a list of known United States Engineer Regiments in existence at the time of World War II.

== Regiments in existence prior to World War II ==
Designation, configuration, and higher headquarters assignment are the most recent ones prior to U.S. entry into World War II

- 1st Engineer Regiment (1st Division - 1st Battalion redesignated 1st Engineer Battalion (Combat) on 12 October 1939 and regiment disbanded on 16 October 1939
- 2nd Engineer Regiment (2nd Division - 1st Battalion redesignated 2nd Engineer Battalion (Combat) on 12 October 1939 and regiment disbanded on 16 October 1939
- 3rd Engineer Regiment (Hawaiian Division - Regiment reorganized and redesignated 3rd Engineer Battalion (Combat) on 26 September 1941 and assigned to the 24th Infantry Division
- 4th Engineer Regiment (4th Division - Regiment reorganized and redesignated 4th Engineer Battalion (Combat) on 19 October 1939
- 5th Engineer Regiment (II Corps)
- 6th Engineer Regiment (3rd Division) - 1st Battalion redesignated 6th Engineer Battalion (Combat) 12 October 1939, 2nd Battalion redesignated 10th Engineer Battalion (Combat) 13 October 1939 and relieved from the 3rd Division, and remainder of regiment disbanded
- 7th Engineer Regiment (5th Division) - Regiment reorganized and redesignated as the 7th Engineer Battalion (Combat) 16 October 1939
- 10th Engineer Regiment (8th Division) - Disbanded 14 October 1939
- 11th Engineer Regiment (Panama Canal Division)
- 14th Engineer Regiment (PS) (Philippine Division)
- 15th Engineer Regiment (9th Division - Regiment reorganized and redesignated 1 July 1940 as the 15th Engineer Battalion (Combat)
- 16th Engineer Regiment (1st Armored Division) - Withdrawn from the Panama Canal Department 15 July 1940. Concurrently, reorganized and redesignated as the 16th Engineer Battalion (Armored), assigned to the 1st Armored Division, and activated at Fort Knox, Kentucky, from personnel and assets of the 47th Engineer Troop (Mechanized).
- 18th Engineer Regiment (IX Corps)
- 19th Engineer Regiment (III Corps)
- 20th Engineer Regiment (IV Corps)
- 21st Engineer Regiment (General Headquarters Air Force) - Redesignated 4 June 1940 as the 21st Engineer Regiment (Aviation), relieved from the IV Corps, and assigned to the General Headquarters Air Force.
- 22nd Engineer Regiment (General Service) (III Corps) - Redesignated 22nd Engineer Battalion (Armored) 28 August 1941 and assigned to the 5th Armored Division
- 23rd Engineer Regiment (General Service) (VIII Corps) - Redesignated 23rd Engineer Battalion (Armored) 28 August 1941 and assigned to the 3rd Armored Division
- 24th Engineer Regiment (General Service) (VI Corps) - Redesignated as the 24th Engineer Battalion (Armored) 16 December 1940 and assigned to the 4th Armored Division
- 25th Engineer Regiment (General Service) (VII Corps) - Redesignated as the 25th Engineer Battalion (Armored) 28 August 1941 and assigned to the 6th Armored Division
- 26th Engineer Regiment (General Service) (IX Corps) - Inactive; disbanded 22 December 1942
- 34th Engineer Regiment (Combat) (General Headquarters Reserve)
- 35th Engineer Regiment (Combat) (First Army)
- 36th Engineer Regiment (Combat) (First Army)
- 37th Engineer Regiment (Combat) (VIII Corps)
- 38th Engineer Regiment (Combat) (I Corps)
- 39th Engineer Regiment (Combat) (Second Army) - Redesignated 19th Engineer Regiment (Combat) 1 July 1940
- 41st Engineer General Service Regiment (Colored) (First Army) - to Liberia as part of U.S. Army Forces in Liberia under United States Army Forces in the Middle East.
- 42nd Engineer General Service Regiment (Third Army) - Redesignated 20th Engineer Regiment (Combat) 1 July 1940
- 43rd Engineer General Service Regiment (Second Army)
- 44th Engineer General Service Regiment (First Army)
- 45th Engineer General Service Regiment (Colored) (Third Army)
- 46th Engineer General Service Regiment (Third Army)
- 47th Engineer General Service Regiment (Fourth Army)
- 78th Engineer Regiment (Combat)
- 101st Engineer Regiment (Combat) - 26th Division
- 102nd Engineer Regiment (Combat) - 27th Division
- 103rd Engineer Regiment (Combat) - 28th Division
- 104th Engineer Regiment (Combat) - 44th Division
- 105th Engineer Regiment (Combat) - 30th Division
- 106th Engineer Regiment (Combat) - 31st Division
- 107th Engineer Regiment (Combat) - 32nd Division
- 108th Engineer Regiment (Combat) - 33rd Division
- 109th Engineer Regiment (Combat) - 34th Division
- 110th Engineer Regiment (Combat) - 35th Division
- 111th Engineer Regiment (Combat) - 36th Division
- 112th Engineer Regiment (Combat) - 37th Division
- 113th Engineer Regiment (Combat) - 38th Division
- 115th Engineer Regiment (Combat) - 40th Division)
- 116th Engineer Regiment (Combat) - 41st Division
- 118th Engineer Regiment (Combat) - 43rd Division
- 120th Engineer Regiment (Combat) - 45th Division
- 121st Engineer Regiment (Combat) - 29th Division

== Regiments formed during wartime ==
- 44th Engineer Regiment (Combat)
- 45th Engineer General Service Regiment (Colored)
- 48th Engineer Regiment (Combat)
- 49th Engineer Regiment (Combat)
- 50th Engineer Regiment (Combat)
- 51st Engineer Regiment (Combat)
- 52nd Engineer Regiment (Combat)
- 79th Engineer Regiment (Combat)
- 82nd Engineer Regiment (Combat)
- 91st Engineer General Service Regiment (Colored)
- 92nd Engineer General Service Regiment (Colored)
- 93rd Engineer General Service Regiment (Colored)
- 94th Engineer General Service Regiment (Colored)
- 95th Engineer General Service Regiment (Colored)
- 96th Engineer General Service Regiment (Colored)
- 97th Engineer General Service Regiment (Colored)
- 98th Engineer General Service Regiment (Colored)
- 130th Engineer Regiment (Combat)
- 131st Engineer Regiment (Combat)
- 132nd Engineer Regiment (Combat)
- 133rd Engineer Regiment (Combat)
- 134th Engineer Regiment (Combat)
- 135th Engineer Regiment (Combat)
- 146th Engineer Regiment (Combat)
- 147th Engineer Regiment (Combat)
- 151st Engineer Regiment (Combat)
- 152nd Engineer Regiment (Combat)
- 175th Engineer General Service Regiment
- 176th Engineer General Service Regiment
- 177th Engineer General Service Regiment
- 224th Engineer General Service Regiment (Colored)
- 226th Engineer General Service Regiment (Colored)
- 330th Engineer General Service Regiment
- 332nd Engineer General Service Regiment
- 333rd Engineer Special Service Regiment
- 334th Engineer Special Service Regiment
- 337th Engineer General Service Regiment
- 338th Engineer General Service Regiment
- 340th Engineer General Service Regiment
- 341st Engineer General Service Regiment
- 342nd Engineer General Service Regiment
- 343rd Engineer General Service Regiment
- 344th Engineer General Service Regiment
- 345th Engineer General Service Regiment
- 346th Engineer General Service Regiment
- 348th Engineer General Service Regiment
- 349th Engineer General Service Regiment
- 350th Engineer General Service Regiment (Colored)
- 351st Engineer General Service Regiment
- 352nd Engineer General Service Regiment (Colored)
- 354th Engineer General Service Regiment (Colored)
- 355th Engineer General Service Regiment
- 356th Engineer General Service Regiment (Colored)
- 357th Engineer General Service Regiment
- 358th Engineer General Service Regiment
- 359th Engineer General Service Regiment
- 360th Engineer General Service Regiment
- 361st Engineer Special Service Regiment
- 362nd Engineer General Service Regiment (Colored)
- 363rd Engineer Special Service Regiment
- 364th Engineer General Service Regiment (Colored)
- 365th Engineer General Service Regiment (Colored)
- 366th Engineer General Service Regiment (Colored)
- 367th Engineer Special Service Regiment
- 368th Engineer General Service Regiment
- 369th Engineer Special Service Regiment
- 370th Engineer Special Service Regiment
- 371st Engineer General Service Regiment
- 372nd Engineer General Service Regiment
- 373rd Engineer General Service Regiment
- 374th Engineer General Service Regiment (Colored)
- 375th Engineer General Service Regiment (Colored)
- 377th Engineer General Service Regiment (Colored)
- 388th Engineer General Service Regiment (Colored)
- 389th Engineer General Service Regiment (Colored)
- 390th Engineer General Service Regiment (Colored)
- 392nd Engineer General Service Regiment (Colored)
- 393rd Engineer Special Service Regiment (Colored)
- 398th Engineer General Service Regiment (Colored)
- 531st Engineer Shore Regiment
- 532nd Engineer Boat and Shore Regiment
- 533rd Engineer Boat and Shore Regiment
- 534th Engineer Boat and Shore Regiment
- 540th Engineer Shore Regiment
- 542nd Engineer Boat and Shore Regiment
- 543rd Engineer Boat and Shore Regiment
- 544th Engineer Boat and Shore Regiment
- 591st Engineer Boat Regiment
- 592nd Engineer Boat and Shore Regiment
- 593rd Engineer Boat and Shore Regiment
- 594th Engineer Boat and Shore Regiment
- 689th Engineer Base Equipment Company
- 922nd Engineer Aviation Regiment
- 923rd Engineer Aviation Regiment (Colored)
- 924th Engineer Aviation Regiment
- 925th Engineer Aviation Regiment
- 926th Engineer Aviation Regiment
- 929th Engineer Aviation Regiment
- 930th Engineer Aviation Regiment
- 931st Engineer Aviation Regiment
- 932nd Engineer Aviation Regiment
- 1303rd Engineer General Service Regiment
- 1306th Engineer General Service Regiment
- 1307th Engineer General Service Regiment
- 1310th Engineer General Service Regiment (Colored)
- 1311th Engineer General Service Regiment (Colored)
- 1312th Engineer General Service Regiment (Colored)
- 1313th Engineer General Service Regiment (Colored)
- 1314th Engineer General Service Regiment (Colored)
- 1315th Engineer General Service Regiment (Colored)
- 1316th Engineer General Service Regiment (Colored)
- 1317th Engineer General Service Regiment (Colored)
- 1318th Engineer General Service Regiment (Colored)
- 1319th Engineer General Service Regiment (Colored)
- 1320th Engineer General Service Regiment (Colored)
- 1321st Engineer General Service Regiment (Colored)
- 1322nd Engineer General Service Regiment (Colored)
- 1323rd Engineer General Service Regiment (Colored)
- 1324th Engineer General Service Regiment (Colored)
- 1325th Engineer General Service Regiment (Colored)
- 1326th Engineer General Service Regiment (Colored)
- 1327th Engineer General Service Regiment (Colored)
- 1329th Engineer General Service Regiment (Colored)
- 1330th Engineer General Service Regiment (Colored)
- 1331st Engineer General Service Regiment (Colored)
- 1332nd Engineer General Service Regiment (Colored)
- 1333rd Engineer General Service Regiment (Colored)
- 1334th Engineer General Service Regiment (Colored)
- 1349th Engineer General Service Regiment (Colored)
- 1749th Engineer General Service Regiment (Colored)
- 2201st Engineer Aviation Regiment
- 2822nd Engineer General Service Regiment (Colored)
