= William Hartung =

William or Billy Hartung may refer to:

- William D. Hartung (born 1955), American military expert
- Billy Hartung (actor) (born 1971), American actor and dancer
- Billy Hartung (footballer) (born 1995), Australian rules footballer

== See also ==
- Willi Hartung (1915–1987), Swiss painter
- Wilfried Hartung (born 1953), German swimmer
