= General Schmidt =

General Schmidt may refer to:

- Arthur Schmidt (general) (1895–1987), German Wehrmacht lieutenant general
- August Schmidt (Luftwaffe) (1883–1955), German Luftwaffe general of artillery
- August Schmidt (Wehrmacht) (1892–1972), German Wehrmacht lieutenant general
- Erich-Otto Schmidt (1899–1959), German Wehrmacht major general
- Gustav Schmidt (general) (1894–1943), German Wehrmacht lieutenant general
- Hans Schmidt (general of the Infantry) (1877–1948), German Wehrmacht general of infantry
- Hans Schmidt (general, born 1895) (1895–1971), German Wehrmacht lieutenant general
- Harry Schmidt (USMC) (1886–1968), U.S. Marine Corps four-star general
- Karl von Schmidt (1817–1875), Prussian cavalry general
- Kurt Schmidt (1891–1945), German Wehrmacht lieutenant general
- Michael J. Schmidt (fl. 1990s–2020s), U.S. Air Force major general
- Randall Schmidt (fl. 1970s–2000s), U.S. Air Force lieutenant general
- Rudolf Schmidt (1886–1957), German Wehrmacht colonel general
- William R. Schmidt (1889–1966), U.S. Army major general

== See also ==
- Dmitry Shmidt (1896–1937), Soviet Army komdiv (equivalent to lieutenant general)
- Herman Alfred Schmid (1910–1985), U.S. Air Force brigadier general
- Josef Schmid (flight surgeon) (born 1965), U.S. Air Force Reserves major general
- Joseph Schmid (1901–1956), German Luftwaffe lieutenant general
- Otto Schmidt-Hartung (1892–1976), German Wehrmacht lieutenant general
- Werner Schmidt-Hammer (1894–1962), German Wehrmacht lieutenant general
- Attorney General Schmidt (disambiguation)
