= Camp Shanks =

WWII U.S. Army camp in Rockland County, NY

Coordinates: 41°02′10″N 73°57′30″W

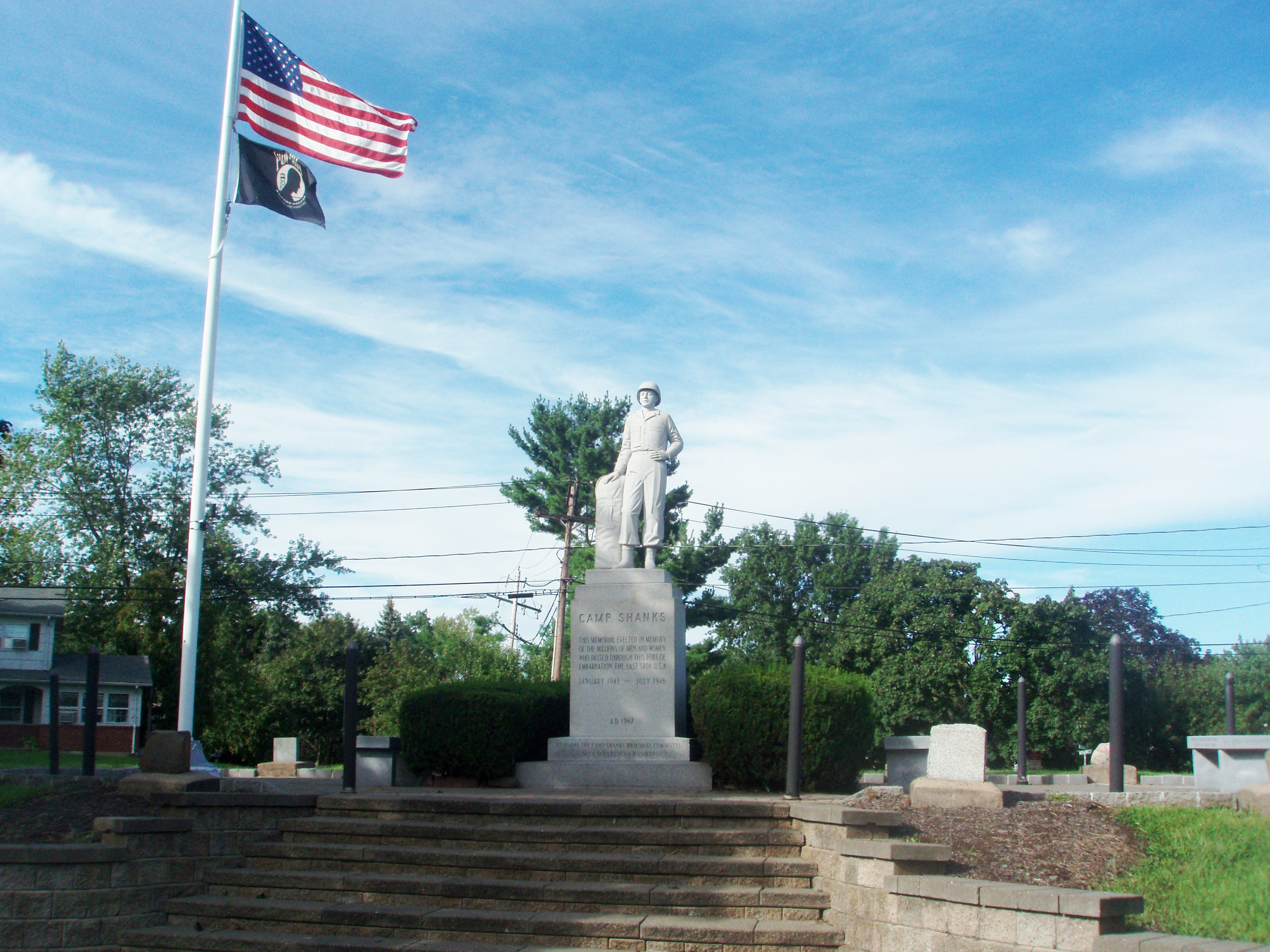
Camp Shanks Memorial in Orangeburg, New York

Camp Shanks was a United States Army installation in the Orangeburg, New York area. Named after Major General David C. Shanks, it was situated near the juncture of the Erie Railroad and the Hudson River. The camp was the largest U.S. Army embarkation camp used during World War II.

== History ==
Camp Shanks served as a staging area for troops departing the New York Port of Embarkation for overseas service during World War II. Dubbed “Last Stop USA”, the camp housed about 50,000 troops spread over 2,040 acres (8.3 km^{2}) and was the largest World War II U.S. Army embarkation camp, processing 1.3 million service personnel, including 75% of those participating in the D-Day invasion. In 1945, Camp Shanks also housed German and Italian prisoners of war.

After the war, old barracks buildings at Camp Shanks were converted into housing for veterans with families attending colleges and universities in the New York City area under the GI Bill; the settlement, then known as Shanks Village, closed in 1954, and the land Camp Shanks once stood on was returned to civilian control. Today, the expanded Palisades Interstate Parkway passes through some of the land that was once Camp Shanks.

In June 1994, the Camp Shanks Museum opened near the site, at the intersection of New York State Routes 303 and 340.

== Construction ==
On the evening of September 25, 1942, over 300 Orangeburg residents met at the Orangeburg School (now the city library) to learn that their homes, lots, and farms (amounting to approximately 2,040 acres (8.3 km^{2}) west of the museum) were being seized for the immediate construction of a military camp. One hundred thirty families lost their homes. If the United States was to transport troops and equipment to Europe, it had to expand its military facilities around New York City. Colonel Drew C. Eberson, U.S. Army Corps of Engineers, was the Chief Engineer during construction.

Camp Shanks was a rush job, completed between September 1942 and May 1943 at a cost of $44,391,335. Charges of corruption, petty theft, and disorderly behavior by workmen plagued the project. In June 1946, a federal grand jury cleared the military and the contractors of charges of graft, but acknowledged major problems among some of the labor unions, primarily consisting of a gigantic kickback system. Camp Shanks officially opened January 4, 1943, under the command of Colonel Kenna G. Eastman. The barracks in which the transient soldiers lived measured 20 feet by 100 feet and consisted of two rows of bunks and three coal-burning pot-belly stoves which provided the limited heat. Two Women's Army Corps (WAC) detachments, consisting of over 400 women, were assigned to the camp, and filled positions ranging from clerk to mechanic to warehouse staff to armorer. Their freedom of movement on the installation was restricted.

== Active years ==
Camp Shanks comprised one of three staging areas on the eastern seaboard. The other two, Fort Hamilton in Brooklyn, and Camp Kilmer in New Brunswick, NJ, when combined with Camp Shanks, made the area the largest staging area in the world. One of the primary functions as a staging area was to ensure each soldier and WAC left the U.S. fully equipped before crossing the Atlantic. The final field inspection at Camp Shanks identified any problems, made any necessary repairs, and replaced anything which could not be repaired. At the beginning of the war, no large depots existed in England from which soldiers could get their equipment. They carried their essentials with them in their backpacks or barracks bags.

During the second half of 1944, Camp Shanks was sending tens of thousands of troops overseas. Staging peaked in October 1944, when 78,354 troops arrived while 85,805 troops departed. By the end of November 44, all staging areas in the U.S. stopped their final field inspections. Shortages and replacements could be handled from supply depots in England. When the soldiers were notified that they were on "Alert" status, they knew they would be shipping out within twelve hours. The soldiers removed their division sleeve patches, and their helmets were chalked with a letter and a number, indicating the proper marching order from the camp to the train and the railroad car to ride in. It was a short train ride to the New Jersey docks, and a harbor boat ferried troops to a waiting troopship. One source also advised that troops marched the four miles (6 km) from the camp to the Piermont Pier where they boarded troopships.

== Prisoner of war camp ==
Camp Shanks also housed 1,200 Italian and 800 German prisoners of war between April 1945 and January 1946, with the first Germans arriving in June 1945. At the close of the war, 290,000 POWs passed through Camp Shanks as they were processed for return to their native countries. The last German to leave was on 22 July 1946, and the camp closed that month. Some of the buildings were converted to housing for veterans returning to school and the former camp was renamed Shanks Village.

== Units passing through Camp Shanks ==
(Partial Listing)

=== Ground Forces ===
- 2d Infantry Division
- 7th Armored Division
- 6th Armored Division
- 6th Cavalry Group
- 10th Armored Division
- 12th Armored Division
- 15th Cavalry Group
- 16th Armored Division
- 32d Signal Construction Battalion
- 48th Infantry Regiment
- 50th Armored Infantry Battalion
- 56th Antiaircraft Artillery Brigade
- 63rd Infantry Division
- 65th Infantry Division
- 75th Infantry Division
- 83rd Infantry Division
- 61st Surgical Hospital
- 94th Infantry Division
- 103d Infantry Division
- 106th Infantry Division
- 106th Cavalry Group
- 108th Antiaircraft Artillery Group
- 208th Engineer Combat Battalion
- 231st Station Hospital
- 248th Signal Operations Company
- 258th Engineer Combat Battalion
- 275th Armored Field Artillery Battalion
- 294th Field Artillery Observation Battalion
- 341st Engineer General Service Regiment
- 368th MED DET ENGR General Service Regiment
- 481st Anti-Aircraft Artillery (Automatic Weapons) Battalion
- 559th Anti-Aircraft Brigade
- 569th Field Artillery Battalion
- 757th Railway Shop Battalion
- 773rd Field Artillery Battalion
- 808th Tank Destroyer Battalion
- 4031 Quartermaster TRK
- Headquarters, Third United States Army
- 35th Engineer Combat Battalion

796th MP Bn

=== Army Air Forces ===
- 14th Fighter Squadron
- 58th Fighter Squadron
- 59th Fighter Squadron
- 60th Fighter Squadron
- 99th Fighter Squadron
- 371st Fighter Squadron
- 301st Signal Company
- 314th Fighter Squadron
- 315th Fighter Squadron
- 316th Fighter Squadron
- 441st Bombardment Squadron
- 442d Bombardment Squadron
- 443d Bombardment Squadron
- 444th Bombardment Squadron
- 509th Fighter Squadron
- 511th Fighter Squadron
- 523d Fighter Squadron
- 524th Fighter Squadron
- 27th Fighter Group
- 33d Fighter Group
- 36th Fighter Group
- 48th Fighter Group
- 324th Fighter Group
- 357th Fighter Group
- 367th Fighter Group
- 379th Bombardment Group
- 401st Bombardment Group
- 445th Bombardment Group
- 446th Bombardment Group
- 448th Bombardment Group
- 452d Bombardment Group
- 467th Bombardment Group
- 490th Bombardment Group
- 53d Troop Carrier Wing
- 71st Fighter Wing
- 97th Bombardment Group
- 390th Bombardment Group
- 42d Bombardment Wing
- IX Tactical Air Command

=== Other ===
- USCGC Eagle (WIX-327)
- 101st Airborne Division
- 6888th Central Postal Directory Battalion
