= 338th Regiment =

338th Regiment may refer to:

- 338th Engineer General Service Regiment, United States
- 338th Infantry Regiment, United States
