= Attorney General Schmidt =

Attorney General Schmidt may refer to:

- Derek Schmidt (born 1968), Attorney General of Kansas
- Grant Schmidt (born 1948), Attorney General of Saskatchewan

== See also ==
- Eric Schmitt (born 1975), Attorney General of Missouri
- General Schmidt (disambiguation)
