= 75th Cavalry Regiment =

1-75th Cavalry Regiment
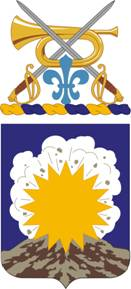
- Coat of Arms
- Active: 15 December 1941 – 20 June 2024
- Country: United States
- Allegiance: United States Army
- Branch: Cavalry
- Type: Reconnaissance, surveillance, and target acquisition
- Role: Cavalry Reconnaissance
- Size: Squadron
- Part of: 2nd Brigade, 101st Airborne Division
- Garrison/HQ: Fort Campbell
- Nicknames: Widowmakers; Strike CAV
- Motto: One round
- Equipment: M1151A1 HMMWV M1167 HMMWV
- Engagements: World War II; *Battle for Brest; *Battle of the Bulge; Operation Iraqi Freedom; Operation Enduring Freedom; Operation Inherent Resolve
- Website: Fort Campbell Units

Commanders
- Squadron Commander: LTC Gregory W. Greenlee
- Command Sergeant Major: CSM Russell W. Pace

Insignia
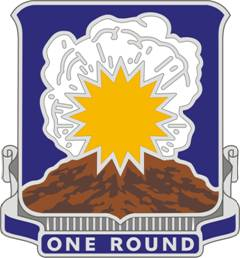
- Distinctive unit insignia

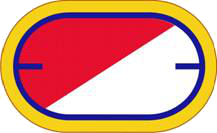
- Squadron Background Trimming

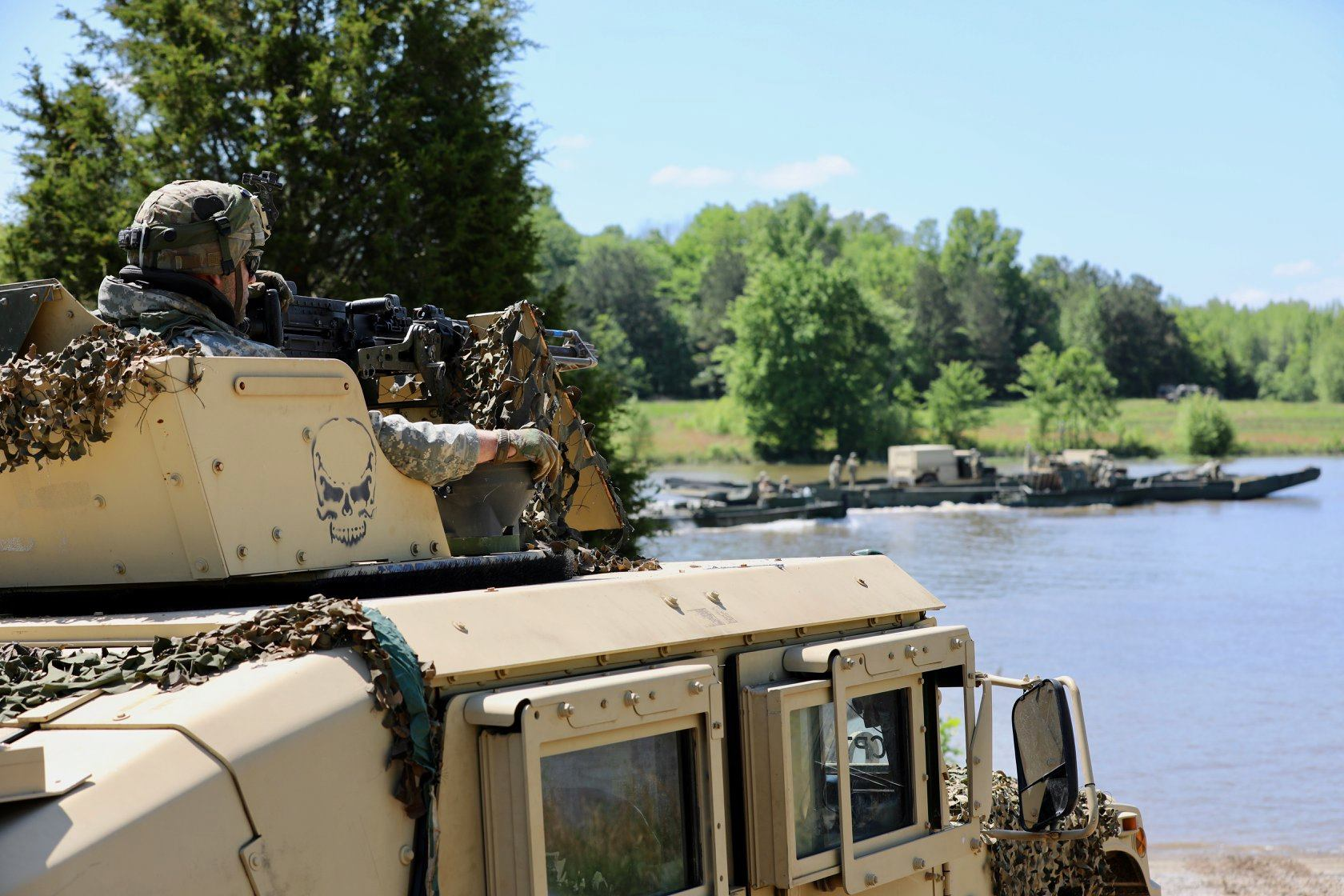
An M1151A1 HMMWV crew of 1-75 CAV provides security while a bridge is constructed across a water obstacle during the 2019 2nd Brigade Combat Team's brigade FTX.

The 1st Squadron, 75th Cavalry Regiment (1-75 CAV) is an inactive United States Army cavalry squadron established in 2004. It was the Reconnaissance, Surveillance and Target Acquisition Squadron (RSTA) squadron of the 2nd Brigade Combat Team "Strike" ♥, 101st Airborne Division (Air Assault). It performed reconnaissance and cavalry missions in support of that brigade.

== Activation ==
1st Squadron, 75th Cavalry ("Widowmakers"), an RSTA, was formed under the U.S. Army's transformation in September 2004. The squadron was formed under 2nd Infantry Brigade Combat Team "Strike", 101st Airborne Division in place of 3-502nd Infantry. The first commander of the squadron was LTC Alfonso J. Ahuja with CSM Scott C. Schroeder. The Squadron's lineage dates back to World War II, as the 705th Tank Destroyer Battalion which was attached to the 502nd Infantry Regiment. The motto of 1-75 CAV (Widowmakers) is ONE ROUND!

== Deployment and training ==
The 1-75 Cavalry deployed to Iraq in support of Operation Iraqi Freedom in the autumn of 2005. The squadron remained with 2BCT, 101st Airborne Division based out of Camp Striker. The squadron, along with the rest of 2BCT, patrolled Southwest Baghdad in an area known as the "triangle of death". 1-75 CAV is noted for locating and destroying multiple weapons caches as well as detaining several ranking members of Al-Qaeda in Iraq. In January 2006 the Squadron was moved to protect a deadly Main Supply Route (MSR) leading into Baghdad.

While controlling this supply route, the squadron successfully decreased improvised explosive device and small arms attacks by over 80%, thus enabling the safe transport of supplies and materials into central and northern Iraq. During the time spent on MSR security, the squadron suffered two casualties.

1-75 CAV returned to Iraq in support of Operation Iraqi Freedom in October 2007 and redeployed to Fort Campbell in late November 2008. 1-75 CAV deployed to Afghanistan in support of Operation Enduring Freedom in June 2010 and returned in April 2011. It deployed to Iraq as part of Task Force Strike in summer 2016 and returned the following year.

1-75 CAV partook in US Army AFRICOM's annual exercise African Lion in March 2019, with HHT, A and B Troops deploying to Morocco and C Troop deploying to Tunisia for the exercise, returning the following April.

1-75 CAV, along with the rest of the Strike Brigade and the 101st Airborne Division Headquarters, received orders to deploy to eastern Europe in support of Operation Assure, Deter and Reinforce in May 2022 to replace elements of 3rd Brigade, 82nd Airborne Division that deployed as the Immediate Response Force earlier that year in response to Russian aggression in Europe. 1-75 CAV was garrisoned in Rzeszow, Poland until redeploying with the rest of 2nd Brigade to Fort Campbell in March 2022, being replaced by 1st Brigade, 101st Airborne Division.

== Deactivation ==
In accordance with Army force structure goals, 1-75 CAV deactivated on June 20th, 2024. Charlie Troop deactivated several months before the rest of the squadron in March 2024, with its personnel being transferred to activate the 2BCT Multi-Functional Reconnaissance Company (MFRC).

== Organization ==
1-75 CAV was organized into 5 troops; a headquarters and headquarters troop; two mounted reconnaissance troops; and one dismounted reconnaissance troop. A forward support company from the 526th Brigade Support Battalion was attached to the squadron to provide logistical and maintenance support. The squadron was manned primarily by the 19 series MOS (Armor/Cavalry) enlisted men and officers. 11 series MOS (Infantry) enlisted men and officers man the mortar sections and dismounted recon troop.

Headquarters and Headquarters Troop ("Hellcat Troop"); the squadron's headquarters providing administrative support, intelligence, command and control, and medical support to the squadron.

Alpha Troop ("Apache Troop"); a mounted cavalry reconnaissance troop. It had three mounted recon platoons, a mortar section, and a headquarters section.

Bravo Troop ("Bone Troop"); a mounted cavalry reconnaissance troop. It had three mounted recon platoons, a mortar section, and a headquarters section.

Charlie Company ("Chaos Company"); a dismounted reconnaissance company. It had two dismounted recon platoons, a mortar section, a sniper section, and a headquarters section. C Company deactivated in March 2024.

Delta Company ("Dealer Troop"); an attached forward support company from the 526th Brigade Support Battalion (BSB).

== See also ==
- United States Army branch insignia
- List of armored and cavalry regiments of the United States Army
