= 705th Tank Destroyer Battalion =

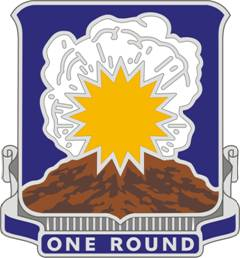
- Unit insignia
- Active: 1941–1945
- Disbanded: 1945
- Country: United States
- Allegiance: Army
- Part of: Independent unit
- Equipment: M18 Hellcat
- Engagements: World War II; *Battle for Brest; *Battle of the Bulge
- Decorations: Presidential Unit Citation

The 705th Tank Destroyer Battalion was a tank destroyer battalion of the United States Army active during the Second World War. It was originally formed from artillery elements of the 5th Armored Division, and its lineage is today perpetuated by the 75th Cavalry Regiment.

The battalion operated in northern France with Third Army in 1944, where it fought in Brittany at the capture of Brest, and then along the Moselle River, reaching Germany at the end of the year. During the Battle of the Bulge, it was engaged at the Siege of Bastogne along with the 101st Airborne Division, where it received the Presidential Unit Citation, and in the spring of 1945 it advanced through southern Germany with the 11th Armored Division, reaching Austria by the end of the war.

== Early service ==
The battalion was formed in December 1941, around a cadre taken from the 58th Armored Field Artillery Battalion, part of the 5th Armored Division. It trained in California and Texas, equipped with M3 GMCs, before moving to Oregon in early 1943 and receiving the new M10 tank destroyer. Whilst at the Tank Destroyer Center in Texas, they were described by General A. D. Bruce as "the finest" tank destroyer battalion yet trained.

The battalion transferred to New York, and then boarded the liner Queen Elizabeth on 18 April for the voyage to the United Kingdom. It arrived in Scotland on the 27th, and set up camp in southern England on 1 June.

== France ==
The battalion sailed for Normandy in July, and was landed at Utah Beach on the 18th, equipped with M18 Hellcat tank destroyers. After two weeks of being held in reserve, they were moved to the front line on the 31st and attached to a task force of Third Army which was assigned to capture the ports along the north coast of Brittany; it pushed through Avranches and turned westwards towards Brest; from 6 to 16 August B Company was attached to the 83rd Infantry Division. On 17 August, the battalion liberated the town of Paimpol, on the north coast of Brittany.

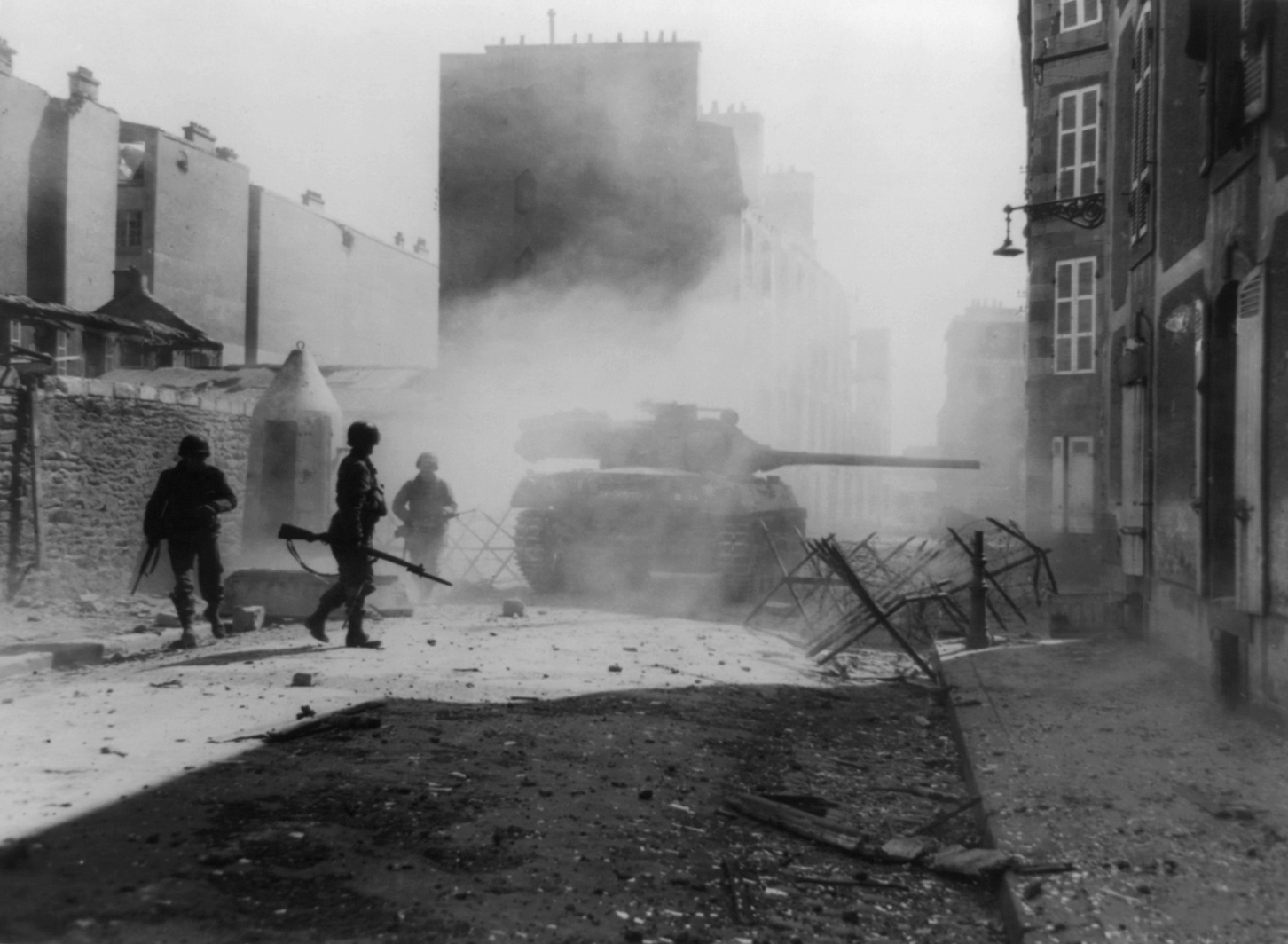
M18 of the battalion fighting inside Brest

On 23 August, one company (B) was assigned to the 2nd Infantry Division, fighting in the Battle for Brest; it was released on 19 September. Meanwhile, the remainder of the battalion was employed fighting on the Crozon Peninsula to the south of the port through September. A shortage of the M18 Hellcat in the supply chain – most battalions in France were equipped with M10s at the time – led to the battalion being assigned a number of M4A3 Shermans, which carried the same 76mm gun, as temporary replacements.

The battalion regrouped in late September, and trained replacements, before moving to the Moselle River. The battalion was attached to the 95th Infantry Division on 15 October, and deployed to relieve the 818th Tank Destroyer Battalion in the Pagny bridgehead on the 20th. It withdrew from the bridgehead in early November, after providing indirect fire support, and was released by the 95th Division on 2 November. It crossed the Moselle again and moved northeast, crossing the border into Germany near Merschweiler on 18 November. The company A of the battalion crossed the Moselle near Malling when assigned to the 90th Infantry Division.

== Ardennes ==
On 16 December, the Germans launched a major offensive throughout the Ardennes region of the Western Front, which would later become known as the Battle of the Bulge. The 705th, under the command of Lieutenant-Colonel Clifford D. Templeton, was ordered by Ninth Army to move south in the evening of 18 December, and join VIII Corps at Bastogne, a town on a critical road junction in the southern Ardennes. After delays to secure the town of La Roche, and a short engagement in which the command group was attacked, the command and combat elements of the battalion had fully arrived in Bastogne late on the night of 19 December. Templeton detached two platoons to hold a bridge at Ortheuville and a platoon to La Roche, and the supply and support elements were sent west, escorted by a single M18 and instructed to "hook up with some big friends".

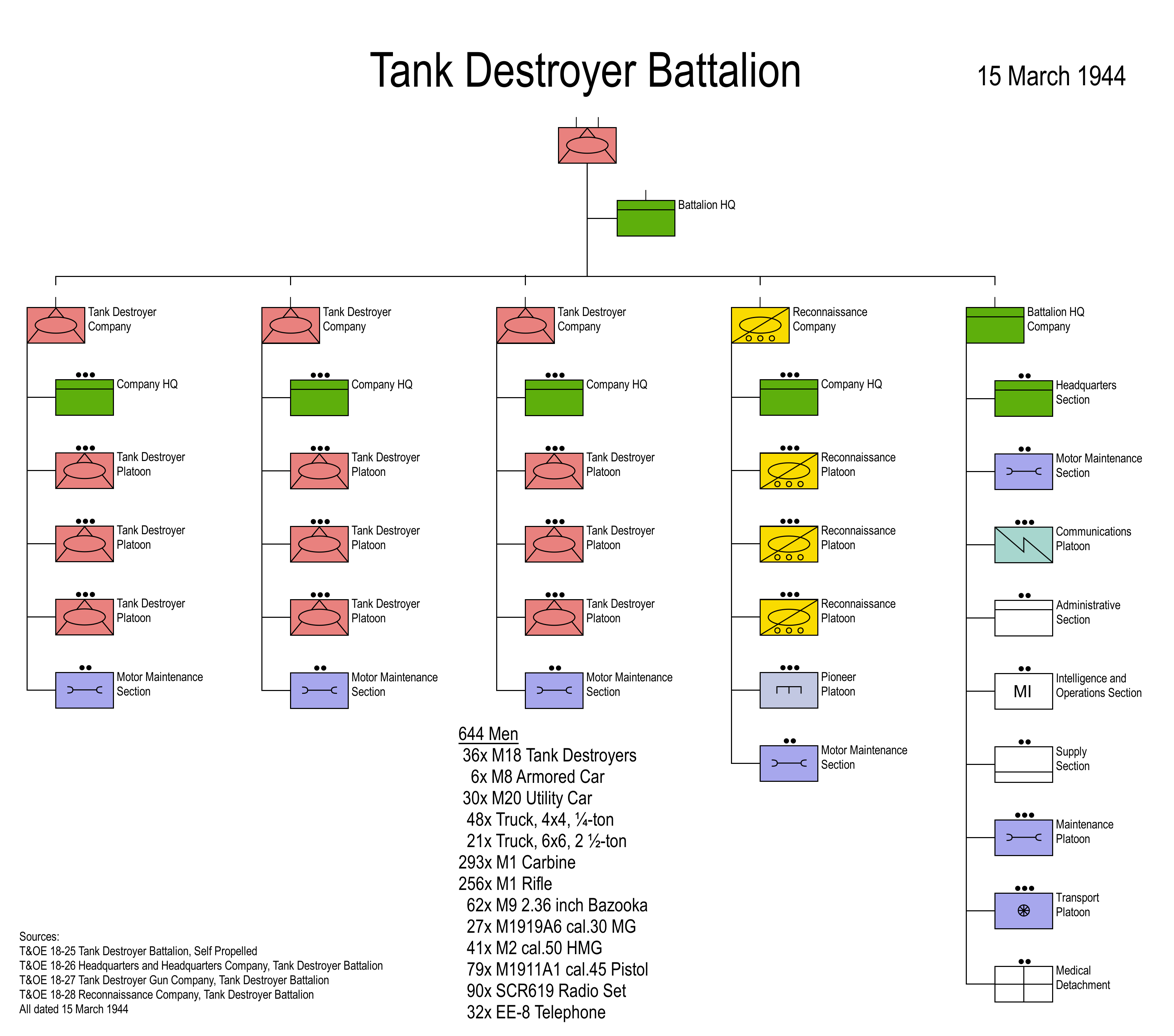
Tank Destroyer Battalion (SP) Structure - March 1944

A platoon was sent north from Bastogne on the early morning of the 20th to help relieve Task Force Desobry, defending the northeast approaches to the town. The platoon, accompanying a battalion of paratroopers, blunted the attack of the 2nd Panzer Division, destroying a number of German tanks. The battalion was formally attached to the 101st Airborne Division, the formation holding Bastogne, on 20 December, and was engaged throughout the siege, fighting a number of small actions. It provided a major part of the 101st's combat capabilities; on the 21st, the total armoured reserve available other than the 705th amounted to about forty operable medium tanks.

On the 24th, it was distributed between the 101st's regiments; a platoon to the 501st Parachute Infantry, two to the 506th Parachute Infantry, two to the 502nd Parachute Infantry and four to the 327th Glider Infantry, with one platoon deployed as a reserve in the town itself. On the 25th, Christmas Day, it was engaged in the thick of the fighting; an attack by eighteen Panzer IVs of 15th Panzergrenadier Division was broken up by M18s of the battalion. One half of the attack was caught in a close-range action by units of the 502nd PIR and a platoon of B Company; two M18s were knocked out at the start of the engagement, but the other pair quickly accounted for three Panzer IVs. The other half, meanwhile, was caught in a crossfire between four M18s, a group of M4 Shermans, a group of 105mm howitzers and infantry bazookas and destroyed.

Throughout the siege, the battalion destroyed around 40 German tanks, and lost only six M18s. The battalion remained stationed in Bastogne for the remainder of the Battle of the Bulge, being released by the 101st on 18 January, and withdrawn to rest and refit. The battalion would later be awarded the Presidential Unit Citation for its role in the defence of Bastogne.

== Germany ==
The battalion was attached to Combat Command B of the 11th Armored Division, part of Third Army, on 24 February, and committed to action on 1 March. On that same day Lieutenant-Colonel Clifford D. Templeton, battalion commander, was killed in action. He was succeeded by Major John Dibble.

The battalion crossed the Kyll River on 6 March, and pushed towards the Rhine with the 11th Armored, fighting all through March. The 705th crossed the Rhine at Oppenheim on 29 March, and continued to advance across southern Germany in April, seeing action in a number of small engagements. The battalion liberated two prisoner-of-war hospitals and a large forced-labour camp, and late in the month arrived at the Flossenbürg and Buchenwald concentration camps.

The battalion crossed the border into Austria on 1 May, and linked up with Soviet Army troops on 8 May, the day that the German surrender was announced.

== Postwar service ==
The battalion began occupation duties near Linz in June, and was inactivated in July. During its year in Europe, it lost 48 men, of whom 30 were killed at Bastogne, and received the Presidential Unit Citation.

The battalion's lineage is currently maintained by the 1st Squadron, 75th Cavalry Regiment (1–75 CAV).
