= 9th Infantry Division (Wehrmacht) =

9th Infantry Division 9th Volksgrenadier Division
- German: 9. Infanterie-Division; 9. Volksgrenadier-Division
- Unit insignia
- Active: 1 October 1934 – 9 October 1944; 13 October 1944 – April 1945
- Country: Nazi Germany
- Branch: German Army
- Type: Infantry
- Size: Division
- Engagements: World War II: Odessa Offensive

The 9th Infantry Division (9. Infanterie-Division) was a formation of Nazi Germany's Wehrmacht.

== History ==
The division was formed on 1 October 1934 in Gießen as Infanterieführer V. With the uncovering of German rearmament on 15 October 1935 the division was renamed 9. Infanterie-Division.

During the rout of the French Army in June 1940, the division massacred Black soldiers of the 4th Colonial Division (4e division d'infanterie coloniale) they had captured near Erquivillers. A German officer is cited in French reports as explaining "an inferior race does not deserve to do battle with a civilized race such as the Germans."

In August 1944 the division was destroyed in southern Ukraine and formally dissolved on 9 October 1944. The remnants of the division together with the shadow division Dennewitz, originally earmarked for the 584th Volksgrenadier Division, formed in the 9th Volksgrenadier Division (VGD). The 9th VGD fought in the Eifel where it surrendered to U.S. forces.

== Commanders ==
- Erich Lüdke 15 June 1935 – 7 March 1936
- Erwin Osswald 7 March 1936 – 1 December 1938
- Georg von Apell 1 December 1938 – 31 July 1940
- Erwin Vierow 1 August 1940 – 31 December 1940
- Siegmund Freiherr von Schleinitz 1 January 1941 – 19 August 1943
- Friedrich Hofmann 20 August 1943 – May 1944
- Otto-Hermann Brücker May 1944
- Friedrich Hofmann May 1944 – 16 June 1944
- Generalmajor Werner Gebb 16 June 1944 – 1 November 1944
- Generalmajor Werner Kolb 1 November 1944 – May 1945
