= Eugen Hartung =

Swiss painter

Eugen Hartung (born 5 July 1897 in Wäldi, Canton Thurgau; died 18 August 1973 in Zurich) was a Swiss painter and illustrator. He is well known for his paintings of anthropomorphic cats, published as postcards by Künzli before World War II and by Alfred Mainzer after the war.

Hartung grew up in an artistic family. His brother Wilhelm Hartung was a well-known painter and fresco artist, and his son Willi Hartung also became a painter.

After attending the Kunstgewerbeschule in Zurich, he made study trips to France and Italy, where he created numerous landscape and portrait paintings. Back in Switzerland, exhibitions followed, e.g. 1930 in the Kunsthaus Zurich.

However, he made his breakthrough as an illustrator, where he quickly became known to a large audience with his cover photos for the popular youth magazine "Der Globi". He worked for this magazine from 1930 to 1945. In addition, Hartung created illustrations for books such as "Der Schützenkönig" by Ernst Eschmann, Seldwyla Folks by Gottfried Keller, "Unser Heimatland 1291" by A. Gasser and his most famous work as illustrator for the songbook Chömed Chinde, mir wänd singe, published in 1946 by the Maggi food factory, Kemptthal. This song book is still published today and is remembered by several generations in Switzerland under the term "Maggi Singbuch". He was also a children's book illustrator.

Eugen Hartung achieved another great success with his numerous illustrations of cats in human form, which were distributed as postcards all over the world. Later, six books were published of his cat pictures.

In the 1930s, Eugen Hartung also created some murals for buildings in Zurich – often for kindergartens, but also for restaurants and Amtshaus V. The murals that still exist today are listed monuments.

His artistic versatility was also reflected in his work as a stage designer at the Stadttheater Zürich.

Hartung married Maria Magdalena, née Schmid, in 1923. She was the sister of the painter Konrad Schmid.
