= Werner Kolb =

- Born: 27 July 1895
- Died: 18 February 1975 (aged 79)
- Military career
- Allegiance: Nazi Germany
- Branch: Army (Wehrmacht)
- Rank: Generalmajor
- Commands: 9th Volksgrenadier Division
- Conflicts: World War II
- Awards: Knight's Cross of the Iron Cross with Oak Leaves

Werner Kolb (27 July 1895 – 18 February 1975) was a German general during World War II who commanded the 9th Volksgrenadier Division. He was a recipient of the Knight's Cross of the Iron Cross with Oak Leaves of Nazi Germany.

== Awards and decorations ==
- Clasp to the Iron Cross (1939) 2nd Class (16 June 1940) & 1st Class (4 July 1940)
- German Cross in Gold on 2 January 1942 as Major of the Reserves in the II./Infanterie-Regiment 36
- Knight's Cross of the Iron Cross with Oak Leaves
  - Knight's Cross on 27 June 1942 as Major of the Reserves and commander II./Infanterie-Regiment 36
  - Oak Leaves on 26 June 1944 as Oberst of the Reserves and commander of Grenadier-Regiment 36

Military offices
Preceded by Generalmajor Werner Gebb	Commander of 9. Volksgrenadier-Division; 1 November 1944 – 8 May 1945	Succeeded by None
