= 808th Tank Destroyer Battalion =

- Active: 1942–1945
- Disbanded: 1945
- Country: United States
- Allegiance: Army
- Part of: Independent unit
- Equipment: 3" anti-tank guns M36 tank destroyer

The 808th Tank Destroyer Battalion was a tank destroyer battalion of the United States Army active during the Second World War.

The battalion was activated on 27 March 1942. Commanded by LtCol. Robert C. McDonald Jr. it deployed into Normandy on 19 September, equipped with towed 3" anti-tank guns. It first saw action six days later, on the 25th, when it was attached to the 80th Infantry Division. It was detached from the 80th on 21 December, and moved to participate in the Battle of the Bulge, where it protected the flank of XII Corps through to late January. Elements of the division fought with the 5th Infantry Division in late December.

In February 1945 it re-equipped with M36 tank destroyers, and was then attached to the 76th Infantry Division for the drive to the Rhine. In April it was transferred to 65th Infantry Division and pushed through southern Germany with Third Army. At the beginning of May it moved to Linz, and ended the war inside Austria.

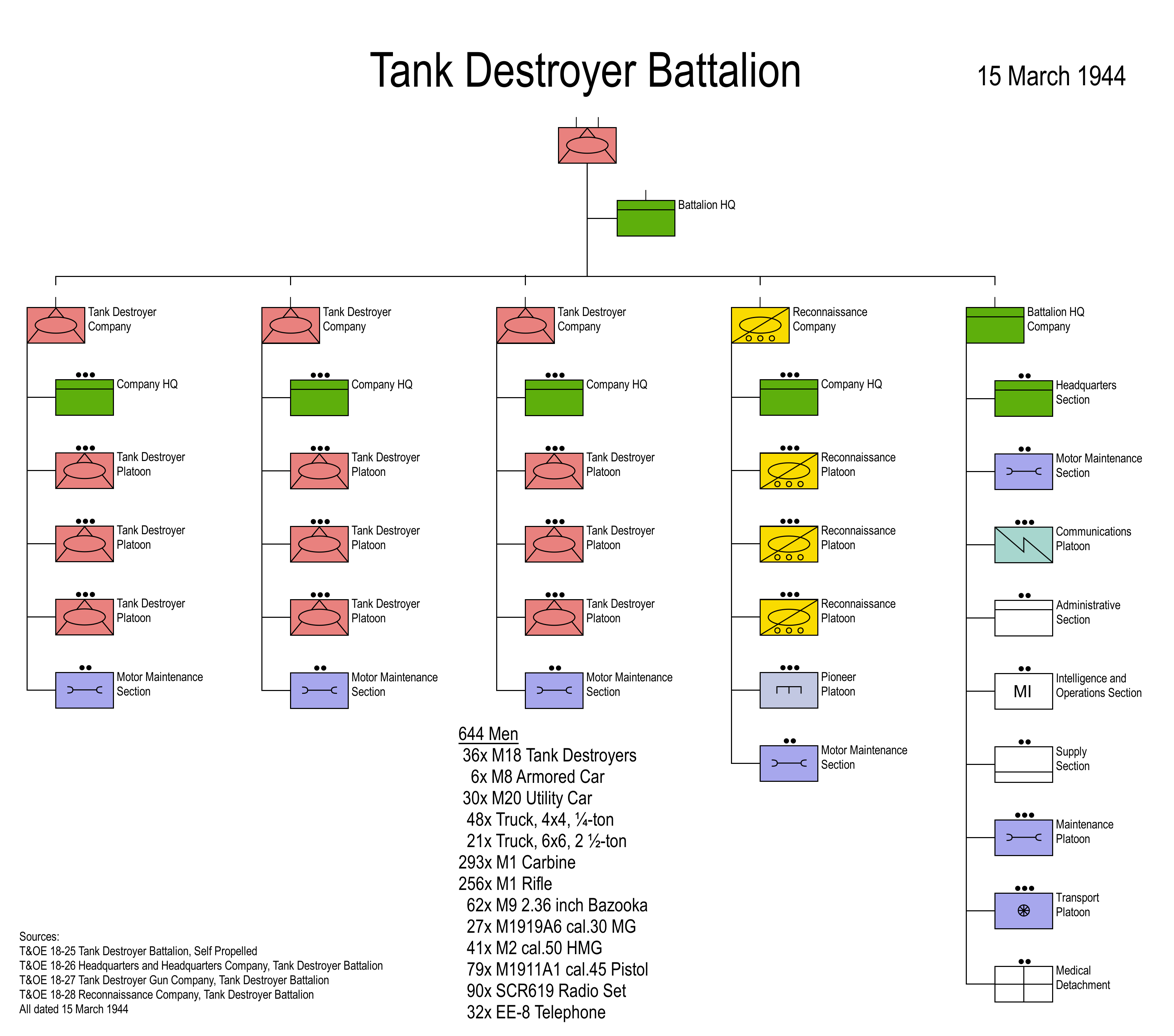
Tank Destroyer Battalion (SP) Structure – March 1944
