= Willi Hartung =

Swiss painter

Willi Hartung (1915–1987) was a Swiss watercolour painter. He was educated at the School of Arts and Crafts in Zurich. He was influenced by gothic art. He taught art in Princeton, New Jersey during the late 1960s.
