= Otto Schmidt-Hartung =

German general during World War II

- Born: 9 February 1892
- Died: 19 February 1976 (aged 84)
- Military career
- Allegiance: German Empire; Weimar Republic; Nazi Germany
- Branch: Army
- Service years: 1910–1920; 1935–1945
- Rank: Generalleutnant
- Commands: Infanterie-Regiment 35; HVS 564
- Conflicts: World War I World War II
- Awards: Knight's Cross of the Iron Cross

Otto Schmidt-Hartung (9 February 1892 – 19 February 1976) was a German general in the Wehrmacht of Nazi Germany during World War II.

== Awards and decorations ==
- Knight's Cross of the Iron Cross on 29 June 1940 as Oberst and commander of Infanterie-Regiment 35.
