= 338th Engineer General Service Regiment =

US army regiment

During World War II, the 338th Engineer General Service Regiment rebuilt the vital port of Livorno (Leghorn), in Northern Italy, in advance of the Fifth United States Army's assault on the German positions in the Po Valley.

The 338th was activated 4 September 1942 at Camp Atterbury, Indiana, and moved to Camp Claiborne, Louisiana, on 15 November 1942.

The regiment departed New York on 28 April 1943 (likely on the SS Santa Rosa) and arrived at Oran, Algeria, on 12 May 1943.

The 338th landed in Italy on 8 February 1944.

Livorno, 300 miles north of Naples on the western coast of Italy, was needed as a supply base for the North Apennines campaign, but the port was the most thoroughly demolished one in the Mediterranean. The Germans had erected barricades, blown bridges, laid mines, and sunk twenty ships to completely seal off the harbor entrances. The Allies also contributed to the destruction; in some 50 raids during the first half of 1944, they dropped more than 1,000 tons of bombs.

Elements of the 34th Infantry Division (United States) captured Livorno on 19 July 1944. The 338th, which had been working on hospitals in Rome, had no experience in port repair, but drew the assignment anyway. Twelve men from the 338th Engineers arrived in the city a few hours later to clear mines from predetermined routes into the port area. Leghorn was heavily mined, and for the first few days little other than mine clearing could be accomplished. As the mine-clearing teams made room, more elements of the 338th arrived, set up quarters, and began preparing a berth for the LST and the LCT carrying construction equipment.

By 26 July, both craft had unloaded. In the meantime, engineers repaired electrical lines and started to restore the municipal water system.

The primary task for the 338th engineers was to reconstruct berths for ships. The 338th received planning aid from several specialists of the 1051st Engineer Port and Repair Group, representatives of the British Navy charged with clearing the waters of Leghorn harbor, and shipowners and contractors who knew the port. Within a month, berths for six Liberty ships had been completed giving Leghorn a capacity of 5,000 tons per day. The goal of 12,000 tons per day was reached by the end of September, as projected.

As the berths were completed, the 338th turned its attention to rebuilding roads, bridges, hospitals, depots, and camps. Every task required extensive minesweeping. Working together with Italian soldiers and civilians, the engineers were able to amass and distribute the large volume of supplies required.

Assured of a strong supply base in the rear, Fifth Army moved rapidly forward into the Po River valley.

For its accomplishments, the 338th was awarded the Meritorious Service Unit Plaque per General Orders No. 66, Headquarters, Peninsular Base Section, 24 February 1945. The citation was as follows:

"The 338th Engineer General Service Regiment, Peninsular Base Section, for superior performance of duty in the accomplishment of an exceptionally difficult mission in Italy from 17 July 1944 to 30 September 1944. This regiment entered the Port of Leghorn under artillery fire and through extensive mine fields, moved equipment over bombed out roads and bridges, cleared streets and dock areas that were completely blocked by debris from demolished buildings and other structures; removed thousands of enemy mines, built new roads and bridges, repaired utilities, and planned and constructed berthing and unloading facilities in one of the most completely destroyed ports as yet encountered in Italy. The 338th Engineer General Service Regiment by careful planning and proper organi- zation, vigorous prosecution of the work over long hours and exceptional ingenuity and engineering skill placed the Port of Leghorn in operating conditions within six (6) weeks after its capture. The accomplishments of the 338th Engineer General Service Regiment during this period are in the highest traditions of the military service".

The 338th returned to the U.S. at Boston on the Liberty Ship SS Zebulon Pike 8 November 1945 after 2 years, 6 months, and 10 days overseas.

The 338th was inactivated at Camp Myles Standish, Mass., on 9 November 1945.
