= Erich-Otto Schmidt =

Erich Otto Schmidt
- Born: 17 August 1899; Annaberg, Kingdom of Saxony, German Empire
- Died: 18 June 1959 (aged 59); Bühlertal, Baden-Württemberg, West Germany
- Military career
- Allegiance: Weimar Republic; Nazi Germany
- Branch: Freikorps; Reichsheer; German Army
- Service years: 1919–1945
- Rank: Generalmajor
- Units: Cuirassier Regiment "von Driesen" (Westphalian) No. 4 Volunteer Division "von Lettow-Vorbeck"
- Commands: 352nd Volksgrenadier Division
- Conflicts: World War II: Poland Campaign; Eastern Front; Battle of the Bulge
- Awards: Knight's Cross of the Iron Cross

Erich Otto Schmidt (often wrongly Erich-Otto; 17 August 1899 – 18 June 1959) was a general in the Wehrmacht of Nazi Germany during World War II who commanded the 352. Volksgrenadier Division. He was a recipient of the Knight's Cross of the Iron Cross.

== Promotions ==
- 6 March 1919 Freiwilliger (Volunteer)
- 21 March 1920 Unteroffizier (NCO/Corporal/Junior Sergeant)
- 1 September 1922 Fähnrich (Officer Cadet)
- 1 August 1923 Oberfähnrich (Senior Officer Cadet)
- 1 March 1924 Leutnant (2nd Lieutenant)
- 1 February 1928 Oberleutnant (1st Lieutenant)
- 1 June 1934 Hauptmann (Captain)
- 31 March 1939 Major with effect and Rank Seniority (RDA) from 1 April 1939 (130)
- 18 January 1942 Oberstleutnant (Lieutenant Colonel) with effect and RDA from 1 February 1942 (259)
- 8 August 1943 Oberst (Colonel) with effect and RDA from 1 June 1943 (49b)
- 15 January 1945 Generalmajor (Major General) with effect and RDA from 1 January 1945 (26)

== Awards and decorations ==
- Wehrmacht Long Service Award, 4th to 2nd Class
  - 4th to 3rd Class on 2 October 1936
  - 2nd Class for 18 years in 1937
- Iron Cross (1939), 2nd and 1st Class
  - 2nd Class on 4 October 1939
  - 1st Class on 10 August 1941
- Winter Battle in the East 1941–42 Medal on 22 August 1942
- Infantry Assault Badge in Bronze on 9 October 1942
- Wound Badge (1939) in Black in December 1944
- Knight's Cross of the Iron Cross on 4 August 1943 as Oberstleutnant and Commander of the Grenadier-Regiment 679

== Sources ==
- German Federal Archives: BArch PERS 6/1867 and PERS 6/300809

Military offices
Preceded by Generalmajor Eberhard von Schuckmann	Commander of 352. Volksgrenadier Division; 6 October 1944 - 19 December 1944	Succeeded by Generalmajor Richard Bazing
