= Billy Hartung (actor) =

American actor

Billy Hartung, also known as Bill Hartung and William Hartung, is an American actor and dancer with credits ranging from Broadway to film.

== Formative years and family ==
Born in Pittsburgh, Pennsylvania in 1971, Hartung is a graduate of Seton-La Salle Catholic High School and received a BFA from Point Park University. He is a father of 6 children.

== Career ==
Hartung made his acting debut in 1991 in the made-for-TV movie Guilty Until Proven Innocent. In 1993, he made his big screen debut as a boat preppie in the movie Striking Distance, which was filmed in his hometown of Pittsburgh.

Hartung appeared in the original cast of the Broadway productions of Side Show, as Roustabout, and Footloose, as Chuck Cranston. He also appeared in the film version of Chicago.

The executive director of Mt. Lebanon's Center for Theater Arts in 2025, Hartung had previously studied at that center, as a pupil of Mary Beth Gigler.
