= 341st Engineer General Service Regiment =

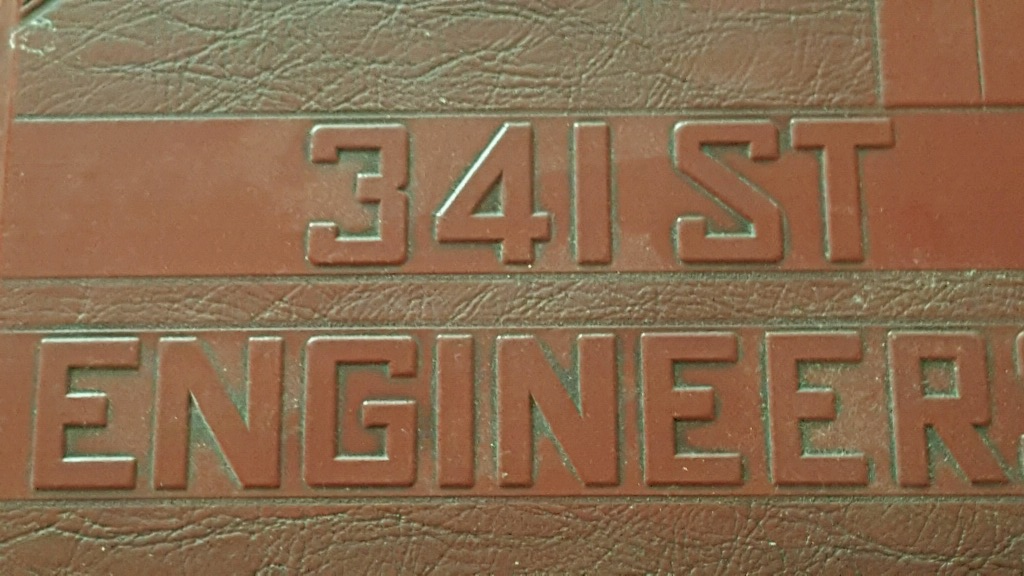
- Active: Regiment organized in November 1922 and disbanded March 3, 1946
- Disbanded: 3/22/1946
- Countries: United States, France, England, Belgium, Luxembourg, Germany
- Branch: Army
- Type: Engineer
- Role: Airfield, Bridge, Road, Port, and Railroad Construction
- Size: Regiment
- Engagements: Battle of the Bulge

Commanders
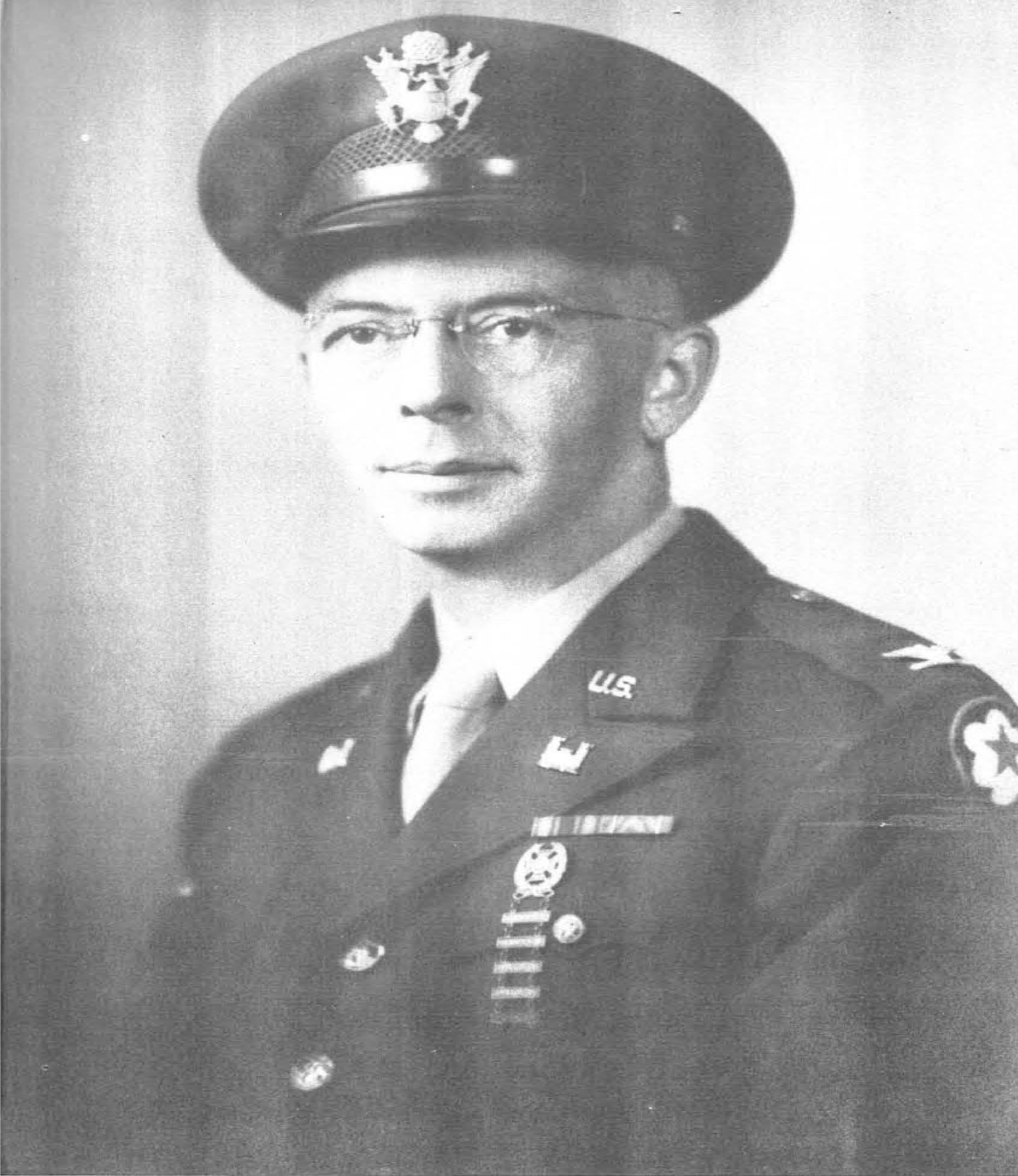
- Col: Edward H. Coe
- Capt.: W. C. Leonard
- Lt. Col: Albert L. Lane

The 341st Engineer General Service Regiment was part of the 1102nd Engineer Group of the US Army during World War II and participated in the western Europe theatre specializing in Railroad Construction. The regiment was involved in the Battle of the Bulge, especially in the Arlon, Belgium region of the front lines.
