= 735th Tank Battalion (United States) =

- Active: 10 January 1943 – 25 October 1945
- Country: United States
- Allegiance: United States Army
- Type: Tank/Armor
- Size: Battalion
- Part of: Independent Unit
- Motto: Key to Victory
- Equipment: M4 Sherman; M5 Stuart
- Engagements: World War II: Normandy; Northern France; Rhineland; Ardennes-Alsace; Central Europe

Insignia
- Identification symbol: No unit insignia authorized

The 735th Tank Battalion was an independent tank battalion that participated in the European Theater of Operations with the United States Army in World War II. The battalion entered combat in Normandy in July 1944 with the 5th Infantry Division and fought across France with the 95th Infantry Division. When reattached to the 5th Infantry Division, the 735th Tank Battalion played a key role in the reduction of the fortifications of Metz. The battalion was also attached to the 26th Infantry Division during the Battle of the Bulge and fought the last several months of the war attached to the 87th Infantry Division. It was inactivated in October 1945.

== Organization ==
The 735th Tank Battalion followed the standard organization of a U.S. medium tank battalion during World War II. It consisted of a Headquarters and Headquarters Company, Service Company, three medium tank companies (Companies A, B, and C) and a light tank company (Company D).

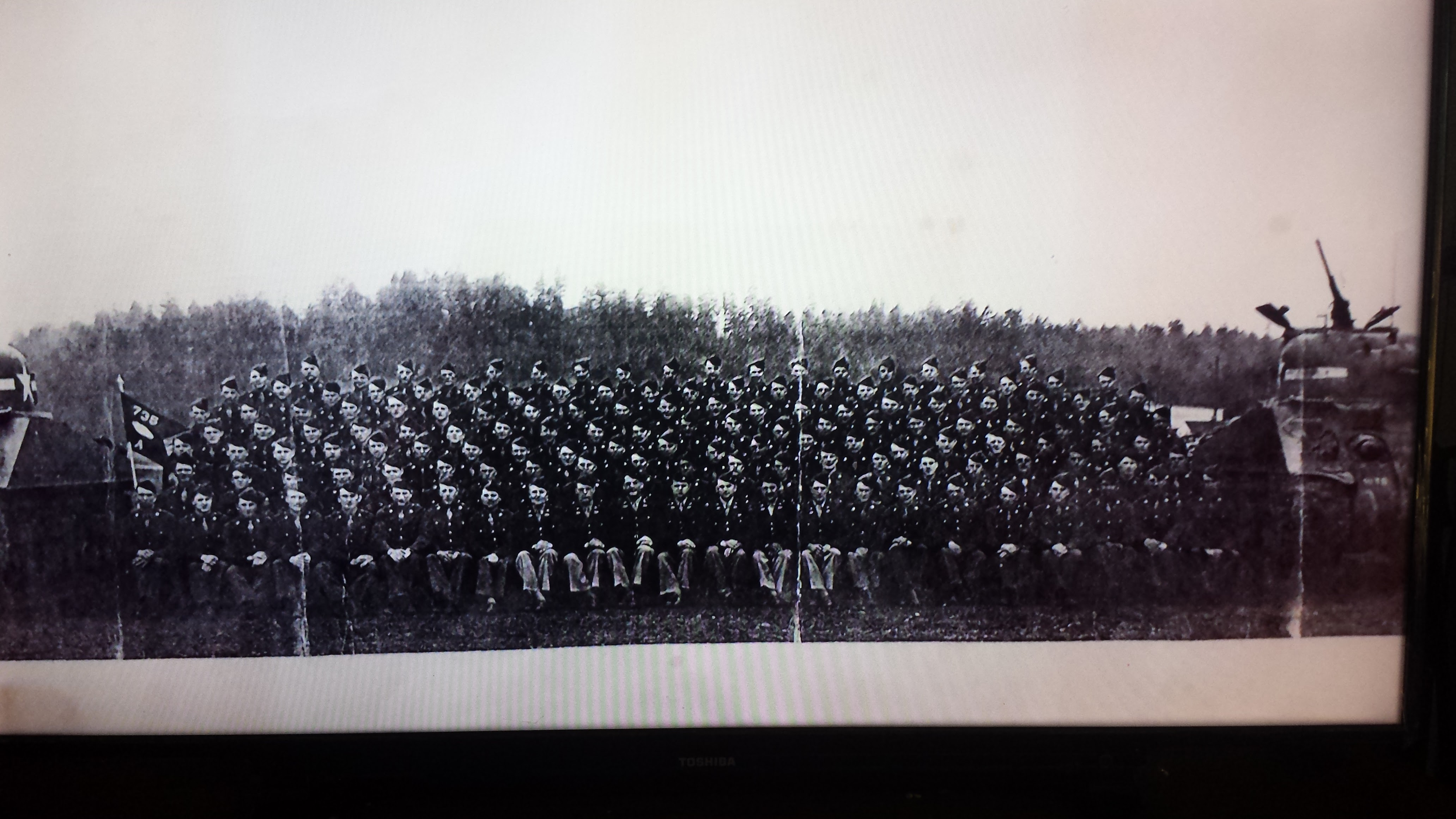
735th Tank Battalion Co. A

- Headquarters Company included the battalion headquarters staff, both officers and enlisted men; an assault gun platoon, consisting of three Sherman tank variants armed with a 105 mm assault gun; a mortar platoon, equipped with three half-track mounted 81 mm mortars; a reconnaissance platoon with five quarter-ton “peeps” (jeeps); and the headquarters tank section consisting of two tanks for the battalion commander and operations officer. The 735th consolidated its assault guns with the assault guns of the medium tank companies into a single platoon, which was frequently under the operational control of the division artillery in order to provide additional indirect fire support to the division.

- The Service Company included a headquarters section; a maintenance platoon; and a large battalion supply and transportation platoon, with over thirty trucks to provide logistics for the battalion.

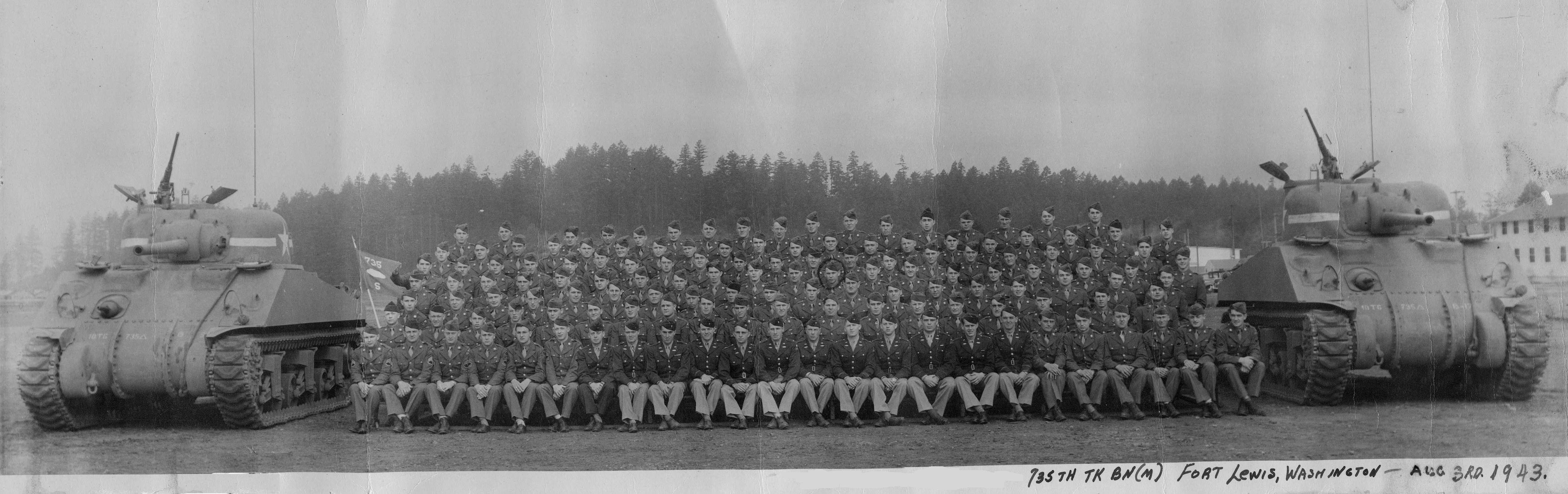
735th Tank Battalion Service Co

- Companies A, B, C, and D – the tank line companies, both medium and light, all followed the same table of organization. Each company consisted of a headquarters section which, along with a small headquarters staff also included two tanks for the company commander and executive officer; three five-tank platoons; and, in the medium tank companies, a single 105 mm assault gun. The medium tank companies were equipped with M4 Sherman tanks, while the light tank company was equipped with M5 Stuart tanks. The authorized assault gun for each medium tank company was consolidated with the assault guns in the headquarters company. All four companies had their own maintenance section which included a M32 Tank Recovery Vehicle, built on a Sherman chassis. Because the Stuart carried a 4-man crew versus a 5-man crew on the Sherman, it had a lower personnel strength than the medium tank companies. One task organization unique to the 735th was to attach one assault gun and one 81 mm mortar half-track to a platoon of light tanks from Company D in order to provide it effective firepower to operate independently.

== History ==
=== Activation and deployment ===
The 735th Tank Battalion was activated at Fort Lewis, Washington on 10 January 1943 as the 735th Tank Battalion (Medium), drawing its initial cadre of officers from the 743rd Tank Battalion After undergoing basic training for the new recruits and draftees, then tank training, the battalion rail-loaded in late summer to La Pine, Oregon to conduct large scale maneuvers. On 1 November 1943, the unit was redesignated as the 735th Tank Battalion and adopted the organization in which it would fight throughout the European Campaign. The battalion left La Pine and rail loaded to Yakima Anti-Aircraft Artillery Range in November. While at Yakima the company of light tanks, Company D, was formed, although they did not receive the M5 Stuart tanks until they returned to Fort Lewis in December. On 23 January 1944, the 735th boarded a troop train at Fort Lewis, bound for Camp Myles Standish, Massachusetts, en route for the European Theater of Operations.

The 735th embarked in Boston aboard the USAT Henry Gibbins on 11 February 1944 and arrived in Glasgow, Scotland on 22 February, though they did not disembark until the following day. Once back on land, the battalion immediately boarded a troop train for Nuneaton, England and occupied a camp set up on Arbury Estate. The battalion conducted individual and small unit training, much of it dismounted, and performed maintenance on their tanks while waiting to go into combat in France. While at Nuneaton, they were also informed they would support the 5th Infantry Division, which at the time was bivouacked in Northern Ireland. While a few liaison trips were made, no combined training was conducted before deployment. In early July 1944, the 735th Tank Battalion was alerted to road march to Weymouth, where they boarded LST's (Landing Ship Tank) and for Company D, LCT's (Landing Craft, Tank), bound for France.

=== Early combat in France ===
The 735th Tank Battalion disembarked at Utah Beach on 13 July 1944 and was attached to the 5th Infantry Division the same day. Their task organization with the division was as follows:

- Battalion Headquarters, Service Company, Company A and Company D – 2nd Infantry Regiment (after 30 July, the Headquarters and Service companies were relieved of attachment to the 2nd Infantry and were attached directly to 5th Infantry Division.)
- Company B – 10th Infantry Regiment
- Company C – 11th Infantry Regiment

On 15 July, the battalion relieved the 745th Tank Battalion in the vicinity of Sallen, France and their assault gun platoon fired the unit's first combat mission supporting the division's artillery. Over the next several days the battalion trained for action in the French bocage and fitted hedge cutters to their tanks. With the start of Operation Cobra, the battalion went on the offensive on 26 July, with Company A attacking Vidouville in support of the 2nd Infantry Regiment and losing seven tanks to enemy action, to a combination of mines and anti-tank gun fire. The tankers and the infantry they were supporting battled through the end of July to break out of the bocage against dogged German defense by the crack 9th and 15th Parachute Regiments. However, by the beginning of August 1944, the German resistance began to crumble, and the 735th began to race south with Companies D and B assisting the 10th Infantry Regiment in taking Angers on 11 August.

At Angers, the 5th Infantry Division and the 735th Tank Battalion reoriented sharply to the left and began advancing northeast toward Paris. By 15 August, the Battalion had reached the vicinity of Chartres, and assisted the division in first enveloping then liberating the city. From Chartres, the battalion turned east and skirted to the south of Fontainebleu, reaching the Seine River on 24 August, where Company C provided covering fire to engineers bridging the river. Company C advanced across the bridge the next day supporting the 11th Infantry Regiment. By 26 August, the remainder of the battalion was east of the Seine, and rapidly proceeding east toward Reims, crossing the Marne on 28 August, and taking the city on 30 August. After this sustained drive across France, the battalion's equipment was worn and in need of maintenance.

=== The siege of Metz ===
Due to the logistical challenges of supplying units now hundreds of miles from their supply bases, the 735th Tank Battalion's rapid advance across France came to an abrupt end. As the battalion moved east from Reims, all the tank companies ran out of fuel for several days during the first week of September 1944, including one company in which 14 of 17 tanks ran out of gas as they approached Verdun. A final dash from 5–8 September allowed the battalion to reach the western approaches to Metz, but German resistance had already stiffened. The battalion supported the 10th Infantry Regiment in crossing the Moselle River south of Metz at Arnaville on 11 September, with Companies B and C fording the barely passable river, with several tanks swamped in midstream. In defending the bridgehead to the east of the river, Company D, whose light tanks were generally too thinly armored for most offensive operations but light enough to cross the bridges over the Moselle, was deployed for the first time as a separate unit in order help protect the southern flank of the bridgehead.

On 20 September, Companies B and A supported the 10th Infantry and 2nd Infantry Regimental Combat Teams (RCT's), as they attacked east toward Pournoy-la-Chétive and Coin-sur-Seille, respectively. The 2nd RCT reached its objective after heavy fighting, but Company A suffered no casualties. The attack on Pournoy met stiff resistance. Although the town was taken the same day, in the ensuing two days of counterattacks Company B took heavy casualties and had to be replaced by Company C in order to reorganize. Despite the heavy cost to seize the two towns, the 5th Infantry Division withdrew from both positions because of their untenable exposure to counterattack and artillery fires.

In early October, a composite company consisting of the 76 mm gunned tanks recently fielded in the battalion and the 105 mm assault guns was formed to support the attack on Fort Driant. The tanks received special concrete piercing ammunition and towed “snakes”, long tubes of explosive similar to Bangalore torpedoes to be used for clearing obstacles. The tankers supported the 2nd Battalion, 11th Infantry Regiment in the assault starting on 3 October. The tankers cleared a number of obstacles and helped beat back a number of determined German counterattacks with use of their coaxial machine guns. Both the special ammunition and the snakes were disappointing failures. The tankers suffered heavy losses, losing nine of sixteen tanks and 24 men killed, wounded or captured by 7 October, but enabled the infantry to penetrate the outer reaches of the fort. Afterward, while the infantry were able to make modest gains against fierce German resistance, the tankers were not able to play a further role in the pitched battles in and under the bunkers, and the remaining tanks were kept on as part of the mobile reserve for the attack. After the infantry suffered heavy losses attempting to penetrate into the main bunkers, the attack was abandoned and the infantry withdrew on 13 October.

After the unsuccessful attack on Fort Driant, the medium tank companies were attached to the division artillery and fired indirect fire missions in support of the infantry in contact or as interdictory fires. This indirect fire support quickly totaled over a thousand rounds of high explosive or smoke ammunition per day. On 20 October 1944, the untried 95th Infantry Division relieved the 5th Infantry Division in place on the bridgehead between the Moselle and Seille Rivers, giving the 5th a well-needed rest from the line. During the relief, the 735th Tank Battalion remained in the line and was detached from the 5th Infantry Division and attached to the 95th. While operating with the 95th, the tank companies were attached to the Infantry Regiments as follows:

- Company A – 377th Infantry Regiment
- Company B – 378th Infantry Regiment
- Company C – 379th Infantry Regiment
- Company D – 3rd Battalion, 377th Infantry Regiment in division reserve

The tankers continued their artillery fire support for the 95th Infantry Division, and fired in excess of 10,000 rounds of 75 mm and 76 mm ammunition before being withdrawn on 27 October to a rear assembly area for maintenance.

On 2 November, the battalion reverted to 5th Infantry Division control as the 95th Infantry Division was moved to another sector north of Metz. The battalion conducted training of new replacements and maintenance of vehicles and equipment while they waited to resume the attack on Metz. On 5 November, the battalion, minus Company B was attached to the 2nd Infantry Regiment, while Company B was attached to the 10th Infantry Regiment in anticipation of the pending attack. The assault began on 9 November, and the tanks moved forward with the infantry as the 5th Infantry Division attacked to the east and north, flanking Metz from the south. It was during this advance that 1st Platoon of Company A was awarded the Presidential Unit Citation and the French Croix de Guerre with Palm for its role supporting the 2nd Infantry Regiment in defending a critical bridgehead across the Neid River in the vicinity of Bazoncourt against six hard-pressed German counterattacks. On 19 November, in the vicinity of Retonfey, the assault gun section met the lead element of the 90th Reconnaissance Troop, 90th Infantry Division, attacking from the northern flank of Metz, and completed the encirclement of the city. The battalion then assisted in the reduction of the city, firing many hundreds of rounds of primarily captured French 75 mm white phosphorus (WP) rounds (which were of questionable quality and which required special firing pins) at the remaining German held forts of Driant, Jeanne d’Arc, and Privot. The WP rounds were intended to create sufficient heat and smoke within the underground bunkers to drive the defenders out, a tactic which was at least partially successful, and Fort Privot surrendered to a representative of the battalion and of the 11th Infantry Regiment on 29 November. The same day, Company B represented the battalion in a parade celebrating the fall of the city, while Company A continued firing WP rounds at the remaining two forts until 7 December, and these finally fell on 7 and 8 December, and the last German defenders surrendered on 13 December.

=== Battle of the Bulge ===
Even as the battalion assisted with mopping up operations around Metz, the tankers began to advance into Germany. Company B joined the 10th RCT and was attached to the 95th Infantry Division, forming the core of “Task Force Bell,” augmented further by Company D, the 6th Cavalry Group, a company of tank destroyers, a troop of the 28th Cavalry, and a direct support artillery battalion. TF Bell crossed the border into Germany between Creutzwald and Völklingen on 5 December with the objective of overwhelming German resistance along the upper Saar River. Over the next three days, TF Bell pushed steadily east and reached the Saar on 8 December. The remainder of the battalion crossed into Germany by 9 December 1944 and conducted maintenance on their vehicles over the next week while the 5th Infantry Division was again relieved by the 95th Infantry Division and went into reserve. On 16–17 December, Companies A and C moved to Saarlouis (then called Saarlautern), Germany to relieve the 778th Tank Battalion. The remainder of the battalion remained in the 95th Infantry Division's sector, even though still attached to the 5th. The 95th however wanted them out of sector, and the battalion finally cleared their sector on 19 December.

In the meantime, the German counteroffensive in the Ardennes, known as the Battle of the Bulge, had begun to the north on 16 December 1944. Initially, this did not affect the battalion, which continued to support the attack on Saarlouis with Companies A and C, while the remainder of the battalion was in reserve. However, on 20 December, the battalion received orders to move to the vicinity of Stuckange, France, north of Metz near the Luxembourg border. The battalion had to move in two parts, as Companies A and C were still in contact on the east side of the Saar river, at Saarlouis and Fraulautern, respectively, and had to disengage first. Only briefly halting at Stuckange, the 735th rolled in battalion formation through Thionville and Luxembourg City, to Hagen, Luxembourg, which they reached in the early morning hours of 21 December. Upon reaching Hagen, the battalion was attached to the 26th Infantry Division. Upon attachment, the tank companies were assigned as follows:

- Company A – 101st Infantry Regiment
- Company B – 104th Infantry Regiment
- Company C – 328th Infantry Regiment
- Company D – Division Headquarters Command Post (for security)

Beginning on 22 December, the infantry with tank support advanced to Rambrouch and Grosbous with limited attacks further to the northwest. The 26th was still a mostly untried unit, and the tankers were surprised at the infantry's lack of fluency in working with tanks, and by their reluctance to enter towns in the area, and on several occasions the tankers fought unsupported in the towns. They also encountered numerous Panther, Tiger, and even King Tiger tanks. Despite the inferiority of their Sherman tanks, the tankers were able to account for some dozen tanks by the end of the year against the loss of 5 Shermans.

The 26th covered the right flank of the 4th Armored Division, which was assigned the task of relieving the defenders of Bastogne. The division moved north on an axis toward Wiltz and were in front of the town by year's end, and severed the Wiltz-Bastogne road in early January 1945. The tankers had extreme difficulty maneuvering in the rugged and icy terrain, and found that at times the M5 light tanks were better able to negotiate the cold conditions. Through the remainder of January, the 735th supported the 26th Infantry Division to help seal off the “Bulge” and restore a coherent front in the sector. During this time tankers became intermingled with elements of at least four different divisions, the 26th, 35th, 90th, and 17th Airborne, with platoon teams roaming in sector to contact any enemy elements they encountered in terrain so broken that radio contact at any higher level was intermittent at best.

=== Advance into Germany ===
The month of February started with a flurry of detachment and attachment to other units. Two platoons of tanks from Companies B and C that had been attached to the 17th Airborne Division returned to the battalion on 1 February. That same day the battalion was attached to the 95th Infantry Division, but on 2 February they were informed they had been attached to the 87th Infantry Division, effective the previous day. The 735th Tank Battalion would maintain their relationship with the 87th until after the end of the war. When they reported to the 87th, the tank companies were further attached as follows:

- Company A – 345th Infantry Regiment
- Company B – 346th Infantry Regiment
- Company C – 347th Infantry Regiment

The remainder of the battalion was under division control as division reserve. Initially, the battalion's tank companies spanned the Belgian-German border between Manderfeld and Auw. The battalion spent most of the month in defensive positions, with limited offensive action at the beginning and end of the month. Their forced inactivity was primarily due to rainy and snowy weather and the resulting poor road conditions, but did allow them to perform much needed maintenance on the vehicles. By the end of February the tankers had only moved about 10 miles eastward, suffering light losses, with only one killed and no tank losses.

The battalion's final assault into Germany commenced late on 26 February 1945, with 87th attacking the West Wall near Ormont. The tankers cooperated with tank destroyers (TD's) armed with 90 mm guns to systematically reduce pillboxes in the West Wall, clearing the way for the infantry to seize first Ormont, then Reuth and Kerschenbach by 5 March. The renewed offensive also highlighted disagreements between the experienced tankers and the relatively untried 87th. Although usually resolved amicably enough, the strains between the tankers and usually more senior but less experienced infantry commanders surfaced regularly until the infantry gained experience and developed confidence in the abilities of the tankers.

Having penetrated the West Wall, the 87th discovered effective German resistance had nearly collapsed. The division commander organized Task Force Muir from elements of the 345th RCT, Company B of the 735th, and other supporting elements, to exploit the breakthrough. On 7 March, TF Muir crossed the Kyll River and on 8 March seized intact a bridge across the Ahr River at Dollendorf. This advance of some 30 km over 3 days represented a modest gain, but foreshadowed a return to the rapid advances not seen since before the battalion ran out of gas at the approaches to Verdun in early September. TF Muir was dissolved on 8 March and the division was squeezed out of sector and went into corps reserve, the tankers along with them. Back on the offensive on 13 March, the division continued east with the mission of taking Koblenz. Company A supported the 345th RCT north of the Moselle River to the west bank of the Rhine. By 16 March, the 345th RCT with Company B was across the Moselle in the vicinity of Kobern and Winningen and had effectively encircled Koblenz. Most of Koblenz had been taken by 18 March and on the following day Fort Konstantin, overlooking the city from above, finally surrendered.

Company C supported the 347th RCT as they advanced south along the left bank of the Rhine and cleared German resistance as far south as Boppard. With just a few days to regroup and prepare for a forced crossing of the Rhine, the division crossed at Boppard the night of 24 March, with the tanks providing fire support from the west bank. The tanks of Company B were the first ones ferried across, soon after the initial infantry assault. After consolidating its positions on the east bank of the Rhine, the division moved out on 28 March in the direction of Limburg, with the battalion helping screen the division's left flank along the Lahn River. The tankers penetrated into the heart of Germany, encountering sporadic strongpoints along their route of march. Also on 28 March, Company C was attached to the 76th Infantry Division, with the platoons parceled out to the division's three infantry regiments. With the company so thoroughly dispersed, support for the tanks and crews was nearly impossible, and the battalion complained bitterly to not permit platoon attachments when a company is detached outside the division they are supporting. On 2 April, Company C reverted to battalion control.

For the first few days of April 1945, the division regrouped one last time and launched from south of Limburg starting on 3 April. The battalion supported the division's advance past Giessen toward Eisenach through Thuringia and Saxony, taking Plauen on 17 April. The tankers continued past Plauen, advancing as far as Klingenthal on the Czech border at by 6 May. They halted short of the border to prevent crossing into Russian area of operations and were in these positions on V-E Day on 8 May 1945.

=== Post war ===
The 735th Tank Battalion went immediately into occupation duties upon cessation of hostilities. Initially the battalion helped the infantry receive and guard the persistent stream of surrendering German soldiers. With an eye on the planned invasion of Japan, key leaders, including 3 out of 4 tank company commanders and 12 of 15 lieutenant platoon leaders, were stripped from the battalion and assigned to the 771st Tank Destroyer Battalion, destined for duty in the Pacific Ocean Theater of Operations. As a relatively senior unit, the rest of the 735th was slated to return to the United States and presumed deactivation.

The battalion withdrew gradually from what was to become the Soviet occupation zone already agreed at the Yalta Conference. While still in the Soviet zone, the battalion was given the unique mission of transporting repatriated eastern European slave laborers from Plauen to Chomutov in Czechoslovakia using the battalion's trucks. After displacing to the US zone, on 12 July 1945, the battalion was given another unusual mission and was tasked to return to the Soviet zone to pick up German prisoners, wounded, and attending medical staff located at Gera and Grimma which had fought the Americans. Although the Russians at Gera refused to hand over the Germans, the patients and staff at Grimma were duly handed over on 13 July and the convoy returned to Hersfeld in the American zone on 14 July.

As preparations for return to the United States continued, one of the major tasks was to turn in tanks and equipment. In the process of turning in the battalion's ammunition, estimated at about 10,000 main gun rounds and a million rounds of small arms ammunition, one of the ammunition handlers spotted a round of high-explosive ammunition whose fuze was smoking. After a quick warning the ammunition team evacuated the site just as the round exploded, setting off a series of explosions. Even with such short warning, there were no injuries, though damage to nearby buildings was severe.

In early fall 1945, the battalion redeployed to one of the cigarette camps located around Le Havre to await their ship back to the United States. In mid-October, the battalion boarded the Kingston Victory at Le Havre, bound for Boston.

The 735th Tank Battalion arrived in Boston on 24 October and was inactivated at Camp Myles Standish, Massachusetts, on 25 October 1945.

== Unit awards and decorations ==
- Company C, Presidential Unit Citation: 23–25 December 1944, War Department General Order 79-47.
- 1st Platoon, Company A only, Presidential Unit Citation: 12–13 November 1944, War Department General Order 68-45.
- 1st Platoon, Company A only, French Croix de Guerre with Palm: 12–14 November 1944, Department of the Army General Order 43–50.
- Citation in the Order of the Day of the Belgian Army: 20 December 1944 – 26 January 1945, Department of the Army General Order 43–50

== Bibliography ==
- Blumenson, Martin. Breakout and Pursuit. Washington, DC: U.S. Army Center of Military History: 1993.
- Cole, High M. The Lorraine Campaign. Washington, DC: U.S. Army Center of Military History: 1993.
- Combined Arms Research Library (CARL) Digital Collection. "After Action Report, 735th Tank Battalion, July–November 1944, February–March 1945".
- Fuermann, George M. and Cranz, F. Edward. Ninety-Fifth Infantry Division HISTORY: 1918–1946. Atlanta, GA: Albert Love Enterprises.
- Headquarters, Department of the Army. DA Pam 672-1 Unit Citation and Campaign Participation Credit Register. Washington, DC: U.S. Army, July 1961.
- Headquarters, United States Forces European Theater, Office of the Theater Historian. Order of Battle of the United States Army, World War II, European Theater of Operations—Divisions. Paris, France, 1945.
- Kemp, Anthony. The Unknown Battle: Metz, 1944. New York, NY: Stein & Day, 1981. ISBN 0812825985.
- MacDonald, Charles B. The Last Offensive. Washington, DC: U.S. Army Center of Military History: 1993.
- MacDonald, Charles B.The Siegfried Line Campaign. Washington, DC: U.S. Army Center of Military History, 1993.
- Moore, Roy, Jr. Chariots of Iron: The 735th Tank Battalion (M), World War Two, Europe. Lopez Island, WA: Island Graphics and Advertising, 1991.
- Stanton, Shelby L. World War II Order of Battle: An Encyclopedic Reference to U.S. Army Ground Forces from Battalion through Division, 1939–1946. Novato, CA: Stackpole Books, 2006. ISBN 0811701573.
- U.S. Army Center of Military History. "World War II Divisional Combat Chronicles – 5th Infantry Division".
- U.S. Army Center of Military History. "World War II Divisional Combat Chronicles – 26th Infantry Division".
- U.S. Army Center of Military History. "World War II Divisional Combat Chronicles – 87th Infantry Division".
- Williams, Mary H. (ed.). Chronology 1941–1945. Washington, DC: U.S. Army Center of Military History: 1989
- Yeide, Harry. Steel Victory. New York, NY: Ballantine Books, 2003. ISBN 0891417826
- Zaloga, Steven J. US Tank and Tank Destroyer Battalions in the ETO 1944–1945. Botley, Oxford, UK: Osprey Publishing, 2005. ISBN 1841767980
