= Cactus Ridge =

Coordinates: 26.2700°N 127.7408°E

- Part of Battle of Okinawa, World War II, the Pacific War
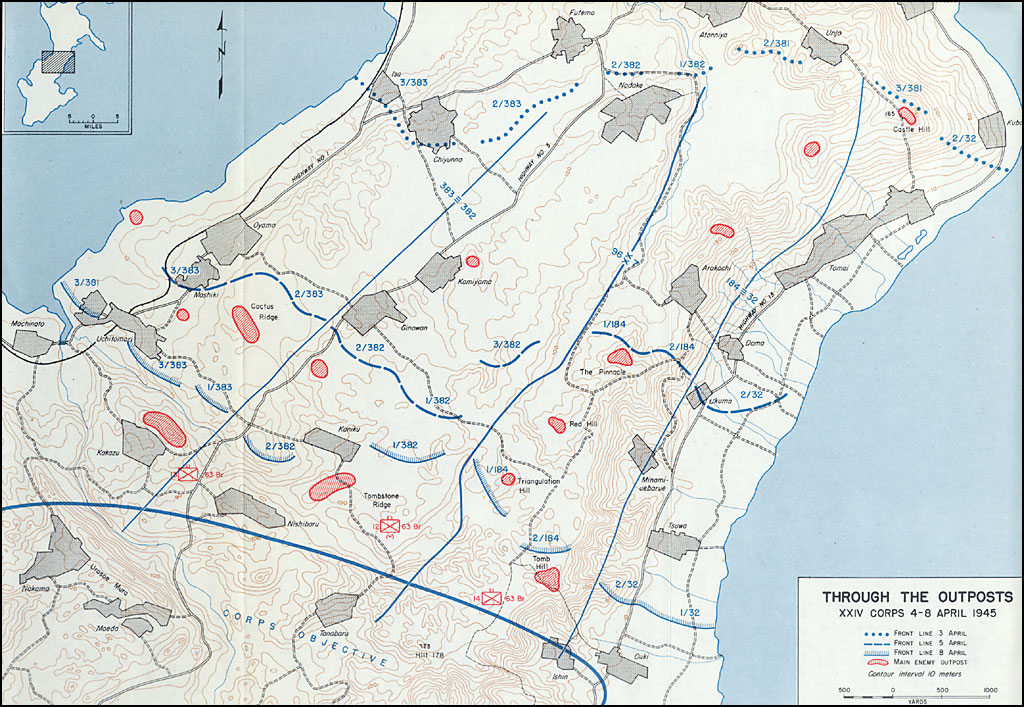
- Advance of American XXIV Corps showing approximate Japanese positions north of Shuri, April 1945
Date	April 4, 1945 – April 7, 1945
Location	Okinawa, Japan
Result	Allied victory

Belligerents
United States	Empire of Japan

Strength
96th Infantry Division	

In the Battle of Okinawa, Cactus Ridge was the name U.S. forces gave to a rise of land approximately 600 yards (550 m) southeast of Mashiki, Okinawa which commanded much of the ground between Uchitomari and Oyama, both of which lie along Highway No. 1. The defense of Cactus Ridge to the west, and The Pinnacle to the east, marked the start of resistance by Japanese land forces on Okinawa.

== Assault on Cactus Ridge ==
=== 4 April 1945 ===
As the US 96th Infantry Division advanced south along Okinawa's Highway 1 on 4 April, it came under increasing fire from the south and from the ridges on their left (east). Three medium tanks from the 763rd Tank Battalion were destroyed by a carefully sited and well-concealed 47 mm anti-tank gun. Firing twenty rounds, Japanese gunners set the three tanks afire. Japanese Army commanders later described this feat as an illustration of the effectiveness of 47 mm guns. "Great results," Japanese combat instructions stated, "can be obtained by concealing the guns and opening surprise fire on the tanks at close range."

=== 5 April 1945 ===
By 5 April, the 383rd Infantry Regiment indicated that its forward elements were receiving fire from 20 machine guns and from 15 to 20 mortars, besides artillery pieces. As movement progressed, it encountered a series of fortified positions, the approaches to which were often covered by minefields. Dislodging the Japanese from these positions required coordinated enveloping movements, and resulted in numerous American casualties.

On the afternoon of 5 April, well-camouflaged Japanese troops, supported by tanks, attacked elements of the 382nd Infantry Regiment, but were broken up by combined machine gun, mortar and artillery fire. Ultimately, the 382nd gained approximately 1,300 yards (1,200 m) of east–west ground by the evening of 5 April.

To the west, the 383rd was focusing its efforts on what came to be known as Cactus Ridge. The initial direct assault by a single infantry company, supported tanks, proved to be disastrous. Cactus Ridge was protected by a tank ditch, barbed wire, and a long mine field. When American tanks tried to pass through a gap in the minefield, they came under direct 47 mm fire. Two were hit and had to be abandoned. Heavy Japanese machine gun, rifle and mortar fire halted the assault and American forces were forced to withdraw.

=== 6–7 April 1945 ===
On the following day, 6 April, the fortified Japanese positions on Cactus Ridge continued to hold up the 383rd. Attempts were made to dislodge the defenders with an airstrike early on that morning, but subsequent troops assaulting the targeted positions found defensive enemy fire as intense as ever. American forces continued to make direct frontal assaults, through heavy Japanese mortar fire, against the ridge. Such assaults ultimately resulted in charging and reducing Japanese positions with hand grenades and small arms fire.

By the end of 6 April, these "Banzai" type charges by the 2nd Battalion enabled the 383rd to ultimately gain first the western half of Cactus Ridge. On 7 April, similar tactics by the 2nd Battalion allowed the 383rd to capture the rest of Cactus Ridge.

As a result of the offensive actions of 4–7 April, the 383d Infantry found itself assembled against the formidable Japanese positions on Kakazu Ridge.
