= 63rd Armor Regiment =

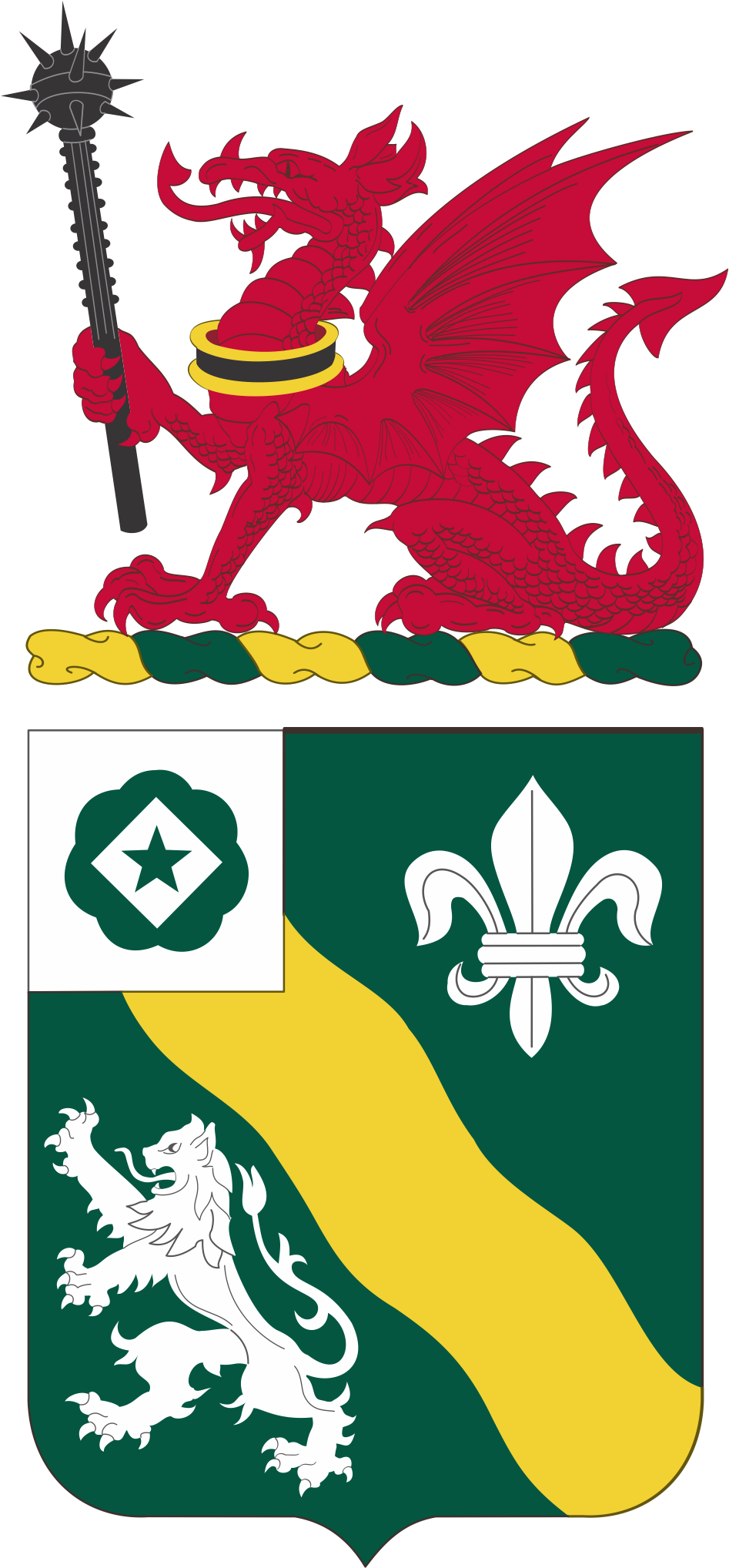
- Coat of Arms
- Active: 15 August 1942 – 26 October 1945 (as the 745th Tank Battalion); 1963–present (as parent regiment)
- Country: United States of America
- Branch: United States Army
- Type: Armor
- Role: Combined arms
- Size: Regiment
- Part of: 2nd Brigade Combat Team, 1st Infantry Division
- Garrison/HQ: Fort Riley, Kansas

Insignia
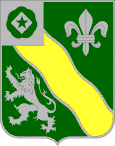
- Distinctive unit insignia

The 63rd Armor Regiment is an armored regiment of the United States Army formed in 1942.

== History ==
=== World War II ===
The current 63rd Armor Regiment traces back its history to the 745th Tank Battalion. The battalion was constituted on 3 May 1942 and activated on 15 August 1942 at Camp Bowie, Texas.

It was drawn from a core cadre of the 191st Tank Battalion alongside recruits trained at Camp Grant, Illinois. Initially designated as a medium tank battalion operating M3 Lee tanks, the unit transitioned to M4 Shermans during consecutive training cycles in Texas and Louisiana. On 2 August 1943, the battalion sailed from New York for final staging and training in England on the Queen Elizabeth, where it was reorganized as a standard separate tank battalion on 2 December 1943.

== Lineage ==
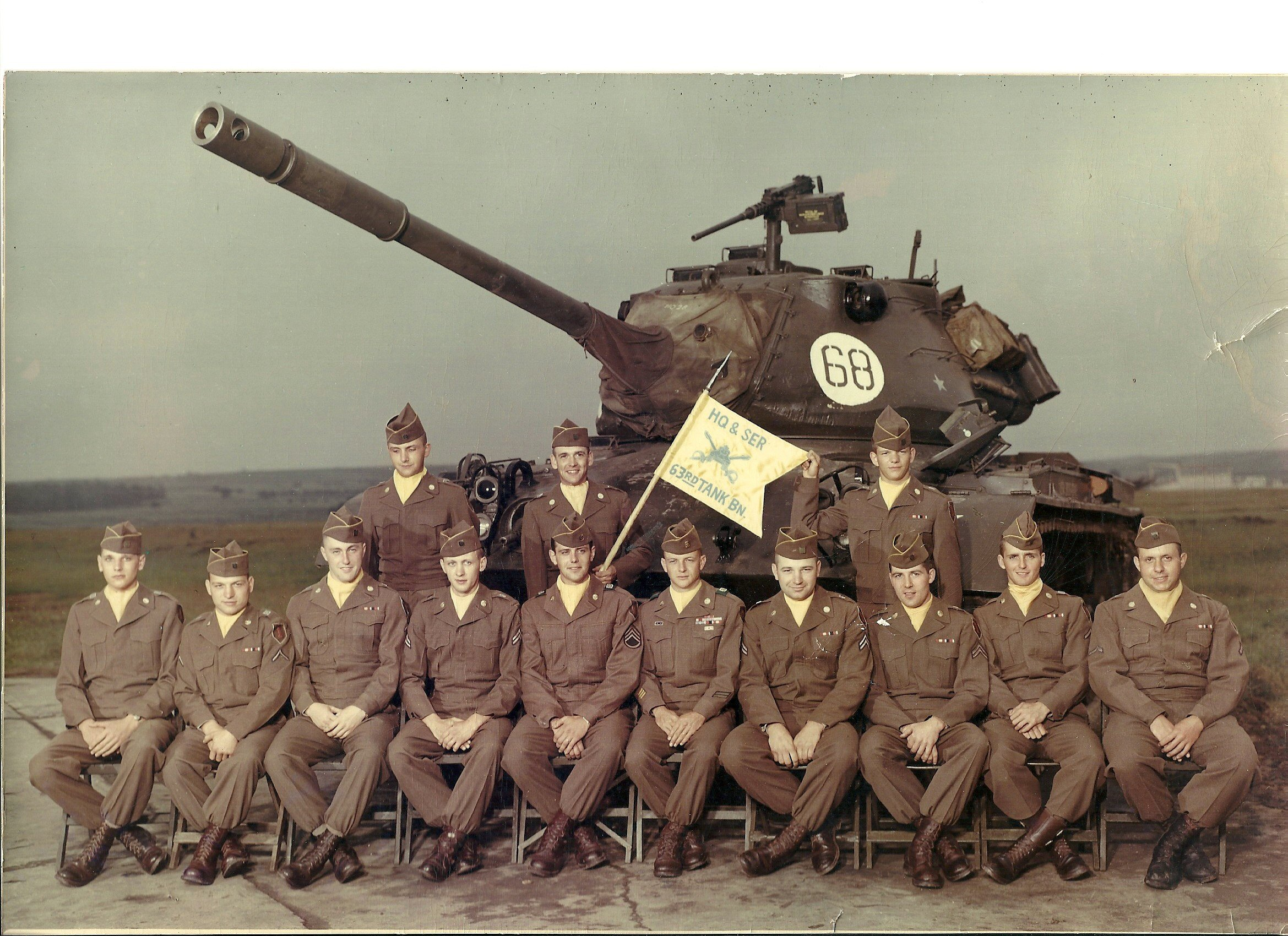
Men and M47 Patton of the then-63rd Tank Battalion, West Germany, c. 1952-1953

Constituted 3 May 1942 in the Army of the United States as the 745th Tank Battalion

Activated 15 August 1942 at Camp Bowie, Texas

Reorganized and redesignated 1 September 1942 as the 745th Tank Battalion, Medium

Reorganized and redesignated 2 December 1943 as the 745th Tank Battalion

Inactivated 27 October 1945 at Camp Kilmer, New Jersey

Redesignated 14 September 1948 as the 63d Heavy Tank Battalion, allotted to the Regular Army, and assigned to the 1st Infantry Division

Activated 10 October 1948 in Germany

Reorganized and redesignated 10 October 1950 as the 63d Tank Battalion

Inactivated 15 February 1957 at Fort Riley, Kansas, and relieved from assignment to the 1st Infantry Division

Reorganized and redesignated 25 January 1963 as the 63d Armor, a parent regiment under the Combat Arms Regimental System

Withdrawn 16 September 1989 from the Combat Arms Regimental System and reorganized under the United States Army Regimental System

2nd Battalion, 63rd Armor deployed in March 1996 from Rose Barracks in Vilseck, Germany to Camp Able Sentry, Skopje, Macedonia. There, they participated in a United Nations Preventive Deployment Force (UNPREDEP) to monitor Macedonia's border with Serbia. The battalion returned to Germany in September 1996, relieved by the 1st battalion 63rd Armor

1st and 2nd Battalion, 63rd Armor deployed in 1999 from Rose Barracks in Vilseck, Germany to Camp Able Sentry, Skopje, Macedonia with operations within Kosovo as part of Task Force Falcon. The battalion returned in June 2000.

2nd Battalion deployed from Rose Barracks in Vilseck, Germany to Iraq for Operation Iraqi Freedom II under the 1st Infantry Division from January 2004 till February 2005 at FOB Scunion near Baqubah, Iraq.

== Campaign participation credit ==
World War II

- Normandy (with arrowhead)
- Northern France
- Rhineland
- Ardennes-Alsace
- Central Europe

Modern

- Kosovo (2003)
- Operation Iraqi Freedom II (2003–5)

== Decorations ==
- Army Superior Unit Award, Streamer embroidered 1988
- Army Superior Unit Award, Streamer embroidered 1990
- Army Superior Unit Award, Streamer embroidered 1996–1997
- French Croix de Guerre with Palm, World War II, Streamer embroidered NORMANDY
- Belgian Fourragere 1940
  - Cited in the Order of the Day of the Belgian Army for action at Mons
  - Cited in the Order of the Day of the Belgian Army for action at Eupen-Malmedy

== See also ==
- List of armored and cavalry regiments of the United States Army
