= 778th Tank Battalion =

WW2 Army Unit

The 778th Tank Battalion was an independent tank battalion of the United States Army that served in the European Theatre of Operations during the Second World War. The battalion landed in Cherbourg, France on 15 September 1944, and joined the Third Army on 15 November 1944. They engaged in 176 consecutive days of front line combat.

== Inception and composition ==
Originally the 1st Battalion, 41st Armored Regiment, the 778th Tank Battalion was created following the 20 September 1943 decision by the US Army to streamline its armored divisions in order to create smaller, independent units which could be transferred between infantry divisions.

The Battalion consisted of six companies: Headquarters Company, combat echelon Companies A, B, C, and D, and Service Company. In total the battalion had about 80 tanks, several support vehicles, and rostered over 700 men and officers.

The Combat companies consisted of three platoons of five M4 Sherman tanks, initially armed with 75mm main cannons, although some later variants were armed with the higher-velocity 76mm cannons.

== Training ==
At Camp Barkley, Texas, the 778th Tank Battalion commenced training on individual tasks up through battalion maneuvers.

After training was completed, 778th shipped off to Camp Maxey, Texas in May 1944. There they trained alongside soldiers from the 99th Infantry Division.

In June 1944 the battalion traveled to Camp Howze, Texas to train with the 103rd Infantry Division. At the conclusion of training in July, 1944, they prepared for movements to the point of embarkation at Camp Myles Standish, Massachusetts.

The 778th departed the United States on 5 September 1944 aboard the SS Conte Grande (renamed USS Monticello AP-61 in 1942). Ten days later, they arrived at the port of Cherbourg, France. The Battalion was attached to the Ninth Army, and spent over a month in encamped at SE Valognes, France living in pup tents, while rain poured almost daily. On 6 November 1944 the 778th Tank Battalion, minus Able Company, which had earlier been ordered to transfer their tanks to another battalion, traveled through the heart of Paris toward their first combat engagement in Metz, France.

== Combat operations ==
The 778th Tank Battalion was reassigned as a task force of George S Patton's Third Army, and saw its first day of combat on 15 November 1944, participating in the Battle of Metz. For the next week the 778th engaged some of the most violent fighting in its history. It was a block by block fight alongside the 95th Infantry Division, against the 17th SS Panzergrenadier Division, to gain control of the towns and forts surrounding the fortress city of Metz, France. On 22 November 1944, the Germans in Metz surrendered to US forces.

With the defeat at Metz, the Germans retreated to the Saar River line. The next fight for the 778th was in Saarlautern, Germany (originally Saarlouis, the town was renamed from 1936-1945, and would resume being called Saarlouis after the war), a large city on the west bank of the Saar River. On the east side of the river were the adjoining cities of Saarlautern-Roden, Fraulautern, Ensdorf, and Lisidorf, and just beyond the cities, mountainous slopes rose up, covered with the Dragon's Teeth, mine fields, and concrete and steel pillboxes disguised as houses, all comprising the German West Wall, or Siegfried Line. The advance of the battalion was stalled out because of a shortage of supplies, so during the months of December, 1944 to February, 1945 the 778th tankers defended a bridgehead over the river, to prevent the Germans from pushing US forces back and creating a natural barrier. The Saarlautern battlefield was also characterized by aggressive patrolling and house-to-house fighting against the German 347th Volksgrenadier Division and 719th Volksgrenadier Division.

On 15 February 1945, 94th Infantry Division commander Major General Harry J. Maloney requested the aid of the 778th Tank Battalion in the division operations. The battalion was sent north to Apach, France, with the exception of Company C, which remained in Saarlautern. The objective of the 94th was the destruction of the Seigfried Switch line of defenses, which in that sector was defended by the 11th Panzer “Ghost” Division. While this operation was successful, muddy terrain caused one third of the engaged tanks to become bogged down in the mud. Around mid-March, Company C rejoined the 778th. The last action with the 94th division was the battle of Lampaden Ridge, where they battled elements of the 6th SS Mountain Division

The 778th was attached to the 26th Infantry "Yankee" Division in late March. By that time the Germans were falling back at a brisk pace, with the tankers pursuing them as quickly as they could. 778th Tank Battalion and 26th Infantry Division crossed the Rhine river at Oppenheim, Germany on 25 March. The month of April was spent going from town to town through Germany, often up to 20 miles per day, encountering only scarce organized resistance. By the end of April, together with the 26th Infantry Division, 5th Infantry Division, and 11th Armored Division, the battalion was positioned further east than all other Western Front Allied troops.

The 778th crossed the Austrian border on 3 May 1945, and then crossed into Czechoslovakia on 6 May. On 8 May, VE Day, the war ended in Europe, and the battalion commenced occupation duties. By the time hostilities had ceased, some of the tanks of the battalion had traveled over 3000 miles, and had taken part in the following European campaigns: Northern France, Ardennes-Alsace, Rhineland, and Central Europe. The 778th Tank Battalion had 43 men killed in action and nearly 250 men wounded in action. Three members were awarded the Distinguished Service Cross, 14 were awarded the Silver Star Medal, and 64 received the Bronze Star Medal.
