= 787th Tank Battalion =

American military unit

The 787th Tank Battalion was organized 14 January 1943 in the United States Army, 3rd Battalion, 16th Armored Regiment, within the 16th Armored Division. Six months later, almost to the day, 16 AR Rgt. was activated to train for combat service at Camp Chaffee, Arkansas 15 July 1943. On 10 September 1943 the regiment was relieved from division command of the 16 AD. The regiment was reorganized to battalion strength and redesignated 787th Tank Battalion. Becoming an independent tank battalion they, like most of their brother tank battalions, were assigned to infantry regiments/divisions where they were most needed throughout the war. So often was the case that, as records show, only one tank battalion stayed with the original assigned unit throughout the duration of WWII.
