= 745th Tank Battalion =

- Active: 15 August 1942 – 26 October 1945
- Country: United States
- Allegiance: Army
- Type: Tank/Armor
- Size: Battalion
- Part of: Independent Unit
- Motto: Our Tracks Lead To Victory
- Equipment: M4 Sherman; M5 Stuart
- Engagements: World War II: Normandy; Northern France; Rhineland; Battle of Hürtgen Forest; Battle of Aachen; Ardennes-Alsace; Central Europe

Insignia
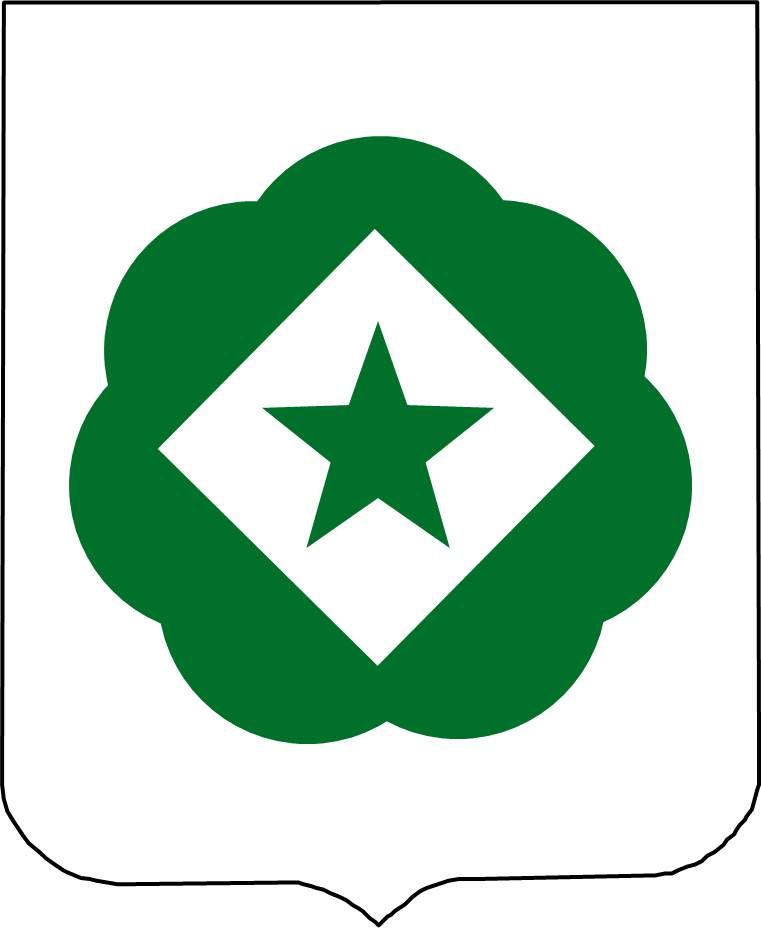
- Distinctive unit insignia

The 745th Tank Battalion was an independent tank battalion that participated in the European Theater of Operations (ETO) with the United States Army in World War II. It was one of five tank battalions (all independent) that landed in Normandy on D-Day (6 June 1944). The battalion participated in combat operations throughout northern Europe until V-E Day. Unlike many independent tank battalions, which were attached to different units over time, the 745th was attached to the 1st Infantry Division for the duration of its combat operations in the ETO. It was inactivated in October 1945.

== Activation and deployment ==
The 745th Tank Battalion was activated at Camp Bowie, Texas (near Brownwood) on 15 August 1942. Its initial cadre of officers and non-commissioned officers was drawn from the 191st Tank Battalion, with the remaining personnel drawn from the Army's induction system. It embarked for Europe aboard the Queen Elizabeth at New York on 19 August 1943 and arrived at Greenock, Scotland on 25 August. The battalion initially bivouacked near Swindon, Wiltshire, England, and began training for the amphibious assault that was sure to come. In December 1943, the battalion organized D Company, the battalion's light tank company.

== Invasion of France ==
While in England, the battalion was first attached to the 1st Infantry Division on 21 April 1944, an association which they would maintain throughout the war on the continent. The battalion moved from their marshalling area near Weymouth, England, to embarkation craft from 31 May – 2 June 1944. It would join the assault force on D-Day with Task Force "O" for Operation Neptune, with the Reconnaissance Platoon hitting Omaha Beach at about 1220 and B Company landing about 1500 on 6 June 1944. A and C Companies landed on 7 June. The other sections of the battalion joined the line tank companies on 27 June. The battalion was briefly relieved by the 735th Tank Battalion on 15 July and withdrawn from the line. After refit and reorganization, the battalion was reattached to 1st Infantry Division on 19 July. The elements of the battalion were attached as follows:

- Battalion headquarters and A Company – 16th Infantry Regiment
- B Company – 18th Infantry Regiment
- C Company – 26th Infantry Regiment

Tank platoons were regularly attached one per battalion within the infantry regiments. This task organization remained the same with little change throughout the rest of the war in Europe and permitted a level of mutual trust and understanding that enhanced the tank support of the infantry units.

The 745th Tank Battalion supported the 1st Infantry Division in the breakout from Normandy during Operation Cobra. The tankers observed the initial aerial bombardment on 25 July and began their assault to the south and west on the following day. The German lines began to crumble and, by 30 July, the battalion was pushing southeast. In the first week of August, near Mortain, with the 745th Tank battalion providing direct fire support, the 1st Infantry Division held the mouth of a narrow breach through which the now active Third Army of General George S. Patton began to pour eastward. After aiding in the encirclement of the Falaise Pocket, in which some 50,000 Germans were taken prisoner and another 10,000 were killed, the battalion raced northeast across France, at one point covering156 miles (251 km) in just over 24 hours.

As the battalion moved into southern Belgium at the beginning of September, the tanks played a key role in destroying elements of five German divisions retreating from the Belgian coast. Caught between the tanks of the 3rd Armored Division to the north (which had itself been cut off by the retreating Germans) and those of the 745th Tank Battalion supporting the 1st Infantry Division to the south, the German troops were mauled, and some 27,000 prisoners were taken.

== Siegfried Line ==
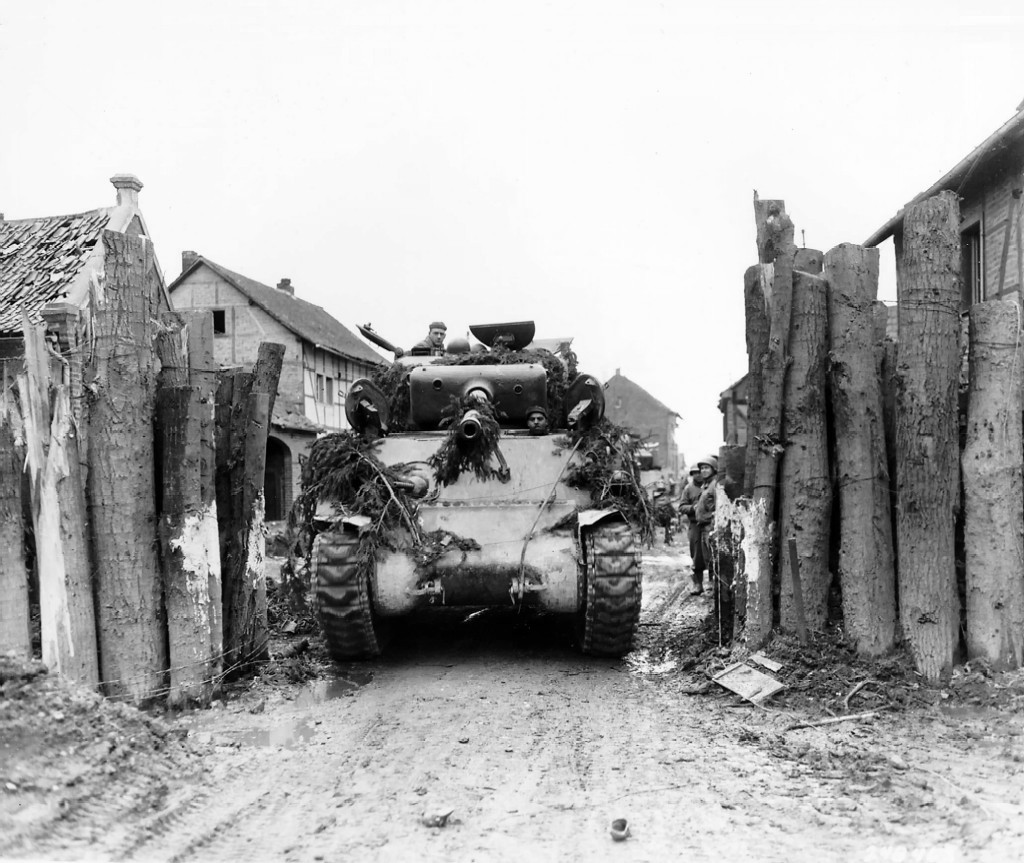
Tank of the 745th Tank Battalion, attached to the 1st Infantry Division, U.S. First Army, rolls through former German block in Gladbach, Germany.

Reaching the outskirts of Aachen, Germany, by 11 September 1944, the battalion was engaged in bitter fighting for most of the next three months in helping the 1st Infantry Division take Aachen and clear the Hürtgen Forest to the east of the city. Compounded by bad weather, fighting through the Hürtgen Forest was bitter and cost the battalion its highest casualties of the war.

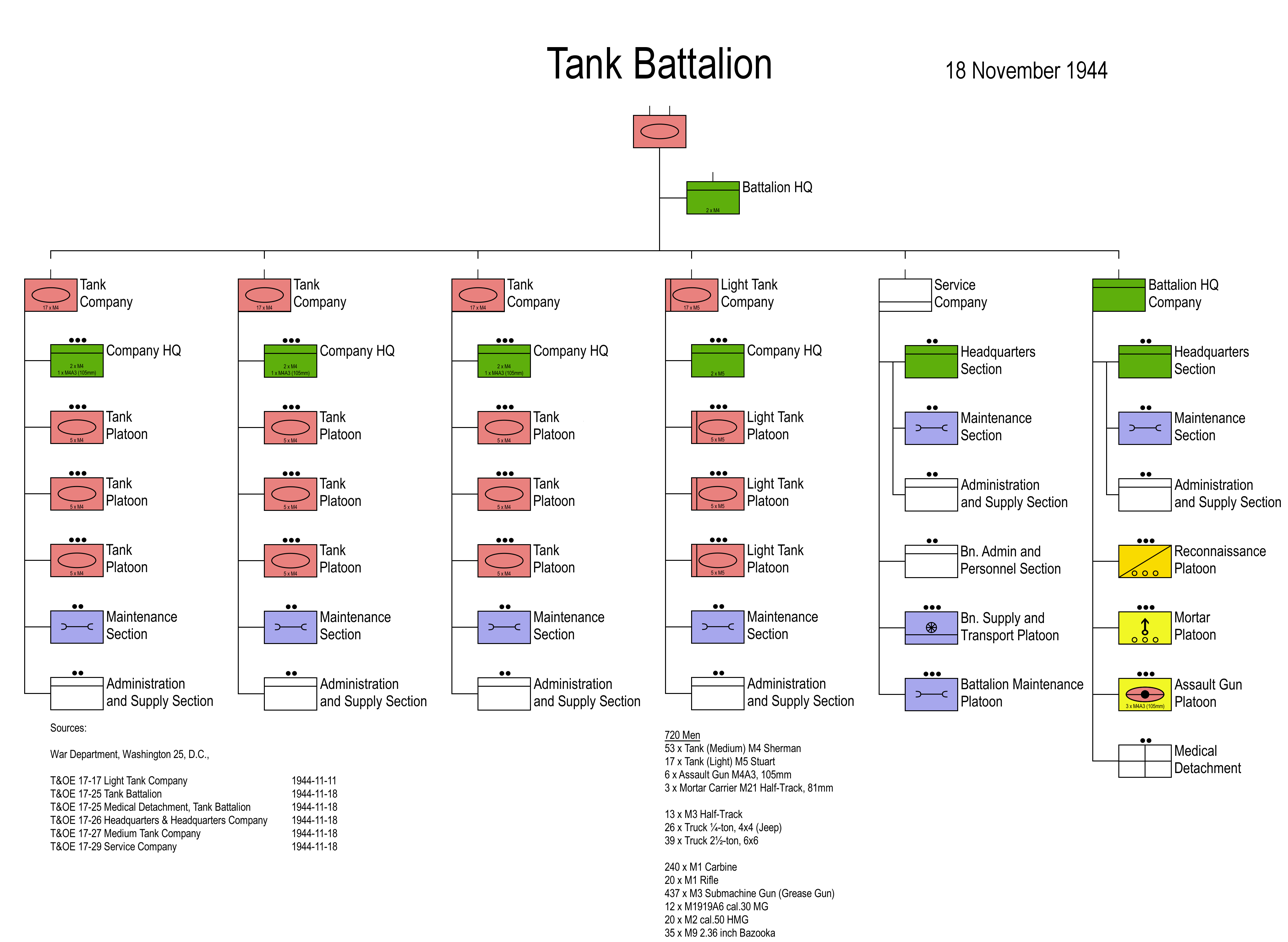
World War II Tank Battalion Structure - November 1944.

After the gruelling combat, the battalion was pulled out of the line along with the rest of the 1st Infantry Division to refit and reconstitute. However, it was pulled back into the vicinity of Hergenrath, Belgium, directly in the path of the attacking Germans when they launched their Ardennes Offensive (Battle of the Bulge) on 16 December. Here, the 745th had a rare encounter with concentrated German armor supported with troops and showed their own combat experience in helping the 1st Infantry Division hold the northern shoulder of the Bulge and prevent the Germans from exploiting the road network behind them. Both the division and the tank battalion stayed in the line until the first week of February 1945 and restored the front to near its original position. The battalion finally received a much-needed three-day rest on 10 February, before preparing for the final assault into Germany.

== V-E Day and post-war activities ==
The battalion jumped off on 25 February, reaching the Rhine at Bonn, then moving south with the 1st Infantry Division to cross the Rhine on 15 March and expand the bridgehead the 9th Armored Division had established at Remagen. They assisted the 1st Infantry Division in the envelopment of the Ruhr Pocket in late March, and the Harz Pocket in April. By this point, Germany was being overrun from east and west and organized resistance collapsed. The 745th raced through central Germany encountering only occasional but still deadly resistance until it found itself with the 1st Infantry Division near Cheb, Czech Republic, and D Company as far forward as Karlovy Vary by V-E Day.

The battalion withdrew back into Germany and briefly took up occupation duties centered on the historic town of Rothenburg ob der Tauber before redeploying to the United States. They arrived in New York on 25 October 1945.

The 745th Tank Battalion was inactivated at Camp Kilmer, New Jersey, on 26 October 1945. It is perpetuated by the 63rd Armor Regiment.

== Unit Awards ==
- French Fourragère: 1 January – 30 April 1943 and 6 June 1944, Department of the Army General Order 43 – 50.
- Belgian Fourragère: 3–5 September 1944 and 28–30 December 1944, Department of the Army General Order 43 – 50.
