= 717th Tank Battalion =

Independent tank battalion in the Second World War

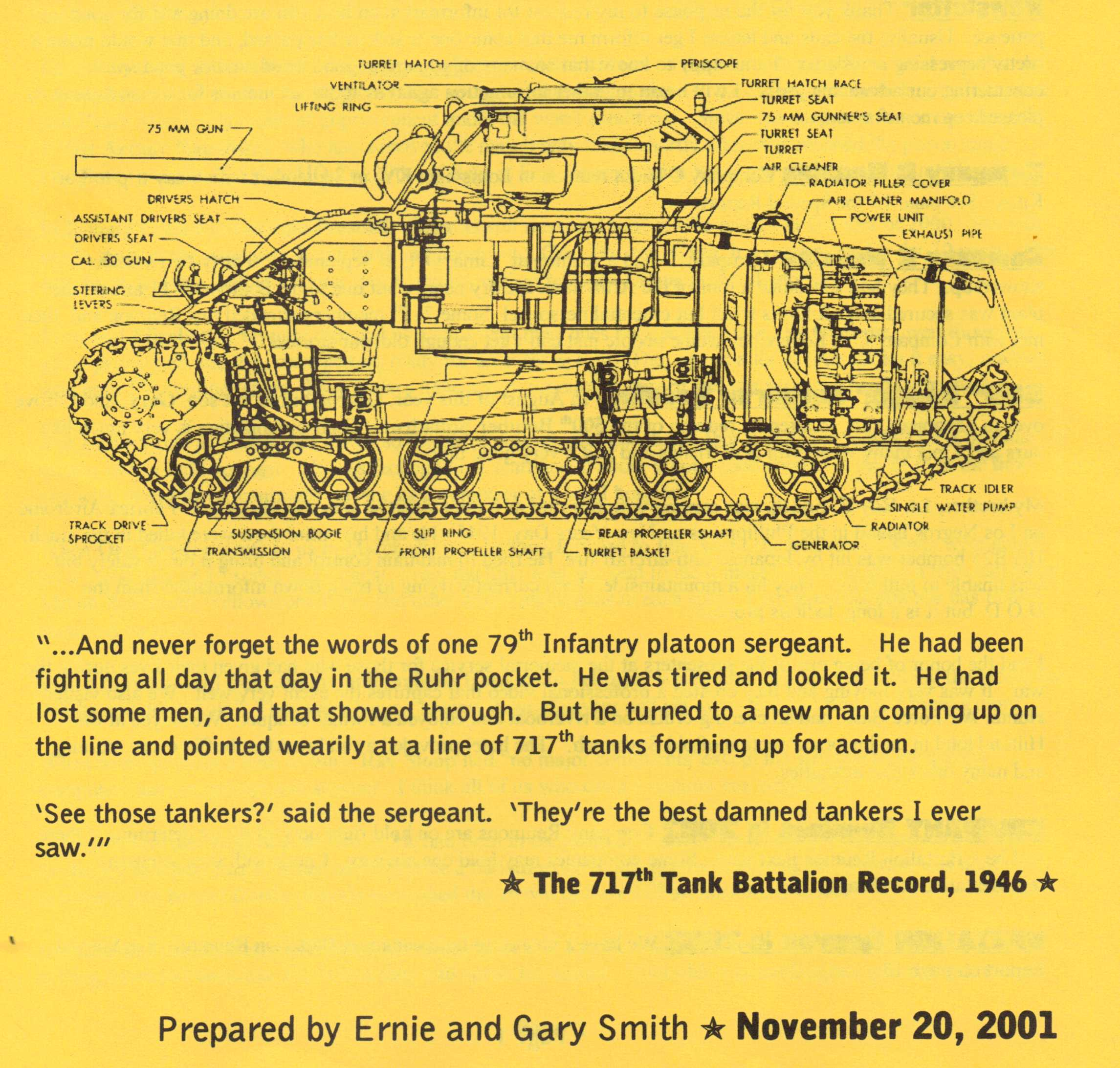
- Country: United States
- Branch: Army
- Type: Tank battalion
- Engagements: World War II

The 717th Tank Battalion was an Independent tank battalion which fought in the European Theater of Operations during World War II. They were attached to the 79th Infantry Division.

The Battalion entered the war against Germany during its final stages, with its first shot in combat during the crossing of the Rhine River on 24 March 1945.

== Gallery ==
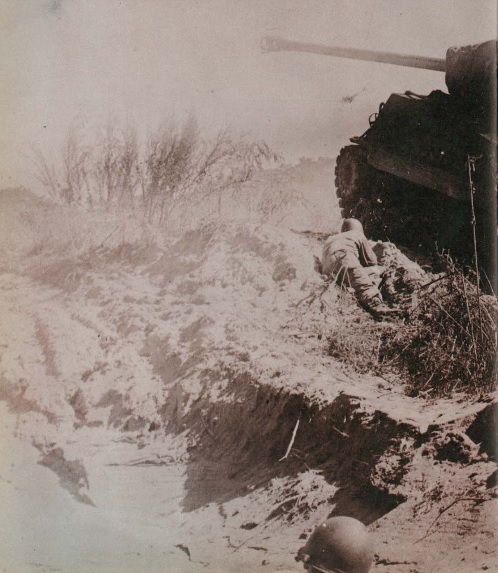
717th Tank Battalion supporting 79th Infantry Division soldiers near the Rhine river.

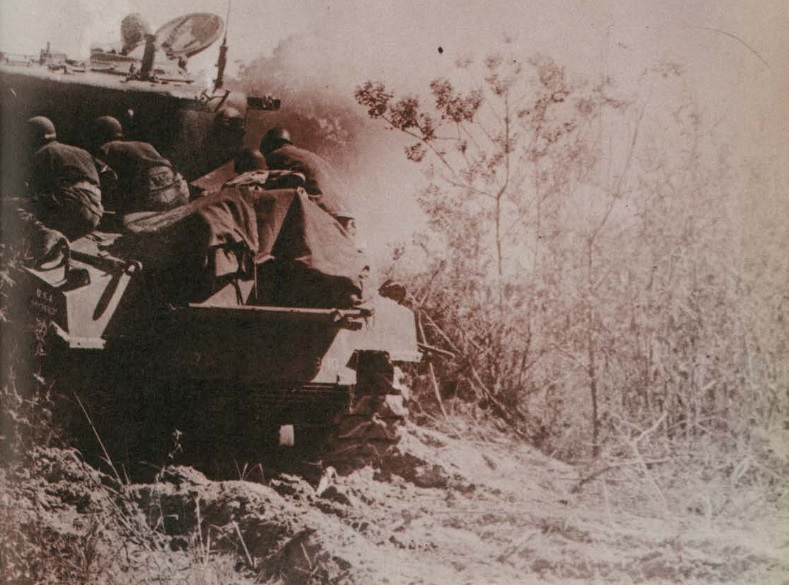
717th Tank Battalion carrying 79th Infantry Division soldiers into combat near the Rhine.
