= 746th Tank Battalion (United States) =

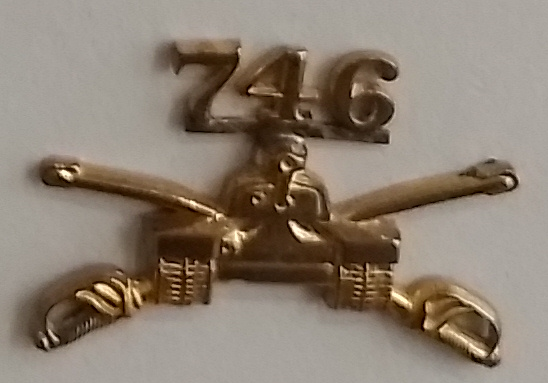
- Active: 27 April 1942 – 2 November 1945
- Country: United States
- Allegiance: United States Army
- Type: Tank/Armor
- Size: Battalion
- Part of: Independent Unit
- Motto: "Like Lightning We Strike"
- Equipment: M4 Sherman; M5 Stuart
- Engagements: World War II: Normandy with Arrowhead; Northern France; Rhineland; Ardennes-Alsace; Central Europe

The 746th Tank Battalion was an independent tank battalion that participated in the European Theater of Operations with the United States Army in World War II. It was one of five tank battalions (all independent) which landed in Normandy on D-Day (6 June 1944). The battalion participated in combat operations throughout northern Europe until V-E Day. It served primarily as an attachment to the 9th Infantry Division, but fought alongside numerous other units as well. It was inactivated in October 1945.

== Organization ==
The 746th Tank Battalion followed the standard organization of a U.S. medium tank battalion during World War II. It consisted of a Headquarters and Headquarters Company, Service Company, three medium tank companies (Companies A, B, and C) and a light tank company (Company D).

- The Headquarters Company included the battalion headquarters staff, both officers and enlisted men; an assault gun platoon, consisting of three Sherman tank variants armed with a 105 mm assault gun; a mortar platoon, equipped with three half-track mounted 81 mm mortars; a reconnaissance platoon with five quarter-ton “peeps” (jeeps); and the headquarters tank section consisting of two tanks for the battalion commander and operations officer. At the time the 746th went into action at Normandy, the assault gun platoon was still equipped with standard M4 Sherman tanks. They did not receive the 105 mm assault gun equipped tanks until the first week of July 1944. The assault gun platoon, along with the line company assault guns consolidated into a second platoon, was periodically attached to the division artillery as an ad hoc artillery battery to provide supporting fires to the division artillery. On one instance in October 1944, this reinforced platoon was even attached to the gun company of the Infantry Regimental Combat Team which the battalion was supporting.

- The Service Company included a headquarters section; a maintenance platoon; and a large battalion supply and transportation platoon, with over thirty trucks to provide logistics for the battalion.

- Companies A, B, C, and D – the tank line companies, both medium and light, all followed the same table of organization. Each company consisted of a headquarters section which, along with a small headquarters staff also included two tanks for the company commander and executive officer; three five-tank platoons; and, in the medium tank companies, a single 105 mm assault gun. The medium tank companies were equipped with M4 Sherman tanks, while the light tank company was equipped with M5 Stuart tanks. While attached to the 9th Infantry Division for combat operations, normally Company A was attached to the 47th Infantry Regiment, Company B was attached to the 60th Infantry regiment, and Company C was attached to the 39th Infantry Regiment. The authorized assault gun was a medium tank until the real 105 mm gun-equipped tanks arrived in Normandy the first week of July 1944. In August 1944, the company assault guns were consolidated into a second assault gun platoon under the control of the battalion assault gun platoon leader and attached to the division artillery for general fire support. In October 1944, the assault guns were consolidated with the headquarters assault gun platoon and formed into three two-gun sections that supported each of the battalions of the Infantry regimental Combat Team which the battalion was supporting. All four companies had their own maintenance section which included a M32 tank recovery vehicle, built on a Sherman chassis. Because the Stuart carried a 4-man crew versus a 5-man crew on the Sherman, it had a somewhat smaller personnel strength than then medium tank companies.

== History ==
=== Activation and deployment ===
The 746th Tank Battalion was activated at Camp Rucker, Alabama on 20 August 1942 as the 746th Tank Battalion (Medium), drawing its initial cadre of officers from the 760th Tank Battalion and an additional six officers and 135 enlisted men from the 70th Tank Battalion. The battalion filled out its personnel strength and trained at Camp Rucker until October 1943, when it relocated to Camp Pickett, Virginia for advanced training. Soon after the move to Camp Pickett, on 22 October 1943, the unit was redesignated as the 746th Tank Battalion and adopted the organization in which it would fight throughout the European Campaign. In January 1944 it moved from Camp Pickett to the embarkation point at Camp Shanks, New York for deployment to Europe.

The 746th embarked in New York on 29 January 1944 aboard the RMS Aquitania and arrived at Gourock, Scotland on 9 February 1944. Upon arrival in Great Britain, it shipped by train to Fairford, England. It then moved in March 1944 to Castlemartin Range, Pembrokeshire, South Wales, where it conducted live fire and maneuver training at the company level and below. Following live fire and tactical training, the battalion moved to the south of England where they participated in training for the amphibious assaults in Normandy. It was during this time that the 746th was assigned to support the 4th Infantry Division for the invasion. They participated in Exercise Beaver without incident and although they also took part in Exercise Tiger, the unit suffered no casualties as a result of the German raid in the early morning darkness of 28 April.

By May, the 746th Tank Battalion marshaled in their staging area at Lupton Park, Brixham and from 31 May to 2 June loaded aboard LCT’s at Dartmouth and joined the invasion armada on 3 June.

=== D-Day Landings and Normandy ===
Although not one of the three tank battalions that would land with the first assault wave on D-Day, the medium tank companies and the command elements of the battalion nevertheless landed ashore on Utah Beach attached to the 4th Infantry Division before noon of 6 June. The tanks’ landing craft landed about 2,000 yards from their planned locations, but once ashore the battalion immediately went into combat and was parceled out to the various infantry units they were to support. The battalion headquarters remained attached to the 4th Infantry Division. Company A(-) linked up with elements of the 101st Airborne Division; Company B with the 12th Infantry Regiment of the 4th Infantry Division; and Company C was attached to the 82nd Airborne Division at Ste.-Mère-Église. One platoon of Company A was attached to the 3rd Battalion, 22nd Infantry Regiment, 4th Infantry Division. Company D, along with the reconnaissance and mortar platoons and selected support elements landed ashore in the early morning hours of 7 June. Company D was initially placed in 4th Infantry Division reserve. On 7 June, Company B formed the core of a 746th task force that was crucial in blunting a German assault gun attack on Ste.-Mere-Église that was the first armor-on-armor battle in France and which caused the German commander in the area to switch from trying to eliminate the beachhead to trying to contain it. In supporting these diverse elements, which landed both in airborne and beach assaults, the 746th played a crucial role in consolidating the elements of these three divisions into a coherent organized beachhead.

The companies reverted to battalion control on 9–10 June. The tankers had found the first days in combat in France very trying. Despite training with the infantry units for the landings, neither had conducted any real training working with the other in combat operations. Lessons were learned the hard way as infantry and armor worked together against tough German resistance. On 11 June, the battalion was relieved from the 4th Infantry Division and attached to the 90th Infantry Division. The battalion approached this relationship with the untried 90th with trepidation, observing what they thought undisciplined behavior in their assembly areas. In operations with the 90th Infantry Division, the tankers noted the hesitation in the division leadership and high casualties suffered by the infantry that they were supporting. However, by 16 June 1944, the last 746th unit was detached from the 90th Infantry Division. It was at this time also that the remainder of the battalion which had not landed on 6–7 June, consisting mainly of the service company and other support elements of the headquarters company dubbed the “Battalion Residue”, departed Bournemouth on 16 June, landed on Utah Beach the following day and linked-up with the battalion soon thereafter.

Through the remainder of June 1944, the 746th was instrumental in the drive up the Cotentin Peninsula and the liberation of Cherbourg-en-Cotentin while still attached to diverse units. Company A was detached from the 82nd Airborne Division on 17 June and attached to the 79th Infantry Division, with whom they fought until 26 June, when Cherbourg was reduced. The battalion headquarters was attached to the 9th Infantry Division on 17 June. Company B was likewise attached to elements of the 9th Infantry Division during the drive on Cherbourg. During this period, a platoon of Company B was tasked to dash to the western coast of the peninsula and on 18 June, upon reaching the west coast at Barneville-Carteret, cut off all German forces on the peninsula. Company C, which had been reduced to about 30% strength during the first week in action, spent the next two weeks reconstituting and training new replacements, while Company D, equipped only with light tanks, was in division reserve and assigned security missions within the 9th Infantry Division's area. This initial relationship with the 9th Infantry Division was to become a habitual relationship, and the battalion would maintain a close operating relationship with it for most of the remainder of the war in Europe.

The battalion spent the first four days of July refitting from the Cherbourg campaign. On 5 July, the 746th Tank Battalion was attached to the 83rd Infantry Division to help repel a strong counterattack from the German 6th Parachute Regiment toward Carentan in an effort to cut off the VII Corps from their supply lines to the landing beaches. The M5 Stuart tanks of Company D were considered too light to be able to operate independently in the heavily compartmented bocage in Normandy, so the battalion commander decided to break the company up and attach one platoon from Company D to each of the medium tank companies, ostensibly as flank security. However, even in that role, the light tanks were considered ineffective. Although remaining attached to the medium tank companies, they were used to maintain security along the lines of communication, where bypassed and infiltrating German troops continued to pose a real threat; to protect the infantry regimental and battalion command posts; and as a tactical reserve. The medium tank companies encountered fierce resistance from the Germans as the 83rd fought to contain the German counterattack. They suffered their heaviest casualties of the war so far, with 75 killed, wounded and missing during the ten days they were attached to the 83rd Infantry Division.

Once the German penetration had been contained, on 15 July, the battalion was given a brief pause to refit before rejoining the 9th Infantry Division on 17 July to prepare for Operation Cobra, the Allied offensive to break out of Normandy. They had advanced to the vicinity of the Lozon River west of St.-Lô by 25 July, when the Allied carpet bombing of German positions south of the St.-Lô-Périers road marked the beginning of Operation Cobra. The battalion suffered relatively light casualties from the “short” bombs which landed among the American troops, and moved out immediately after the bombing, with the medium tank companies attached to the three regimental combat teams of the 9th Infantry Division. During the next several days the tankers encountered stiff but increasingly disorganized and isolated resistance and advanced to the environs west of Marigny by 29 July. By 29 July, although German resistance in the sector began to crumble, the battalion had suffered another 55 casualties and was pulled from the line to refit. With such heavy losses in July, Company D was stripped of qualified tankers to fill out the crews in the medium tank companies.

=== Breakout and pursuit across Northern France ===
The 746th Tank Battalion went back into action on 1 August east of Villedieu-les-Poêles to help exploit the breakthrough in the German defenses. Initially the 9th Infantry Division made good progress, covering 10 miles in two days (an advance unheard of in the bocage), but German efforts to restore stability to their front caused resistance to stiffen. Beginning on 4 August, the medium tank companies maneuvered with their infantry regimental combat teams in an effort to dislodge the Germans located between Chérencé-le-Roussel and Gathemo. Instead, beginning in the early morning of 7 August, they found themselves in the path of Operation Lüttich, a corps-size German armor offensive to split the First and Third Armies and relieve German forces cut off at Avranches. The attack was blunted within a day, but fighting continued until the German leadership called off the attack on 11 August. Despite the size of the forces involved on both sides, the attack devolved into a melee of fierce but disjointed small unit actions. After the tactical situation had been restored, the battalion was once again given a brief opportunity to rest and refit.

On 18 August, the battalion once again was on the move, supporting the division in helping to protect the southern shoulder of the Falaise pocket. Soon thereafter, German resistance in western France collapsed, and the tankers road-marched in battalion formation due east across France and reached Bruyères-le-Châtel by early morning on 26 August. The companies were again attached to the regimental combat teams of the 9th Infantry Division and crossed the Seine the following day north of Ponthierry and at Melun at crossings established by the 7th Armored Division. As the battalion continued to pursue the Germans north and east of the Seine, Company D was reconstituted and attached to the division reconnaissance troop to screen the division front as they crossed the Aisne River between Reims and Laon. The battalion supported the division as it continued to moved first north in support of the encirclement of Mons, crossing into Belgium on 2 September between Fourmies and Chimay. Then turning northeast, the battalion advanced about 30 km per day, encountering continued sporadic resistance in the form of mined roadblocks, demolished bridges and mobile strong points. The tankers followed a route south of Charleroi, Namur and Liège to Eupen and crossed into Germany near Roetgen on 14 September 1944.

=== Siegfried Line and Battle of the Bulge ===
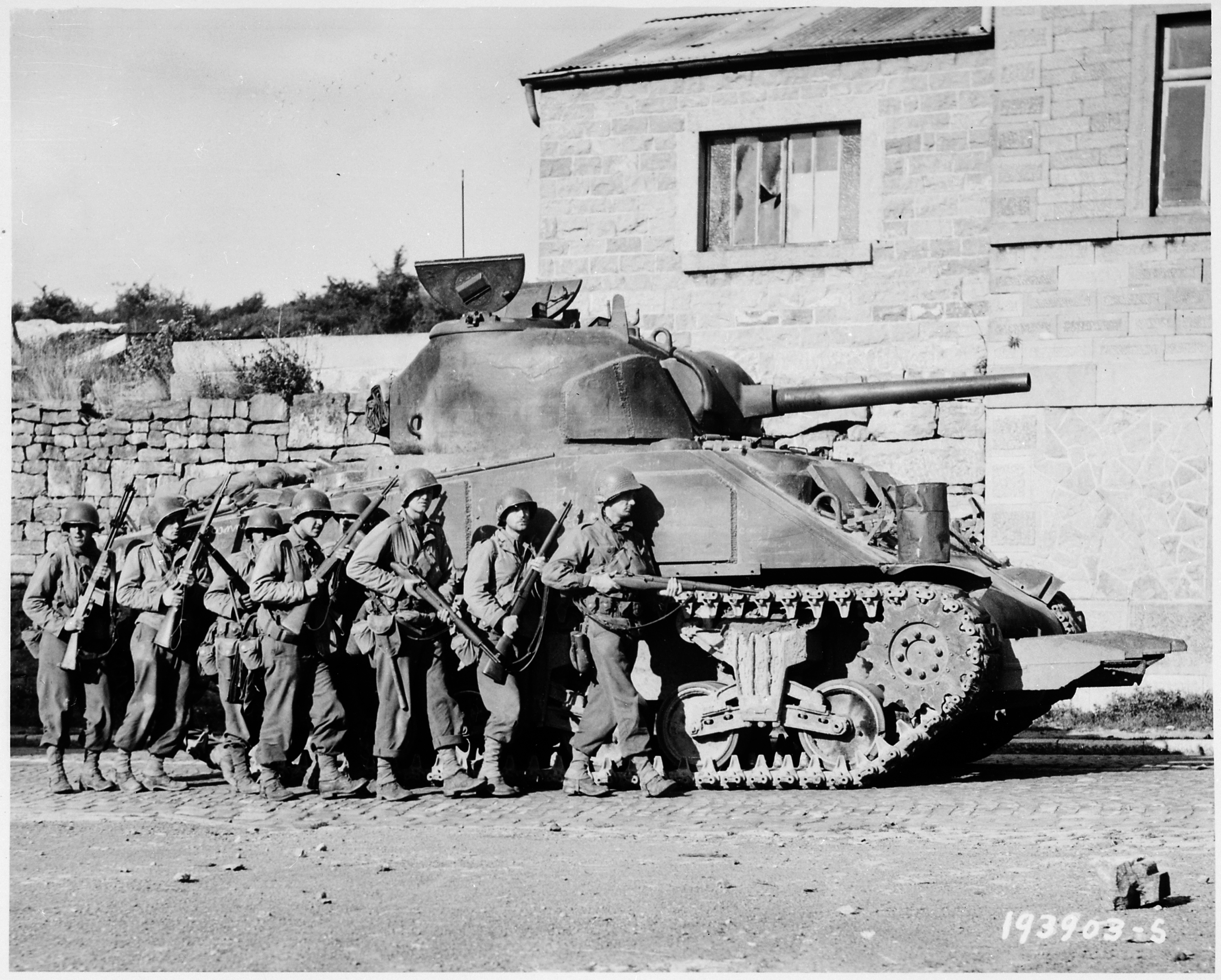
A "Rhino" M4 Sherman of the 746th Tank Battalion provides cover for soldiers of the 39th Infantry Regiment as they advance into a Belgian town, 9 September 1944.

As they crossed into Germany, the 746th encountered its first organized resistance since breaking out of Normandy when they began to probe the Western Wall (Siegfried Line). Several techniques were experimented with to reduce the German bunkers, with combined infantry-armor attacks behind smoke screens showing the most success. As the pace of the advance slowed down, the battalion began to receive 38-ton heavy Sherman tanks (M4A3E2). The tankers were heartened to find that the new “heavies” were much more resistant to Panzerfaust attack.

Breaking through the first band of the Western Wall by late September 1944, the 9th Infantry Division, and along with it the 746th Tank Battalion, were the first of numerous American units to find themselves in the dark, disorienting woods and hilly terrain of the Hürtgen Forest. They were attempting to follow up on the penetration to the second belt of the Western Wall made in the vicinity of Schevenhütte in which Company A participated. In particular, companies B and C saw heavy action in the Forest until the battalion withdrew from the line on 28 October to Bütgenbach, Belgium, near the village of Weywertz. Company A remained in support of the 47 Infantry Regiment, which had been attached to the 3rd Armored Division in order to sustain its defense of the gains made at Schevenhütte.

After a short break to refit and integrate new replacements, the tank companies went back into combat in Büllingen, Belgium, near the twin villages of Rocherath and Krinkelt, on 5 November, except Company A, which continued their determined defense of Schevenhütte. The 9th Infantry Division and with it the 746th Tank Battalion came out of the line on 15 November to become First Army reserve. In the meantime, Company A and the 47th Infantry Regiment had been attached instead to the 1st Infantry Division on 11 November and on 18 November went over to the offensive toward Eschweiler and Weisweiler. They were attached once again to the 3rd Armored Division on 24 November. It wasn't until 30 November that the 47th Infantry Regiment reverted to 9th Infantry Division control and Company A finally rejoined the rest of the battalion, after more than 90 days of nearly continuous and frequently intense combat.

On 5–7 December, the battalion supported the 9th Infantry Division's move back into the line to relieve the 1st Infantry Division in the vicinity of Eschweiler-Nothberg. After conducting reconnaissance, the battalion supported the division's assault following the axis Jüngersdorf-Düren. The forces reached the west bank of the Roer River and 746th tankers conducted reconnaissance across the river for possible crossing sites by 16 December 1944.

The 746th was organized to support an attack by the 9th Infantry Division on 17 December to consolidate their positions west of the Roer River. However, due to the German counteroffensive in the Ardennes just to the south that began the day before, the scope of the attack was reduced while the division reacted to this new threat. Company A joined the 47th Infantry Regiment when it was detached from the division and attached directly to V Corps to reinforce the northern shoulder of the American lines. Within their own sector, German paratroopers dropped into the rear of the combat units on the night of 16–17 December. By 18 December the division's advance toward the Roer was halted in order to respond to the German offensive. The bulk of the battalion joined the division as they moved southeast to the vicinity of Sourbrodt, Belgium. Company B remained with the 60th Infantry Regiment as they were attached to the 104th Infantry Division to hold the hard-won ground around Eschweiler and Düren. The 60th and Company B rejoined the division on 24 December.

The battalion remained in defensive positions to the southeast of Eupen throughout the end of December 1944 and most of January 1945, with limited localized offensive operations while the front to the 9th Infantry Division's south was stabilized and restored after the German counteroffensive. The battalion also used this period to winterize their vehicles and to train and prepare for the impending resumption of offensive operations.

=== Advance into Germany ===
On 30 January, the division recommenced offensive operations, driving SE from Monschau. By 4 February, they had finally reached the Roer River. The tankers prepared to support the 9th Infantry Division's planned crossing of the Roer in the vicinity of Urfttal, and Company B supported the 60th Infantry Regiment as they aided the 78th Infantry Division in taking the Schwammenauel Dam on 11 February. The discharge gates on the dam were demolished as the Americans approached and operations to the east of the Roer had to wait until the waters downstream subsided. Ultimately, the 746th supported the 9th Division's crossing of the Roer in the 1st Infantry Division sector at Winden on 26 February, and attacked the German flank by advancing south toward Nideggen and Thum.

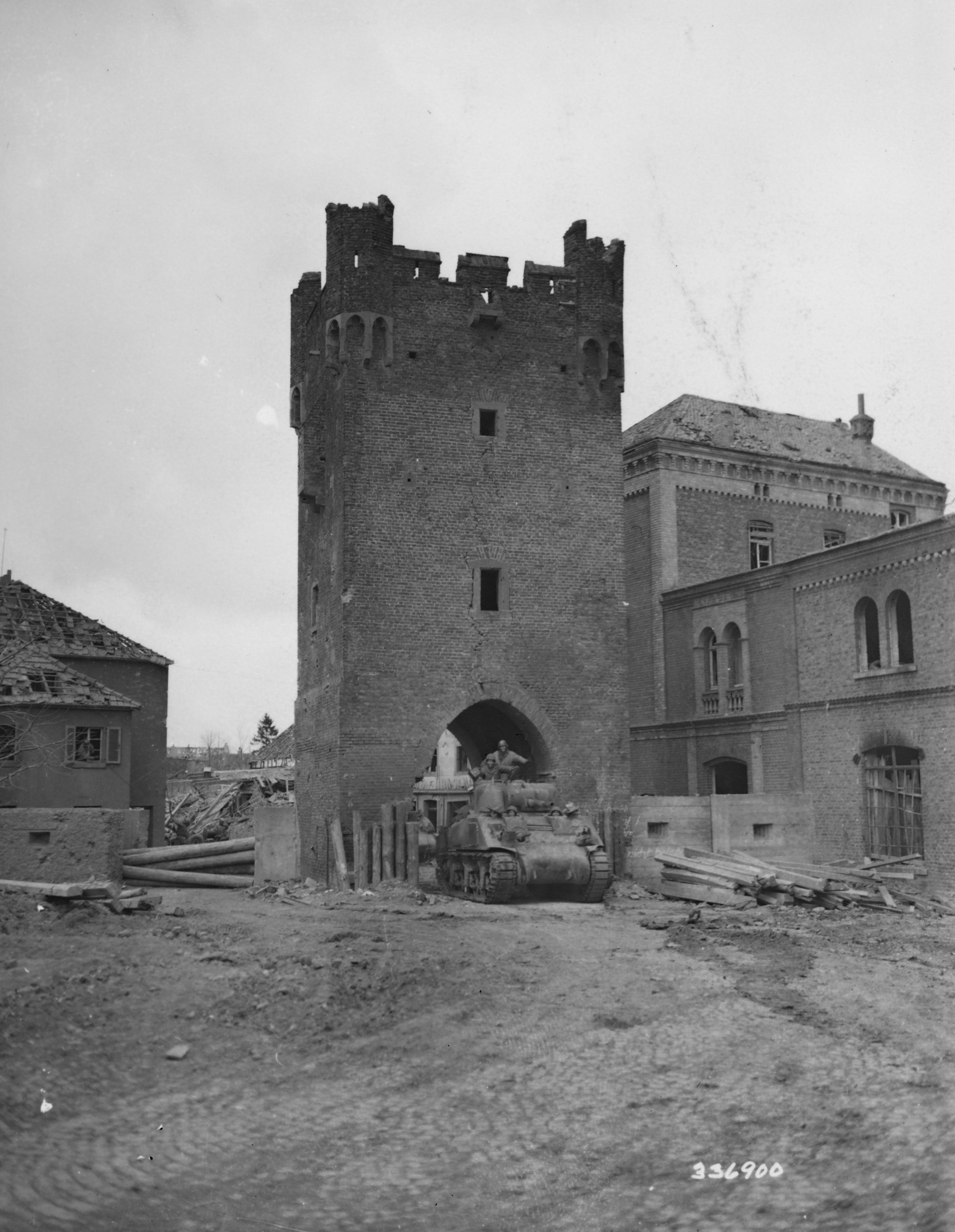
A tank of the 746th Tank Battalion goes through the entrance to the "Walled City" of Zülpich, Germany after the town's capture. 3 March 1945.

Though they had crossed the Roer, German resistance had not yet broken. German positions continued to offer excellent visibility for artillery fires, and assault guns and dug-in infantry created dangerous strong points that had to be reduced one at the time. In contrast to most operations to date, the 746th and the infantry they supported conducted many of their operations at night in order to avoid German artillery spotters and to surprise the defenders. In their close cooperation with the infantry, the tankers now demonstrated they were an experienced veteran combat unit. The 9th Infantry Division reached the Rhine River by 7 March. Companies A and B, crossed the Rhine with their infantry regiments on the bridge at Remagen on 8 March, and immediately went into action to defend and expand the bridgehead on the east bank of the river. As a result of this action, Company A was awarded the Presidential Unit Citation. Company C, supporting the 39th Infantry Regiment in division reserve did not cross until 10 March. Fighting was so intense during this period that two platoons of Company D were broken up to man tanks for the medium tank companies. These crewmen were in turn replaced in Company D with infantry replacements who immediately began training as tankers.

The 9th Infantry Division as well as other units pressed across the Rhine into the bridgehead gradually expanded their perimeter until German resistance collapsed on 25 March. With infantry mounted aboard the tanks or following in trucks, the 746th tankers moved about 110 km east to positions in Marburg to north of Giessen by 30 March. At this point, the 9th Infantry Division was pulled from this headlong eastward advance and attached to III Corps to move north to prevent an expected German breakout from the eastern perimeter of the Ruhr pocket in the vicinity of Winterburg.

By mid-April, the 9th Infantry Division was effectively squeezed out of the shrinking cordon around the Ruhr Pocket and plans were made to pull the 746th out of the line to refit the worn tanks. Only Company D was able to move to a centralized assembly area, and ten of its tanks dropped out of the road march en route. In the meantime, the division received orders reattaching them to VII Corps and ordering them east to catch up with the advancing front and the medium tank companies had to move out without benefit of refitting. As a result, 15 of the Shermans fell out due to track and suspension failure during the 250 km road march to Nordhausen on 13–14 April. Initially, the tank companies supported the infantry regiments in reducing the Harz Pocket, and the tankers reported resistance ranging from light small arms fire to heavy concentrations of tank gun and artillery fire, depending on the situation. German resistance, however, had so completely collapsed that the tankers’ mission was to assist the infantry in collecting bypassed German troops moving east, identify and guard key installations in the southern Harz Mountains, and to control civilians, displaced persons, and freed Allied prisoners of war. On 23–24 April, the battalion moved to Könnern and took up similar missions in and around this town. These missions quickly became the routine and the battalion transitioned from war to peace, which became official on 8 May 1945.

=== Post war ===
After their occupation duties in the vicinity of Könnern, the 746th road marched to Ingolstadt from 13 to 15 May. They set up in Fort von der Tann at Gaimersheim, on the north side of Ingolstadt, to carry out occupation duties, mainly guarding American military assets, and guarding prisoner of war and displaced person camps. The routine of occupation was briefly interrupted on 16 June, when ordnance in the old Bavarian fort was inadvertently set off in their bivouac area, resulting in an explosion and fire that lasted two days, but which fortunately caused no casualties.

On 10 July 1945, the battalion was relieved of assignment to the 9th Infantry Division. By 18 September 1945, the battalion was relieved of its occupation duties and prepared to return to the United States. It arrived in New York on 25 October. The 746th Tank Battalion was inactivated at Camp Shanks, New York, on 26 October 1945.

== Unit awards and decorations ==
- Company A, Presidential Unit Citation: 8–19 March 1945, War Department General Order 65–46.
- Meritorious Unit Commendation: 6 June – 31 August 1944, General Order 103, Headquarters, 9th Infantry Division, 26 June 1945.
- Belgian Fourragère: 3–13 September 1944 and 20 December 1944 – 26 January 1945, Department of the Army General Order 43–50

== Bibliography ==
- Blanchard, W.J., Jr. Our Liberators: The Combat History of the 746th Tank Battalion during World War II. Tucson, AZ: Fenestra Books, 2007. ISBN 9781587368097.
- Blumenson, Martin. Breakout and Pursuit. Washington, D.C.: U.S. Army Center of Military History: 1993.
- Combined Arms Research Library (CARL) Digital Collection.

--"After Action Report, 746th Tank Battalion June – December 1944".
--"After Action Report, 746th Tank Battalion January - February 1945".
--"After Action Report, 746th Tank Battalion March – May 1945".
--"Armor in Operation Neptune (establishment of the Normandy Beachhead".

- Harrison, Gordon A. Cross-Channel Attack. Washington, D.C.: U.S. Army Center of Military History: 1993.
- Headquarters, Department of the Army. DA Pam 672-1 Unit Citation and Campaign Participation Credit Register. Washington, D.C.: U.S. Army, July 1961. https://web.archive.org/web/20090811141647/http://www.army.mil/usapa/epubs/pdf/p672_1.pdf
- Headquarters, United States Forces European Theater, Office of the Theater Historian. Order of Battle of the United States Army, World War II, European Theater of Operations—Divisions. Paris, France, 1945.
- Sawicki, James A. Tank Battalions of the U.S. Army. Dumfries, Va.: Wyvern Press, 1983. ISBN 0960240454
- MacDonald, Charles B.

--"The Last Offensive”. Washington, D.C.: U.S. Army Center of Military History: 1993.
--"The Siegfried Line Campaign”. Washington, D.C.: U.S. Army Center of Military History: 1993.

- Stanton, Shelby L. World War II Order of Battle: An Encyclopedic Reference to U.S. Army Ground Forces from Battalion through Division, 1939–1946. Novato, Calif.: Stackpole Books, 2006. ISBN 0811701573.
- U.S. Army Center of Military History. "World War II Divisional Combat Chronicles – 9th Infantry Division".
- Williams, Mary H. (ed.). Chronology 1941–1945. Washington, D.C.: U.S. Army Center of Military History: 1989
- Yeide, Harry. Steel Victory. New York, NY: Ballantine Books, 2003. ISBN 0891417826
- Zaloga, Steven J. US Tank and Tank Destroyer Battalions in the ETO 1944–1945. Botley, Oxford, UK: Osprey Publishing, 2005. ISBN 1841767980
