= 754th Tank Battalion =

Military unit

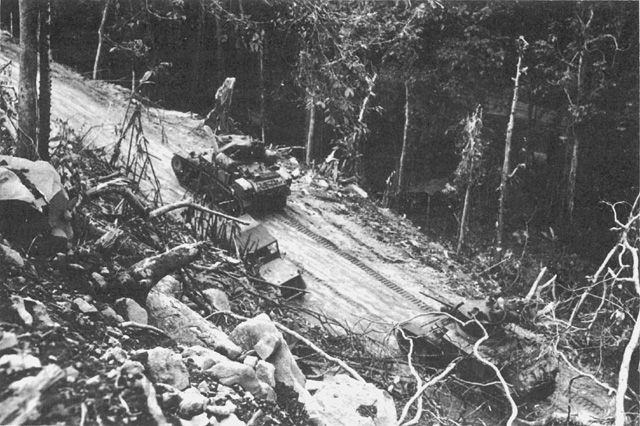
Two light tanks from the 754th during the March 1944 Japanese Bougainville counterattack.

The 754th Tank Battalion was an independent tank battalion that participated in the Pacific Theater of Operations with the United States Army in World War II.
