= 752nd Tank Battalion =

US military unit in World War II

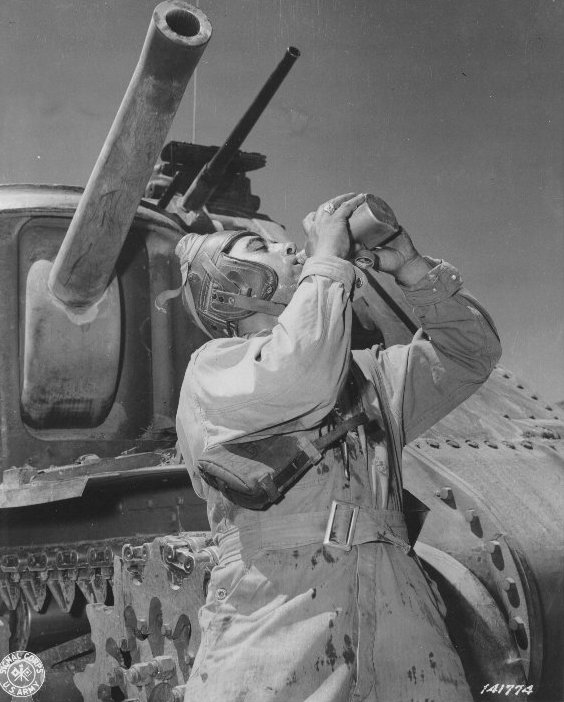
CPL Phillip Margherito of HQ. Co. 752nd Tank Btn., takes a cooling drink from his canteen while training in the United States. June 1942

The 752nd Tank Battalion was an American independent tank battalion that participated in the Mediterranean Theater of Operations with the US Fifth Army in World War II.

The 752nd Tank Battalion officially formed on 1 June 1941.

On 21 March 1943, while in Tunisia, the battalion was inactivated by General Orders Number 31, Fifth Army, and was reconstituted as the 2642nd Armored Replacement Battalion. Their role during this time was to train and prepare replacements for various armored units in North Africa. On 16 September 1943, however, the clerical error was discovered, the general order inactivating the battalion was rescinded, and the 752nd was reactivated as a combat battalion. The unit remained in Tabarka and Bizerte until they shipped to Naples on 12 January 1944 to join the Italian Campaign.

== First Combat - 23 May 1944 ==
The unit was part of the US Fifth Army attached to the 88th Infantry Division when it first engaged the enemy.

== Attachments ==
During its time in the MTO, the 752nd was attached to the following units, either as a whole Battalion or individual companies:

- US II Corps
- US IV Corps
- US 34th Infantry Division
- US 85th Infantry Division
- US 88th Infantry Division
- US 442nd Infantry Regiment
