= 743rd Tank Battalion =

- Active: 1942–45
- Country: United States
- Branch: United States Army
- Type: Tank/armor
- Size: Battalion
- Motto: "We Keep the Faith"
- Equipment: M4 Sherman; M5 Stuart
- Campaign credit: World War II: Normandy with Arrowhead; Northern France; Rhineland; Ardennes-Alsace; Central Europe

Commanders
- Notable commanders: John S. Upham Jr.

Insignia
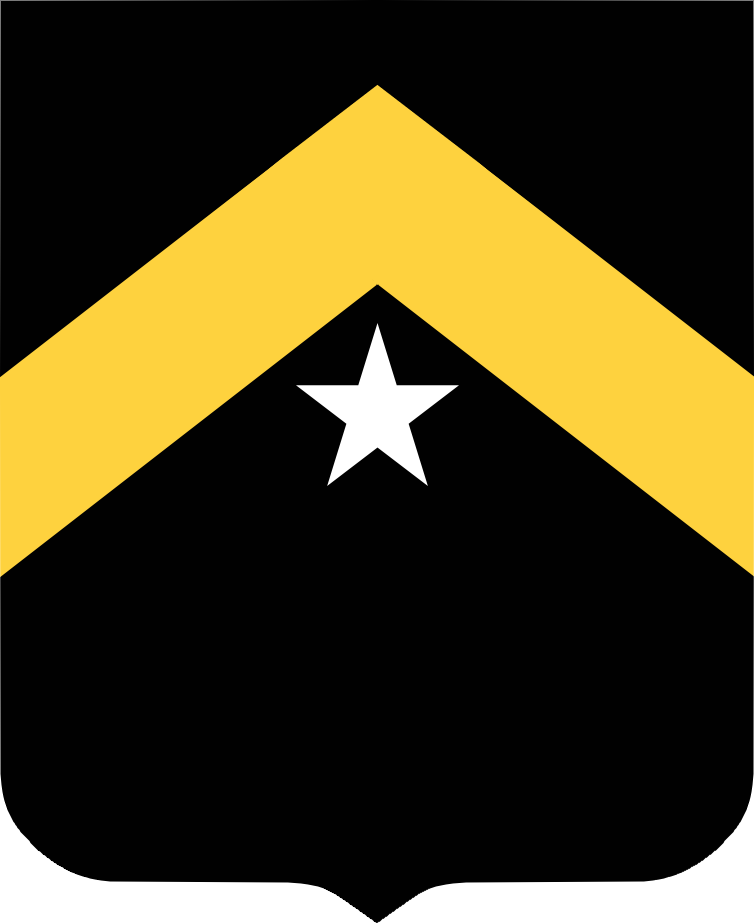
- Distinctive unit insignia

The 743rd Tank Battalion was a US Army independent tank battalion in the European theater during World War II. It was one of five tank battalions (all independent) which took part in the initial landings of the Invasion of Normandy (6 June 1944). The battalion participated in combat operations throughout northern Europe until the end of the war in Europe. It was inactivated on 27 November 1945.

== History ==
=== Activation and deployment ===
The 743rd Tank Battalion was activated at Fort Lewis, Washington on 16 May 1942 as the 743rd Tank Battalion (Light), drawing its initial cadre from personnel transferred from the 757th Tank Battalion. It was redesignated as the 743rd Tank Battalion (Medium) in October 1942. The battalion was equipped with medium tanks and trained the next year at Camp Young, California and Camp Laguna, Arizona.

The 743rd embarked in New York on 17 November 1943 aboard the Aquitania and arrived at Monrock, Scotland on 25 November 1943. Soon after its arrival in Great Britain, it was reorganized in a new table of organization: Companies A, B, and C organized as medium tank companies with the M4 Shermans. Company D was subsequently formed as the light tank company of the unit with a cadre from the medium tank companies and the 10th Tank Company, (Note: The 10th Tank Company was itself formed from Company C of the 70th Tank Battalion in February 1942.) and was redesignated the 743rd Tank Battalion on 2 December 1943.

=== Battle of Normandy ===
The battalion was selected to be one of the three tank assault battalions that would land with the first wave on D-Day. Companies B and C were given amphibious dual drive (DD) variant of the Sherman tank (16 in each) and began their special training in December 1943.

The battalion loaded into their assault craft on 2–3 June 1944 for the invasion landings. In the early hours of 6 June, the three medium tank companies, the headquarters tank section, and the assault gun platoon launched in their LCTs. However, given the rough seas, the battalion commander decided not to launch the DD tanks into the water to "swim" ashore and all were landed on to the shore from the LCTs.

The tanks supported the 116th Infantry Combat Team of the 29th Infantry Division assault of Omaha Beach from Dog Green to Easy Green sectors. The first tanks, from Company C, arrived on the beach at H-6: 4 minutes late, but ahead of the infantry assault forces. Landing opposite the Vierville defences, Company B lost all its officers bar one and half its DD tanks; the other companies landing to the east fared better. Enduring losses from enemy fire, artillery, mines, and even the rough surf, the tanks finally moved off the beach to the vicinity of Vierville-sur-Mer at about 2230. Nine of the battalion's thirteen Distinguished Service Crosses awarded during World War II were awarded for actions on Omaha Beach on 6 June 1944. As an independent unit, the battalion was used to support other formations; by 14 June, some or all of the battalion had been attached to the 29th Infantry Division, 1st Infantry Division, 30th Infantry Division, 3rd Armored Division, and had also provided support to the 5th Ranger Battalion.

On 14 June the 743rd Tank Battalion was attached to the 30th Infantry Division, with whom they would remain for the remainder of the war in Europe, and supported the crossing of the Vire River on 7 July 1944. On 24–25 July, located forward with the assault forces of the 30th Infantry Division near St. Lô, the battalion was among those hit when Allied aircraft dropped their bombs short of the intended targets. Although casualties were light inside their armored vehicles, the accompanying infantry suffered much heavier losses. Having begun the assault that created the breakout from Normandy, the battalion's pace quickened and, on 19–20 August, road marched 123 miles in 18 hours. By 3 September they had reached Belgium, on 12 September had crossed into The Netherlands and within another week were across the German border.

=== Siegfried Line and Battle of the Bulge ===
Taking a brief respite from the dash across France and Belgium to refit and take on fuel, in October 1944 the battalion was again engaged in bitter fighting on the Siegfried Line to the north of Aachen, Germany. Fighting continued until the end of November when offensive operations were halted in preparation for a new assault to cross the Roer River. As the battalion caught its breath and recovered from the fighting, the offensive preparations were halted when the Germans counterattacked in the Ardennes on 16 December 1944.

On 18 December, the 743rd Tank Battalion withdrew into Belgium to the vicinity of Malmedy, where they continued to support the 30th Infantry Division, which had also been reoriented to repel the attack. The battalion was primarily engaged by elements of the elite 1st SS Panzer Division and in a very confused tactical situation fought a series of hotly contested engagements around Malmedy, Stavelot, La Gleize, and Stoumont. Although the situation had stabilized by Christmas, the battalion remained in contact but did not go back on the offensive with the 30th Division until 13 January 1945.

=== Advance into Germany ===
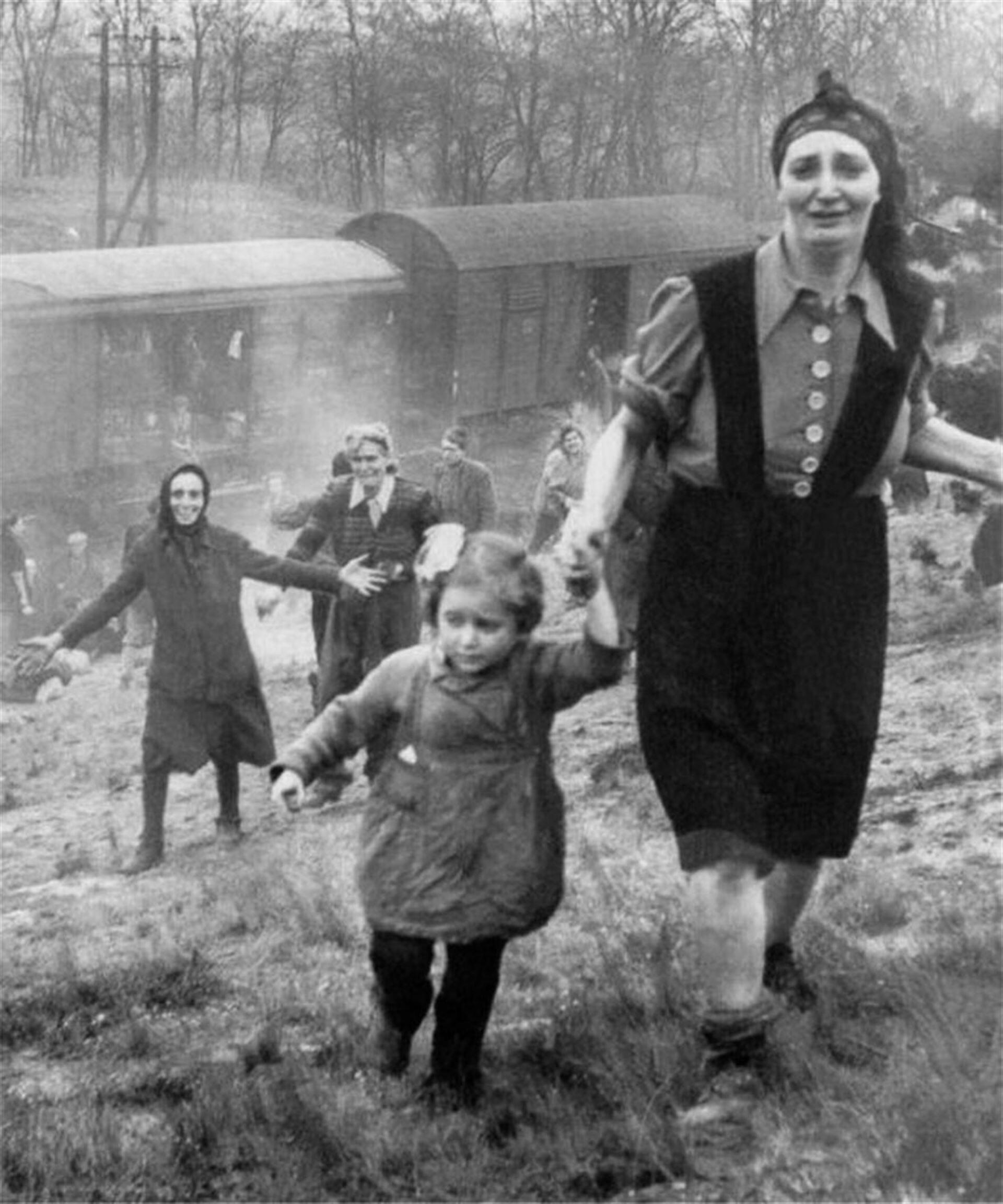
Survivors from Bergen-Belsen concentration camp first experience freedom as their abandoned train is liberated by the 743rd Tank Battalion.

The battalion went into 30th Infantry Division reserve from 28 January to 3 February, at which time they road marched back into Germany, passing through Aachen and bivouacking near Röhe. Waiting for the floodwaters of the Roer River to recede, the battalion assaulted across the river on 23 February.

On 6 March, the battalion was withdrawn from the line in preparation for crossing the lower Rhine River. Company C of the 736th Tank Battalion, equipped with DD tanks, was attached to the 743rd, and led the assault across the Rhine on 24 March, with all 17 DD tanks reaching the east bank of the river. Companies A and C of the 743rd followed on Bailey rafts, with the remainder of the battalion following across a pontoon bridge the next day. The Germans put up a spirited defense near the crossing, but resistance crumbled by 29 March, and the 743rd began the race across Germany, largely following spearhead advances by the 2nd Armored Division.

On 13 April 1945, the battalion liberated 2,141 concentration camp prisoners from a train abandoned outside the small town of Farsleben on the Magdeburg-Wittenberge rail line, about 12 miles (19 km) north of Magdeburg. The train had originated at Bergen-Belsen concentration camp and had been intended to bring the prisoners further into Germany where they could be exterminated before the advancing armies could catch up to them. However, the train was overrun by the 743rd Tank Battalion. One M5 light tank, manned by Sgt. (later Lieut.) George C. Gross, its crew and eight accompanying infantrymen provided security for the train and its liberated prisoners while the unit scrounged up provisions for them. With the assistance of the 823rd Tank Destroyer Battalion and other American units, food and lodging for the refugees were obtained from the surrounding German villages.

=== Post war ===
Also on 13 April, the battalion reached the Elbe River, their "no advance" line. The battalion participated in one last battle as they supported the 30th Infantry Division in assaulting Magdeburg on 17–18 April. In this battle, the battalion suffered its final casualties of the war.

The battalion immediately went into occupation duties, establishing an occupation government over 15 communities to the west of Magdeburg. The battalion was relieved at Magdeburg by British forces on V-E Day, 8 May 1945, and moved to Quedlinburg to take up occupation duties there. Again relieved by the British at the end of May, the battalion again moved south to Mehltheuer and continued its military occupation duties.

The battalion returned to the United States, landing at Boston on 26 November 1945. The 743rd Tank Battalion was inactivated at Camp Myles Standish, Massachusetts, on 27 November 1945.

== Unit awards and decorations ==
- Presidential Unit Citation, 6 June 1944, War Department General Order 85-44.
- French Croix de Guerre: 6 June 1944, Department of the Army General Order 43–50, Attached to 29th Infantry Division.
- French Croix de Guerre: 6 June 1944, Department of the Army General Order 43–50.
- French Croix de Guerre: 15 June 1944, Department of the Army General Order 14–50, attached to 30th Infantry Division.
- Belgian Fourragère: 4–10 September 1944 and 17–25 January 1945, Department of the Army General Order 43–50
- Service Company – Meritorious Unit Commendation: 1 February − 1 April 1944, General Order 100, 30th Infantry Division, 10 May 1945.
- Headquarters and Headquarters Company – Meritorious Unit Commendation: 1 May – 30 June 1944, General Order 129, 30th Infantry Division, 23 May 1945.

== Notes ==
Footnotes

== Bibliography ==
- "1945 Manifest List-Names of those Liberated at Farsleben Germany, April 13th, 1945". Derived from files at Gedenkstätte Bergen-Belsen
- Cole, Hugh M. The Ardennes: Battle of the Bulge. Washington, DC: U.S. Army Center of Military History, 1993.
- via Combined Arms Research Library (CARL) Digital Collection.
  - "Unit Journal 741st Tank Battalion".
  - "S-3 Journal 743rd Tank Battalion June – September 1944".
  - "S-3 Journal 743rd Tank Battalion October – December 1944"
  - "S-3 Journal 743rd Tank Battalion January–May 1945"
- Harrison, Gordon A. Cross Channel Attack. Washington, DC: U.S. Army Center of Military History, 1993.
- Headquarters, Department of the Army. DA Pam 672-1 Unit Citation and Campaign Participation Credit Register. Washington, DC: U.S. Army, July 1961. https://web.archive.org/web/20090811141647/http://www.army.mil/usapa/epubs/pdf/p672_1.pdf
- Jensen, Marvin. Strike Swiftly! The 70th Tank Battalion from North Africa to Normandy to Germany. Novato, CA: Presidio Press, 1997. ISBN 0891416102
- Robinson, Wayne. Move Out Verify: The Combat Story of the 743rd Tank Battalion. Frankfurt (Main), Germany: 1945.
- Sawicki, James A. Tank Battalions of the U.S. Army. Dumfries, VA: Wyvern Press, 1983. ISBN 0960240454
- U.S. Army Center of Military History, "World War II Divisional Combat Chronicles – 4th Infantry Division".
- Williams, Mary H. (ed.). Chronology 1941–1945. Washington, DC: U.S. Army Center of Military History: 1989
- Yeide, Harry. Steel Victory. New York, NY: Ballantine Books, 2003. ISBN 0891417826
- Robinson, Wayne. "Hell Has No Heroes" (Original Title: "Barbara"), Warner Paperback Library, 1972 (first published 1961)
