= 763rd Tank Battalion (United States) =

- Allegiance: United States of America
- Branch: United States Army
- Type: Separate tank battalion
- Engagements: World War II

The 763rd Tank Battalion was a United States Army independent tank battalion created on March 19, 1942 and stationed at Schofield Barracks Hawaii. The Battalion provided island security on the many islands of Hawaii from its inception thru August 1944. The 763rd entered combat Oct 20th,1944 supporting the 96th Infantry Division landing between Tanauan and Dulag in the Philippines (Battle of Leyte). The 763rd continued in action with the 96th thru December 1944.

After 3 months rest and replenishment the 763rd followed the 96th Infantry to Okinawa, landing on April 1, 1945. 3 tanks were lost April 4th in the Assault on Cactus Ridge. Commanding officer Lt Col. Harmon L. Edmonson was lost to Mortar fire on May 10, 1945 and passed to Major Alexander A. Landcaster. By the end the 763rd had lost many of its tanks and was waiting on replacements. The unit was assigned to participate in the invasion of Japan but the war ended before Operation Downfall took place. No longer needed the 763rd was deactivated Dec 2, 1945. In March 1946 President Harry Truman awarded the 96th Division and all units attached to it the Presidential Unit Citation, including the 763rd Tank Battalion.
