= Separate tank battalion =

Military formations used by the US Army during WWII

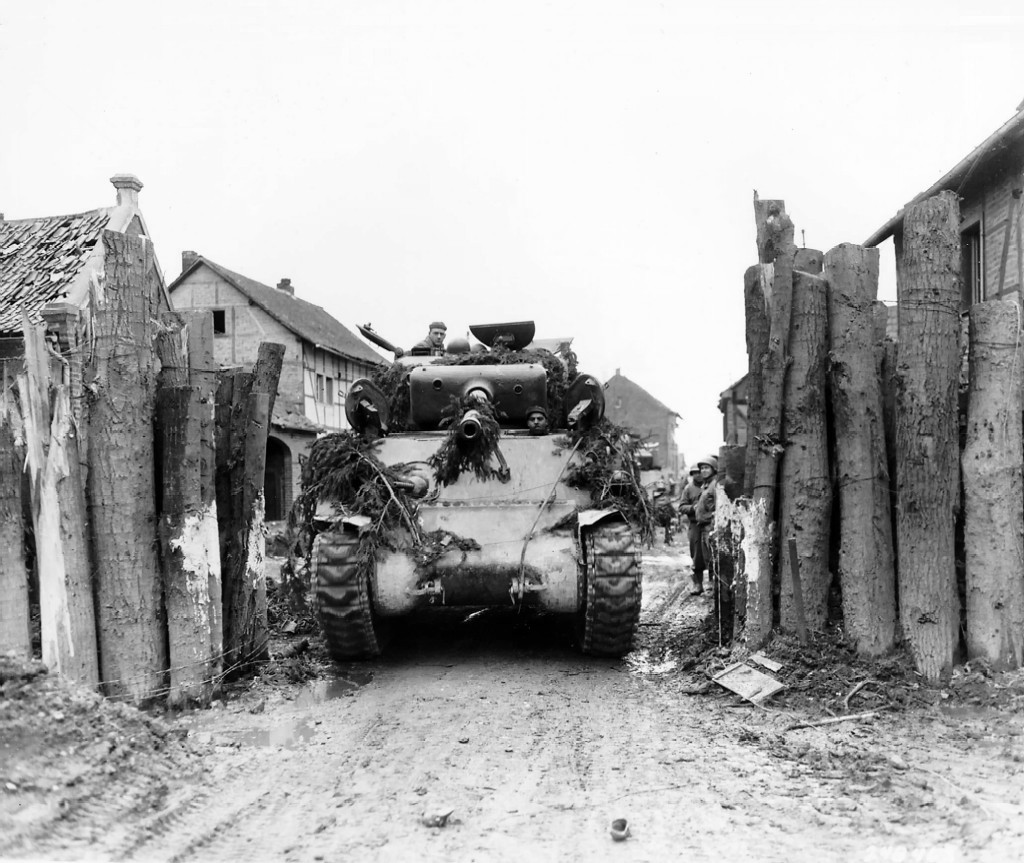
Tank of the 745th Tank Battalion, attached to the 1st Infantry Division, U.S. First Army, rolls through former German block in Gladbach, Germany.

Separate tank battalions were military formations used by the United States Army during World War II, especially in the European Theater of Operations. These battalions were temporarily attached to infantry, armored, or airborne divisions according to need, though at least one battalion (745th Tank Battalion) spent the entire war in Europe attached to one division. They were also known as general headquarters ("GHQ") tank battalions.

== Origin ==
The 70th Tank Battalion was the U.S. Army's first separate tank battalion, activated on 15 June 1940, from Regular Army troops. Four more separate tank battalions (the 191st–194th) were formed soon after from National Guard tank companies from California, Connecticut, Illinois, Kentucky, Massachusetts, New York, Ohio, Virginia, and Wisconsin. More battalions were activated throughout 1942 and 1943.

An important event that helped create many separate tank battalions was an organizational change in armored divisions that occurred in late 1943. Planners decided that the original 1942 armored division model containing six tank battalions was too large. The 1943 model slightly reduced the number of tanks and reorganised from six to three tank battalions. As a result, the U.S. Army fielded two different types of armored division during the war: the "heavy" armored division, based on the 1942 structure (which applied to armored divisions already overseas when the change took place, the 1st, 2nd, and 3rd) and the "light" armored division based on the 1944 structure (which would apply to all newer armored divisions, the 4th–14th, 16th, and 20th). One of the consequences of this change of organization was that the newer armored divisions lost three tank battalions, all of which were either shifted into incomplete armored divisions, turned into separate battalions, or deactivated.

== Experience ==
Battles in the Mediterranean and North African theaters exposed numerous organizational weaknesses in the Army. Perhaps the most significant was the existence of separate, independent GHQ tank battalions. These units, considered inferior in maintenance and training to their counterparts in armored divisions, were usually quickly rotated between different infantry units, not only within a single division but among other divisions as well. At the small-unit level, this made the development of the teamwork and esprit so important to the success of the tank-infantry team almost impossible. Because of their independent existence, GHQ tank battalions lacked proper care and support. Outside of a regular division's personnel and supply channels, GHQ tank battalions suffered from lack of crew replacements, supplies, and spare parts. Unfortunately, GHQ tank battalions were often indifferently commanded, the best armor officers being chosen to command tank battalions within armored divisions. The problem of GHQ tank battalions was a sore one and accompanied the U.S. Army to the French mainland.

— Captain Michael D. Doubler, Busting the Bocage: American Combined Arms Operations in France, 6 June-31 July 1944, November 1988

The separate tank battalions performed well in Europe and Italy, but new equipment was prioritised for the armored divisions. This meant that these battalions were slow to receive upgraded equipment, such as the 76 mm Sherman and the new M24 Chaffee.

One example of this occurred to the 752nd Tank Battalion, serving in Italy. It was February 1945 before the unit was equipped with 76 mm Shermans. In March, however, the battalion was issued 17 new M24 Chaffee light tanks. This proved a boon to operations:

Since the light tankers were now equipped with 75 mm guns, they were moved into the lines for additional fire power, and to relieve some of the medium units which had been in position constantly since the previous October.

But it appears that the new tanks had been issued in error. (Note: A similar situation befell the 751st Tank Battalion in Italy at the same time - M24s that had been issued to them were taken by the 1st Armored Division and the 751st were reissued with M3/M5s that were in very poor condition.) A few weeks later they were taken away and the battalion was re-issued M5s.

The battalion were then issued a "reserve company" of older M4 Shermans to do with as they saw fit:

Seventeen M4 tanks had been received as a reserve pool for the outfit, and each of the medium companies exchanged one platoon of their M4A3s for an equal number of the 75 mm tanks. Plans called for the use of the older tanks to be used in advancing through the mine fields, and the newer jobs to be held as replacements in the event of loss or damage in the advance. Some 50 additional men were also drawn by the Battalion and were assigned to Dog company to be held as reserves. The new men were given a rapid orientation course on the tanks and were tentatively assigned to the reserve vehicles to form an emergency company in the event of its being needed.

The infantry support role was also augmented by the presence of Tank Destroyer battalions, which were originally created to blunt potential armored thrusts by the enemy. But, after the Battle of the Bulge, German armor was rarely used en masse, which allowed them to be used more in support roles.

=== Tactics ===
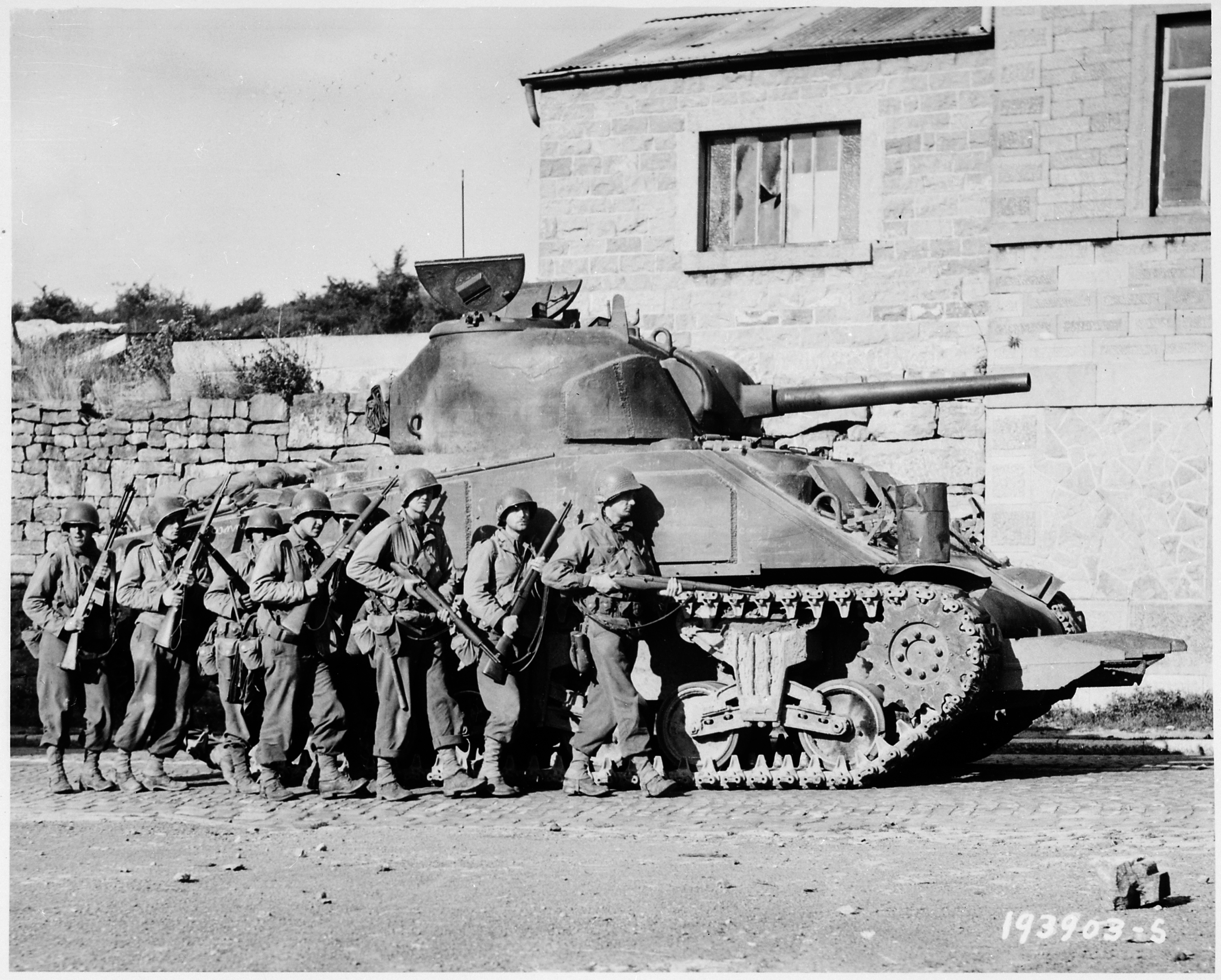
An infantry squad from the 9th Infantry Division works with a single M4 medium tank from the 746th Tank Battalion. The tank / infantry combination became an essential feature of US small unit tactics during the war in Western Europe.

Separate tank battalions were rarely, if ever, used as a single formation in combat, and spent most of their time attached to infantry divisions. The U.S. infantry division of World War II contained three infantry regiments, and each medium tank company was usually assigned to a regiment for close support operations. This could be broken down even further when required, with each of the three tank platoons of a medium tank company being assigned to one of the regiment's three infantry battalions. When breaking out of the Bocage in Normandy, the smallest possible combination—a single tank operating with a nine-man infantry squad—was often used.

The light tank company was seldom used in direct infantry support missions, and usually served in a screening role or to augment the division's cavalry reconnaissance troop in their operations. This was due to the severe limitations of the M5 Stuart light tank, which, by 1944, was under-gunned and too lightly armored to be effective in anything but reconnaissance missions (the 752nd Tank Battalion referred to the 37mm gun as a "peashooter").

The longer a separate tank battalion spent attached to a single division, the smoother the combined operations were, since both infantry and armored units became familiar with each other and with the necessary tactics. Yet, this was not always possible, as the tank battalion would often be moved somewhere else and attached to a different division.

The experience of the 782nd Tank Battalion in late April 1945 was fairly typical once it joined the 97th Infantry Division in Bavaria, with the three medium companies being assigned to the infantry regiments while the light company was assigned to various duties under divisional control:

On the 22nd of April, the Battalion moved from Oberkotzau, Germany to Wunsiedel, Germany. Here the attachment of the line companies to the Regimental Combat Teams of the 97th Division was completed. Company "A" joined the 303rd (Regiment) at Rehau, Germany; Company "B" joined the 386th at Arzburg, Germany; and Company "C" the 387th at Waldsassen, Germany. Sections of the Reconnaissance Platoon were attached to each of the companies to act as liaison between Battalion Headquarters and the Companies. Two platoons of Company "D" remained at Hof to guard the Eastern approaches of the city from an expected counter-attack, while one platoon of Company "D", together with the Assault Gun Platoon, joined the 97th Reconnaissance Troop in the northwestern Sudeten city of Rossbach. The remainder of Headquarters Company and all of Service Company remained under Battalion control, all being part of the Division Reserve. The Division front now extended from Rossbach in the north to Tirschenreuth in the south. The platoon from Company "D" and the Assault Gun Platoon, with the Reconnaissance Troop, on the left flank, the 386th and the 387th Regimental Combat Teams in the center, and the 303rd on the right flank. Service Company had the difficult task of keeping the widely scattered tanks supplied with gas and ammunition, a job excellently performed. Frequently Company "D" provided light tanks to act as armed guards for the thin skinned trucks shuttling to the front.

The 782nd also experienced the mutual relationship with the infantry, where both served to protect the other:

(T)he tanks proved a great asset to the Doughboys as the enemy was strongest in automatic and semi-automatic fire, so dangerous to the Infantry. The Infantry, on the other hand, protected the tanks from the ever-present Panzerfaust and 88 fire, deadly against armor. The tanks also proved valuable in blowing up road blocks and mounting up the Infantry to exploit the rout of the fast-crumbling remnants of the German Army.

== Post-war ==
The success of the separate tank battalions helped to convince planners that infantry divisions should have their own organic armored units rather than have tank units attached to them temporarily. This argument was helped by the "failure" of towed and self-propelled tank destroyer battalions in fulfilling their primary mission—providing quick, massed anti-tank fire against a large German armored thrust. This failure was partly due to the rarity of German armored thrusts throughout the ETO, and partly due to a lack of firepower (at least until the M36 turned up in late 1944). As a result, self-propelled tank destroyer units were often used in the same way as separate tank battalions—providing fire support for infantry actions. Nevertheless, their thinly armored hulls and open turret tops made them more vulnerable to enemy fire.

By the war's end, infantry division commanders "unanimously agreed that they would prefer to have the support of a tank battalion instead of a tank destroyer battalion". The result was a belief that each infantry division should have its own dedicated battalion of three tank companies, with each company serving one of the three Infantry Regiments.

U.S. divisions in the Korean War all had a single tank battalion attached to them. The hilly Korean Peninsula made it difficult for tanks to be used in a breakthrough role, so all of the UN forces were infantry units with various tank battalions attached for infantry support. The Battle of Pusan Perimeter order of battle shows this very clearly.

By the mid 1950s, the US Pentomic Division model had a tank battalion attached as standard. As of 2020, U.S. Marine divisions all have their own organic tank battalions.

== Units ==
List of separate tank battalions
Unit	Theaters of service	Notes
28th Tank Battalion	PTO	Airborne tank battalion later reorganized as a medium tank battalion. Sent to the Philippines in 1945 but saw no combat
44th Tank Battalion	PTO	Detached from the U.S. 12th Armored Division, first tank battalion to enter Manila during the 1945 Battle of Manila, liberated the Santo Tomas Internment Camp.
70th Tank Battalion	ETO, MTO	Formed prior to America's entry into WWII, the 70th was considered an "elite" unit from the outset. The 70th successfully landed its DD Shermans on Utah Beach on D-Day.
191st Tank Battalion	ETO, MTO	
192nd Tank Battalion	PTO	Destroyed in the Philippines in 1942
193rd Tank Battalion	PTO	Sent to the Philippines to reinforce the Philippine-American garrison. Diverted to Hawaii, arriving January 1942 to defend Hawaii against a Japanese landing. Joined 27th infantry Division in the Gilbert Islands After Battle of Makin converted into a medium tank battalion, Rejoined the 27th Infantry Division and trained on tank-infantry cooperation on Espiritu Santo. At Okinawa attached to 27th infantry suffered the greatest single combat loss of tanks in the entire Pacific War.
194th Tank Battalion	PTO	Destroyed in the Philippines in 1942, save Company B
662nd Tank Battalion	ZI	Never left the United States; disbanded
701st Tank Battalion	ETO	
702nd Tank Battalion	ETO	Attached to the 80th Division from August 6th,1944 to May 1945.
706th Tank Battalion	PTO	Guam in July 1944, the Philippines in late November, Ie Shima in mid-April 1945 and Okinawa in late April. The battalion would frequently be in support of 77th Infantry Division.
707th Tank Battalion	ETO	Virtually wiped out during the Battle of Clervaux during the Battle of the Bulge in December 1944.
708th Tank Battalion	PTO	Converted to amphibian tank battalion
709th Tank Battalion	ETO	
710th Tank Battalion	PTO	Angaur, Peleliu, Ngesebus, Leyte 1943-1949
711th Tank Battalion	PTO	Ryukyus Campaign, Okinawa, operated with the 7th Infantry Division
712th Tank Battalion	ETO	
713th Tank Battalion	PTO	Re-equipped as a flamethrower tank battalion before the battle of Okinawa
714th Tank Battalion	ETO	When the 44th Tank Battalion was detached from the U.S. 12th Armored Division and sent to the Pacific, the previously separated 714th Tank Battalion rejoined the 12th AD and fought in the ETO.
715th Tank Battalion	PTO	Converted to amphibian tractor battalion
716th Tank Battalion	PTO	
717th Tank Battalion	ETO	
718th Tank Battalion	PTO	Converted to amphibian tractor battalion
728th Amphibious Tractor Battalion.	PTO	775th Tank Destroyer Battalion Unit History: Established 16 December 1941, at Forrest, Tennessee, as a heavy self-propelled unit. Redesignated Apr. 15, 1944 at Fort Ord, California, as the 728th Amphibious Tractor Battalion. Shipped from Seattle port of embarkation on Aug. 7, 1944 and landed Hawaii on Aug. 14, 1944. Landed Leyte Philippines on Oct. 20, 1944. Landed Okinawa on Apr. 1, 1945.
735th Tank Battalion	ETO	
736th Tank Battalion	ETO	
737th Tank Battalion	ETO	
738th Tank Battalion	ETO	
739th Tank Battalion	ETO	
740th Tank Battalion	ETO	
741st Tank Battalion	ETO	Landed on Omaha Beach on D-Day. 27 of their 32 amphibious Sherman tanks lost before reaching shore, 48 tanks in total lost on 6 June
742nd Tank Battalion	ZI	Converted to amphibian tank battalion; never left the United States
743rd Tank Battalion	ETO	
744th Tank Battalion	ETO	Light Tank Battalion. Landed in Europe 30 June 1944. Initially part of XIX Corps Reserve. Attached to 113th Cavalry Group, 30th and then 75th Infantry Division. Finished war at Olpe.
745th Tank Battalion	ETO	Landed on Omaha Beach on D-Day
746th Tank Battalion	ETO	Landed on Utah Beach on D-Day
747th Tank Battalion	ETO	
748th Tank Battalion	ETO	
749th Tank Battalion	ETO	
750th Tank Battalion	ETO	
751st Tank Battalion	MTO	
752nd Tank Battalion	MTO	
753rd Tank Battalion	ETO, MTO	
754th Tank Battalion	PTO	Light/Medium, First use of M1A1 Flamethrower on M3A1 Stuart tanks the Bougainville "Hornets Nest", Luzon
755th Tank Battalion	MTO	
756th Tank Battalion	ETO, MTO	
757th Tank Battalion	MTO	
758th Tank Battalion	MTO	Colored; light tank battalion
759th Tank Battalion	ETO	Light tank battalion
760th Tank Battalion	MTO	
761st Tank Battalion	ETO	Colored
762nd Tank Battalion	PTO	
763rd Tank Battalion	PTO	
764th Tank Battalion	ZI	Converted to amphibian tractor battalion; never left the United States
766th Tank Battalion	PTO	
767th Tank Battalion	PTO	Light/Medium, M10, supported the US 7th Infantry Division, first to Use M10 in the Pacific Kwajalein Atoll, Leyte invasion landing at Dulag
771st Tank Battalion	ETO	
772nd Tank Battalion	ETO	
773rd Tank Battalion	PTO	Converted to amphibian tractor battalion
774th Tank Battalion	ETO	
775th Tank Battalion	PTO	The Battalion was placed on an alert status, 31 December 1943 North Camp Polk LA., Left San Francisco 28 May 1944 21 day voyage, Landed New Guinea for 18 Day,"Jungle School" and gunnery training, Left on 22 December 1944 to Humbolt Bay near Hollandia Dutch New Guinea, departed 30 December 1944 landed on 11 January 1945 D plus 2 on White Beach #3, Combat operations on Luzon until the end of war. During its time in Luzon it was attached to 6th, 25th, 43rd, 33rd, 32nd, and 37th Infantry Divisions.
776th Tank Battalion	PTO	Converted to amphibian tank battalion
777th Tank Battalion	ETO	
778th Tank Battalion	ETO	
779th Tank Battalion	PTO	Detached from the U.S. 12th Armored Division, sent to the Philippines in 1945 but did not see combat.
780th Tank Battalion	PTO	Converted to amphibian tank battalion
781st Tank Battalion	ETO	
782nd Tank Battalion	ETO	
784th Tank Battalion	ETO	Colored
785th Tank Battalion	PTO	Sent to the Philippines in 1945 but saw no combat
786th Tank Battalion	ETO	
787th Tank Battalion	ETO	
788th Tank Battalion	PTO	Converted to amphibian tractor battalion
812th Tank Battalion	ZI	Never left the United States; disbanded

== See also ==
- Tank Brigade - similar units in British Army during WWII
