= Camp Myles Standish =

U.S. Army camp in Taunton, Massachusetts

- Taunton, Massachusetts
- Troops leaving Camp Myles Standish for the Boston Port of Embarkation

Site information
- Owner: Massachusetts

Location
- Coordinates: 41°56′52.38″N 71°7′56.66″W

Site history
- Built: 1942
- Built by: United States Army
- In use: 1942–1948
- Battles/wars: World War II

Garrison information
- Garrison: Taunton, Massachusetts
- Occupants: U.S. Army

Camp Myles Standish was a U.S. Army camp located in Taunton, Massachusetts, during World War II. It was the main staging area for the Boston Port of Embarkation, with about a million U.S. and Allied soldiers passing through the camp on their way overseas or returning for demobilization after the war. It was also a prisoner-of-war camp. Immediately after the war, it was considered as a candidate site for the United Nations Headquarters.

== History ==
The city of Taunton was notified in June 1942 by the War Department that 1,500 acres (6.1 km^{2}) would be taken for use as a military staging area. The design of the layout for the camp was made by the J.F. Worcester Company. The Matthew Cummings Company of Boston received the contract to construct the buildings. The camp opened on October 8, 1942 and was named in honor of Myles Standish who was the first military commander of the Plymouth Colony region. Camp Myles Standish was the main staging area for the Boston Port of Embarkation where American soldiers as well as soldiers from Canada, Great Britain and Australia processed before moving to the European Theater of World War II, or after returning to the US for demobilization. The camp covered 1,485 acres (601 ha) and could accommodate 1,298 officers and 23,100 enlisted personnel.

As such, a garrison quartermaster was set up so an entire division could be prepared for deployment within a day or arrival. This made train traffic understandably chaotic, with trains regularly coming into town from Providence, Rhode Island, Springfield, Massachusetts and Boston. The yard itself, run by the New Haven Railroad, contained about ten miles of track.

German soldiers who were captured during the war were detained at this camp. Italian soldiers were detained there as well although they were considered 'co-belligerents' because Italy had surrendered by the time the Italian soldiers arrived at Camp Myles Standish.

The camp closed in January 1946 following World War II. The site of Camp Myles Standish was briefly considered as a possible site for the United Nations.

There are several buildings that were once part of Camp Myles Standish that still remain standing as of 2009.

== Redevelopment ==
The Commonwealth of Massachusetts took over the site from the federal government to create the Myles Standish State School for the Mentally Retarded. The patients of the institution were housed in the former hospital area for the former army camp. In 1951, Governor Paul A. Dever was instrumental in providing for over two dozen new brick buildings on the south part of the former army camp site. Following the death of former Governor Paul A. Dever, the Myles Standish State School was dedicated in memory of Paul A. Dever. The City of Taunton acquired over 700 acres (2.8 km^{2}) of the former army camp in 1973 for the purpose of constructing a modern industrial park. The Myles Standish Industrial Park has continued to expand and has become one of the most successful industrial parks in the Commonwealth of Massachusetts.

== Units that passed through Camp Myles Standish ==
- Air Defense
  - 556th Antiaircraft Automatic Weapons Battalion (Mobile)
- Armor
  - 10th Tank Battalion
  - 11th Armored Division
  - 20th Armored Division
  - 34th Tank Battalion
  - 68th Armor Regiment
  - 643rd Tank Destroyer Battalion
  - 712th Tank Battalion
  - 778th Tank Battalion
- Cavalry
  - 30th Cavalry Reconnaissance Troop (Mechanized) of the 30th Infantry Division
- Chemical
  - 93rd Chemical Mortar Battalion
- Engineer
  - 24th Armored Engineer Battalion
  - 167th Engineer Combat Battalion
  - 289th Engineer Combat Battalion
  - 336th Engineer Combat Battalion
  - 348th Engineer Combat Battalion
  - 669 Engineer Topographic Company
  - 1339th Construction Battalion
- Field Artillery
  - 17th Field Artillery Brigade
  - 538th Field Artillery Battalion (Battery A and Battery B)
  - 539th Field Artillery Battalion (Battery A and Battery B)
  - 980th Field Artillery Battalion
- Infantry
  - III Corps
  - 5th Ranger Battalion
  - 17th Airborne Division
  - 26th Infantry Division
  - 70th Infantry Division
  - 76th Infantry Division
  - 95th Infantry Division
  - 99th Infantry Division
  - 106th Infantry Division
  - 172nd Infantry Brigade
  - 218th CIC Detachment (Airborne)
  - 395th Infantry Regiment
  - 501st Infantry Regiment
- Military Police
  - 372nd Military Police Company
  - 524th Military Police Battalion
- Signal
  - 555th Signal Aircraft Warning Battalion
- Air Force
  - 99th Bombardment Wing
  - 452d Bombardment Squadron (Medium)
  - 20th Fighter Group
  - 57th Fighter Group
  - 361st Fighter Squadron
  - 29th Transport Squadron
  - 47th Troop Carrier Squadron
  - 49th Troop Carrier Squadron

== See also ==
- List of military installations in Massachusetts
