= 744th Tank Battalion =

- Active: 21 April 1942 – 2 November 1945
- Country: United States
- Allegiance: Army
- Type: Tank/Armor
- Size: Battalion
- Part of: Independent Unit
- Motto: Vi et armis
- Equipment: M3 Stuart; M5 Stuart; M24 Chaffee
- Engagements: World War II: Normandy; Northern France; Rhineland; Ardennes-Alsace; Central Europe

The 744th Tank Battalion (Light) was a light independent tank battalion that participated in the European Theater of Operations with the United States Army in World War II. The battalion landed on Utah Beach in Normandy on 30 June 1944 and entered combat on 26 July with the 2nd Infantry Division. The battalion participated in combat operations throughout northern Europe until V-E Day, primarily attached to the 113th Cavalry Group and, despite its small size and relatively light firepower, was at various times responsible for tying in the army group boundary, defending army logistical assets, and was attached to or received attachments from British, Belgian, and Dutch military formations. After the war, it was briefly engaged in occupation duties and, upon return to the United States, it was inactivated at Camp Patrick Henry, Virginia on 2 November 1945.

== Organization ==
Light tank battalions were a relative rarity in the United States Army during World War II, due to the light armor and inadequate armament of the M5 Stuart light tank to engage German armor, and the 744th was one of only two light tank battalions remaining in the U.S. Army in Europe by V-E Day in May 1945.

The 744th Tank Battalion (Light) followed the standard organization of a U.S. Army light tank battalion during World War II. It consisted of a Headquarters and Headquarters Company, a Service Company, and three light tank companies (Companies A, B, and C).

- The Headquarters Company included the battalion headquarters staff, both officers and enlisted men; an assault gun platoon, consisting of three M8 HMC variants of the M5 Stuart armed with a short-barreled 75 mm assault gun; a mortar platoon, equipped with three half-track-mounted 81 mm mortars; a reconnaissance platoon with five quarter-ton "peeps" (jeeps); and the headquarters tank section consisting of three tanks.

- The Service Company included a headquarters section; a maintenance platoon; and a battalion supply and transportation platoon, with over fifteen trucks to provide logistics for the battalion.

- Companies A, B, and C – the tank line companies followed a common table of organization. Each company consisted of a headquarters section which, along with a small headquarters staff, included two tanks for the company commander and executive officer; three five-tank platoons; and an organic maintenance section, which included an additional M5 Stuart which effectively operated as a tank recovery vehicle. The companies were equipped with M5 Stuart tanks.

When the 744th transitioned to M24 Chaffee light tank in early 1945, the three M8 HMCs were replaced with three M4 Sherman Assault Guns equipped with a 105 mm howitzer in the turret instead of the usual 75 mm gun. Additionally, the three line companies received one Assault Gun each, reflecting the organization of the medium tank companies rather than the standard light tank company organization.

== World War II ==
=== Activation and deployment ===
The 744th Tank Battalion was activated at Camp Bowie, Texas on 27 April 1942 as the 744th Tank Battalion (Light), drawing its cadre from the 755th Tank Battalion. It departed Camp Bowie on 21 August 1942 for Camp Hood, Texas where it trained against the tank destroyers at the Army's Tank Destroyer School. In July 1943, the battalion departed for Louisiana to participate in the Louisiana Maneuvers with the Third Army. On 21 September 1943, the battalion moved by train to Fort Jackson, South Carolina, where they made final preparations for overseas deployment).

On 20 November 1943, the 744th departed Fort Jackson for Camp Myles Standish, Massachusetts, awaiting transportation to England. On 28 December, the battalion embarked aboard the USAT George S. Simonds, departing the following day. The Simonds arrived in Liverpool on 9 January 1944.

The battalion arrived first at Cwrt-y-Gollen, Wales, which served as its home base, then conducted gunnery training at Castlemartin on the south coast of Pembrokeshire and field exercises with the 82nd Airborne Division at Strawberry Hill near Mansfield, England. The 744th left Cwrt-y-Gollen for good on 1 May 1944, moved to a staging area at Ludlow, where they waterproofed vehicles and equipment, then to a concentration area near Minchinhampton, and on to Weymouth, where they boarded LSTs and LCTs bound for France on 29 June 1944.

=== Combat in France ===
Coming ashore at Utah Beach on 30 June, the 744th Tank Battalion (Light) was under the operational control of the First Army and moved inland from the slowly growing beachhead and reached Cerisy-la-Forêt, where, on 16 July, they were attached to the 2nd Infantry Division. The 2nd Infantry Division further attached the battalion to the 9th Infantry Regiment, where Company A was attached to the 1st Battalion, Company B to the 2nd Battalion, and Company C was held in regimental reserve, while the assault gun and mortar platoons were place in operational control of the regimental artillery.

Operation Cobra began on 25 July and the 744th went into action at 06:00 on the following day, attacking southward from Saint-Germain-d’Elle with the 9th Infantry toward Vidouville, Mouffet, Rouxeville and Saint-Jean-des-Baisants. Over the next three days, the battalion suffered 11 killed, 43 wounded and one missing in combat. (Note: The missing soldier, Staff Sgt. Leroy C. Cloud, was buried in the Normandy American Cemetery at Colleville, France below an “Unknown” headstone. Due to the efforts of the Defense POW/MIA Accounting Agency (DPAA), Staff Sgt. Cloud’s remains were identified and returned to his family for burial in Taylor, Texas on 7 April 2024) On 29 July, the battalion was relieved by Company B, 741st Tank Battalion.

On 30 July, the battalion was relieved from attachment to the 9th Infantry Regiment and the 2nd Infantry Division and attached to XIX Corps. The corps then attached the battalion to the untried 28th Infantry Division and the battalion moved to the division area of operations south of Saint-Lô near Le Mesnil-Herman as the division reserve.

The entire 744th was attached to the 28th's 110th Infantry Regiment, which led the division's attack south of Percy-en-Normandie toward Saint-Sever-Calvados and Champ-du-Boult as they entered the front lines in XIX Corps's sector. As the 28th's front expanded, the 109th Infantry Regiment passed through the 110th and the 744th began support of both regiments. As the 112th Infantry Regiment joined the line, elements of the 744th supported all three regiments as the 28th Infantry Division's axis of attack continued southeast from Champ-du-Boult toward Gathemo and Ger by 14 August. Progress of the 28th Division was initially slow due a combination of its newness to combat, the difficult bocage terrain, and the last gasp of organized resistance by the Wehrmacht. Due to the inexperience of the 28th Division working with tanks and the light tanks’ vulnerability to antitank fire, the tanks were frequently held in reserve, to transport the infantry, or serve as road blocks in the division rear area where the infantry had already bypassed German resistance. As German resistance collapsed over the following week, the battalion broke out into open country and advanced 120 km from Beauchêne on 19 August to La Ferté-Vidame on 21 August. The 744th continued to race across northern France through Cintray and Le Neubourg until it was relieved of attachment to the 28th at Sailly on 27 August and reverted to XIX Corps control, where it became the corps reserve.

The XIX Corps placed the 744th under the operational control of the 7th Armored Group along with the 99th Infantry Battalion. Under the 7th Armored Group, the battalion continued the rapid advance, covering over 125 km through Amblainville and Bray-sur-Somme on 2 September to Guignies, Belgium on 3 September. Once in Guignies, the gathering fuel and supply shortage resulting from the breakout and the lengthening supply chain caught up with the 744th. On 4 September, Company C was attached to the 125th Cavalry Reconnaissance Squadron but, due to fuel and ration shortages at the front, remained in place until it was released from attachment to the 125th on 6 September. It was instead detailed by XIX Corps to move to Valenciennes to guard fuel barges on the Scheldt River. Reflecting the priority placed on fuel supplies, on 8 September, First Army took over direct responsibility for securing the fuel barges, creating Task Force Rau (TF Rau), consisting of Company C and the 99th Infantry Battalion, to guard the fuel supplies and to conduct rearguard security and screen a 30 km line between Cambrai, France and Tournai, Belgium to prevent infiltrating German troops attempting to retire eastward from seizing or destroying the fuel dump. On 13 September, Company C was relieved from TF Rau and returned to the 744th main body, which had meanwhile relocated to St. Truiden, Belgium.

=== Belgium and Holland ===
On 15 September, the 744th received orders to move to a new assembly area northeast of Tongeren, Belgium. At the same time, Company B was attached to the 99th Infantry Battalion, which was itself attached to the 2nd Armored Division to provide division rear area security as the Second Armored Division crossed into German territory and closed on the West Wall near Geilenkirchen. On 18 September, the 99th Infantry was relieved from the 2nd Armored Division and attached directly to the First Army, where it screened the army's left flank and tied in with the right flank of the Second British Army, which was in the final stages of planning Operation Market Garden, between Eysden, Belgium and Maastricht, Holland while guarding the crossings over the Zuid-Willemsvaart canal.

On 19 September 1944, the 744th was attached to the 113th Cavalry Group and moved first to Beek, Holland, then to Sittard, receiving attached companies from the 702nd Tank Destroyer Battalion and the 246th Engineer Battalion in preparation for relieving elements of the 2nd Armored Division between Limbricht, Holland and Tüddern, Germany the following day. The battalion patrolled to the north and elements were engaged in several small-scale skirmishes. On 22 September, the battalion sector was extended westward to the Maas (Meuse) River and reinforced with two platoons of engineers and a platoon of M4 Sherman tanks from the 2nd Armored Division.

Unable to continue offensive operations due to the ongoing shortage of fuel and supplies at the front and the priority of support to Operation Market Garden, the battalion assumed a defensive line oriented north-northeast, from the Maas north of Grevenbicht to the east of Millen (Selfkant), Germany, and remained in these positions until 29 September, exchanging artillery fire with the Germans and conducting only small probes to their front. With First Army finally receiving priority for fuel, and XIX Corps introducing another division, the 7th Armored Division, into the line to the 113th Cavalry Group's left flank to finish clearing the First Army's front west of the Maas, on 29 September, the 744th was task organized into four task forces: TF Davis: Company B, 82nd Engineer Battalion plus 113th Cavalry attachments; TF Anderson: Company C, plus tank destroyer and engineer attachments; TF Roberts: Company G, 66th Armored Regiment, plus engineer attachments; and TF Burnett: Company A, plus tank destroyer and engineer attachments. While the front had been static the previous week, the Germans had taken the opportunity to strengthen the sector and the 113th Cavalry Group encountered unexpectedly heavy resistance. Despite the stiff defense in their zone, the task forces attacked to the northeast taking Papenhoven, Nieuwstadt and Born, Holland, and reached the southern bank of the Vloedgraaf (Anstelerbeek) canal.

On 1 October 1944, a composite force of one platoon from the 747th Tank Battalion and one from Company A relieved Company G, 66th Armored Regiment, which returned to 2nd Armored Division control. Over the next several days, the 744th, with attached engineers and medium tanks and supporting artillery fires, attempted to take Isenbruch, Havert, and Schalbruch to the northeast and east. However, heavy resistance from elements of the 176th Infantry Division, reinforced with artillery, mortar, automatic weapons, and direct-fire self-propelled guns prevented any significant gains. With the tanks too light to breakthrough, the 744th then attempted a dismounted assault, which was similarly thwarted. On 4 October, the battalion was ordered to withdraw from its positions forward of the Vloedgraaf, destroy the bridge over the canal, and establish defensive positions from Millen southeastward to south of Höngen (Selfkant), Germany.

The 744th Tank Battalion occupied and improved these positions for the remainder of October and the first half of November. During this time, the battalion remained very active, improving the tank fighting positions, setting up listening posts, sending out both daylight and nighttime patrols and counter-patrols, and directing interdicting fires on known and suspected German locations, while at the same time encountering harassing fires from both German mortar and artillery fires.

On 6 November, a 140-man company of Dutch volunteer stoottroepen reported to the battalion and were employed around Broeksittard to provide bridge security and patrol the battalion's communications lines. The stoottroepen remained with the 744th while it occupied its defensive positions facing Millen and Höngen.

From 11 to 13 November, the battalion was relieved in place by the British 1st Welsh Guards and 1st Coldstream Guards of the Guards Armoured Division, 21st Army Group. At the same time, the stoottroepen were relieved of attachment and withdrew from the battalion's sector. As the British units relieved the 744th, it was in turn attached to the 5th Guards Armoured Brigade and relieved the 17th Cavalry Reconnaissance Squadron, taking up their old positions from Holtum (Nederland) westward to the Maas, on 15 November. Their new sector was relatively quiet, with mostly light harassing artillery fire and little activity to their front. On 20–21 November, the battalion was relieved in place by the 2nd Irish Guards Armoured Battalion and moved to a new assembly area near Geleen and reverted to control of the newly activated XIII Corps and reattached to the 113th Cavalry Group.

On 28 September, Company B was attached to the 2nd Tank Destroyer Group, which was itself attached to the Independent Belgian Brigade, operating west of the Meuse and north of Maaseik – some 15 km north and on the opposite side of the Maas from the 744th main body. The company participated in the group's successful attack on Wessem on 2 October, then withdrew to an assembly area north of Kessenich. On the following day, the Belgian Brigade was withdrawn from the line and a few days later, on 8 October, the 2nd Tank Destroyer Group was detached from XIX Corps and attached to the Second British Army. Company B remained in its positions outside Kessenich until 3 November, when the 2nd Tank Destroyer Group returned to XIX Corps control and the company joined the rest of the battalion near Sittard.

The 744th spent the next several days resting and refitting and, on 25 November, received orders to move as part of the 113th Cavalry Group to the left flank of the 84th Infantry Division to the northeast of Geilenkirchen, Germany and advance on an axis on the east bank of the Wurm River, curiously oriented northwestward through the rear of the West Wall. However, due to fierce resistance by the German defenders in the vicinity of Leiffarth, the mission was changed to a defensive one oriented on Müllendorf and Wurm with the 744th serving as the Group reserve located at Frelenberg. The battalion remained as Group reserve until 7 December, when they rotated forward with an attached infantry company and relieved the 113th Cavalry Reconnaissance Squadron on the line in the vicinity of Süggerath. This placed the battalion on the left flank of the cavalry group, and therefore of the Army Group, with their leftmost flank unit tied in to the 156th (Scottish Rifles) Brigade. Due to the open terrain on the Wurm plain, the tankers defended their sector primarily dismounted. The tankers and their infantry attachment actively patrolled toward the enemy positions in Müllendorf, Wurm, and Leiffarth and small arms, automatic weapons, and occasional indirect fire were sporadically traded with the Germans.

As the Battle of the Bulge (Ardennes Offensive) unfolded some 50 km to the south beginning on 16 December, XIII Corps became concerned enough about maintaining tight contact with the British right flank that the XIII Corps Chief of Staff personally visited the battalion to ensure liaison with the Scottish Rifles was being carried out, and the battalion was even directed to move a platoon across the Wurm River to the British side to provide direct contact on the ground with the British 52nd Infantry Division.

=== Conversion to the M24 Chaffee Tank ===
The battalion reverted to 113th Cavalry Group reserve on 20 December and alerted for movement, then given first one then another destination several times as it reverted to XIX Corps control in order to turn in their M5 Stuarts and draw new M24 Chaffee light tanks. Finally, on 23 December, the battalion received orders to move and roadmarched to Walheim. Upon arrival, the battalion was informed they would receive their new tanks the following day and would have 25–26 December for crews to familiarize themselves and train on the new tanks. Given the larger operational situation with the German offensive still underway, the 744th remained the only corps reserve and had to be prepared for action in case of a tactical emergency even as they transitioned to the new tanks. The battalion was then briefed on and prepared contingency plans to reinforce each of the three divisions in XIX Corps's sector.

On 24 December, the battalion turned in 12 M5 Stuart tanks, and were issued 18 M24 Chaffee tanks, which were parceled out with six tanks each to Companies A and C, five to Company B, and the remaining tank to the Headquarters Tank Section, thus equipping at least a full platoon in each line company. With the tactical situation still uncertain, training proceeded over the next few days in two-day increments, with classes on maintenance and vehicle storage as well as live direct fire gunnery practice. Battalion officers also received classes on indirect fire laying with the tanks’ heavier 75 mm guns. Crews from the platoons still equipped with the M5A1 Stuarts were rotated onto the new tanks in order to receive familiarization training and live fire practice. Additionally, one or two tanks were dispatched to each of the divisions in the XIX Corps territory to familiarize their personnel with the new tank. By 29 December, the M24s were given indirect fire practice, firing at targets behind the German lines. Throughout this period of re-equipping the battalion, one company was always on alert as a quick reaction force in case the tactical situation required it.

The 744th continued training with the new tanks into the new year and made visits to numerous units throughout the XIX area to familiarize troops with the new light tank, which bore a passing resemblance to the German Mark IV tank. Throughout this period, the battalion leadership continued to develop plans to reinforce the XIX Corps divisions, in order of priority to (1) 78th Infantry Division, (2) 104th Infantry Division, and (3) 8th Infantry Division. Beginning on 1 January 1945, the battalion had Company C, 784th Tank Battalion, equipped with M4 Sherman medium tanks, attached to provide additional firepower to the corps reserve. While the rest of the 784th was engaged in combat in the line, Company C received a large contingent of replacement troops, which were detailed to the company for training with the assistance of the 744th.

On 8 January, the 744th Tank Battalion with its medium tank company attachment was placed under the operational control of the 2nd Tank Destroyer Group. Meanwhile, the companies began platoon-level tactical exercises to develop tactics that exploited the capabilities of the new tanks and continued to conduct indirect fire missions into German-held territory. The battalion received an additional four M24s on 22 January, which were assigned to Company B, and on 25 January, the medium tank company reverted to its parent battalion, the 784th. An additional nine tanks were received on 26 January, and another four on 31 January. Additional M24 tanks trickled in in ones and twos throughout the month of February.

=== The Roer Assault ===
The 744th Tank Battalion's transition to the M24 effectively came to an end on 5 February 1945 when it was relieved of attachment to the 2nd Tank Destroyer Group and once again attached to the 113th Cavalry Group, which was attached to the 29th Infantry Division. The battalion was task organized with other elements of the Cavalry Group and on 5 February roadmarched to its sector on west side of the Roer River as part of the build-up to launch the new American offensive, Operation Grenade, to cross the Roer and advance to the west bank of the Rhine between Düsseldorf and Wesel. The battalion was initially ordered to occupy positions in the vicinity of Kirchberg (Jülich). However, due to thawing conditions and heavy rain, roads were nearly impassible to vehicles and only outposts were set up in Kirchberg, while the main force relocated to positions near Langweiler (Aldenhoven). The battalion was in place to support the assault of the 175th Infantry Regiment across the Roer on 10 February, when the Germans disabled the discharge vales on the Schwammenauel Dam some 30 km upstream the day before. The resulting flooding and swift waters forced the postponement of the assault until the early morning hours of 23 February. The delay created a lull in the fighting, with intermittent automatic weapons, mortar, and indirect fires traded with the Germans on the east bank of the Roer, while the tankers practiced coordinating tactical operations with the infantry of the 29th Division.

The assault kicked off at 03:30 on 23 February. The assault gun and mortar platoons supported the 175th Infantry of the 29th Division in the crossing at Jülich, while the remainder of the battalion was attached to the 119th Infantry Regiment of the 30th Infantry Division on the right (southeast) flank to support their crossing in the vicinity of Schophoven. The infantrymen established a sufficient foothold on the east bank to enable the engineers to build a bridge across the Roer and the 744th's tanks crossed in the early hours of 24 February. The attack continued to the north as the 744th supported first the 119th Infantry, then the 120th, reaching Garzweiler by 27 February, some 20 km from the crossing at Schophoven. The fighting had resulted in the loss of 3 tanks, 13 men killed, and 21 wounded or injured in action. They had destroyed several tanks and antitank guns and assisted the infantry in capturing hundreds of Germans.

As the 30th Division reached their objectives along an east–west line running through Garzweiler, the 2nd Armored Division, followed by the 83rd Infantry Division, passed through their lines to continue the breakout to the Rhine, nearly capturing intact the bridges at Oberkassel and Ürdingen. With the initial assault mission complete, the battalion was detached from the 30th Division and re-attached to the 113th Cavalry Group on 1 March and placed in XIX Corps reserve. While the battalion leadership developed plans with the 113th Cavalry Group for contingency missions to protect the flanks of the spearheading divisions, the companies focused on vehicle and equipment maintenance, integrating and training replacements, and cross training on other weapon systems in the battalion. The battalion also received its six new M4 Assault Gun tanks during this period, representing the only vehicles in the battalion built on the M4 tank chassis.

=== Operation Flashpoint ===
On 8 March 1945, the 744th was alerted for detachment from XIX Corps and attachment to XVI Corps and further attached once again to the 30th Infantry Division. The battalion roadmarched westward nearly back to the Dutch border on 10 March to new assembly areas at Brüxgen and Langbroich. The battalion began training with the veterans of the 120th Infantry Regiment for Operation Flashpoint, the planned assault across the Rhine. For the next ten days, training included driver training, loading onto and unloading from LCM assault craft on the Meuse, live fire gunnery and weapons testing, and practicing laying indirect supporting fires. The battalion departed their assembly areas in Brüxgen and Langbroich late on 20 March and reached their new assembly area in the vicinity of Issum in the early morning of 21 March. The tankers carried out final preparations for the assault and moved forward into assault positions late on 23 March, with Company A attached to support the cross-river assault of the 117th Infantry Regiment in storm boats at Wallach (Rheinberg), while the remainder of the battalion continued its support of the 120th Infantry's assault in the big bend in the Rhine to the northeast of Rheinberg.

Following a very intense artillery barrage which started at 01:00 on 24 March, the infantry assault began an hour later. The first tanks were called forward at 05:45, but congestion at the Traffic Control Point delayed the first tanks reaching the eastern bank of the Rhine until early afternoon. However, the entire battalion had crossed the Rhine and closed on their new positions by 0400 on 25 March. Company A crossed successfully with the 117th Infantry by 1730 on 24 March. Both regiments had pushed east past the Wesel – Dinslaken railway line and, mounting infantry on the 744th's tanks, the 120th Infantry achieved the deepest penetration of any unit in Operation Flashpoint, reaching the east side of Voerde before retiring to positions further west, since supporting artillery could not cover their positions from the west bank of the Rhine. The battalion remarkably suffered no casualties during the first day of the assault.

Seeing the opportunity for a breakthrough, on 25 March, the 30th Infantry Division formed a task force (TF) around the 744th Tank Battalion, augmented by the 1st Battalion, 120th Infantry, two companies from the 823rd Tank Destroyer Battalion, and a platoon of engineers to push eastward to exploit the uncoordinated German defense. Company A was relieved from attachment to the 117th Infantry, and joined “Task Force Hunt” (named after the 744th's battalion commander leading the task force), which moved out at 15:10. TF Hunt soon encountered elements of the 116th Panzer Division, which was still in the process of redeploying into the sector, and firefights broke out every 500 yards or so as they moved east. Although severely depleted by losses on the Western Front ever since the Normandy landings, the 116th Panzer Division was one of the most experienced units in the West and, aided by dense woods and a narrow constricted road network, exacted a toll on TF Hunt. Advancing some 7 km to the east, two tanks and a number of personnel were lost, while the task force destroyed six armored vehicles and several antitank guns and took a “large number” of prisoners.

At 06:30 the next day, TF Hunt continued the attack to the east but met numerous mine obstacles. Three tanks were damaged by mines but the battalion had fitted the underside of many of its M24s with ½-inch boilerplate in a standoff configuration. The boilerplate absorbed most of the damage and the crews suffered only minor injuries. Late in the day, TF Hunt finally broke out of the woods and reached Kirchhellen, covering approximately 8 km during the day. On 27 March, the task force organization had been disbanded but the resistance of the now fully-deployed 116th Panzer Division had stiffened. Company C was selected to support the 2nd Battalion, 120th Infantry's local attack east toward Feldhausen (Bottrop), pushing the front just 5 km during the day.

On 28 March, XVI Corps passed the 8th Armored Division through the 30th Infantry Division to attempt the breakout that the exhausted infantry could not after nearly 100 hours of continuous combat since crossing the Rhine. This left the 30th Infantry Division and the 744th Tank Battalion to follow the 8th Armored Division in zone and mop up bypassed German defenders. Then, as the 30th Infantry Division passed from XVI Corps to XIX Corps, the tank battalion was detached and remained in XVI Corps, passing to the 75th Infantry Division.

=== The Ruhr ===
With the 75th Infantry Division, the mission largely remained one of mopping up and the entire battalion was initially attached to the 291st Infantry Regiment to seize the synthetic rubber plant at Hüls (Marl) on 31 March. The next day, elements of the 2nd and 3rds met near Lippstadt, encircling the German forces in the Ruhr. The 75th Infantry Division, supported by the 744th, continued to push east as far as Brambauer by 4 April.

On 5 April, the 75th Infantry Division received new orders to advance to the south toward Dortmund, executing a 90-degree turn to squeeze the Ruhr Pocket and cut it into smaller redoubts to be reduced piecemeal. German forces inside the pocket defended with discipline and were well-supported by artillery and thus gave ground slowly. The division advanced west of Dortmund and reached the Ruhr just west of Witten on 10 April, seizing two bridges intact. The division cleared the area north of the Ruhr in its sector and was relieved in place by the 79th Infantry Division on 14 April. This was the division's and the 744th's last combat.

=== Occupation Duty and V-E Day ===
The 75th Infantry Division, with the 744th Tank Battalion still attached, retired to assembly areas in the vicinity of Brambauer, then moved south again past the Ruhr River, where they relieved the 5th Infantry Division to begin military occupation duties in the vicinity of Plettenberg on 23 April, with the 744th responsible for occupation duties in Olpe until it was detached from the 75th Infantry Division on 4 June 1945, nearly a month after V-E Day. Occupation duties included manning roadblocks, processing German prisoners, collecting captured ammunition and equipment, and guarding former Russian prisoners of war pending their repatriation. The 744th continued occupation duties until 30 September, then was transported to a cigarette camp in France to prepare for return to the United States.

The battalion returned to the United States at the Hampton Roads Port of Debarkation and was inactivated at Camp Patrick Henry on 3 November 1945.

== Unit awards and decorations ==
- Occupation Duty – Germany: 2 May-30 Sep 1945.

== Notes ==
Citations
