= Villechien =

- Part of Mortain-Bocage
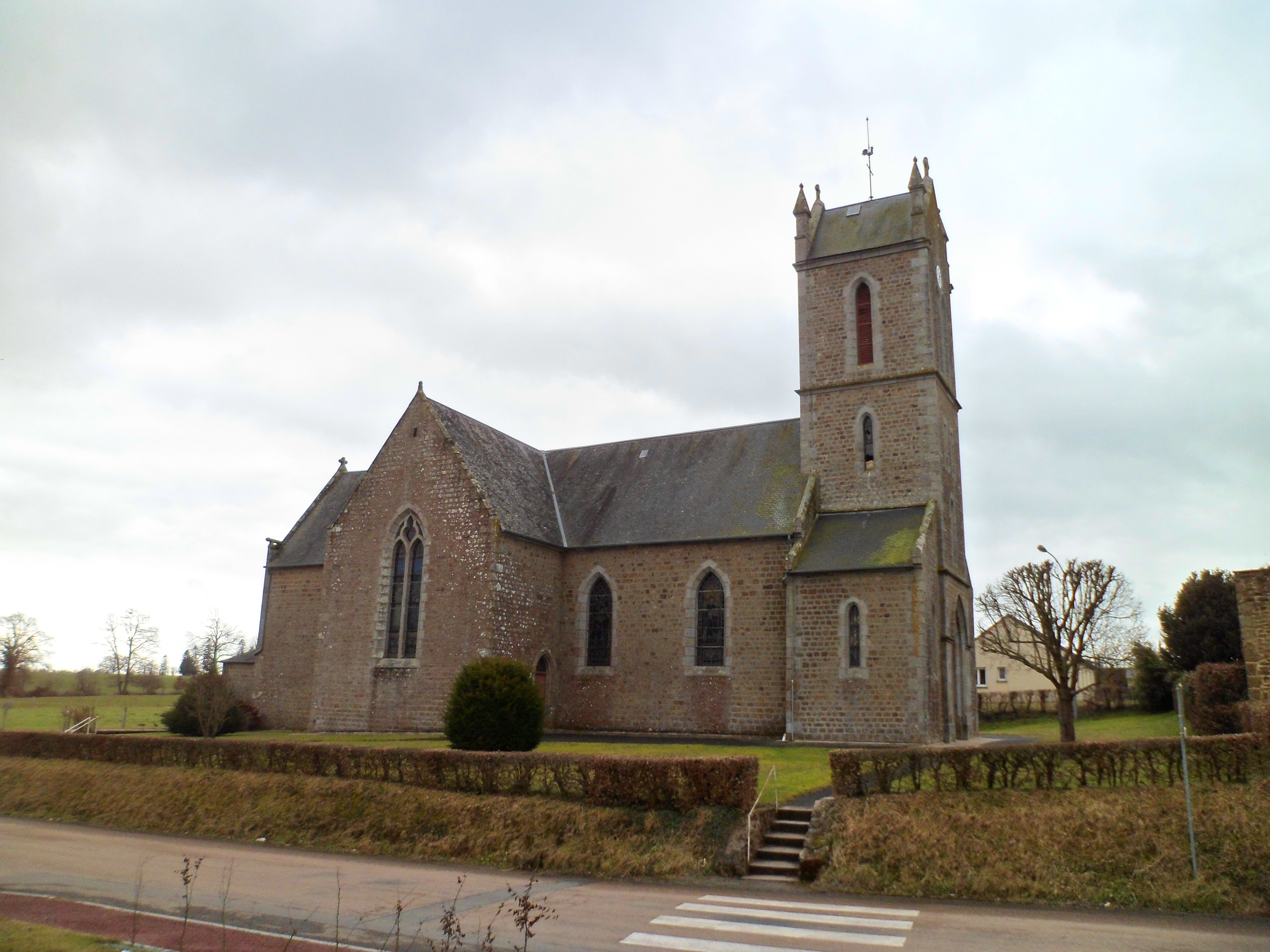
- Saint-Hilaire church
- Location of Villechien
- Location within France Location within Normandy
- Coordinates: 48°34′49″N 0°59′07″W
- Country: France
- Region: Normandy
- Department: Manche
- Arrondissement: Avranches
- Canton: Le Mortainais
- Commune: Mortain-Bocage
- Area^{1}: 10.83 km^{2} (4.18 sq mi)
- Elevation: 125 m (410 ft)
- Highest elevation: 165 m (541 ft)
- Lowest elevation: 70 m (230 ft)
- Population (2022): 164
  - Density: 15.1/km^{2} (39.2/sq mi)
- Time zone: UTC+01:00 (CET)
  - Summer (DST): UTC+02:00 (CEST)
- Postal code: 50140
- ^{1} French Land Register data, which excludes lakes, ponds, glaciers > 1 km^{2} (0.386 sq mi or 247 acres) and river estuaries.

Villechien (French pronunciation: [vilʃjɛ̃]) is a former commune in the Manche department in Normandy in north-western France. On 1 January 2016, it was merged into the new commune of Mortain-Bocage.

== See also ==
- Communes of the Manche department
