= Saint-Jean-du-Corail =

- Part of Mortain-Bocage
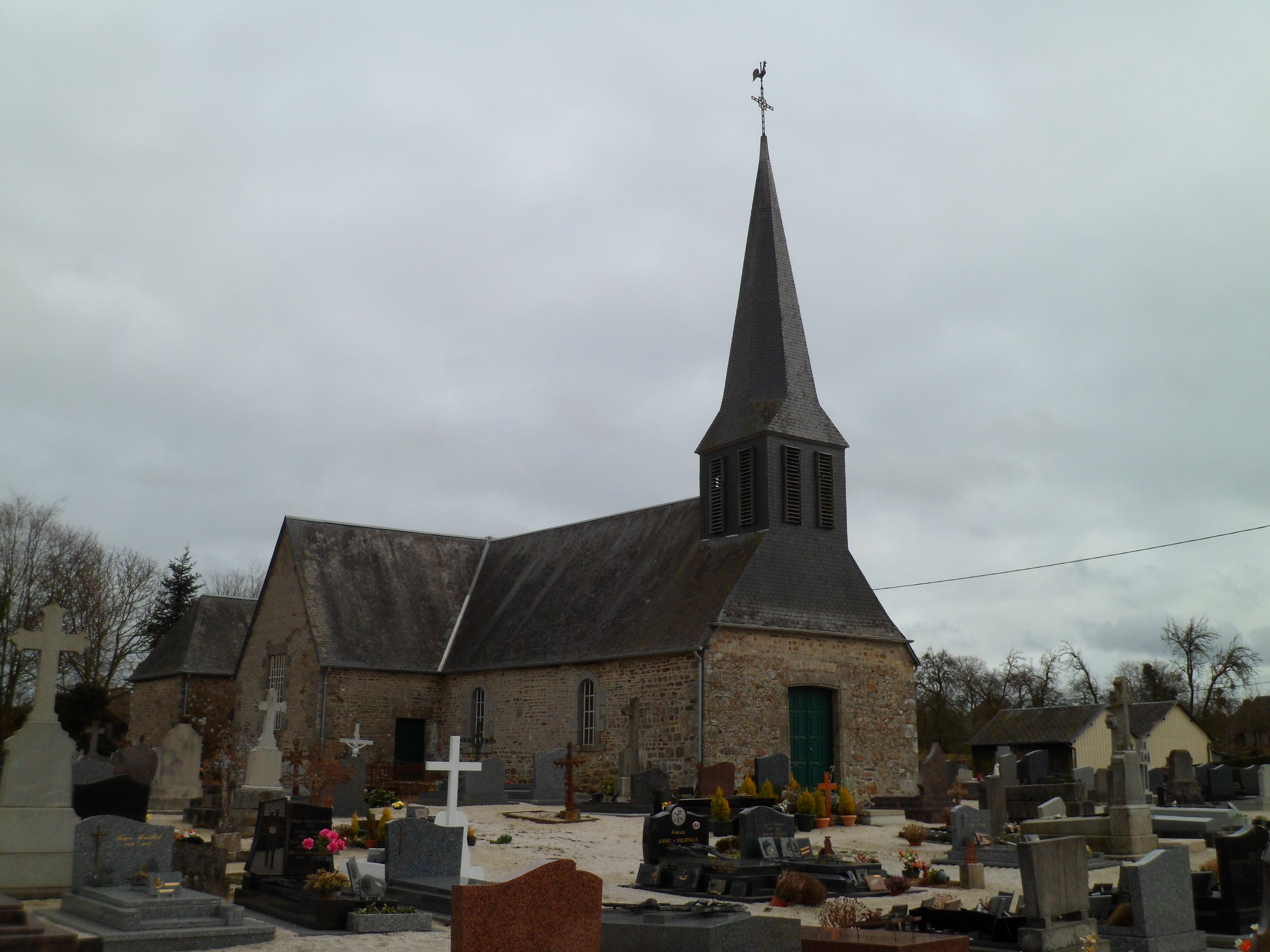
- The church of Saint-Jean-Baptiste
- Location of Saint-Jean-du-Corail
- Location within France Location within Normandy
- Coordinates: 48°36′36″N 0°54′29″W
- Country: France
- Region: Normandy
- Department: Manche
- Arrondissement: Avranches
- Canton: Le Mortainais
- Commune: Mortain-Bocage
- Area^{1}: 14.04 km^{2} (5.42 sq mi)
- Elevation: 127 m (417 ft)
- Highest elevation: 311 m (1,020 ft)
- Lowest elevation: 77 m (253 ft)
- Population (2022): 257
  - Density: 18.3/km^{2} (47.4/sq mi)
- Time zone: UTC+01:00 (CET)
  - Summer (DST): UTC+02:00 (CEST)
- Postal code: 50140
- ^{1} French Land Register data, which excludes lakes, ponds, glaciers > 1 km^{2} (0.386 sq mi or 247 acres) and river estuaries.

Saint-Jean-du-Corail (French pronunciation: [sɛ̃ ʒɑ̃ dy kɔʁaj]) is a former commune in the Manche department in Normandy in north-western France. On 1 January 2016, it was merged into the new commune of Mortain-Bocage. Its population was 257 in 2022.

== See also ==
- Communes of the Manche department
- Parc naturel régional Normandie-Maine
