= Mortain =

Commune in Manche, France

- Part of Mortain-Bocage
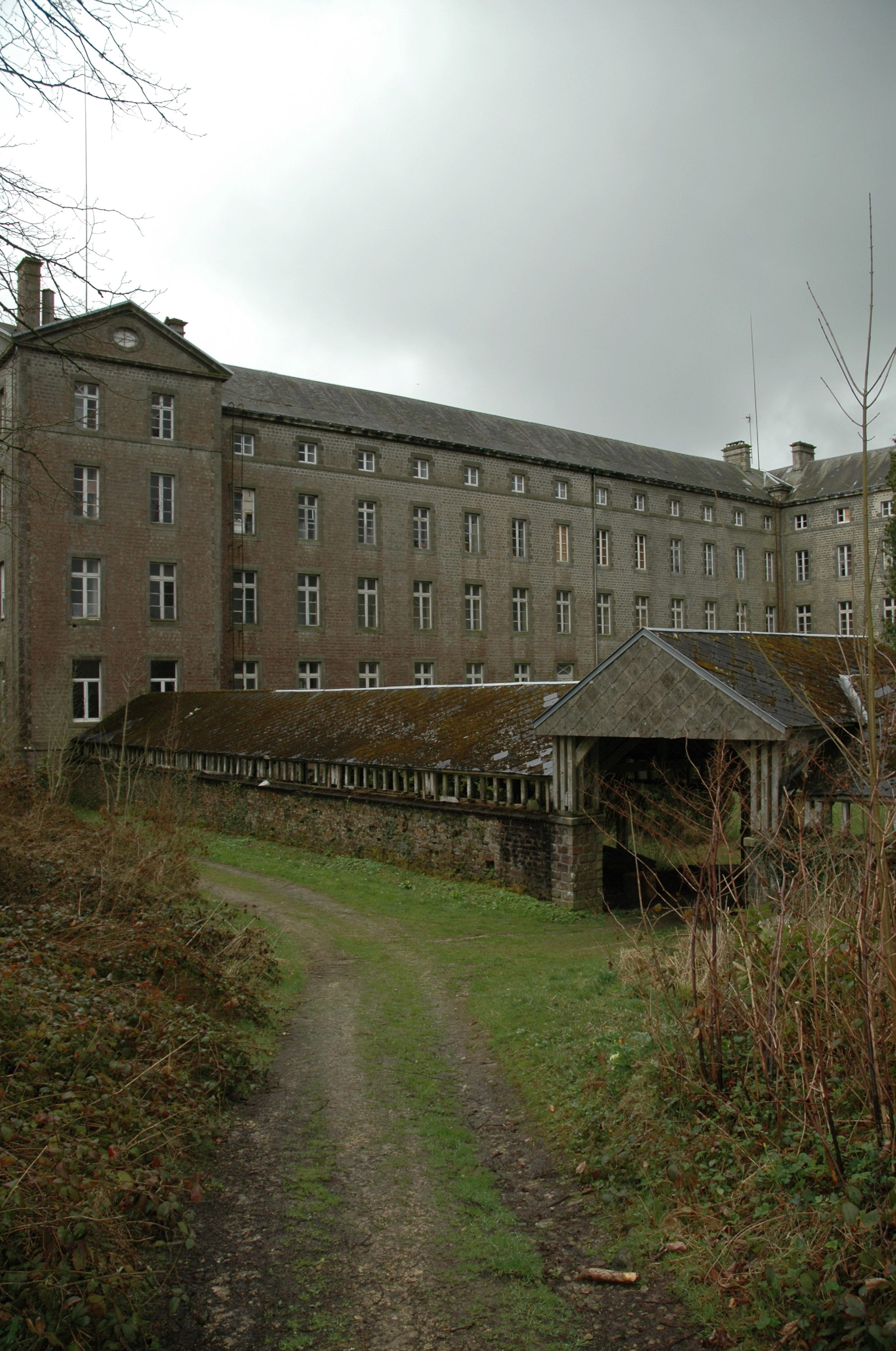
- Abbaye Blanche

- Coat of arms
- Location of Mortain
- Location within France Location within Normandy
- Coordinates: 48°38′55″N 0°56′23″W
- Country: France
- Region: Normandy
- Department: Manche
- Arrondissement: Avranches
- Canton: Le Mortainais
- Commune: Mortain-Bocage
- Area^{1}: 7.44 km^{2} (2.87 sq mi)
- Elevation: 232 m (761 ft)
- Highest elevation: 327 m (1,073 ft)
- Lowest elevation: 102 m (335 ft)
- Population (2022): 1,547
  - Density: 208/km^{2} (539/sq mi)
- Time zone: UTC+01:00 (CET)
  - Summer (DST): UTC+02:00 (CEST)
- Postal code: 50140
- ^{1} French Land Register data, which excludes lakes, ponds, glaciers > 1 km^{2} (0.386 sq mi or 247 acres) and river estuaries.

Mortain (French pronunciation: [mɔʁtɛ̃]) is a former commune in the Manche department in Normandy in north-western France. On 1 January 2016, it was merged into the new commune of Mortain-Bocage.

== Geography ==
Mortain is situated on a rocky hill rising above the gorge of the Cance, a tributary of the Sélune.

== Administration ==
Mortain is the seat of the canton of Le Mortainais. It is a former subprefecture of the Manche department and the seat of the former arrondissement of Mortain, which existed from 1800 to 1926.

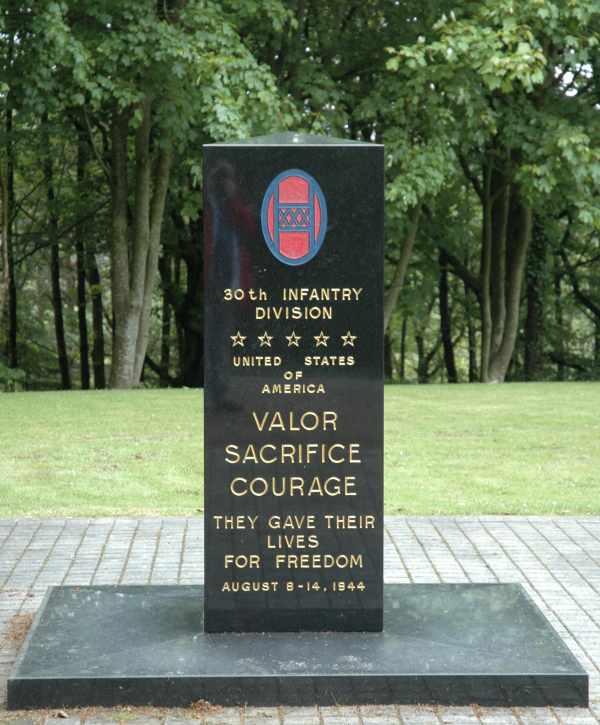
Remembrance memorial - 30th Infantry Division

== History ==
In the Middle Ages Mortain was the head of an important county (comté), reserved for the reigning house of Normandy. Around 1027 it was established for Robert, who was probably an illegitimate son of Richard I of Normandy. He was succeeded by William Warlenc ("the waning") who was probably his son. In or about 1049 Duke William took it from William Warlenc and bestowed it on his half-brother, Robert, thenceforth known as "count of Mortain," whose vast possessions in England after the Conquest (1066) gave name to "the small fees of Mortain," which owed less feudal service than others. Robert was succeeded as count by his son William, Count of Mortain, who rebelled against Henry I, was captured at the battle of Tinchebrai (1106) and forfeited his possessions. Some years later, Henry bestowed the comtéship on his nephew Stephen, who became king in 1135. On Stephen's death (1154) his surviving son William became count of Mortain, but when William died childless in 1159 the title was resumed by Henry II. On the accession of Richard I (1189) he granted it to his brother John, who was thenceforth known as count of Mortain until he ascended the throne (1199). With his loss of Normandy the comté was lost, but after the recapture of the province by the House of Lancaster, Edmund Beaufort, a grandson of John of Gaunt, was created count of Mortain and so styled till 1441, when he was made earl of Dorset.

In August 1944, Mortain was the site of an important battle between the German and American forces. Over a period of six nights the 30th Infantry Division fought (with one radio with dying batteries) against the German Panzer counter-attack of Operation Lüttich, to preserve the breakout established in Operation Cobra. The defence failed and the Germans recaptured the town but could not hold it owing to developments along the front. The famed American author J.D. Salinger, who wrote The Catcher in the Rye, fought alongside the American forces, an experience that his daughter claims led to his post-traumatic syndrome.

=== Heraldry ===
Arms of Mortain	The arms of Mortain are blazoned : Azure, semy de lys Or, a bend compony argent and gules. arms borrowed from Évreux-Navarre family, former counts of Mortain and kings of Navarre.

== Sights ==
The parish church of St Evroult is a magnificent example of the transitional style of the early 13th century. Close to the town is the Abbaye Blanche, founded as a Benedictine convent in 1105 and soon afterwards affiliated to Cîteaux. The church is a perfect example of a Cistercian monastic church of the late 12th century, and portions of the 12th-century cloisters also survive. The ruins of a castle was once the home of the cruel Sir Guillaume de Mortain and the site of the Gap of Goeblin.

== Notable people ==
Mortain was the birthplace of Ferdinand André Fouqué (1828–1904), geologist and petrologist.

Émigrés from Mortain are remembered in the name of the village of Marston Moretaine in England.

== International relations ==
Mortain is twinned with:

- Blandford Forum, United Kingdom
- Thannhausen, Germany

== External sources ==
- World War II Germain Mortaine offensive
