= Operation Cobra order of battle =

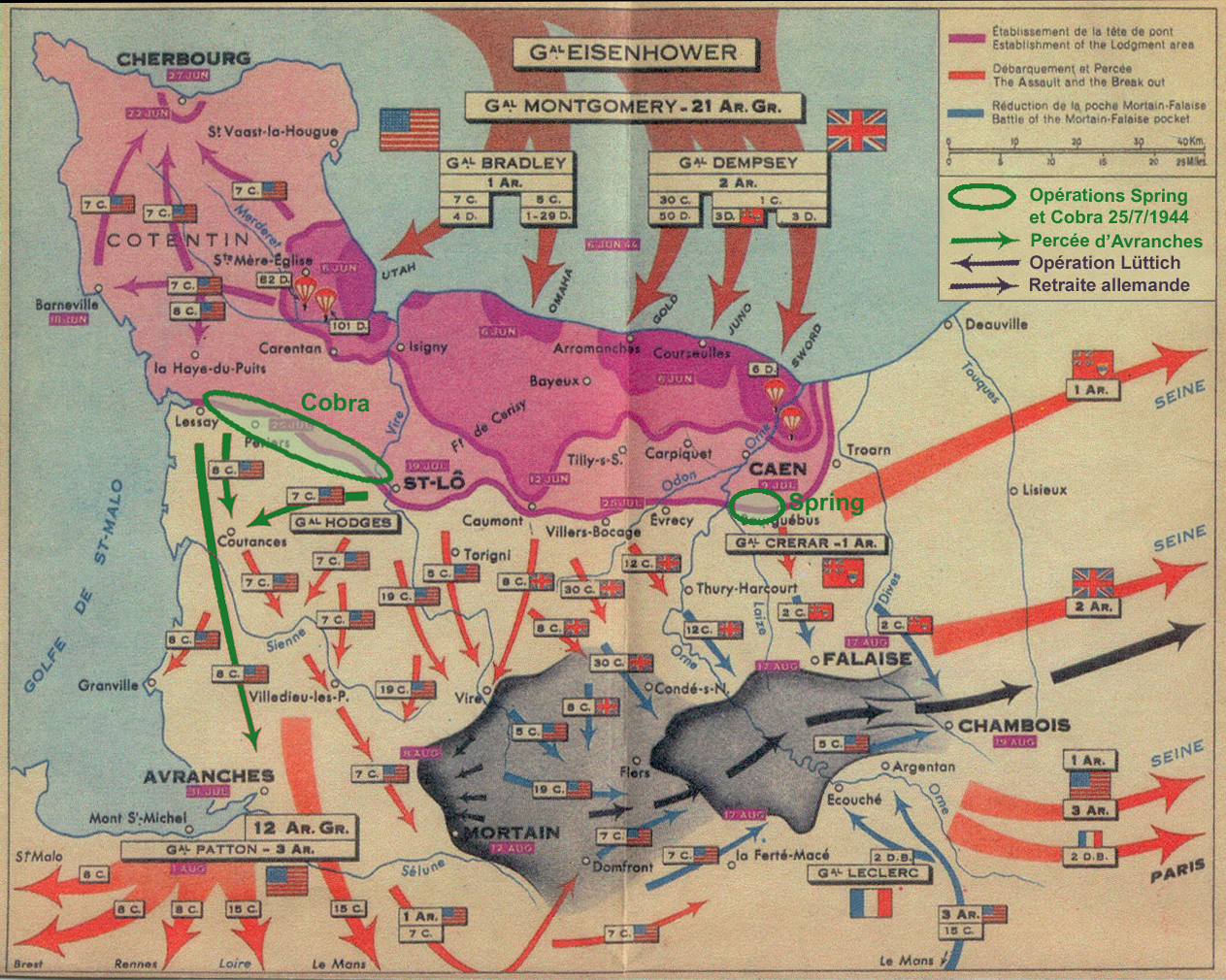
Map of Operations Cobra and Spring

This is the order of battle for Operation Cobra, a World War II American offensive against German forces in Normandy, France that lasted 25-31 July 1944.

== American Order of Battle ==
First Army

Lieutenant General Omar N. Bradley

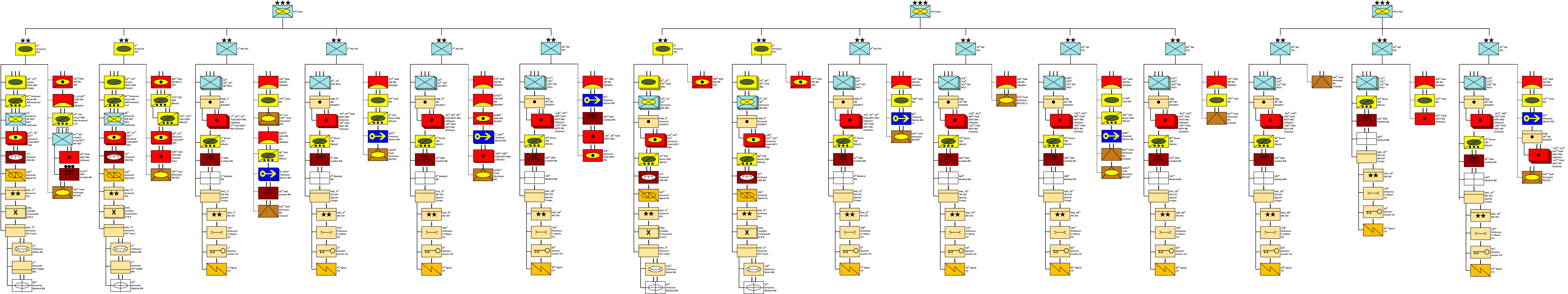
Organization of VII, VIII, and XIX U.S. Army Corps during Operation Cobra 25 July 1944

=== VII Corps ===
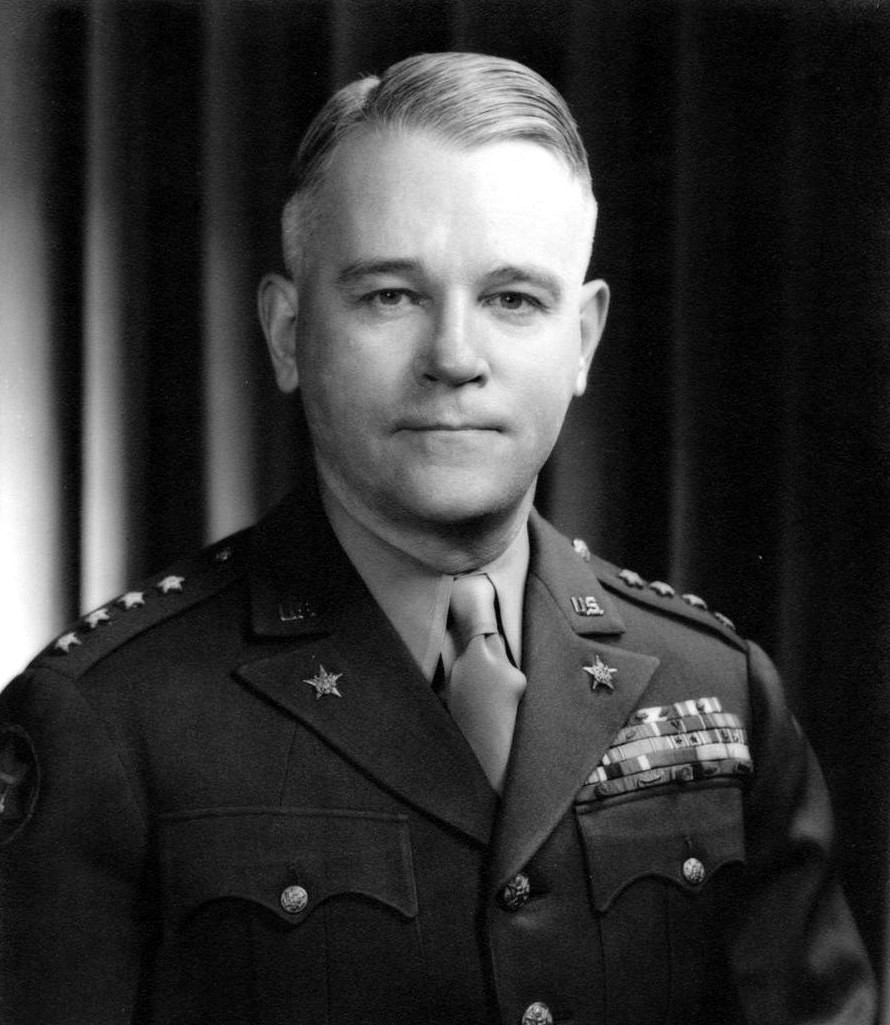
J. Lawton Collins as a full general

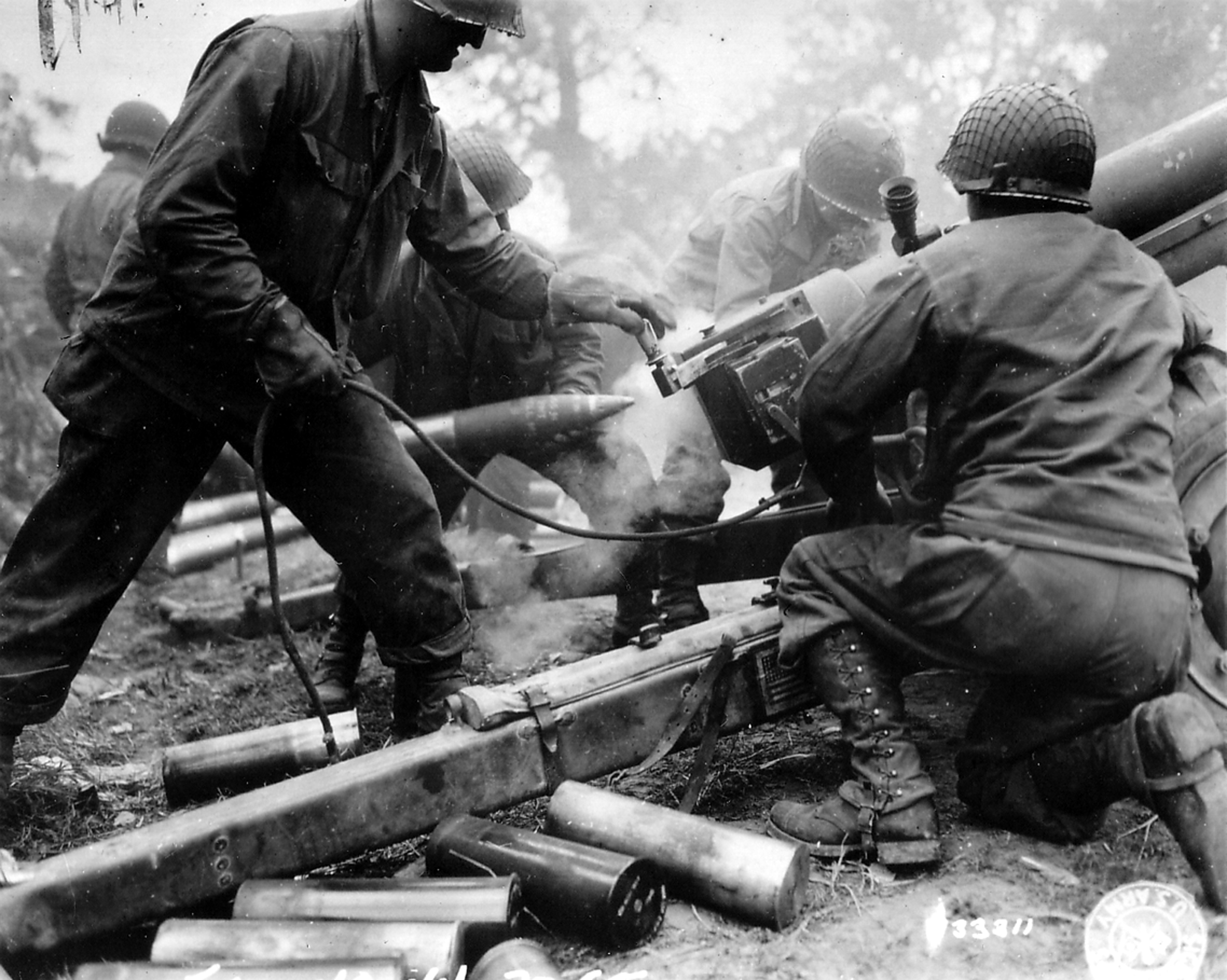
105 mm Howitzer M3

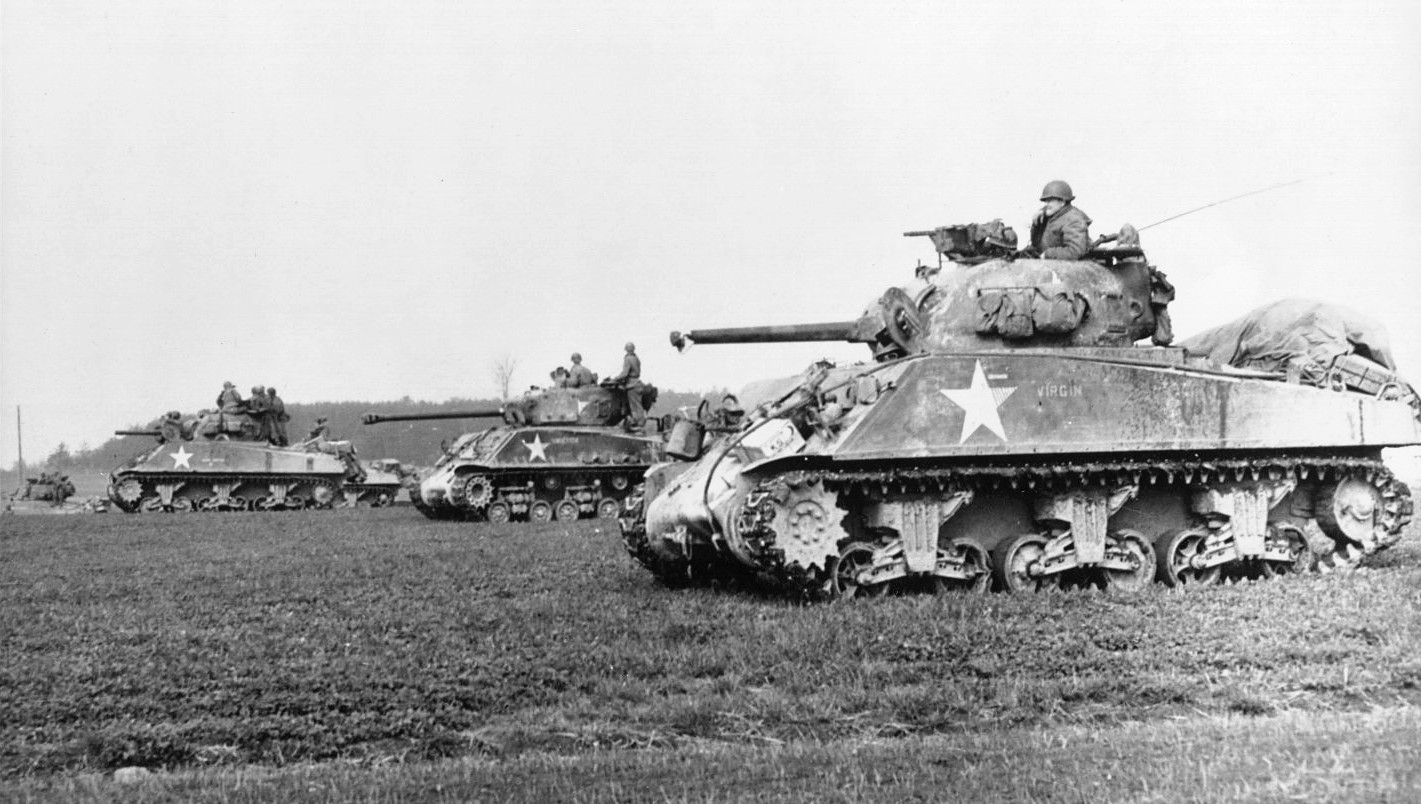
M4 Sherman tanks

Major General J. Lawton Collins

1st Infantry Division
Major General Clarence R. Huebner

Infantry: 16th, 18th, 26th Infantry Regiments
Artillery–105 mm: 7th, 32nd, 33rd Field Artillery Battalions
Artillery–155 mm: 5th Field Artillery Battalion
Armor: 745th Tank Battalion, 635th Tank Destroyer Battalions

4th Infantry Division
Major General Raymond O. Barton

Infantry: 8th, 12th, 22nd Infantry Regiments
Artillery–105 mm: 29th, 42nd, 44th Field Artillery Battalions
Artillery–155 mm: 20th Field Artillery Battalion
Armor: 70th Tank Battalion, 801st Tank Destroyer Battalion

9th Infantry Division
Major General Manton S. Eddy

Infantry: 39th, 47th, 60th Infantry Regiments
Artillery–105 mm: 26th, 60th, 84th Field Artillery Battalions
Artillery–155 mm: 34th Field Artillery Battalion
Armor: 746th Tank Battalion

30th Infantry Division
Major General Leland S. Hobbs

Infantry: 117th, 119th, 120th Infantry Regiments
Artillery–105 mm: 7th, 32nd, 33rd Field Artillery Battalions
Artillery–155 mm: 5th Field Artillery Battalion
Armor: 743rd Tank Battalion, 823rd Tank Destroyer Battalion

2nd Armored Division
Major General Edward H. Brooks

Armor: 66th, 67th Armored Regiments, 82nd Armored Reconnaissance Battalion
Artillery: 14th, 78th, 92nd Armored Field Artillery Battalions
Infantry: 41st Armored Infantry Regiment

3rd Armored Division
Major General Leroy H. Watson

Armor: 32nd, 33rd Armored Regiments, 36th Armored Reconnaissance Battalion
Artillery: 54th, 67th, 391st Armored Field Artillery Battalions

=== VIII Corps ===
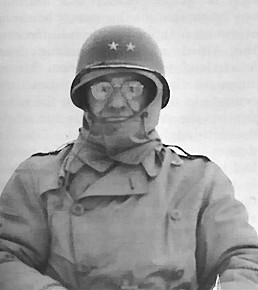
Maj. Gen. Troy H. Middleton during the Ardennes Counteroffensive

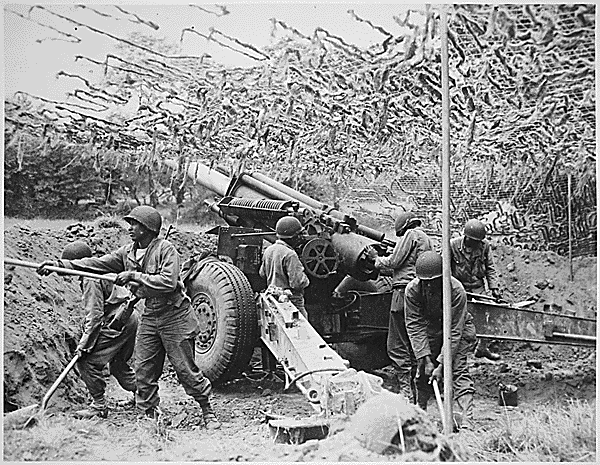
M114 155 mm howitzer

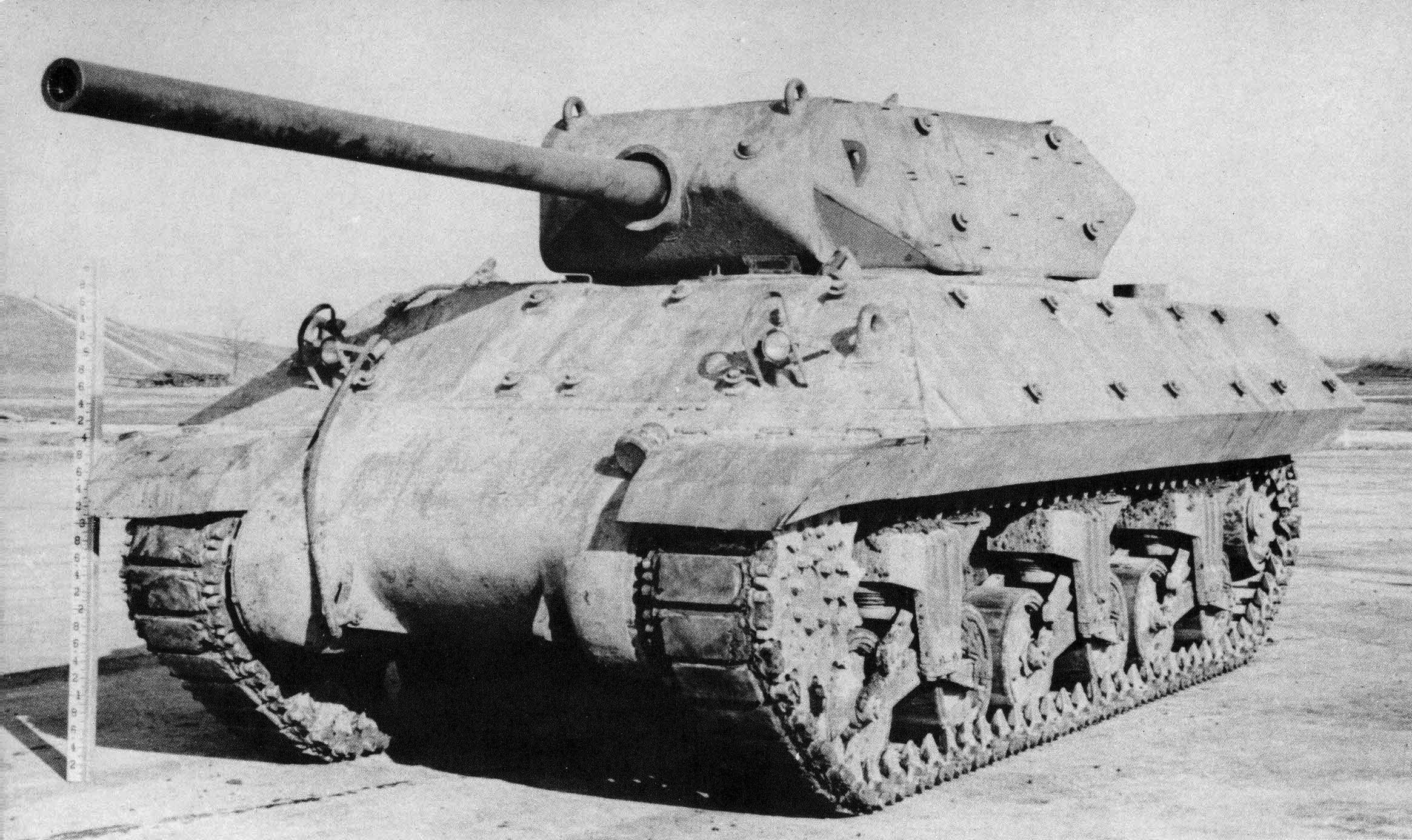
M10 tank destroyer

Major General Troy H. Middleton

8th Infantry Division
Major General Donald A. Stroh

Infantry: 13th, 28th, 121st Infantry Regiments
Artillery–105 mm: 43rd, 45th, 56th Field Artillery Battalions
Artillery–155 mm: 28th Field Artillery Battalion
Armor: 709th Tank Battalion, 644th Tank Destroyer Battalion

79th Infantry Division
Major General Ira T. Wyche

Infantry: 317th, 318th, 319th Infantry Regiments
Artillery–105 mm: 313th, 314th, 905th Field Artillery Battalions
Artillery–155 mm: 315th Field Artillery Battalion
Armor: 749th Tank Battalion, 813th Tank Destroyer Battalion

83rd Infantry Division
Major General Robert C. Macon

Infantry: 329th, 330th, 331st Infantry Regiments
Artillery–105 mm: 322nd, 323rd, 908th Field Artillery Battalions
Artillery–155 mm: 324th Field Artillery Battalion
Armor: 802nd Tank Destroyer Battalion

90th Infantry Division
Major General Eugene M. Landrum

Infantry: 357th, 358th, 359th Infantry Regiments
Artillery–105 mm: 343rd, 344th, 915th Field Artillery Battalions
Artillery–155 mm: 345th Field Artillery Battalion
Armor: 712th Tank Battalion, 607th Tank Destroyer Battalion

4th Armored Division
Major General John S. Wood

Armor: 8th, 35th, 37th Tank Battalions
Artillery: 22nd, 66th, 94th Armored Field Artillery Battalions
Infantry: 10th, 51st, 53rd Armored Infantry Battalions

6th Armored Division
Major General Robert W. Grow

Armor: 15th, 68th, 69th Tank Battalions
Artillery: 128th, 212th, 231st Armored Field Artillery Battalions
Infantry: 9th, 44th, 50th Armored Infantry Battalions

=== XIX Corps ===
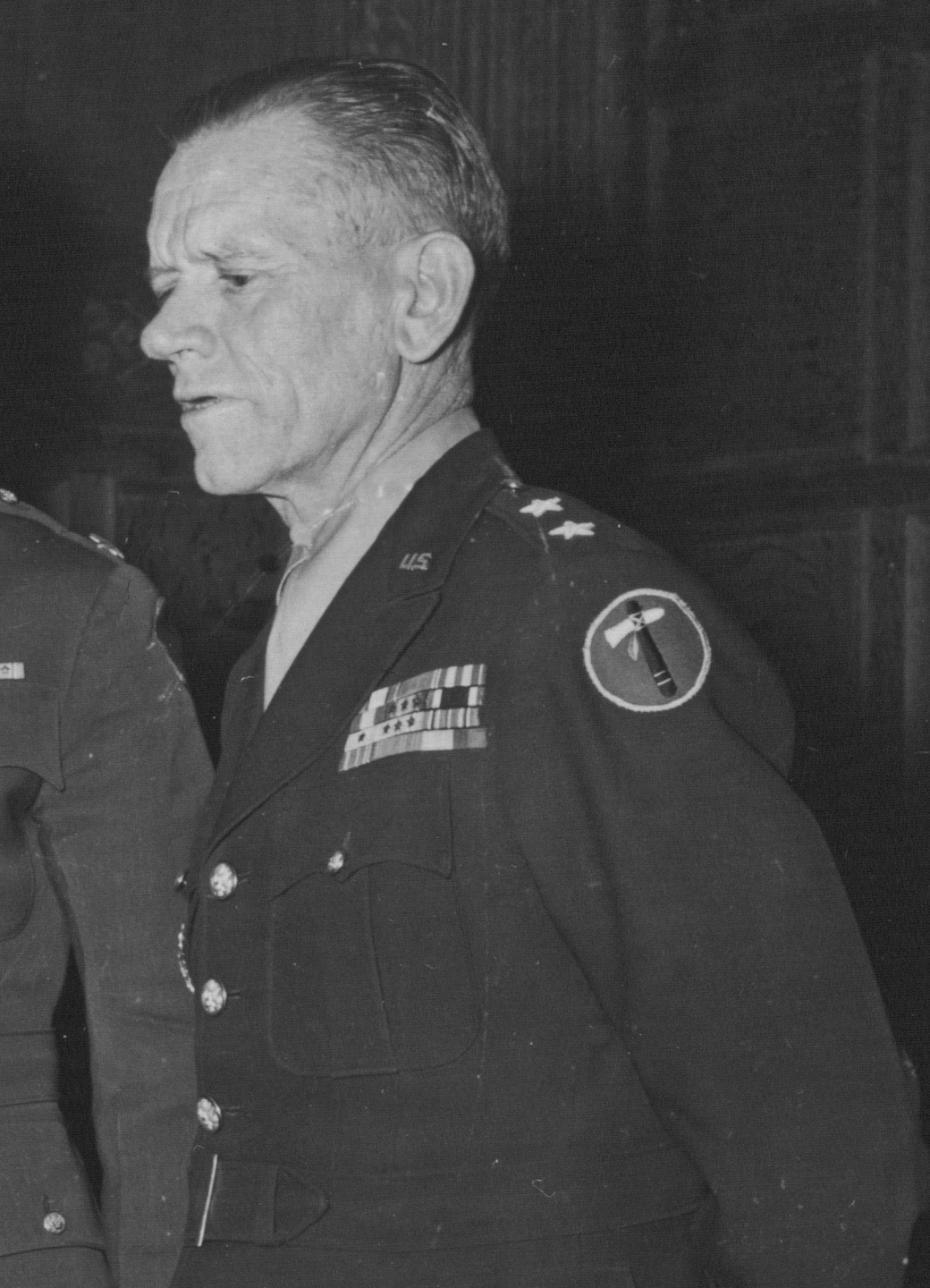
Maj. Gen. Charles H. Corlett

Major General Charles H. Corlett

28th Infantry Division
Major General Lloyd D. Brown

Infantry: 109th, 110th, 112th Infantry Regiments
Artillery–105 mm: 322nd, 323rd, 908th Field Artillery Battalions
Artillery–155 mm: 324th Field Artillery Battalion
Armor: 744th Tank Battalion (light), 630th Tank Destroyer Battalion

29th Infantry Division
Major General Charles H. Gerhardt

Infantry: 115th, 116th, 175th Infantry Regiments
Artillery–105 mm: 110th, 111th, 224th Field Artillery Battalions
Artillery–155 mm: 227th Field Artillery Battalion
Armor: 747th Tank Battalion, 803rd Tank Destroyer Battalion

35th Infantry Division
Major General Paul W. Baade

Infantry: 134th, 137th, 320th Infantry Regiments
Artillery–105 mm: 161st, 216th, 219th Field Artillery Battalions
Artillery–155 mm: 127th Field Artillery Battalion
Armor: 737th Tank Battalion, 654th Tank Destroyer Battalion

== German Order of Battle ==
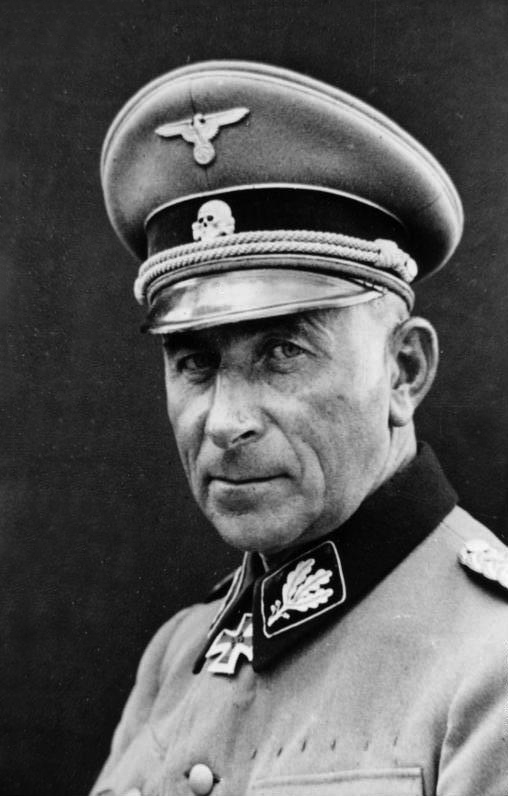
SS-Obgfr Paul Hausser

Seventh Army
SS-Obergruppenführer Paul Hausser

=== II Parachute Corps ===
Generalleutnant Eugen Meindl

5th Fallschirmjäger Division
Generalleutnant Gustav Wilke

13th, 14th, and 15th Parachute Infantry Regiments
5th Artillery Regiment

2nd Panzer Division (Note: Transferred to the Orne Valley area on the evening of July 24th.)
Generalleutnant Heinrich Freiherr von Lüttwitz

3rd Panzer Regiment
2nd and 304th Panzergrenadier Regiments
74th Artillery Regiment

Panzer Lehr Division
Generalmajor Fritz Bayerlein

130th Panzer Regiment
901st and 902nd Panzergrenadier Regiments
130th Artillery Regiment

=== LXXXIV Corps ===
Generalleutnant Dietrich von Choltitz

2nd SS Panzer Division
Sturmbannführer Christian Tychsen
17th SS Panzergrenadier Division
Brigadeführer Otto Baum
116th Panzer Division
General der Panzertruppen Gerhard von Schwerin

16th Panzer Regiment
60th and 156th Panzergrenadier Regiments
146th Artillery Regiment

352nd Infantry Division
Generalleutnant Dietrich Kraiss (Note: Motally wounded near Saint-Lô, 2 Aug 1944)

914th, 915th, and 916th Volksgrenadier Regiments
352nd Artillery Regiment

353rd Infantry Division
