= Notre-Dame-du-Touchet =

- Part of Mortain-Bocage
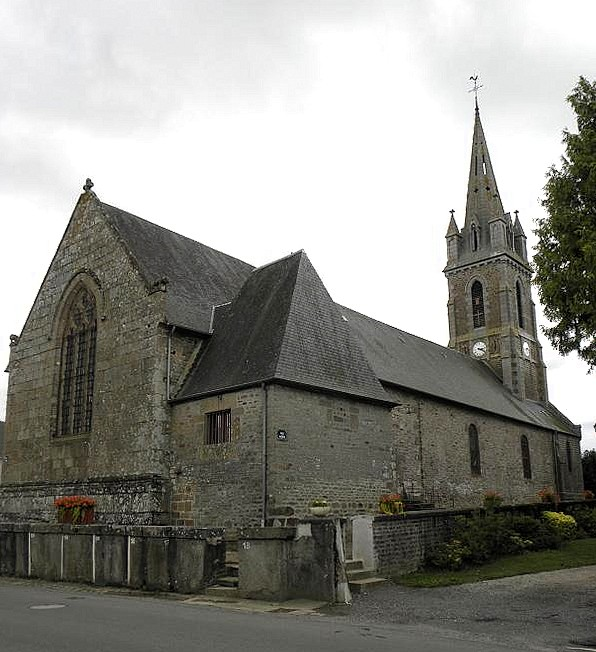
- The parish church of Notre-Dame
- Location of Notre-Dame-du-Touchet
- Location within France Location within Normandy
- Coordinates: 48°34′59″N 0°57′19″W
- Country: France
- Region: Normandy
- Department: Manche
- Arrondissement: Avranches
- Canton: Le Mortainais
- Commune: Mortain-Bocage
- Area^{1}: 17.65 km^{2} (6.81 sq mi)
- Elevation: 149 m (489 ft)
- Highest elevation: 152 m (499 ft)
- Lowest elevation: 71 m (233 ft)
- Population (2022): 611
  - Density: 34.6/km^{2} (89.7/sq mi)
- Time zone: UTC+01:00 (CET)
  - Summer (DST): UTC+02:00 (CEST)
- Postal code: 50140
- ^{1} French Land Register data, which excludes lakes, ponds, glaciers > 1 km^{2} (0.386 sq mi or 247 acres) and river estuaries.

Notre-Dame-du-Touchet (French pronunciation: [nɔtʁə dam dy tuʃɛ]) is a former commune in the Manche department in Normandy in north-western France. On 1 January 2016, it was merged into the new commune of Mortain-Bocage.

== See also ==
- Communes of the Manche department
