= Bion, Manche =

Bion
- Part of Mortain-Bocage
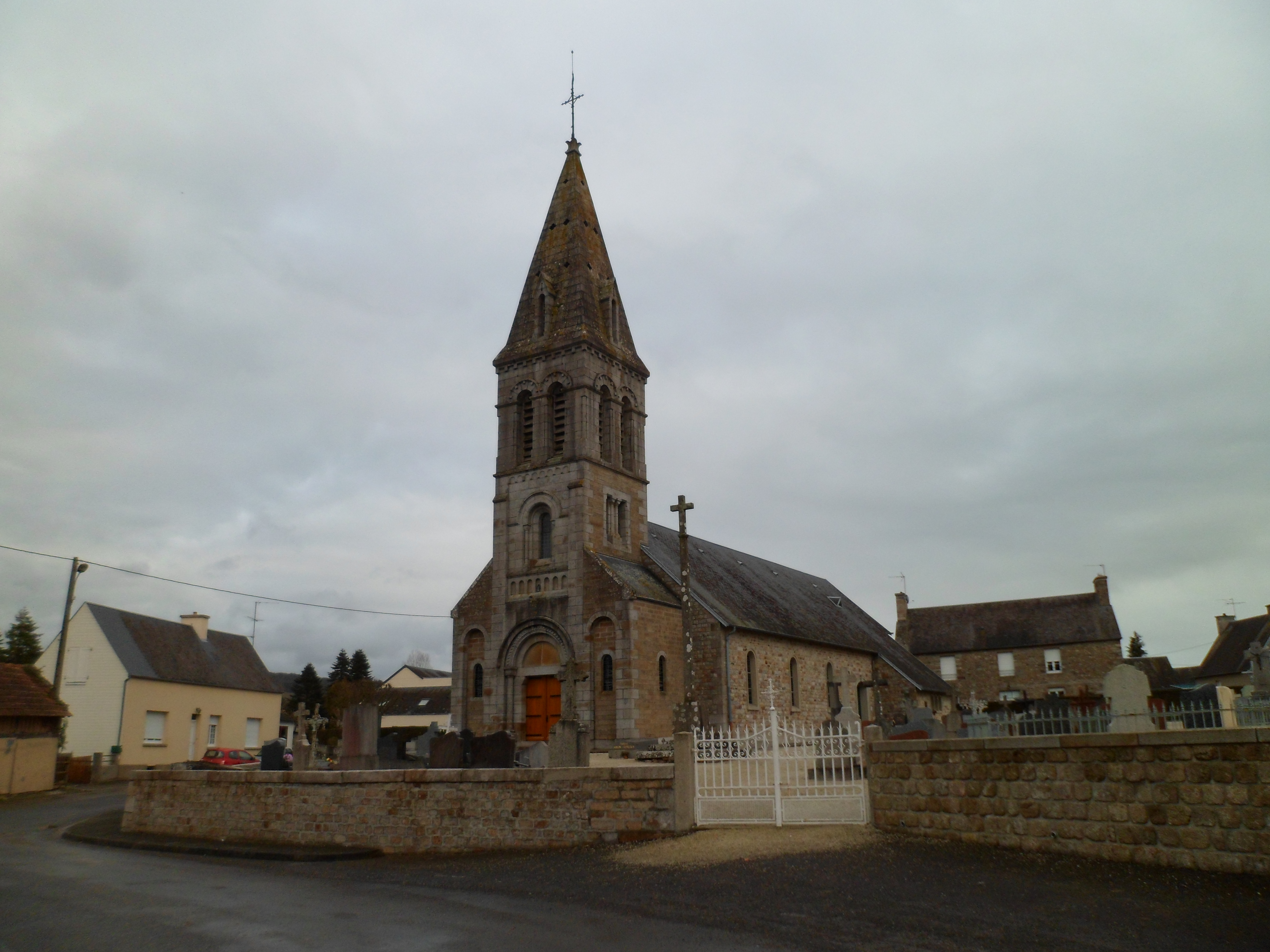
- The church of Saint-Pierre de Bion
- Location of Bion
- Location within France Location within Normandy
- Coordinates: 48°37′14″N 0°55′05″W
- Country: France
- Region: Normandy
- Department: Manche
- Arrondissement: Avranches
- Canton: Le Mortainais
- Commune: Mortain-Bocage
- Area^{1}: 12.67 km^{2} (4.89 sq mi)
- Elevation: 133 m (436 ft)
- Highest elevation: 305 m (1,001 ft)
- Lowest elevation: 76 m (249 ft)
- Population (2023): 376
  - Density: 29.7/km^{2} (76.9/sq mi)
- Time zone: UTC+01:00 (CET)
  - Summer (DST): UTC+02:00 (CEST)
- Postal code: 50140
- ^{1} French Land Register data, which excludes lakes, ponds, glaciers > 1 km^{2} (0.386 sq mi or 247 acres) and river estuaries.

Bion (French pronunciation: [bjɔ̃]) is a former commune in the Manche department in the Normandy region in northwestern France. On 1 January 2016, it was merged into the new commune of Mortain-Bocage.

== See also ==
- Communes of the Manche department
- Parc naturel régional Normandie-Maine
