= Perriers-en-Beauficel =

- Commune
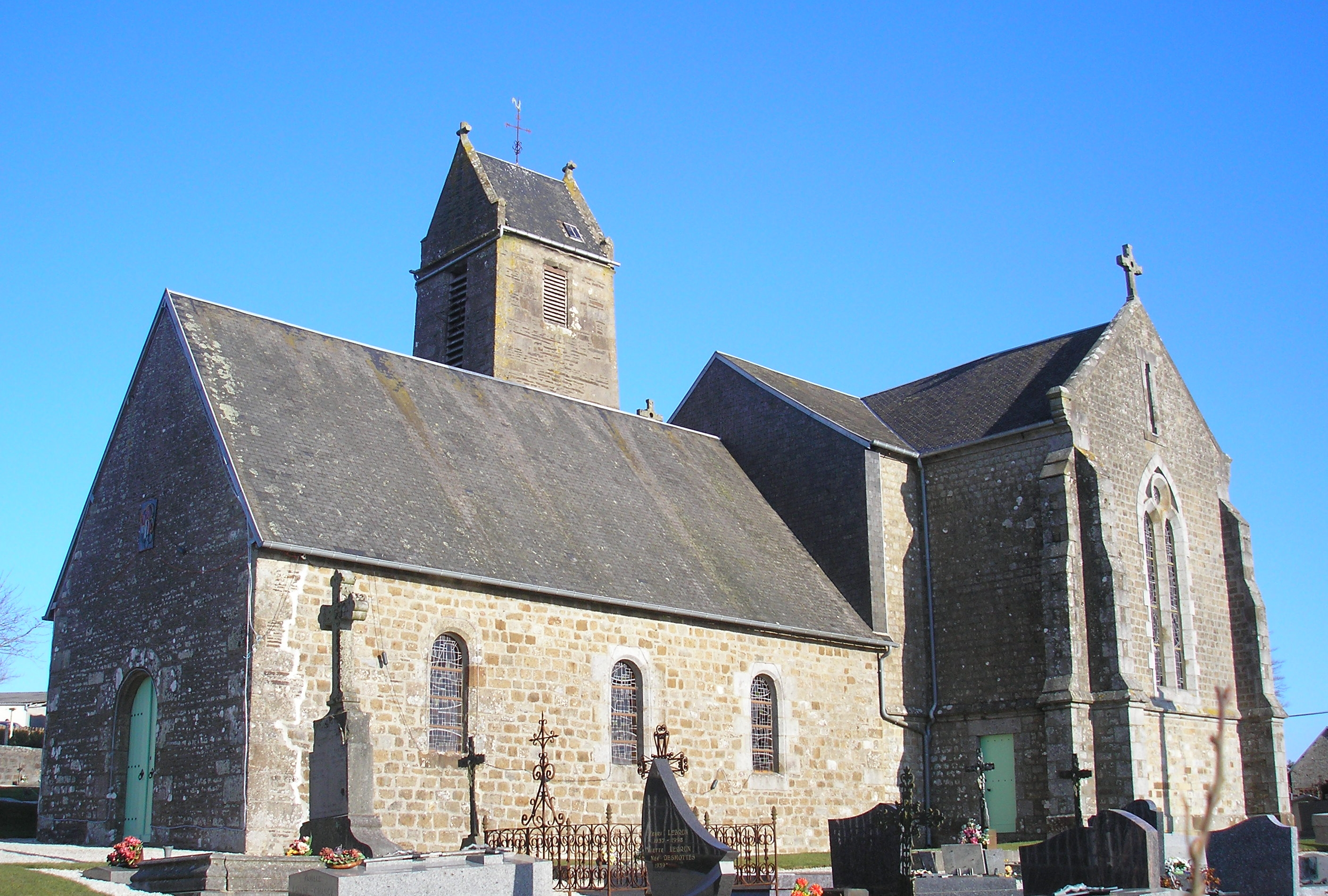
- The church of Sainte-Anne
- Location of Perriers-en-Beauficel
- Location within France Location within Normandy
- Coordinates: 48°44′16″N 0°59′44″W
- Country: France
- Region: Normandy
- Department: Manche
- Arrondissement: Avranches
- Canton: Le Mortainais
- Intercommunality: CA Mont-Saint-Michel-Normandie

Government
  - Mayor (2020–2026): Lydie Brionne
- Area^{1}: 9.30 km^{2} (3.59 sq mi)
- Elevation: 250 m (820 ft)
- Highest elevation: 331 m (1,086 ft)
- Lowest elevation: 75 m (246 ft)
- Population (2023): 207
  - Density: 22.3/km^{2} (57.6/sq mi)
- Time zone: UTC+01:00 (CET)
  - Summer (DST): UTC+02:00 (CEST)
- INSEE/Postal code: 50397 /50150
- ^{1} French Land Register data, which excludes lakes, ponds, glaciers > 1 km^{2} (0.386 sq mi or 247 acres) and river estuaries.

Perriers-en-Beauficel (French pronunciation: [pɛʁje ɑ̃ bofisɛl]) is a commune in the Manche department in Normandy in north-western France.

== See also ==
- Communes of the Manche department
