= Saint-Barthélemy, Manche =

Saint-Barthélemy
- Commune
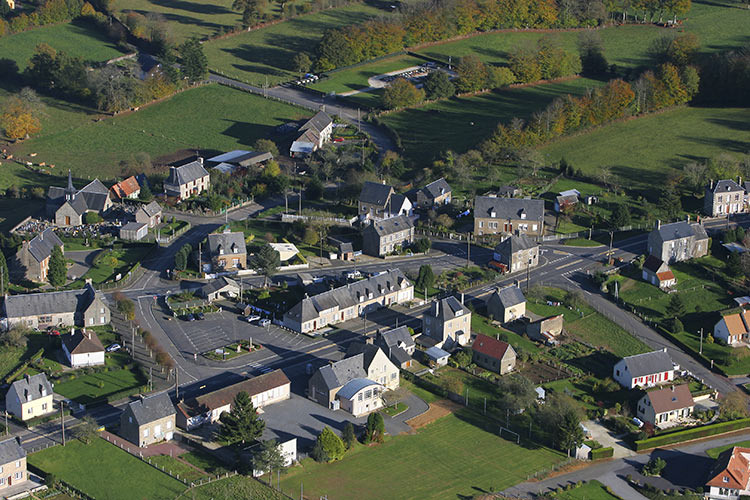
- Aerial view of the village
- Location of Saint-Barthélemy
- Location within France Location within Normandy
- Coordinates: 48°40′56″N 0°57′06″W
- Country: France
- Region: Normandy
- Department: Manche
- Arrondissement: Avranches
- Canton: Le Mortainais
- Intercommunality: CA Mont-Saint-Michel-Normandie

Government
  - Mayor (2020–2026): Eric Caillot
- Area^{1}: 6.81 km^{2} (2.63 sq mi)
- Elevation: 300 m (980 ft)
- Highest elevation: 308 m (1,010 ft)
- Lowest elevation: 165 m (541 ft)
- Population (2023): 342
  - Density: 50.2/km^{2} (130/sq mi)
- Time zone: UTC+01:00 (CET)
  - Summer (DST): UTC+02:00 (CEST)
- INSEE/Postal code: 50450 /50140
- ^{1} French Land Register data, which excludes lakes, ponds, glaciers > 1 km^{2} (0.386 sq mi or 247 acres) and river estuaries.

Saint-Barthélemy (French pronunciation: [sɛ̃ baʁtelemi]) is a commune in the Manche department in Normandy in north-western France.

== See also ==
- Communes of the Manche department
