= Saint-Jean-d'Elle =

- Commune
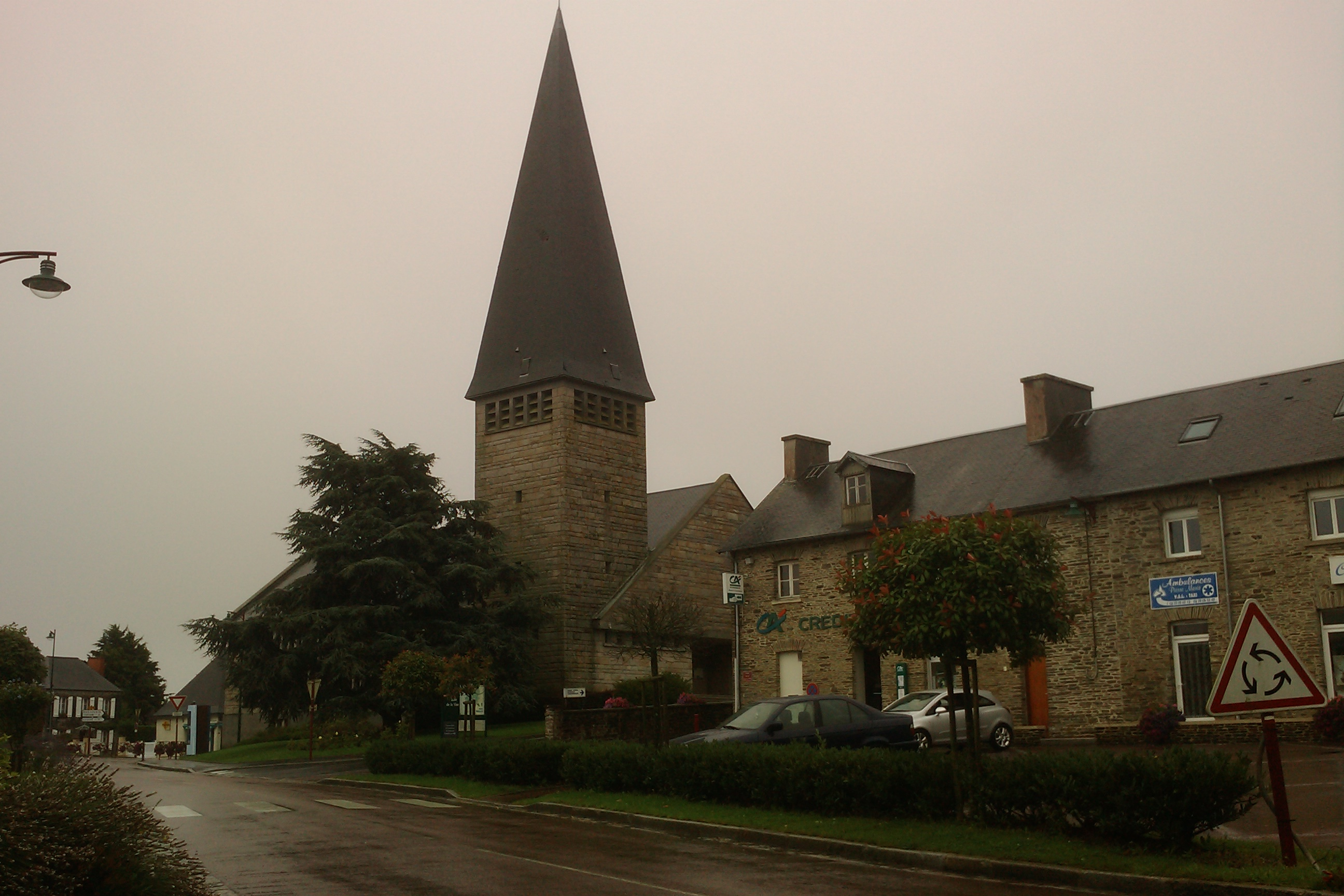
- The church in Saint-Jean-des-Baisants
- Location of Saint-Jean-d'Elle
- Location within France Location within Normandy
- Coordinates: 49°05′35″N 0°58′26″W
- Country: France
- Region: Normandy
- Department: Manche
- Arrondissement: Saint-Lô
- Canton: Condé-sur-Vire
- Intercommunality: Saint-Lô Agglo
- Area^{1}: 33.72 km^{2} (13.02 sq mi)
- Population (2023): 2,516
  - Density: 74.61/km^{2} (193.3/sq mi)
- Time zone: UTC+01:00 (CET)
  - Summer (DST): UTC+02:00 (CEST)
- INSEE/Postal code: 50492 /50810
- ^{1} French Land Register data, which excludes lakes, ponds, glaciers > 1 km^{2} (0.386 sq mi or 247 acres) and river estuaries.

Saint-Jean-d'Elle is a commune in the department of Manche, northwestern France. The municipality was established on 1 January 2016 by merger of the former communes of Notre-Dame-d'Elle, Précorbin, Rouxeville, Saint-Jean-des-Baisants (the seat) and Vidouville.

== Population ==
Population data refer to the area corresponding with the commune as of January 2025.

Historical population
Year	Pop.	±% p.a.
1968	1,581	—
1975	1,579	−0.02%
1982	1,686	+0.94%
1990	1,958	+1.89%
1999	1,961	+0.02%
2007	2,210	+1.51%
2012	2,394	+1.61%
2017	2,460	+0.55%
2023	2,516	+0.38%
Source: INSEE

== See also ==
- Communes of the Manche department
