= Notre-Dame-d'Elle =

- Part of Saint-Jean-d'Elle
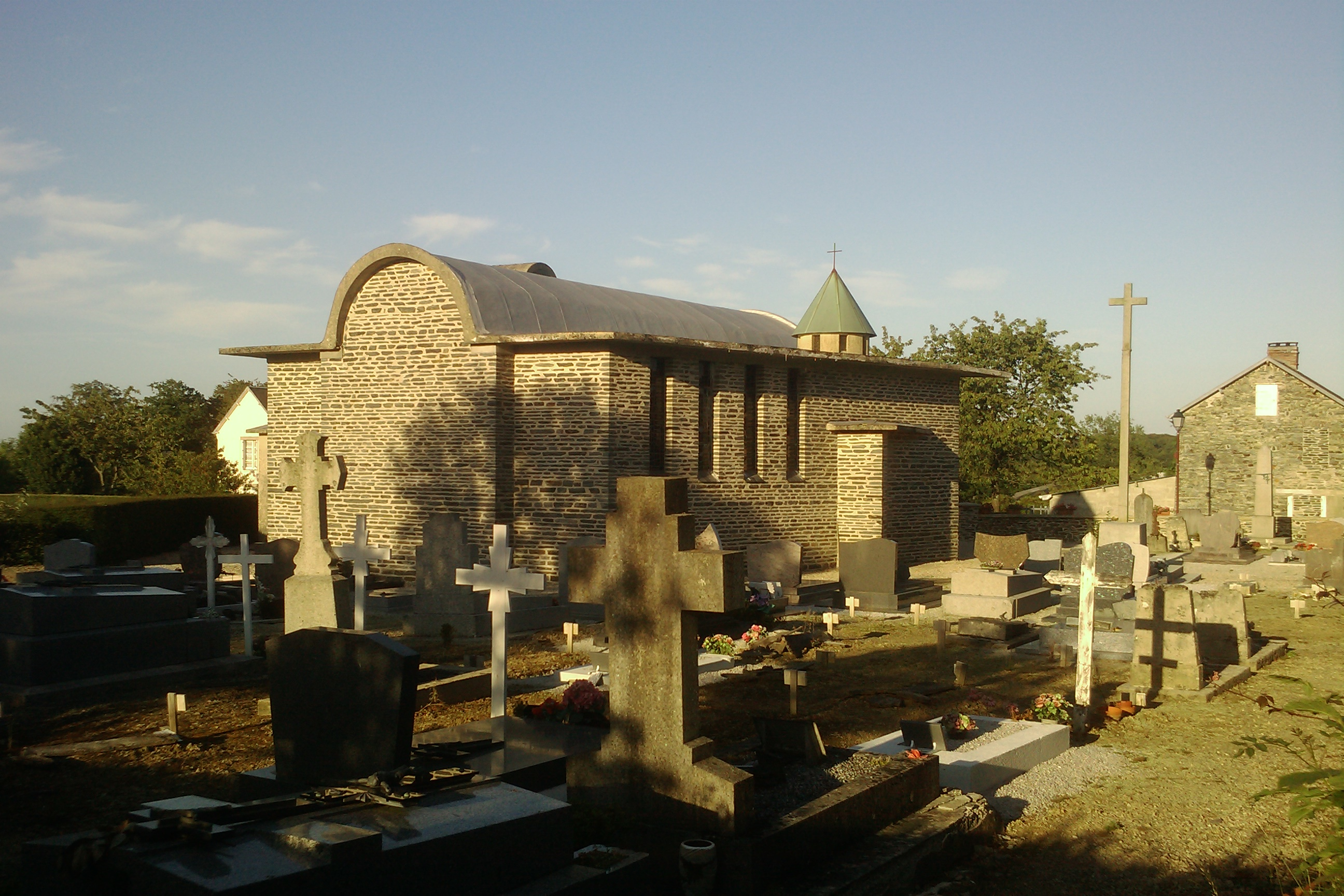
- Location of Notre-Dame-d'Elle
- Location within France Location within Normandy
- Coordinates: 49°06′42″N 0°57′31″W
- Country: France
- Region: Normandy
- Department: Manche
- Arrondissement: Saint-Lô
- Canton: Pont-Hébert
- Commune: Saint-Jean-d'Elle
- Area^{1}: 2.85 km^{2} (1.10 sq mi)
- Elevation: 150 m (490 ft)
- Highest elevation: 195 m (640 ft)
- Lowest elevation: 114 m (374 ft)
- Population (2022): 181
  - Density: 63.5/km^{2} (164/sq mi)
- Time zone: UTC+01:00 (CET)
  - Summer (DST): UTC+02:00 (CEST)
- Postal code: 50810
- ^{1} French Land Register data, which excludes lakes, ponds, glaciers > 1 km^{2} (0.386 sq mi or 247 acres) and river estuaries.

Notre-Dame-d'Elle (French pronunciation: [nɔtʁə dam dɛl]) is a former commune in the Manche department in Normandy in north-western France. On 1 January 2016, it was merged into the new commune of Saint-Jean-d'Elle.

== See also ==
- Communes of the Manche department
