= Beauficel =

- Commune
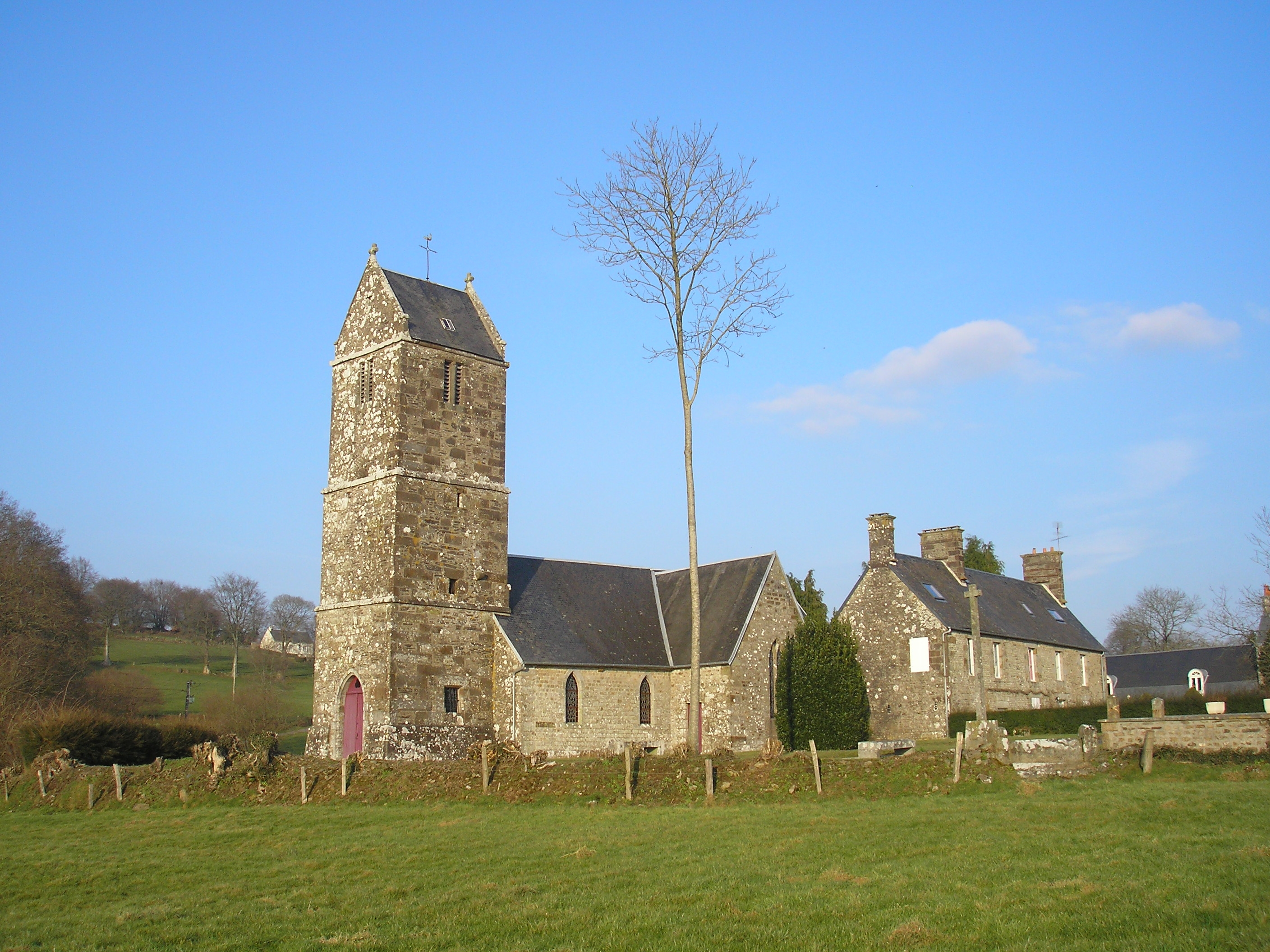
- The church of Saint-Pierre
- Location of Beauficel
- Location within France Location within Normandy
- Coordinates: 48°44′27″N 0°57′32″W
- Country: France
- Region: Normandy
- Department: Manche
- Arrondissement: Avranches
- Canton: Le Mortainais
- Intercommunality: CA Mont-Saint-Michel-Normandie

Government
  - Mayor (2020–2026): Martine Herbert
- Area^{1}: 9.13 km^{2} (3.53 sq mi)
- Highest elevation: 357 m (1,171 ft)
- Lowest elevation: 113 m (371 ft)
- Population (2023): 122
  - Density: 13.4/km^{2} (34.6/sq mi)
- Time zone: UTC+01:00 (CET)
  - Summer (DST): UTC+02:00 (CEST)
- INSEE/Postal code: 50040 /50150
- ^{1} French Land Register data, which excludes lakes, ponds, glaciers > 1 km^{2} (0.386 sq mi or 247 acres) and river estuaries.

Beauficel (French pronunciation: [bofisɛl]) is a commune in the Manche department in the Normandy region in northwestern France.

== Population ==
Historical population
Year	Pop.	±% p.a.
1968	293	—
1975	243	−2.64%
1982	225	−1.09%
1990	175	−3.09%
1999	163	−0.79%
2007	164	+0.08%
2012	160	−0.49%
2017	135	−3.34%
2023	122	−1.67%
Source: INSEE

== See also ==
- Communes of the Manche department
