= Brouains =

- Commune
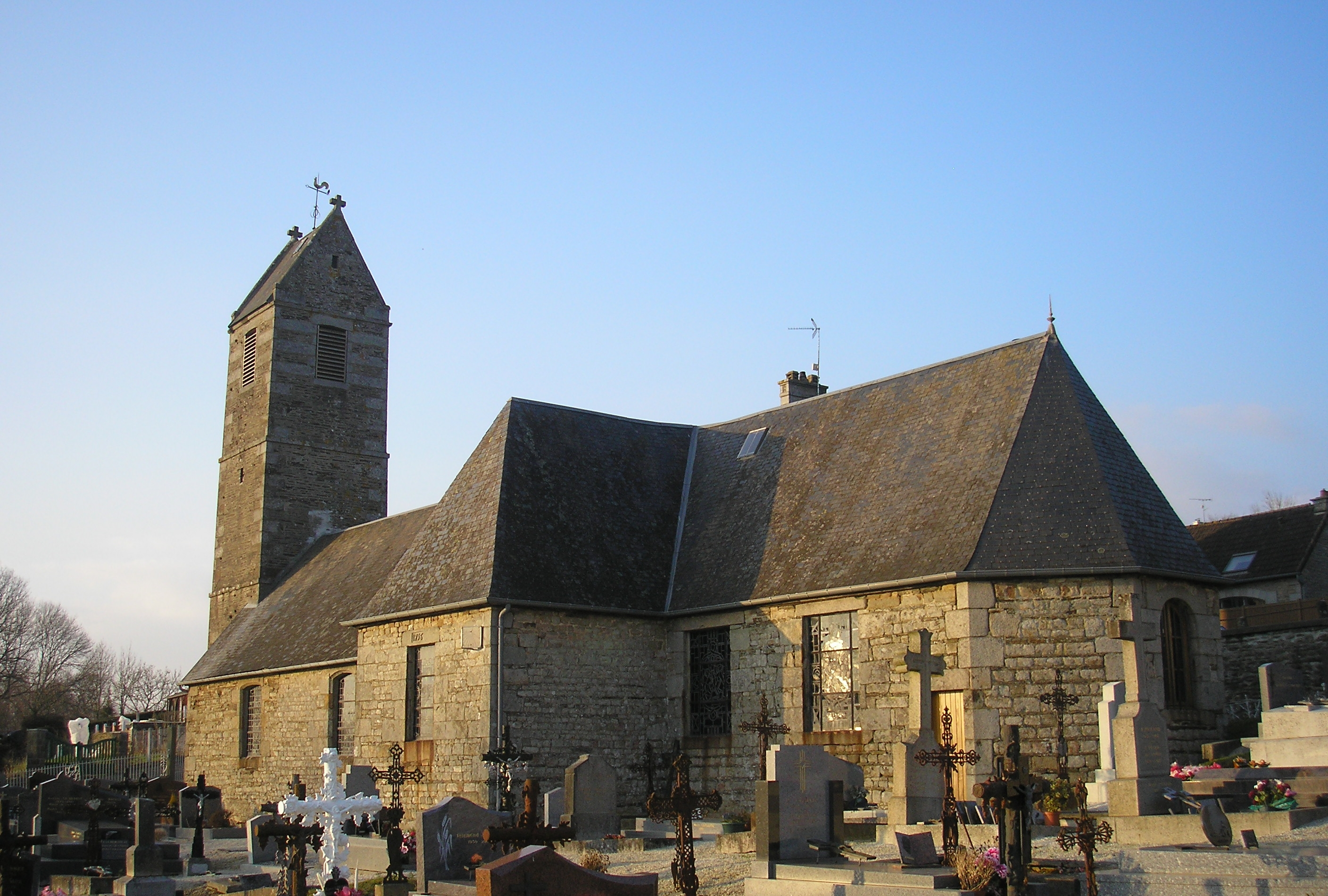
- The church of Notre-Dame
- Location of Brouains
- Location within France Location within Normandy
- Coordinates: 48°43′20″N 0°57′59″W
- Country: France
- Region: Normandy
- Department: Manche
- Arrondissement: Avranches
- Canton: Le Mortainais
- Intercommunality: CA Mont-Saint-Michel-Normandie

Government
  - Mayor (2020–2026): Bertrand Gilbert
- Area^{1}: 3.79 km^{2} (1.46 sq mi)
- Elevation: 145 m (476 ft)
- Highest elevation: 263 m (863 ft)
- Lowest elevation: 105 m (344 ft)
- Population (2023): 140
  - Density: 37/km^{2} (96/sq mi)
- Time zone: UTC+01:00 (CET)
  - Summer (DST): UTC+02:00 (CEST)
- INSEE/Postal code: 50088 /50150
- ^{1} French Land Register data, which excludes lakes, ponds, glaciers > 1 km^{2} (0.386 sq mi or 247 acres) and river estuaries.

Brouains (French pronunciation: [bʁuɛ̃]) is a commune in the Manche department in Normandy in northwestern France.

== Population ==
Historical population
Year	Pop.	±% p.a.
1968	330	—
1975	306	−1.07%
1982	260	−2.30%
1990	242	−0.89%
1999	213	−1.41%
2007	193	−1.22%
2012	181	−1.28%
2017	136	−5.56%
2023	140	+0.48%
Source: INSEE

== See also ==
- Communes of the Manche department
