= Le Neufbourg =

- Commune
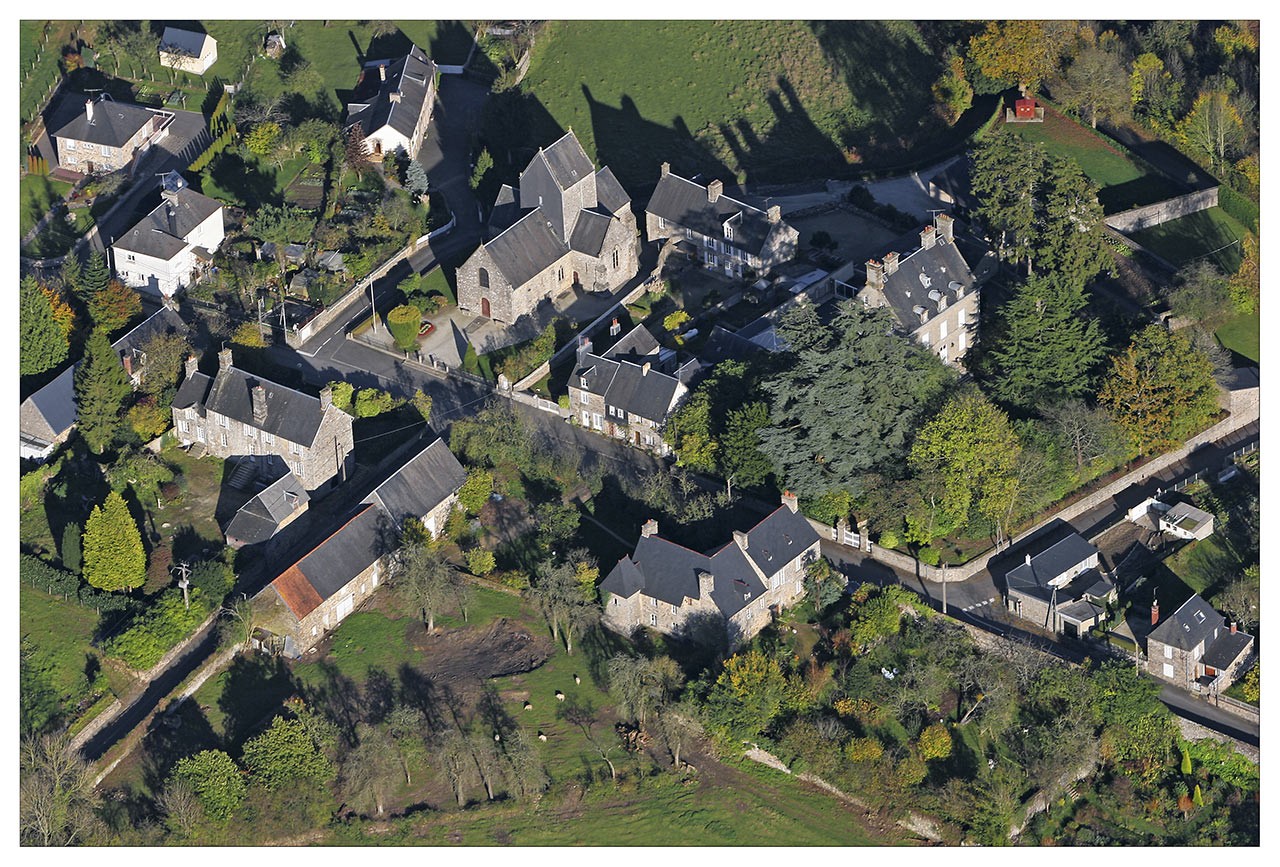
- Town aerial view
- Location of Le Neufbourg
- Location within France Location within Normandy
- Coordinates: 48°39′28″N 0°56′47″W
- Country: France
- Region: Normandy
- Department: Manche
- Arrondissement: Avranches
- Canton: Le Mortainais
- Intercommunality: CA Mont-Saint-Michel-Normandie

Government
  - Mayor (2020–2026): Daniel Binet
- Area^{1}: 2.25 km^{2} (0.87 sq mi)
- Elevation: 225 m (738 ft)
- Highest elevation: 286 m (938 ft)
- Lowest elevation: 160 m (520 ft)
- Population (2023): 397
  - Density: 176/km^{2} (457/sq mi)
- Demonym: Neufbourgeois
- Time zone: UTC+01:00 (CET)
  - Summer (DST): UTC+02:00 (CEST)
- INSEE/Postal code: 50371 /50140
- ^{1} French Land Register data, which excludes lakes, ponds, glaciers > 1 km^{2} (0.386 sq mi or 247 acres) and river estuaries.

Le Neufbourg (French pronunciation: [lə nøbuʁ]) is a commune in the Manche department in Normandy in north-western France.

== See also ==
- Communes of the Manche department
