= Précorbin =

- Part of Saint-Jean-d'Elle
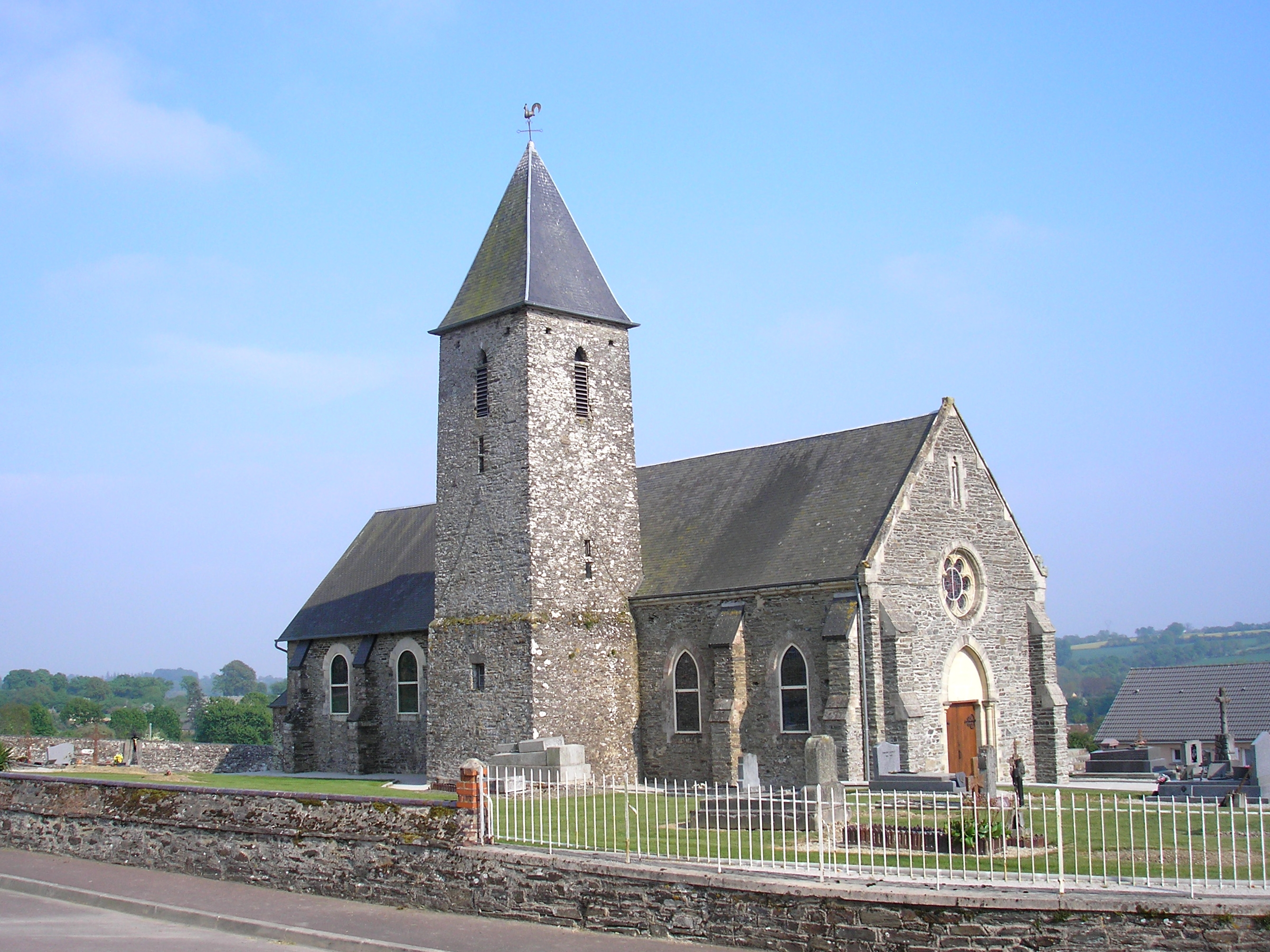
- The church of Saint-Aubin
- Location of Précorbin
- Location within France Location within Normandy
- Coordinates: 49°05′11″N 0°57′39″W
- Country: France
- Region: Normandy
- Department: Manche
- Arrondissement: Saint-Lô
- Canton: Condé-sur-Vire
- Commune: Saint-Jean-d'Elle
- Area^{1}: 7.21 km^{2} (2.78 sq mi)
- Highest elevation: 216 m (709 ft)
- Lowest elevation: 49 m (161 ft)
- Population (2022): 526
  - Density: 73.0/km^{2} (189/sq mi)
- Demonym: Praticorbiniens
- Time zone: UTC+01:00 (CET)
  - Summer (DST): UTC+02:00 (CEST)
- Postal code: 50810
- ^{1} French Land Register data, which excludes lakes, ponds, glaciers > 1 km^{2} (0.386 sq mi or 247 acres) and river estuaries.

Précorbin (French pronunciation: [pʁekɔʁbɛ̃]) is a former commune in the Manche department in Normandy in north-western France. On 1 January 2016, it was merged into the new commune of Saint-Jean-d'Elle.

== See also ==
- Communes of the Manche department
