= Mortain-Bocage =

- Commune
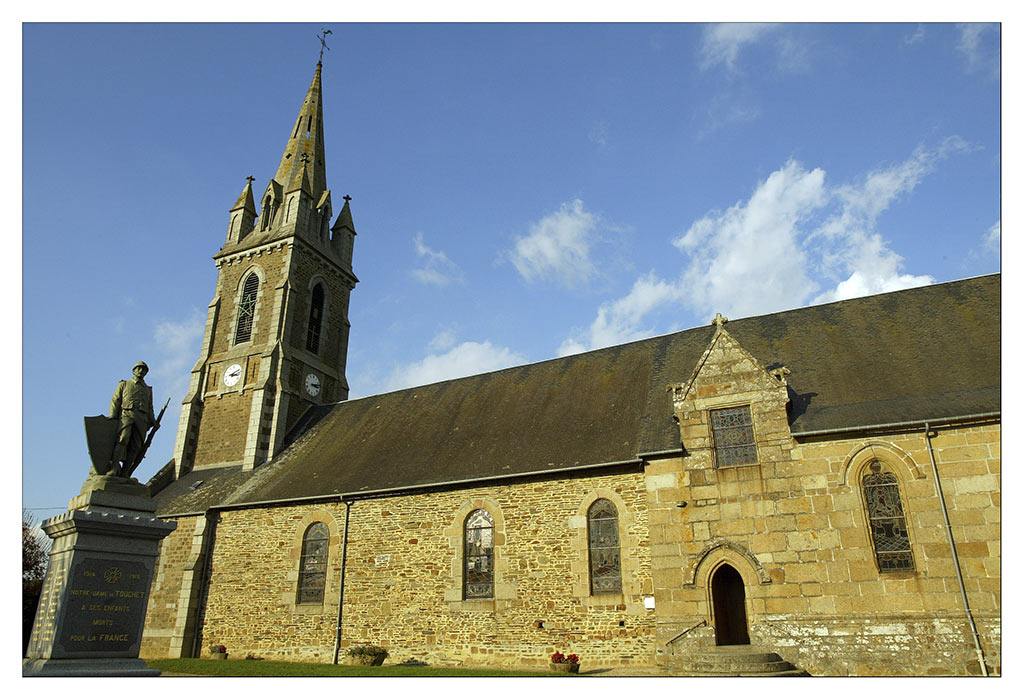
- The church in Notre-Dame-Du-Touchet
- Location of Mortain-Bocage
- Location within France Location within Normandy
- Coordinates: 48°38′56″N 0°56′28″W
- Country: France
- Region: Normandy
- Department: Manche
- Arrondissement: Avranches
- Canton: Le Mortainais
- Intercommunality: CA Mont-Saint-Michel-Normandie

Government
  - Mayor (2020–2026): Hervé Desserouer
- Area^{1}: 62.63 km^{2} (24.18 sq mi)
- Population (2023): 2,961
  - Density: 47.28/km^{2} (122.4/sq mi)
- Time zone: UTC+01:00 (CET)
  - Summer (DST): UTC+02:00 (CEST)
- INSEE/Postal code: 50359 /50140
- ^{1} French Land Register data, which excludes lakes, ponds, glaciers > 1 km^{2} (0.386 sq mi or 247 acres) and river estuaries.

Mortain-Bocage (French pronunciation: [mɔʁtɛ̃ bɔkaʒ]) is a commune in the department of Manche, northwestern France. The municipality was established on 1 January 2016 by merger of the former communes of Bion, Mortain (the seat), Notre-Dame-du-Touchet, Saint-Jean-du-Corail and Villechien.

== Population ==
Population data refer to the area corresponding with the commune as of January 2025.

Historical population
Year	Pop.	±% p.a.
1968	4,314	—
1975	4,461	+0.48%
1982	4,401	−0.19%
1990	4,126	−0.80%
1999	3,770	−1.00%
2007	3,363	−1.42%
2012	3,171	−1.17%
2017	2,942	−1.49%
2023	2,961	+0.11%
Source: INSEE

== See also ==
- Communes of the Manche department
