= Rouxeville =

- Part of Saint-Jean-d'Elle
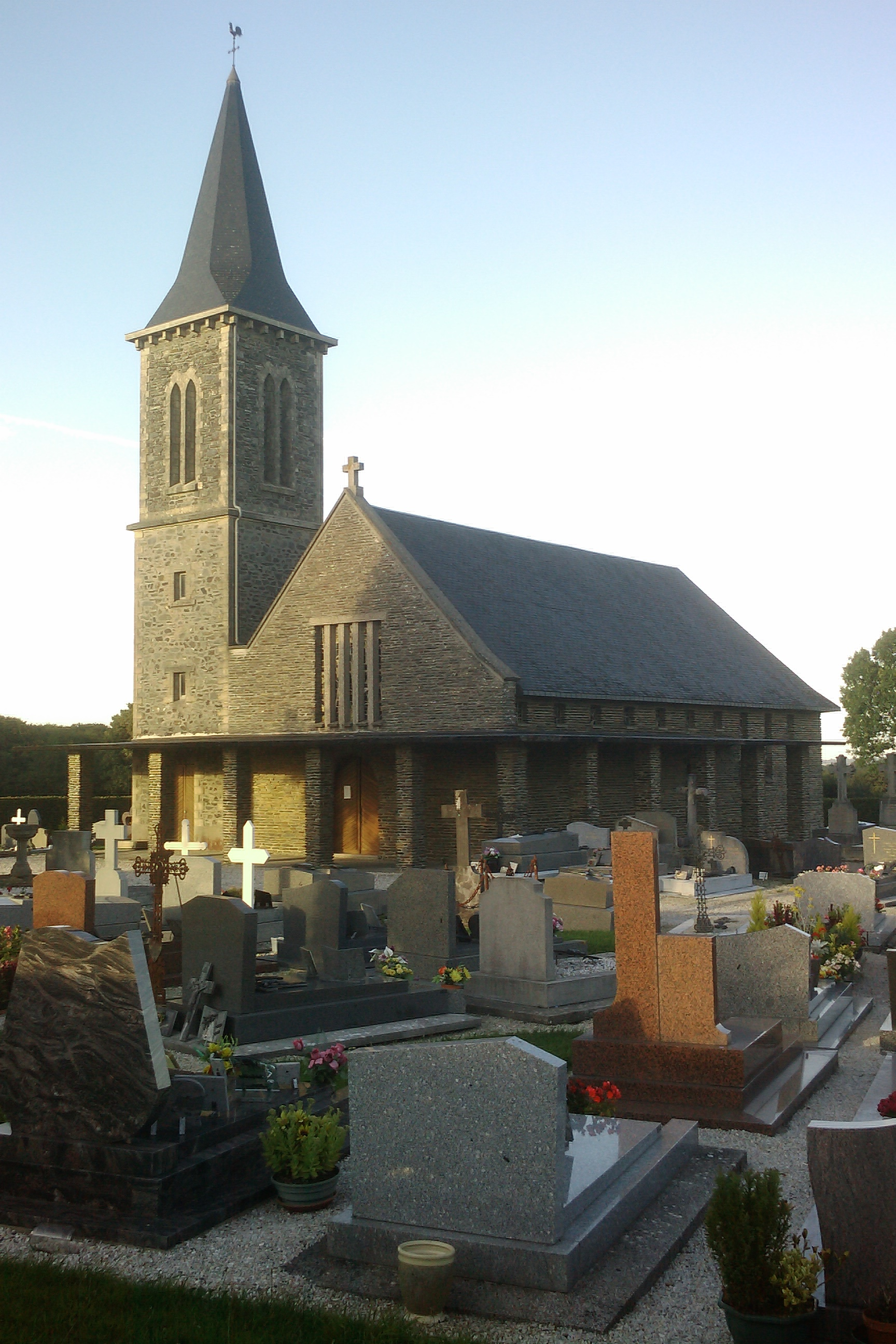
- The church of Saint-Martin
- Location of Rouxeville
- Location within France Location within Normandy
- Coordinates: 49°06′07″N 0°56′48″W
- Country: France
- Region: Normandy
- Department: Manche
- Arrondissement: Saint-Lô
- Canton: Condé-sur-Vire
- Commune: Saint-Jean-d'Elle
- Area^{1}: 5.83 km^{2} (2.25 sq mi)
- Elevation: 176 m (577 ft)
- Highest elevation: 199 m (653 ft)
- Lowest elevation: 99 m (325 ft)
- Population (2022): 388
  - Density: 66.6/km^{2} (172/sq mi)
- Demonym: Rouxevillais
- Time zone: UTC+01:00 (CET)
  - Summer (DST): UTC+02:00 (CEST)
- Postal code: 50810
- ^{1} French Land Register data, which excludes lakes, ponds, glaciers > 1 km^{2} (0.386 sq mi or 247 acres) and river estuaries.

Rouxeville (French pronunciation: [ʁuksəvil]) is a former commune in the Manche department in Normandy in north-western France. On 1 January 2016, it was merged into the new commune of Saint-Jean-d'Elle.

== See also ==
- Communes of the Manche department
