= Saint-Jean-des-Baisants =

- Part of Saint-Jean-d'Elle
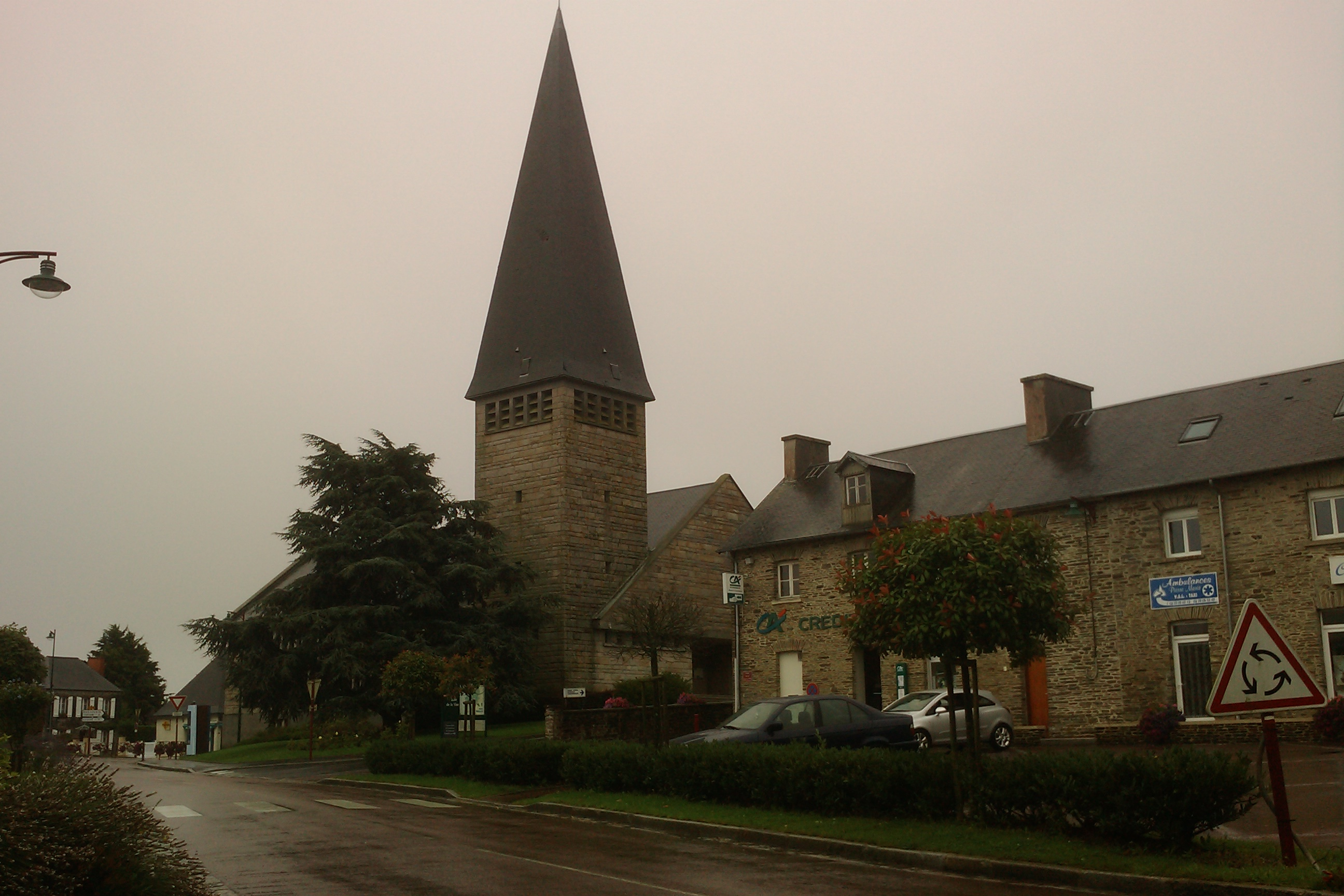
- The village and its church of Saint-Jean-Baptiste
- Location of Saint-Jean-des-Baisants
- Location within France Location within Normandy
- Coordinates: 49°05′38″N 0°58′23″W
- Country: France
- Region: Normandy
- Department: Manche
- Arrondissement: Saint-Lô
- Canton: Condé-sur-Vire
- Commune: Saint-Jean-d'Elle
- Area^{1}: 13.37 km^{2} (5.16 sq mi)
- Highest elevation: 217 m (712 ft)
- Lowest elevation: 50 m (160 ft)
- Population (2022): 1,298
  - Density: 97.08/km^{2} (251.4/sq mi)
- Time zone: UTC+01:00 (CET)
  - Summer (DST): UTC+02:00 (CEST)
- Postal code: 50810
- ^{1} French Land Register data, which excludes lakes, ponds, glaciers > 1 km^{2} (0.386 sq mi or 247 acres) and river estuaries.

Saint-Jean-des-Baisants (French pronunciation: [sɛ̃ ʒɑ̃ de bɛzɑ̃]) is a former commune in the Manche department in Normandy in north-western France. On 1 January 2016, it was merged into the new commune of Saint-Jean-d'Elle.

== See also ==
- Communes of the Manche department
