= Gathemo =

- Commune
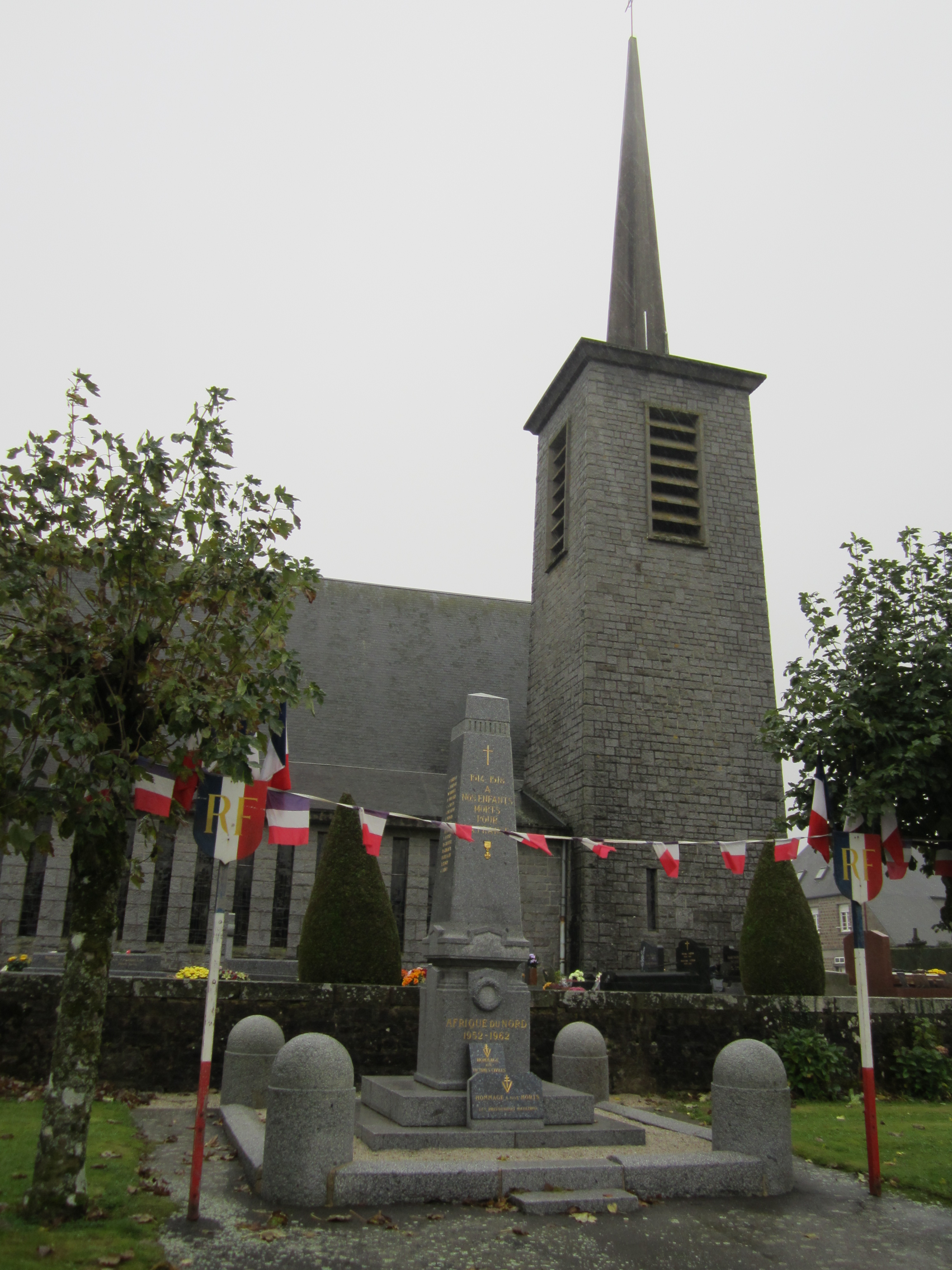
- The church of Notre-Dame

- Coat of arms
- Location of Gathemo
- Location within France Location within Normandy
- Coordinates: 48°45′58″N 0°58′29″W
- Country: France
- Region: Normandy
- Department: Manche
- Arrondissement: Avranches
- Canton: Le Mortainais
- Intercommunality: CA Mont-Saint-Michel-Normandie

Government
  - Mayor (2020–2026): Christelle Errard
- Area^{1}: 10.41 km^{2} (4.02 sq mi)
- Highest elevation: 367 m (1,204 ft)
- Lowest elevation: 230 m (750 ft)
- Population (2023): 265
  - Density: 25.5/km^{2} (65.9/sq mi)
- Time zone: UTC+01:00 (CET)
  - Summer (DST): UTC+02:00 (CEST)
- INSEE/Postal code: 50195 /50150
- ^{1} French Land Register data, which excludes lakes, ponds, glaciers > 1 km^{2} (0.386 sq mi or 247 acres) and river estuaries.

Gathemo (French pronunciation: [ɡatmo]) is a commune in the Manche department in north-western France.

== See also ==
- Communes of the Manche department
