= Canton of Le Mortainais =

Coordinates: 48.65°N 0.94°W

The canton of Le Mortainais is an administrative division of the Manche department, northwestern France. It was created at the French canton reorganisation which came into effect in March 2015. Its seat is in Mortain-Bocage.

It consists of the following communes:

1. Barenton
2. Beauficel
3. Brouains
4. Chaulieu
5. Le Fresne-Poret
6. Gathemo
7. Ger
8. Mortain-Bocage
9. Le Neufbourg
10. Perriers-en-Beauficel
11. Romagny-Fontenay
12. Saint-Barthélemy
13. Saint-Clément-Rancoudray
14. Saint-Cyr-du-Bailleul
15. Saint-Georges-de-Rouelley
16. Sourdeval
17. Le Teilleul
