= Studland Armco Pillbox =

Pillbox in Studland, Dorset, England

- Studland Bay, Dorset in United Kingdom
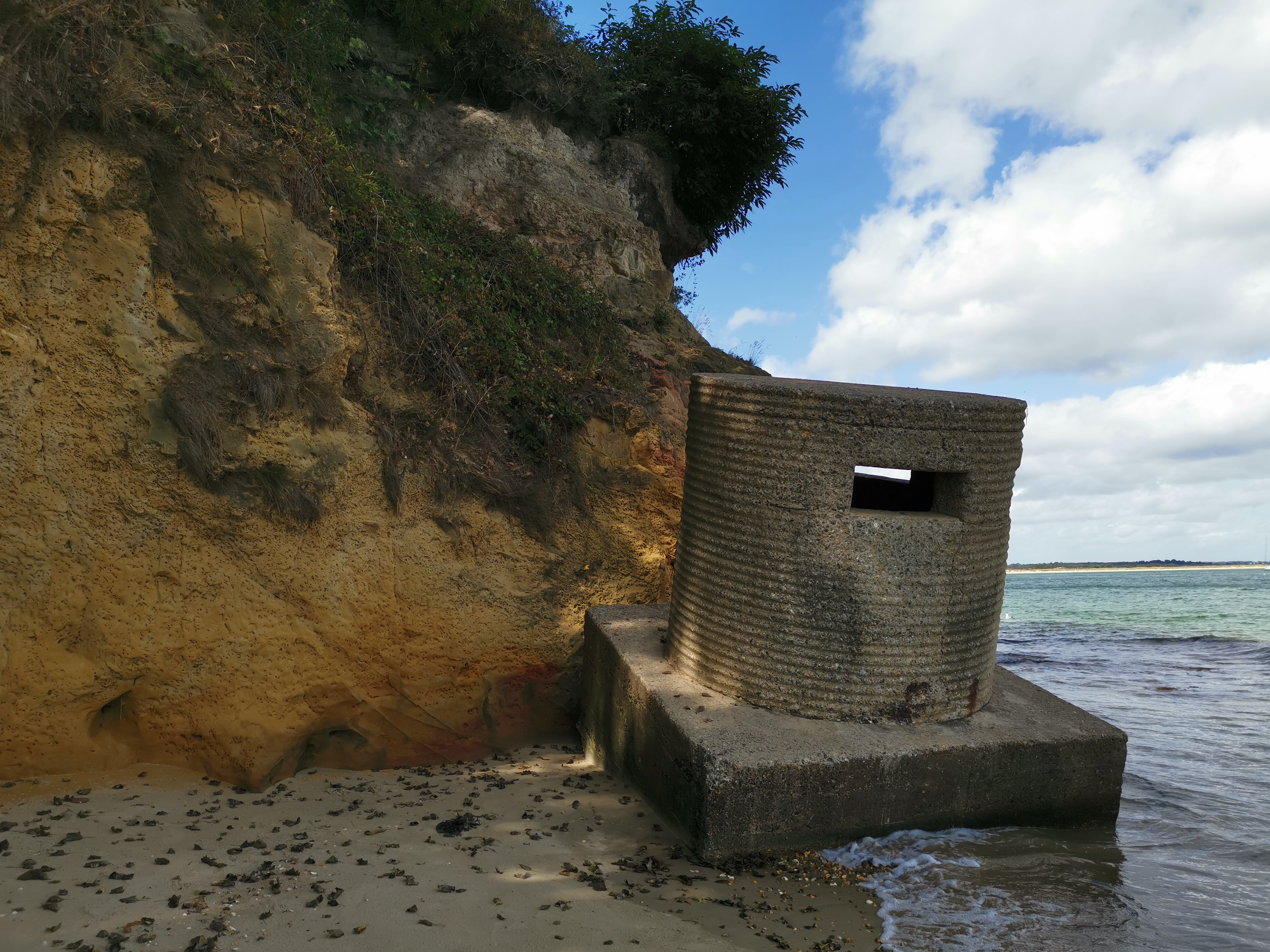
- The Type 25 pillbox on Studland Beach

Site information
- Type: Pillbox (FW3 Type 25)
- Owner: National Trust
- Open to the public: Yes
- Condition: Disused

Location
- Coordinates: 50°38′34″N 1°56′41″W
- Area: 9 square metres (97 sq ft)
- Height: 2.1 metres (6 ft 11 in)
- Length: 3.0 metres (9.8 ft)

Site history
- Built: c. July - August 1940
- Built by: 240 Field Company RE
- In use: August 1940 - c. 1941
- Materials: Reinforced concrete with corrugated iron shuttering

Listed Building
- Reference no.: 1411813
- Grade: II

The Studland Armco Pillbox, also known as the Pillbox below Redend Point, is a Grade II listed Second World War Type 25 Armco pillbox, located on the beach at Studland Bay, Dorset, England. Manufactured by the Engineering & Metals Company, it rests on the beach below Fort Henry.

== History ==
The pillbox was constructed in July 1940 as part of the rapid coastal defence preparations following the fall of France. It was a key component of the Studland Defence Area, a sector considered vulnerable to German amphibious assault due to the bay's wide sandy beaches.

The structure was built to a Type FW3/25 design. This was a commercial variant of the standard British hardened field defences. Unlike the more common Type 22 or Type 24 pillboxes the Type 25 was circular and contained corrugated iron Armco sheets as permanent shuttering. This design was intended to be quicker to assemble than traditional timber-framed concrete structures. During the war the pillbox was manned by regular British Army units. It was positioned to provide interlocking fields of fire with nearby fortifications.

August 1941 RAF aerial photographs confirm that the current position of the pillbox is its original location. In 2012 the structure was granted Grade II listed status by Historic England.
