= 741st Tank Battalion (United States) =

- Active: 1942 – 45; 1949 – 52
- Country: United States
- Branch: United States Army
- Type: Tank/armor
- Size: Battalion
- Part of: Independent unit
- Mottos: Strenue et Audactor (Strenuously and Bravely)
- Equipment: M4 Sherman, M5 Stuart
- Campaign credit: World War II: Normandy with Arrowhead; Northern France; Rhineland; Ardennes-Alsace; Central Europe

Insignia
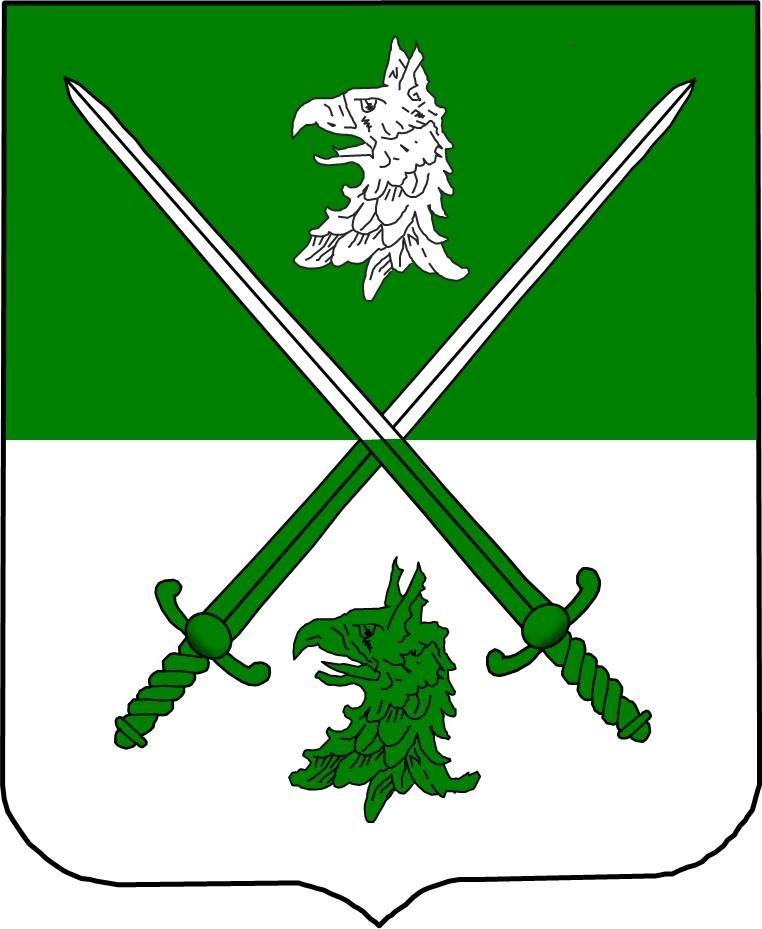
- Distinctive unit insignia

The 741st Tank Battalion was an independent tank battalion that participated in the European Theater of Operations with the United States Army in World War II. The battalion participated in combat operations throughout northern Europe until V-E Day. It was one of five tank battalions (all independent) that landed in Normandy on D-Day (6 June 1944). It landed on Omaha Beach supporting the 1st Infantry Division, but was attached to 2d Infantry Division on 15 June 1944, which it supported for most of the remainder of the war. The battalion played a key role in blunting the northern flank of the German attack during the Battle of the Bulge in December 1944. The 741st Tank Battalion advanced as far as Plzeň, Czechoslovakia by the end of the war.

The battalion was inactivated in October 1945, then briefly reactivated in 1949 as a reserve unit assigned to the 96th Infantry Division. It was withdrawn from the 96th Infantry Division and inactivated in 1952.

== Organization ==
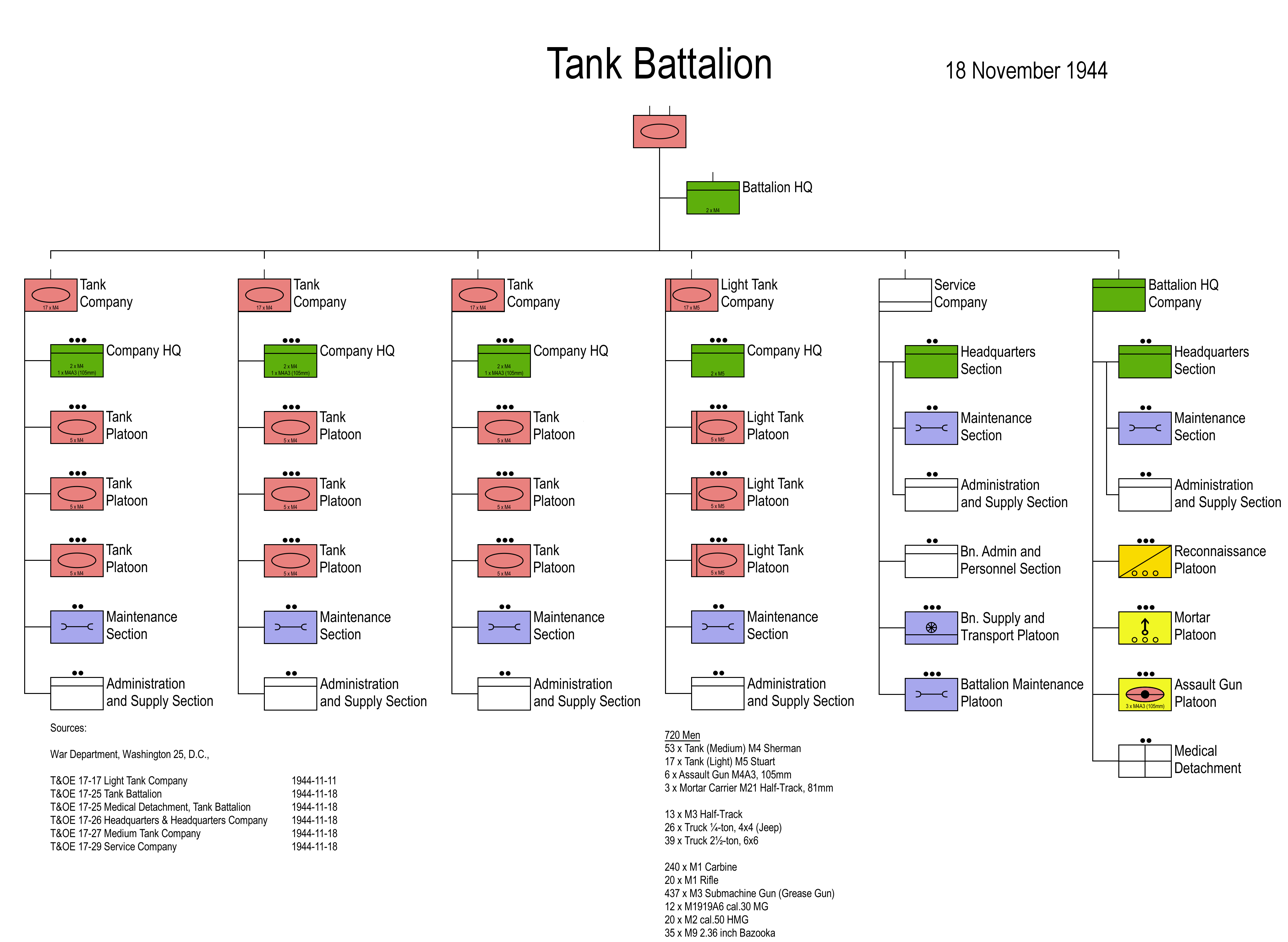
World War II Tank Battalion Structure - November 1944.

The 741st Tank Battalion followed the standard organization of a U.S. medium tank battalion during World War II. It consisted of a Headquarters and Headquarters Company, Service Company, three medium tank companies (Companies A, B, and C) and a light tank company (Company D).

The Headquarters Company included the battalion headquarters staff, both officers and enlisted men; an assault gun platoon, consisting of three Sherman tank variants armed with a short-barreled 105 mm assault gun, and an additional three assault guns nominally assigned to each medium tank company, but normally operating as a second gun section in the assault gun platoon; a mortar platoon, equipped with three half-track mounted 81 mm mortars; a reconnaissance platoon with five quarter-ton "peeps" (jeeps); and the headquarters tank section, consisting of two tanks, one each for the battalion commander and the operations officer. The assault gun platoon was frequently attached to the artillery of the division to which the battalion was attached, especially if the division had to revert to defense or static positions.

The Service Company included a headquarters section; a maintenance platoon; and a large battalion supply and transportation platoon, with over 30 trucks to provide logistics for the battalion.

Companies A, B, C, and D – the tank line companies, both medium and light, all followed the same table of organization. Each company consisted of a headquarters section which, along with a small headquarters staff, also included two tanks (one for the company commander and one for the executive officer); and three five-tank platoons. The medium tank companies were equipped with M4 Sherman tanks, while the light tank company was equipped with M5 Stuart tanks. All four companies had their own maintenance section, which included an M32 Tank Recovery Vehicle, built on a Sherman chassis. Because the Stuart carried a 4-man crew versus a 5-man crew on the Sherman, it had a somewhat smaller personnel strength than the medium tank companies. For the Normandy landings, Companies B and C were equipped with DD tanks. As virtually all these tanks were lost during the assault on D-Day, they were replaced with conventional M4 Shermans as soon as the battalion began receiving replacement equipment.

== History ==
=== Activation and deployment ===
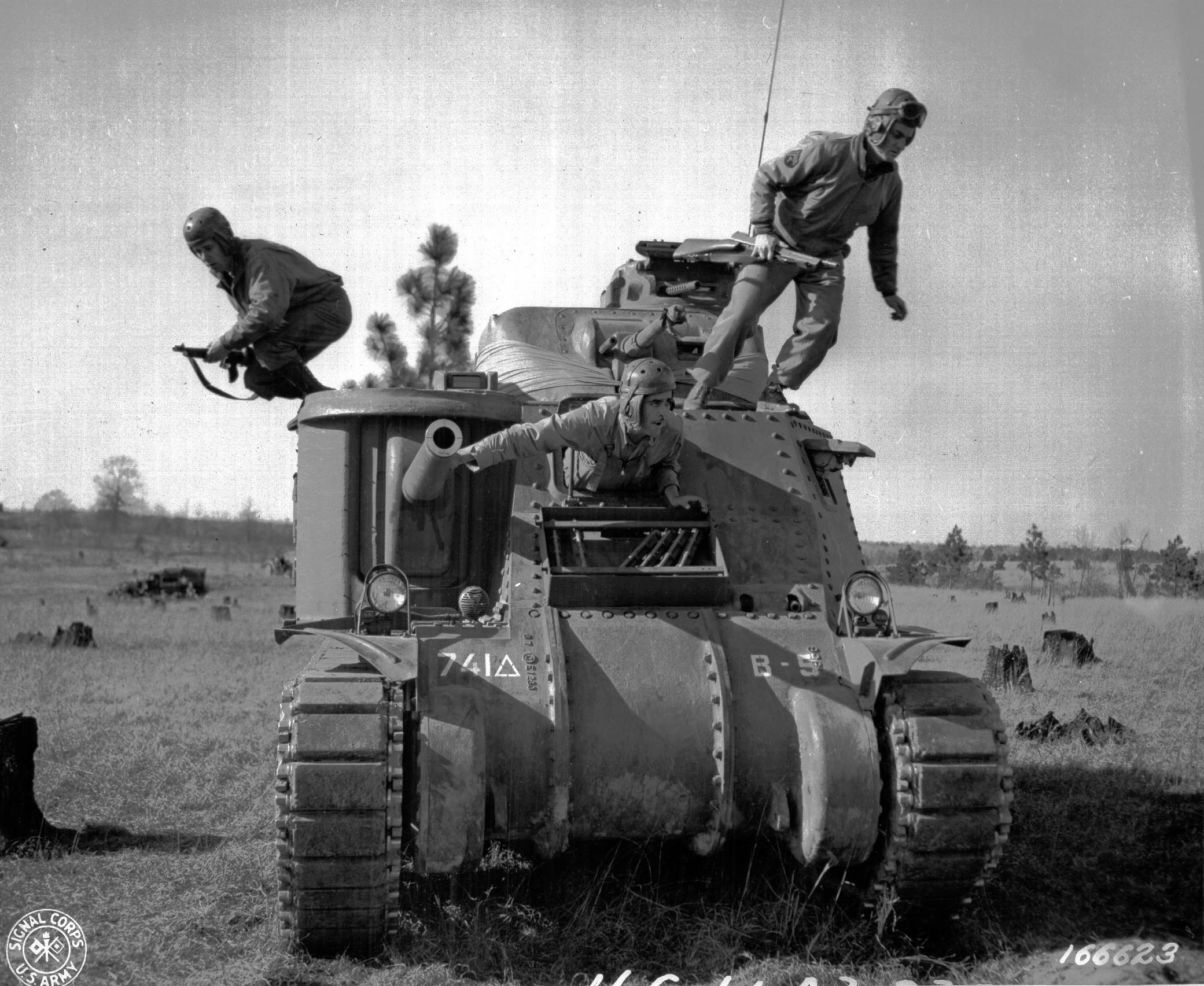
Crew from Company B, 741st Tank Battalion abandons its M3 Grant tank during the Third Army Louisiana Maneuvers at Fort Polk, Louisiana, 12 February 1943. These tanks were replaced by M4 Shermans before the battalion entered combat in France. (U.S. Army Signal Corps)

The 741st Tank Battalion was activated at Fort Meade, Maryland, on 15 March 1942. Its initial cadre was formed from members of the 751st Tank Battalion and complemented by draftees. The battalion criss-crossed the country as it moved from one training station to another developing its maneuver and gunnery skills. Training camps included Camp Young, California, Camp Polk, Louisiana, Camp Pickett, Virginia, and Camp Wellfleet, Massachusetts. At Camp Bradford, Virginia, it also began practicing amphibious training, including loading and unloading aboard Navy craft, and practice assault landings at Little Creek, Virginia and Solomons Island, Maryland.

Finally, in August 1943, the battalion arrived at Fort Dix, New Jersey, to make final pre-embarkations preparations. From there, the battalion moved to the embarkation station at Camp Shanks, and boarded the Capetown Castle, departing New York on 20 October 1943 and arriving at Liverpool, England on 2 November 1943.

The battalion continued its training in England, where it was selected to become part of the D-Day assault force. Training first with British Valentine tanks specially equipped with the duplex drive amphibious propulsion system beginning in January 1944, they later received similarly equipped M4s with which to continue training. The units loaded out their equipment in late May and waited in port for the final order for the assault landings.

=== D-Day landings and Normandy ===
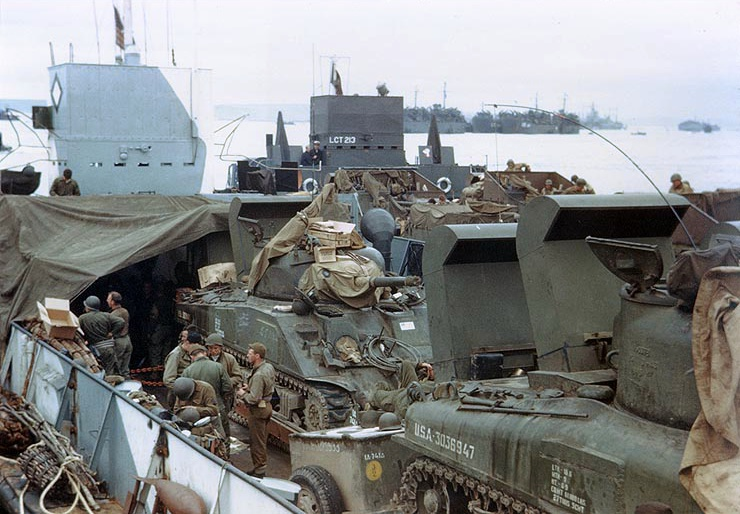
Tanks of Company A, 741st Tank Battalion, loaded aboard an LCT, awaiting departure for D-Day invasion, early June 1944. Note the extended air intakes to allow deep water fording while coming ashore during the landings. (U.S. Army Signal Corps)

For D-Day, the battalion was attached to the 1st Infantry Division to support the 16th Infantry Regimental Combat Team landings on Omaha Beach. Company A was equipped with Deep Wading M4 Sherman tanks, while Companies B and C were equipped with the amphibious Sherman DD tanks. Company D, equipped with M5 light tanks, and the battalion headquarters were not part of the initial landing force. The Company A tanks, along with a platoon of bulldozer-blade equipped Shermans, were brought ashore by LCTs, while the DD tanks were launched from about 6,000 yards offshore, which was considerably further out than originally planned, and in rougher seas than those in which the unit had trained, resulting in the loss of 27 of the 32 DD tanks before they reached shore. Only two of the launched DD tanks reached the beach; another three were carried ashore when their LCT was unable to lower its ramp at sea. By the end of D-Day, the battalion had three combat ready tanks; 48 had either been sunk or destroyed in combat. Personnel losses were nearly as high, with 45 men killed and another 60 wounded during the day's action. For its actions on Omaha Beach on 6–7 June, the battalion was awarded the Presidential Unit Citation.

After its initial assault and consolidation of the beachhead with the 1st Infantry Division in Normandy, the battalion was detached from the 1st Infantry Division on 15 June and attached to the 2nd Infantry Division. The initial coordination of the tanks with the infantry units as they began to fight inland in the bocage country of Normandy was not well executed and both infantry and tanks suffered casualties until the tactics and procedures of operating together were put in place. The tankers practiced with infantry and engineers at the platoon and tank/squad level for the remainder of June to perfect their techniques in working together. During this period, the battalion suffered numerous equipment losses due to tanks mired in the soft boggy soil; and personnel casualties as well, due to artillery barrages when the crews had to abandon the mired tanks.

=== Breakout ===
The 741st led the 2nd Infantry Division's assault on Hill 192 on 11–12 July in the breakout from Normandy. Hill 192, the dominant terrain east of St. Lô, had to be taken in order for the American forces to liberate St. Lõ and establish an organized front line from which to launch Operation Cobra. After taking Hill 192, the 2nd Infantry Division went on the defensive until the start of Operation Cobra. On 26 July, the 2nd Infantry Division, with the 741st Tank Battalion continuing to provide direct fire support, advanced slowly, anchoring the left flank of the main assault of Operation Cobra, which took place to the west of St. Lõ. The division and the 741st advanced together as far as Tinchebray before new orders temporarily sent them on divergent paths. The 2nd Infantry Division was withdrawn from the line in order to reduce the fortress at Brest while the 741st Tank Battalion reverted to 3rd Armored Group control, under whose direction the battalion raced across western France to the outskirts of Paris at Sceaux. On 27 August, it was attached to the 28th Infantry Division in order to participate with the division in the Liberation Day Parade through Paris on 29 August, a tumultuous procession around the Arc de Triomphe and down the Champs-Élysées just four days after the Germans had formally surrendered the city. After a brief two-day respite, the battalion was on the march again; this time through Compiègne, the Aisne valley and Belgian Luxembourg and into the Duchy of Luxembourg, reaching the West Wall in Germany by 9 September in the vicinity of Sevenig and Roscheid. On 2 October, the 741st Tank Battalion was relieved from attachment to the 28th Infantry Division and again attached to the 2nd Infantry Division, with which it remained until the end of the war.

=== Battle of the Bulge ===
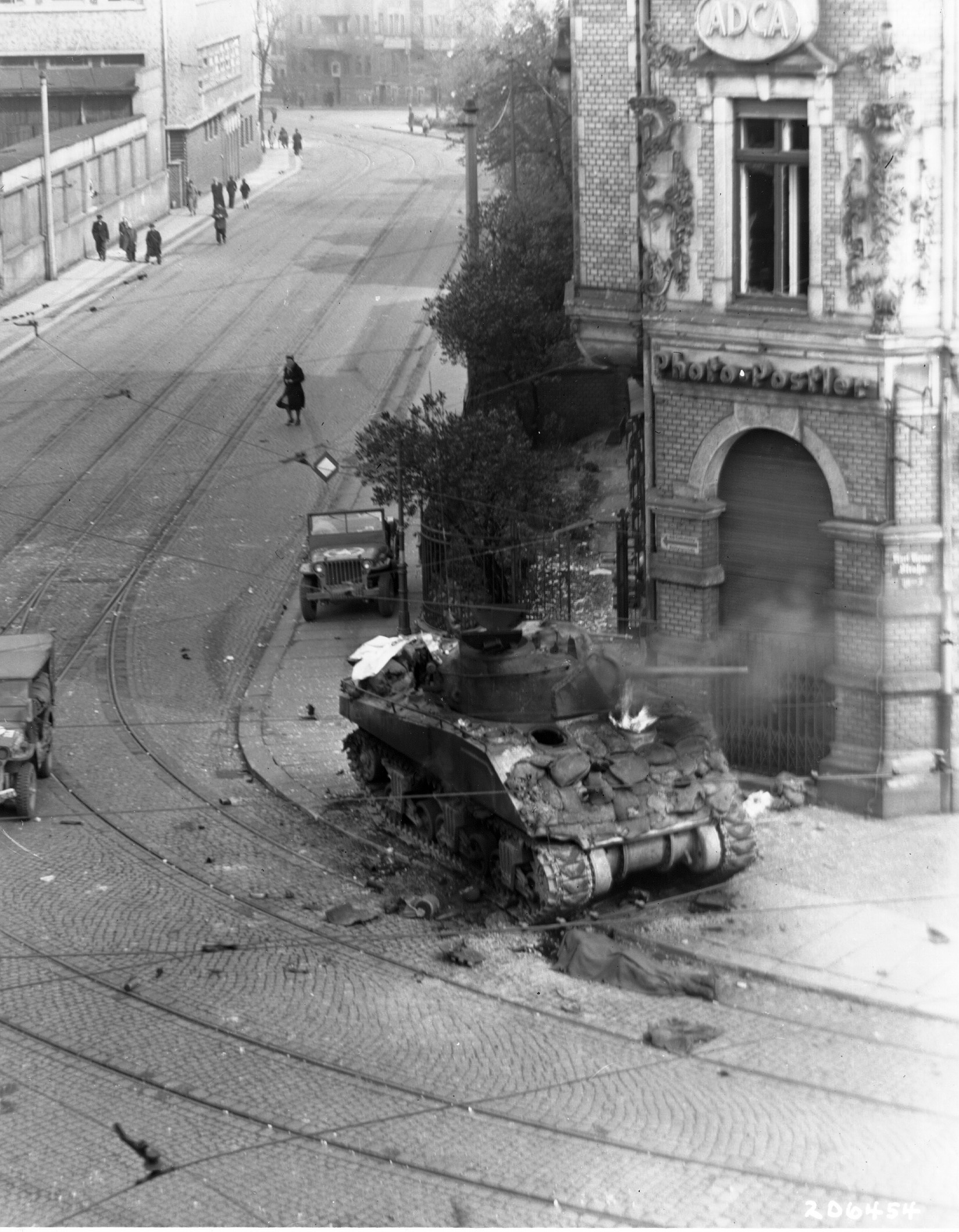
M4 tank of Sgt. George K. Cuthbert, Jr., Company C, 741st Tank Battalion, burns at the intersection of Karl Heine Str. and Zschochersche Str., Leipzig, Germany, 18 April 1945 after being hit by a Panzerfaust. The entire crew (Note: Sgt. George K. Cuthbert, Jr, Cpl. Kenneth W. Nickel, Pfc. Charles Lombardo, Pfc. George R. Wilson, and Pfc. William E. Glatt.) perished in the battle. The company was attached to the 23rd Infantry Regiment, 2nd Infantry Division. (T/5 R. W. Crampton)

In support of the 2nd and 99th Infantry Divisions, the 741st, along with a company of the 644th Tank Destroyer Battalion, was instrumental in helping hold the northern shoulder of the Bulge in vicious fighting in and around Rocherath-Krinkelt during the German Ardennes Offensive (Battle of the Bulge) in December 1944. By now battle-seasoned veterans, tankers from the battalion resisted repeated numerous hard-pressed attacks by spearheading elements of the SS-heavy Sixth Panzer Army from 16 to 19 December. Facing superior German Panther (among others) supported by infantry, the battalion fought many small unit engagements, deftly stalking the German tanks in twos and threes until they could destroy or immobilize them with shots from the flanks or rear. On 19 December, elements of the battalion were the rear guard of an orderly withdrawal from Rocherath-Krinkelt to positions behind Wirtzfeld to the west and northwest.

The resistance put up by the 2nd Infantry Division, along with the attached tanks and tank destroyers, thwarted the northern penetration of the German offensive, delaying their advance by three days, and caused them to side step to a less suitable road network, allowing allied reinforcements to prepare positions further to the west with which to blunt the attack. For their role at Rocherath, Companies A, B, and C of the 741st Tank Battalion were awarded the Presidential Unit Citation. (Note: The citation is not listed in DA Pam 672-1, the official register of unit citations and campaign credits, and is therefore not listed among unit awards and decorations here. It is however cited in "Cole", the official U.S. Army history of the Battle of the Bulge, and is claimed in 741, the unofficial unit history published in Germany before the battalion returned to the United States. The citation narrative is quoted in full as follows: "Companies A, B, and C of the 741st Tank Battalion are cited for outstanding performance of duty against the enemy from 17–19 December 1944. During a violent enemy counterattack in the KRINKELT-ROCHERATH area, BELGIUM, personnel inexperienced in combat such as cooks, clerks and drivers, manned deadlined tanks and with superb courage met the headlong plunge of the enemy and inflicted severe casualties upon him, with utter disregard for their personal safety, the officers and men of these three gallant companies faced devastating hostile tank, anti-tank and self-propelled artillery fire and fought on tenaciously against overwhelming enemy forces. Again and again the infuriated enemy threw armor and infantry against the dauntless defenders but for three days and nights these assaults were turned back by the unwavering fortitude of the inspired men, when it became necessary to withdraw to a more tenable defensive position the tank men covered the withdrawal and were the last to leave the scene of the battle. During the bitter three-day engagement they had destroyed twenty seven enemy tanks, five armored vehicles and two trucks. Their indomitable fighting spirit and unflinching devotion to duty are in keeping with the highest traditions of the armed forces". – GO 157, HQ, Third Army, 1 July 1945. See 741: D-Day to V-E Day)

=== Advance into Germany ===
After the Battle of the Bulge, the battalion refitted and resupplied in the vicinity of Berg and Robertville, Belgium, still in support of the 2nd Infantry Division – A Company was attached to the 99th Infantry Division near Elsenborn, but it was soon returned to battalion control. Beginning on 15 January 1945, the battalion was gradually recommitted to combat operations in support of the 2nd Infantry Division as it once again began advancing eastward into Germany. In supporting the 2nd Infantry Division, the 741st Tank Battalion followed the division's path, entering Germany at Gemünd on 4 March 1945. It reached the Rhine at Bad Breisig on 10 March, and briefly guarded the bridge at Remagen from 12 to 20 March. The division took Göttingen on 8 April and Leipzig on 18 April. The battalion's tanks transported lead elements of the division some 200 miles from 1–3 May 1945 all the way to the Czech border, and had reached Plzeň, Czechoslovakia, by 6 May, two days before hostilities ended on 8 May.

=== Post war ===
The battalion was withdrawn to Germany and briefly took up occupation duties before returning to the United States. The unit arrived in New York on 25 October and was inactivated at Camp Kilmer, New Jersey, on 27 October 1945.

After several years as an inactive unit, on 1 February 1949, the battalion was redesignated as the 396th Heavy Tank Battalion and allotted to the U.S. Army Reserve. The battalion was activated at Spokane, Washington, on 5 March 1949 and assigned to the 96th Infantry Division. Despite the outbreak of the Korean War, the battalion was not called to active duty and, on 1 March 1952, was again redesignated as the 741st Tank Battalion and inactivated.

== Unit awards and decorations ==
- Presidential Unit Citation, 6–7 June 1944, War Department General Order 70–45.
- Belgian Fourragère: 13–19 December 1944 and 19–30 December 1944, Department of the Army General Order 43–50.
- Occupation Credit, 2 May – 4 June 1945, Germany.

== Bibliography ==
- Anderson, Jr., Richard C. Cracking Hitler's Atlantic Wall: The 1st Assault Brigade Royal Engineers on D-Day. Mechanicsburg, PA: Stackpole Books, 2009. ISBN 978-0-8117-0589-9
- Anonymous. 741: D-Day to V-E Day (unofficial unit history). Paris: Éditions Paul Dupont, 1945.
- Anonymous. The Story of Vitamin Baker: "We’ll Never Go Over-Seas". 1945.
- Blumenson, Martin. Breakout and Pursuit. Washington, DC: U.S. Army Center of Military History, 1993. http://www.history.army.mil/html/books/007/7-5-1/CMH_Pub_7-5-1_fixed.pdf
- Cole, Hugh M. The Ardennes: Battle of the Bulge. Washington, DC: U.S. Army Center of Military History, 1993. http://www.history.army.mil/html/books/007/7-8-1/CMH_Pub_7-8-1.pdf
- Combined Arms Research Library (CARL) Digital Collection. After Action Report 741st Tank Battalion, 21 May 1944 – April 1945. http://cgsc.cdmhost.com/cdm/singleitem/collection/p4013coll8/id/3512/rec/3
- Combined Arms Research Library (CARL) Digital Collection. Unit Journal – 741st Tank Bn. Fort Leavenworth, KS. http://cgsc.cdmhost.com/cdm/singleitem/collection/p4013coll8/id/3442/rec/15
- Harrison, Gordon A. Cross Channel Attack. Washington, DC: U.S. Army Center of Military History, 1993.
- Headquarters, Department of the Army. DA Pam 672-1 Unit Citation and Campaign Participation Credit Register. Washington, DC: U.S. Army, July 1961.
- Sawicki, James A. Tank Battalions of the U.S. Army. Dumfries, VA: Wyvern Press, 1983. ISBN 0-9602404-5-4
- U.S. Army Center of Military History, World War II Divisional Combat Chronicles – 2d Infantry Division. http://www.history.army.mil/html/forcestruc/cbtchron/cc/002id.htm
- Williams, Mary H. (ed.). Chronology 1941–1945. Washington, DC: U.S. Army Center of Military History: 1989
- Yeide, Harry. Steel Victory. New York, NY: Ballantine Books, 2003. ISBN 0-89141-782-6
- Zaloga, Steven J. US Tank and Tank Destroyer Battalions in the ETO 1944-1945. Botley, Oxford, UK: Osprey Publishing, 2005. ISBN 1841767980
