= Vehicle snorkel =

Raised air intake for internal combustion engine allowing wading capacity

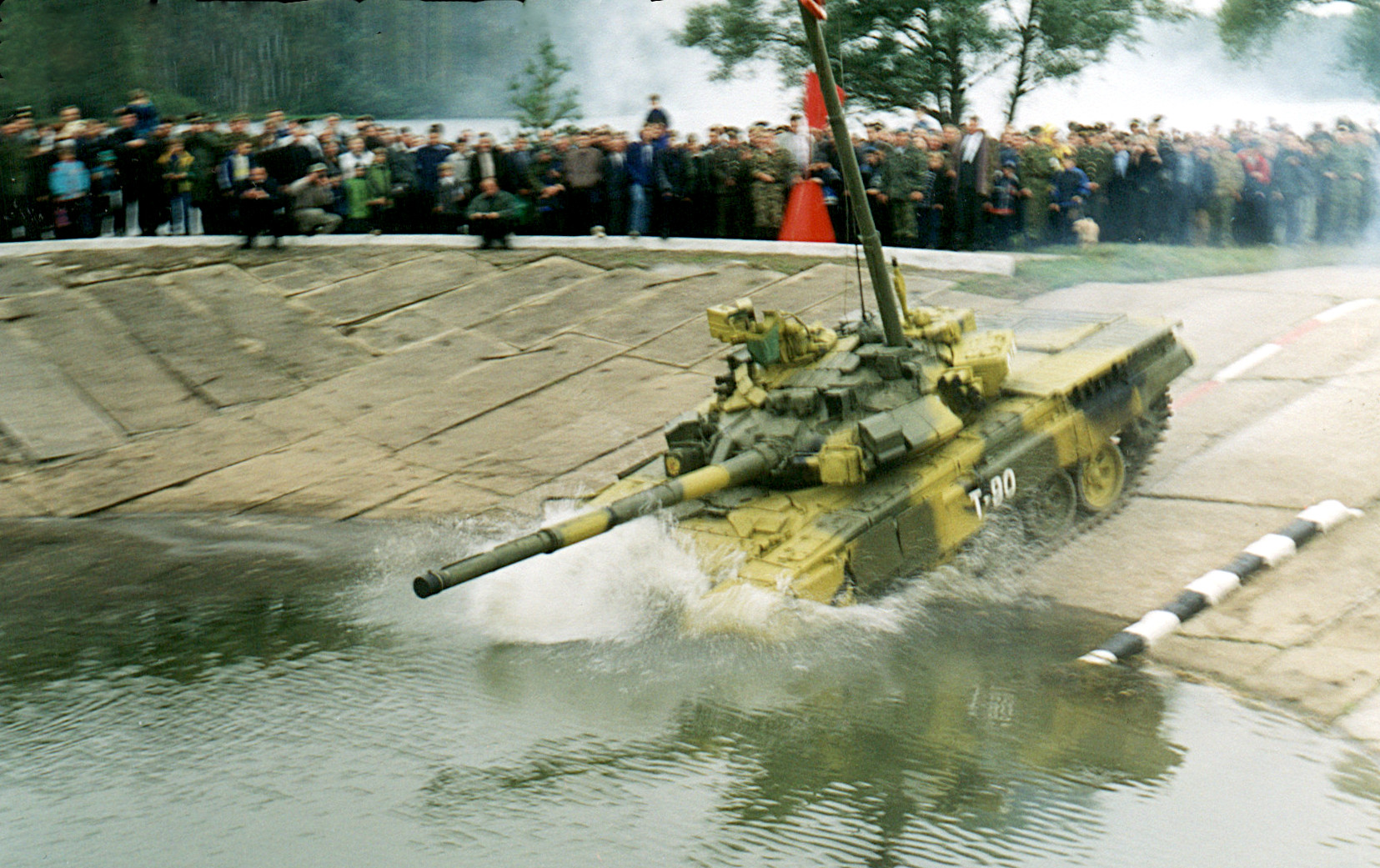
Russian T-90 tank with wading snorkel erected

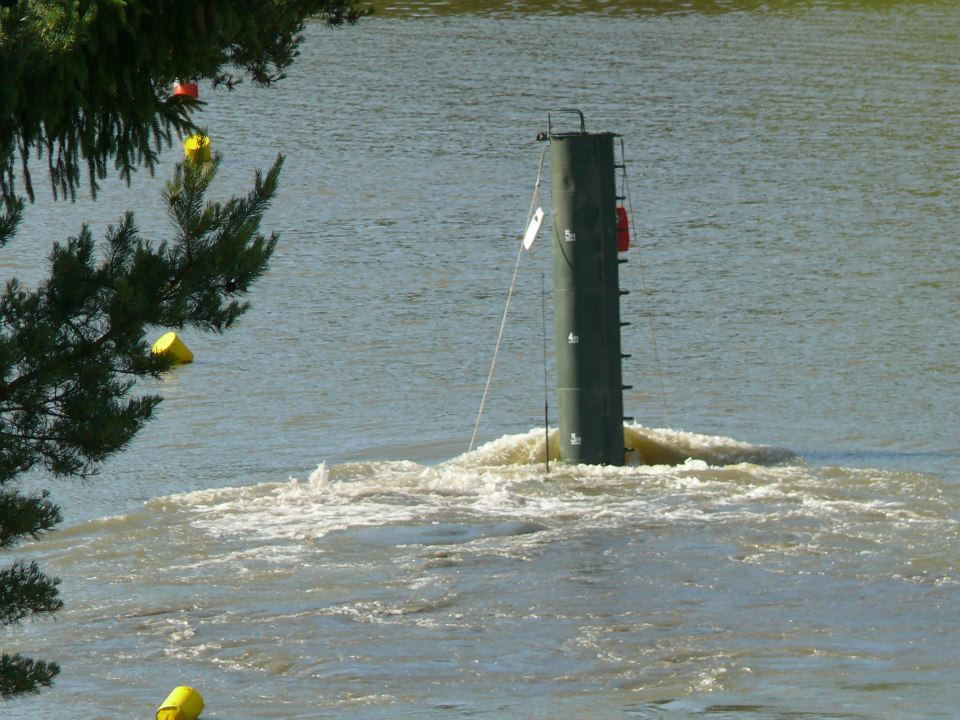
T-72M4CZ tank fully submerged

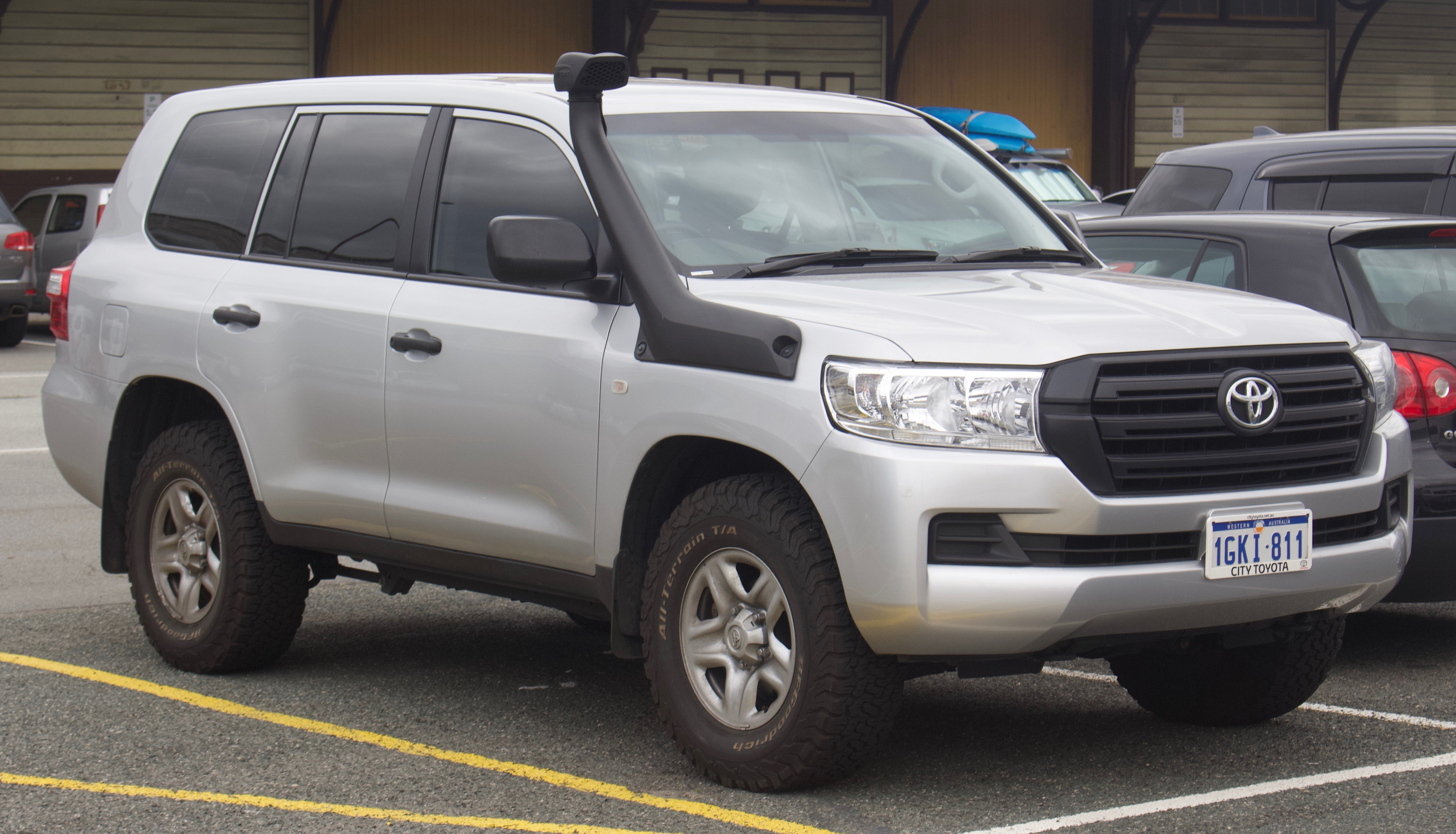
Civilian Toyota Land Cruiser 200 with snorkel

A vehicle snorkel is the land-based equivalent of the submarine snorkel which allows submarines to use diesel engines while submerged. Snorkels, when used by vehicles with air-breathing internal combustion engines, sometimes allow limited deep wading capability for river crossing or amphibious landing operations, particularly in the case of tanks and other armored vehicles. In such cases, the snorkel supplies air for both the engine and the sealed crew compartment, allowing total submersion. Often, the snorkel pipe is of large diameter and fits over the crew hatch, to provide an escape route for the crew in case the vehicle becomes stuck or disabled while underwater.

Military wheeled vehicles, such as a HEMTT transport or a Unimog, are often capable of mounting snorkels for the engine air intake only, to allow them to wade through relatively deep water, limited by the height of snorkel intake and the driver's head (usually slightly less than the height of the roof). Generally, the crew compartment is not watertight, and the crew will be immersed, unlike in tracked vehicles, which are generally totally sealed. The maximum depth is dictated by the height of the snorkel; if the water level should reach the snorkel intake, it will be drawn into the engine, immediately killing it. In the case of a World War II-era amphibious Jeep, all of the engine openings and electrical wiring are sealed, and the driver must first operate a damper that prevents water from entering the intake manifold. After fording, all vehicles wheel bearings must be repacked with new lubricants due to water contamination. Modern military vehicles typically come from the factory with waterproofed wiring systems.

For off-road driving enthusiasts (or those who merely enjoy the aesthetic benefits), similar snorkel equipment is available as an aftermarket accessory for many civilian four-wheel drive vehicles, or available as a "universal" kit, and making a home-built snorkel system is not difficult for most vehicles. The snorkel is typically routed out through one of the front fenders or directly through the hood, and up beside the "A-pillar" to the level of the roofline where it is terminated with either a mushroom intake or a forward-facing intake, although a simple aftermarket cone filter on the end of a flexible length of plastic tubing works just as well (it is also possible to simply run the tubing directly to the factory air-filter box). As long as all air intake parts inside the engine bay are sealed, it will work successfully. Although most external system wiring on modern vehicles is quite well sealed, it is usually wise to use additional sealing on computers, fuse boxes, etc., and interior electronics such as radios and entertainment systems (not to mention digital dashboards) are generally not waterproofed and will be ruined by water entering the vehicle. It is also important to install extended ventilation lines to the axles and transfer case; these typically are no more than a foot or so long, and will allow water to contaminate the lubricants. Even with extended vent lines, water can frequently leak past the oil seals; thus it is generally wise to check the axle and transfer case lubricants and change if necessary after deep water crossings.
