= DD tank =

British WWII amphibious swimming tank

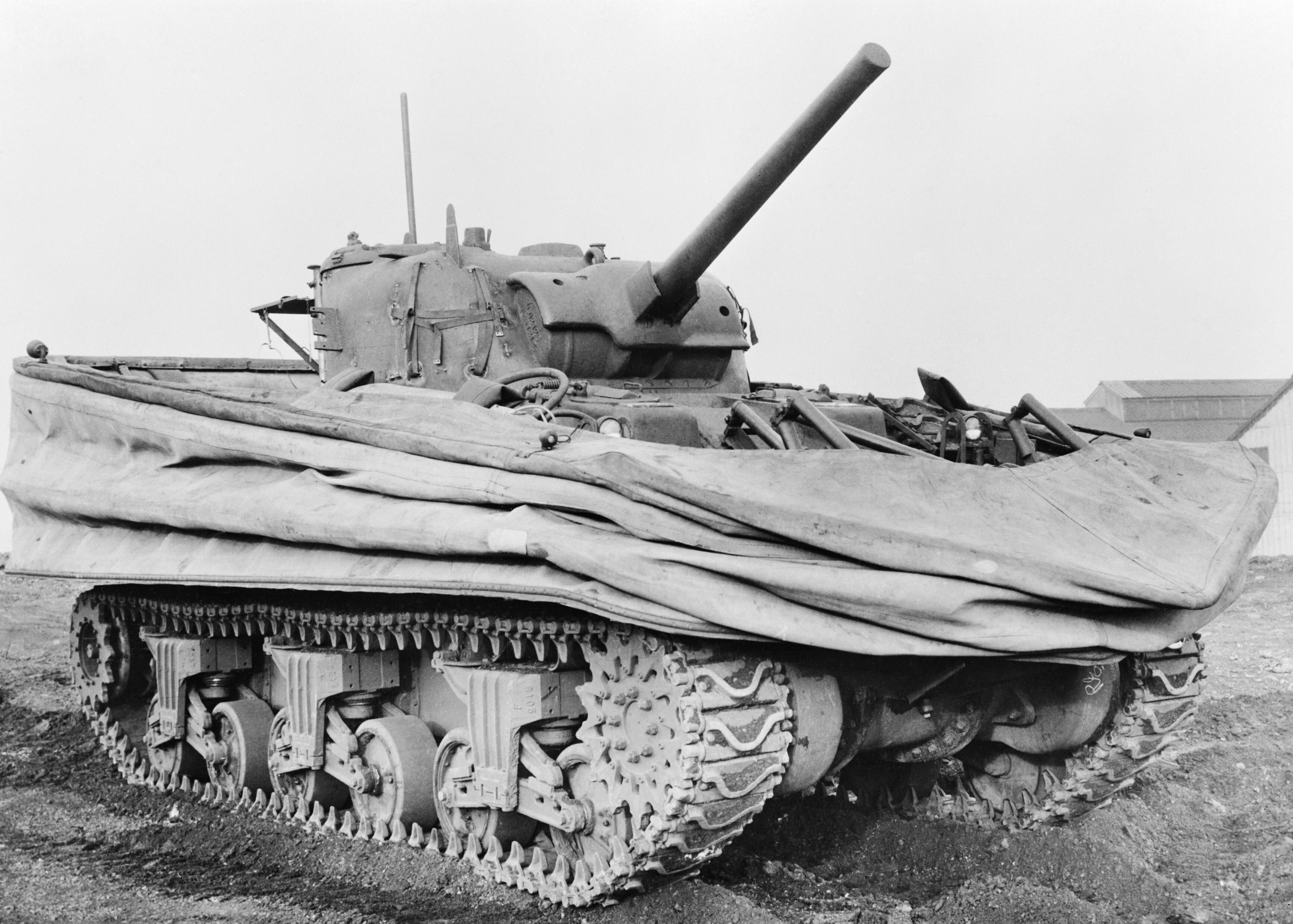
- DD Sherman tank with its flotation screen lowered.

Service history
- In service: 1944–1950s
- Used by: United Kingdom; Canada; United States
- Wars: World War II

Production history
- Designer: Nicholas Straussler
- Designed: 1941–1944
- Variants: DD Valentine, DD Sherman

Specifications
- Maximum speed: 4 knots (7 km/h) swimming

DD or duplex drive tanks, nicknamed "Donald Duck tanks", were a type of amphibious swimming tank developed by the British during the Second World War. The phrase is mostly used for the Duplex Drive variant of the M4 Sherman medium tank, that was used by the Western Allies during and after the Normandy Landings in June 1944.

DD tanks worked by erecting a canvas 'flotation screen' around the tank, which enabled it to float in water. 'Duplex drive' refers to the fitted propellers allowing propulsion through water, which supplemented the usual track propulsion used when the flotation screens were lowered upon landing to fight as an ordinary tank.

The DD tanks were one of the many specialized assault vehicles, collectively known as Hobart's Funnies, devised to support the planned invasion of Europe.

== History ==
=== Early development ===
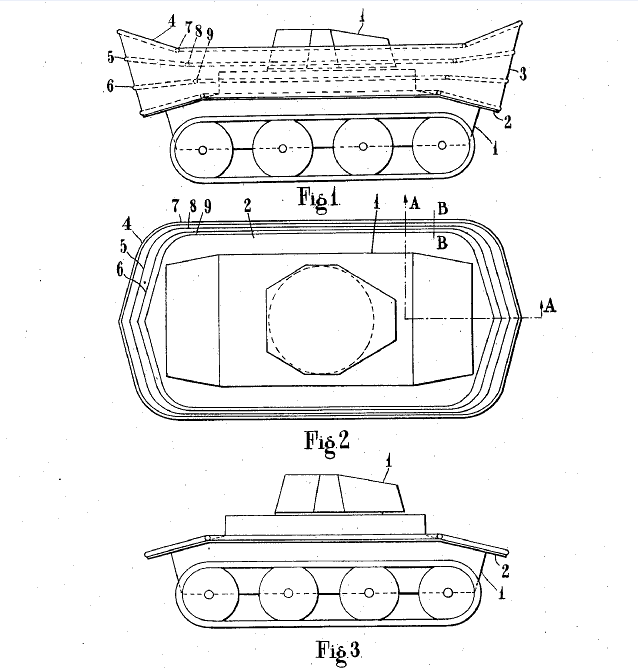
Diagram of a flotation screen fitted to a Tetrarch tank, taken from Straussler's patent, U.S. patent 2,390,747, issued 1945

Amphibious tanks were devised during the First World War; a floating version of the British Mark IX tank was being tested in November 1918, just as the war ended. Development continued during the interwar period.

As tanks are heavy for their size, providing them with enough buoyancy was a difficult engineering problem. Designs that could float unaided were generally small and light with thin armour, such as the Soviet T-37. Heavier vehicles, such as the experimental, British AT1* had to be so large that the design was impractical.

The alternative was to use flotation devices that the tank discarded as soon as it landed–the approach adopted by the Japanese with their Type 2 Ka-Mi and Type 3 Ka-Chi amphibious tanks. In Britain, the Hungarian-born engineer Nicholas Straussler developed collapsible floats for Vickers-Armstrong that could be mounted on either side of a light tank to make it amphibious. Trials conducted by the British War Office showed that such a tank, propelled by an outboard motor, 'swam' reasonably well.

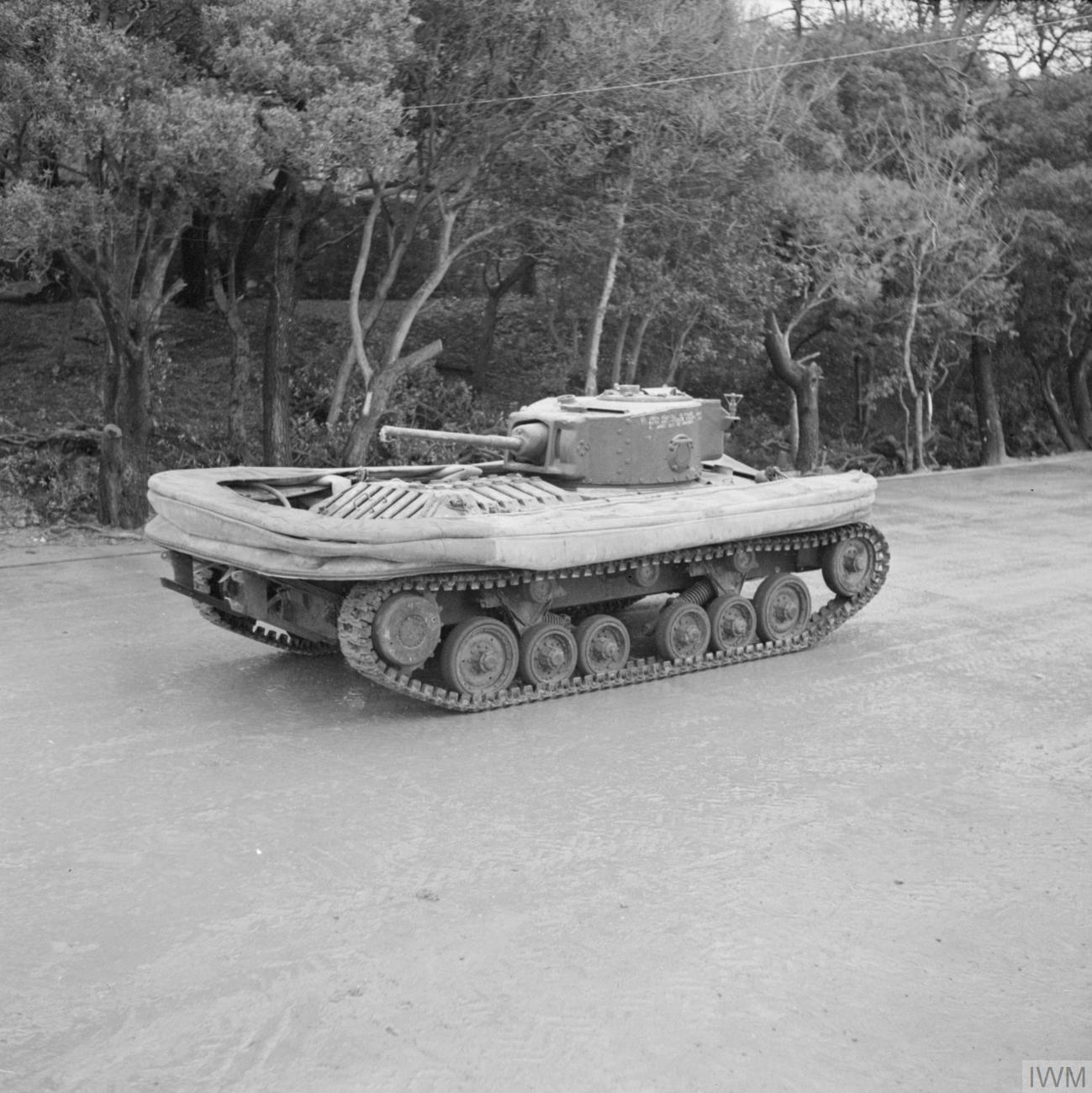
Valentine DD tank with screen lowered and gun pointing towards the rear of the vehicle

The system was unsatisfactory in other ways, due primarily to the unwieldy bulk of the floats that were big enough to float a tank – these were each roughly the size of the tank itself. In practice, there would be severe difficulties in transporting enough floats, even collapsed ones, to move a large unit of tanks across a body of water. Also, such floats made a tank too wide to launch from an off-shore landing craft, making their use in amphibious landings impractical.

In 1940, Straussler solved the problem by devising the flotation screen – a device which folded and was made of waterproofed canvas. The screen covered the top half of the tank effectively creating a canvas hull, greatly increasing the vehicle's freeboard, and providing buoyancy in the water. When collapsed, it would not interfere with the tank's mobility or combat effectiveness.

The first tank to be experimentally fitted with a flotation screen was a redundant Tetrarch light tank provided to Straussler. Its first trial took place in June 1941 in Brent Reservoir (also known as Welsh Harp Reservoir) in north London in front of General Sir Alan Brooke (at the time General Officer-in-Command Home Forces). The reservoir had been the location where trials of the floating version of the World War I, Mark IX tank took place, 23 years earlier. Satisfactory sea trials of the Tetrarch took place in Portsmouth Harbour.

A prototype of a Duplex Drive Valentine tank began trials on 21 May 1942, although it subsequently sank (during a trial in which it was subject to machine gun fire). In June 1942, permission was given by the Ministry of Supply for the manufacture of 450 Valentine DDs.

It later became clear that the Sherman was more suitable for use with a screen than the Valentine and the DD screen was adapted for the Sherman by April 1943. One reason for this was that the Sherman could move in the water with its gun forward ready to fire as soon as land was reached. The Valentine was also an older and generally inferior design.

247 Valentine DD and 693 Sherman DD were built by the United Kingdom in 1944.

=== Training ===
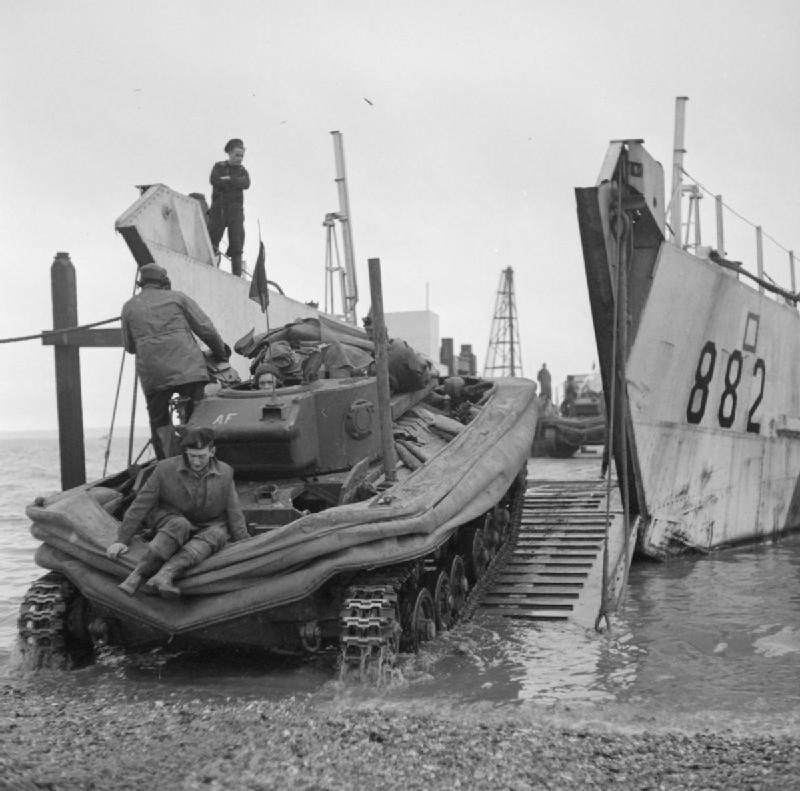
A Valentine DD tank being loaded onto a landing craft prior to a training exercise, Stokes Bay, Hampshire, January 1944

Valentine DDs were used for training and the majority of the US, British, and Canadian DD crews did their preliminary training with them. Crews learned elementary phases of the DD equipment at Fritton Lake, on the Norfolk/Suffolk border. Here they learnt to waterproof and maintain their tanks, use Amphibious Tank Escape Apparatus, launch from mock up LCT ramps and navigate around the two and a half mile lake. After two weeks of training at Fritton, the crews moved to Stokes Bay, Gosport, Hampshire for three weeks of intensive training from landing craft. The DDs would be loaded on the embarkation hards at Stokes Bay, and launch into the Solent. They would form up in echelon, cross 1,200 yards (1,100 m) of water and land at Osborne Bay on the Isle of Wight. The regiments would then move to Combined Training Centres, such as at the Moray Firth in Scotland and Barafundle Bay in Wales to train with other elements and units, during which period crews incurred several losses.

On 4 April 1944, Operation Smash was held at Studland Bay in Dorset with the Valentine DDs. The trial run of the tanks ran into difficulty when a change in the weather adversely affected the sea conditions. Six tanks sank with the loss of six crew members.

The sunken wrecks of at least 10 tanks, lost during training, are known to lie off the British coast. Another sunken DD tank remains at the bottom of Fritton Lake.

=== Sherman DD ===
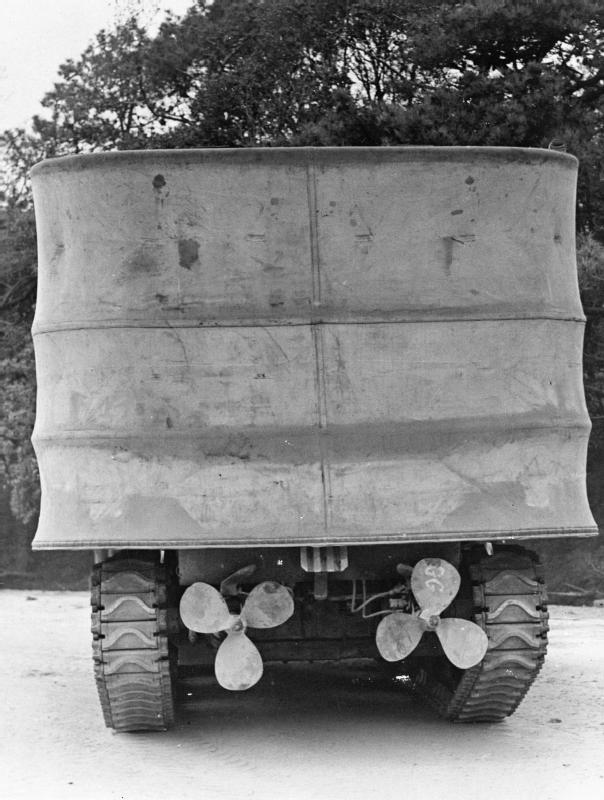
Rear view of a Sherman DD with its screen raised, showing the twin propellers in their lowered position

Modifications to the Sherman included the sealing of the lower hull, the addition of the propeller drive and the addition of Straussler's flotation screen around the hull, together with its inflation system. The base of the canvas flotation screen was attached to a horizontal mild steel boat-shaped platform welded to the tank's hull. The screen was supported by horizontal metal hoops and by 36 vertical rubber tubes. A system of compressed air bottles and pipes inflated the rubber tubes to give the curtain rigidity. The screen could be erected in 15 minutes and quickly collapsed once the tank reached the shore. In practice there was about 3 ft (0.91 m) of freeboard. In combat, the flotation system was considered expendable and it was assumed the tank crew would remove and discard it as soon as conditions allowed. In practice, some units kept the flotation equipment and their tanks were used in several amphibious operations.

A pair of propellers at the rear provided propulsion. One problem presented by the Sherman was that the configuration of the transmission (gearbox at the front) made it impossible to take a drive-shaft directly from the gearbox to the propellers. The solution to this was to have sprocket wheels at the rear of the tank so power was delivered to the propellers by the tank's tracks. DD Tanks could swim at up to 4 knots (4.6 mph; 7.4 km/h). Both the commander and the driver could steer in the water, although with different methods. A hydraulic system under the control of the driver could swivel the propellers; the commander from a platform at the rear of the turret, where he could see over the skirt, could contribute by operating a large tiller.

The first DD Shermans produced by the British were used by both British and US units. Later production was by both the US and the UK. British Shermans were Sherman III (M4A2) and Sherman V (M4A4) conversions. The US used the M4A1 only for their conversions.

Experience from D-Day led to an improved, Mark II version of the DD Sherman. The screen was extended and strengthened by fixing to the turret, a new type of bilge pump fitted and a second set of hydraulic steering controls was fitted at the commander's station, although his tiller was retained. An air compressor replaced the air cylinders that provided the pressurized air to erect the screen. After D-Day, US Army interest decreased, looking for other options.

While the US Army in Europe used the Sherman DD design, in the Pacific LVTs were equipped with armor and guns to support landings up to the sea line; from the sea line, tanks were supposed to support infantry.

=== Later flotation screen use ===
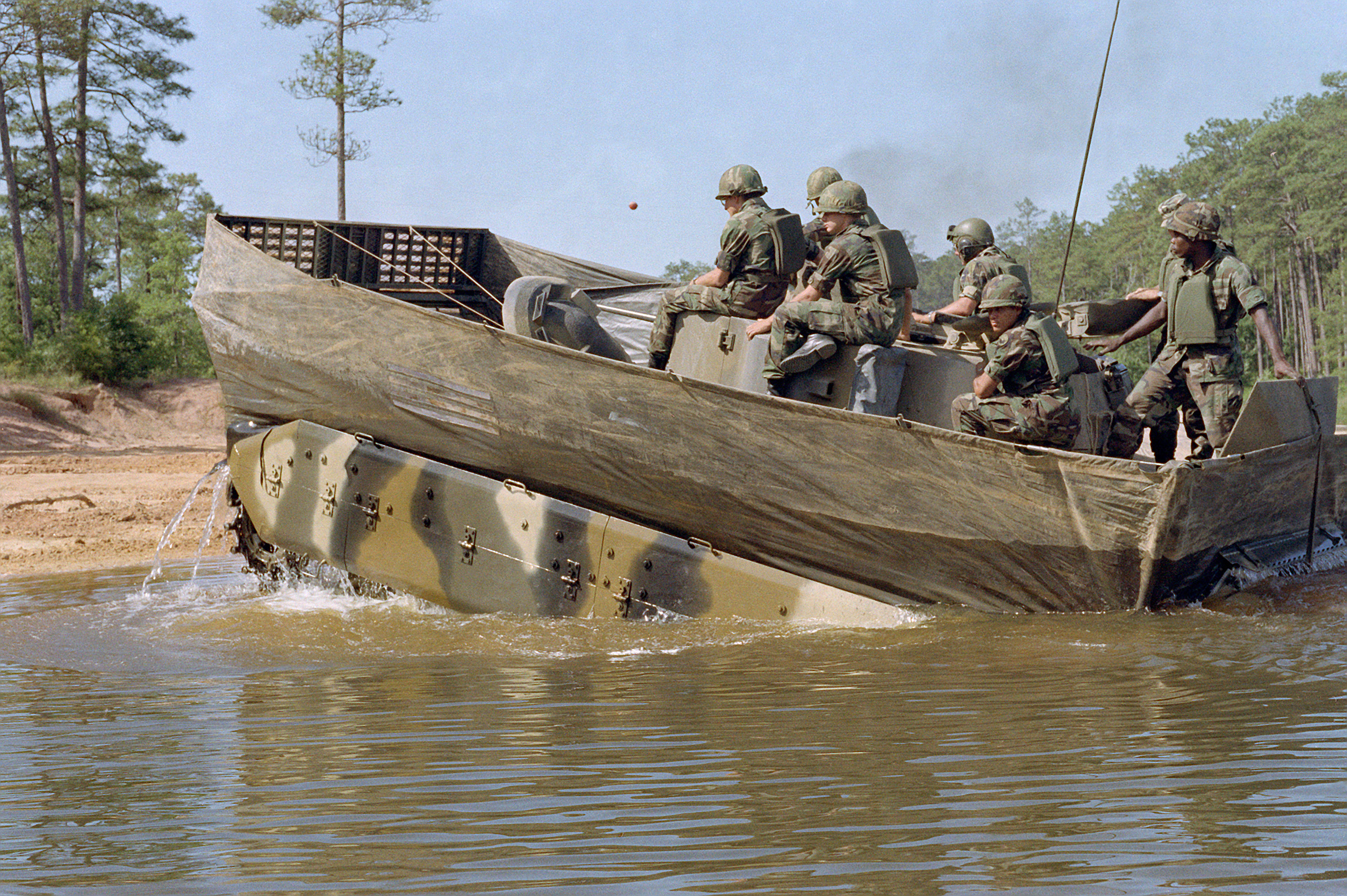
M2 Bradley Infantry Fighting Vehicle emerging from the water at Fort Benning (1983). This M2 uses a screen but is not DD

Designs were made to give the Cromwell and Churchill the DD treatment, but these were never completed. A floating, flame-thrower equipped version of the Universal Carrier was tested, as was a flamethrower-equipped DD Sherman. This towed an armoured fuel trailer, like those used by the Churchill Crocodile. The trailer, in the water, was supported by an inflatable flotation device.

After the war, the Centurion was tested with a flotation screen and duplex drive. By the end of the 1950s, development of DD tanks had ceased, partly because main battle tanks were becoming too heavy to be practically made to swim – although experiments were carried-out in the mid-1960s with a floating Centurion that used a similar system, but with rigid panels instead of a flexible screen. The 38 tonne Vickers MBT was fitted with a flotation screen that allowed it to swim.

Medium and light vehicles continued to be made amphibious by the use of flotation screens into the 1980s, but without the DD. Instead, they used the movement of their standard running gear (e.g. tracks) for water propulsion also. These included the Swedish Stridsvagn 103 (S-Tank), the American M551 Sheridan light tank, the British FV432 Armoured personnel carrier, the Mark IV version of the Ferret armoured car and early versions of the American M2 Bradley Infantry Fighting Vehicle. Of these, only the FV432 and the Bradley remain in service and current versions lack flotation screens.

== Combat ==
The main use of DD tanks occurred on D-Day. They were also used in Operation Dragoon, the Allied invasion of southern France on 15 August 1944; Operation Plunder, the British crossing of the Rhine on 23 March 1945, and in several operations on the Italian Front in 1945. DD Tanks were sent to India; the 25th Dragoons were trained in their use, but planned operations against the Japanese in Malaya never occurred.

=== D-Day ===
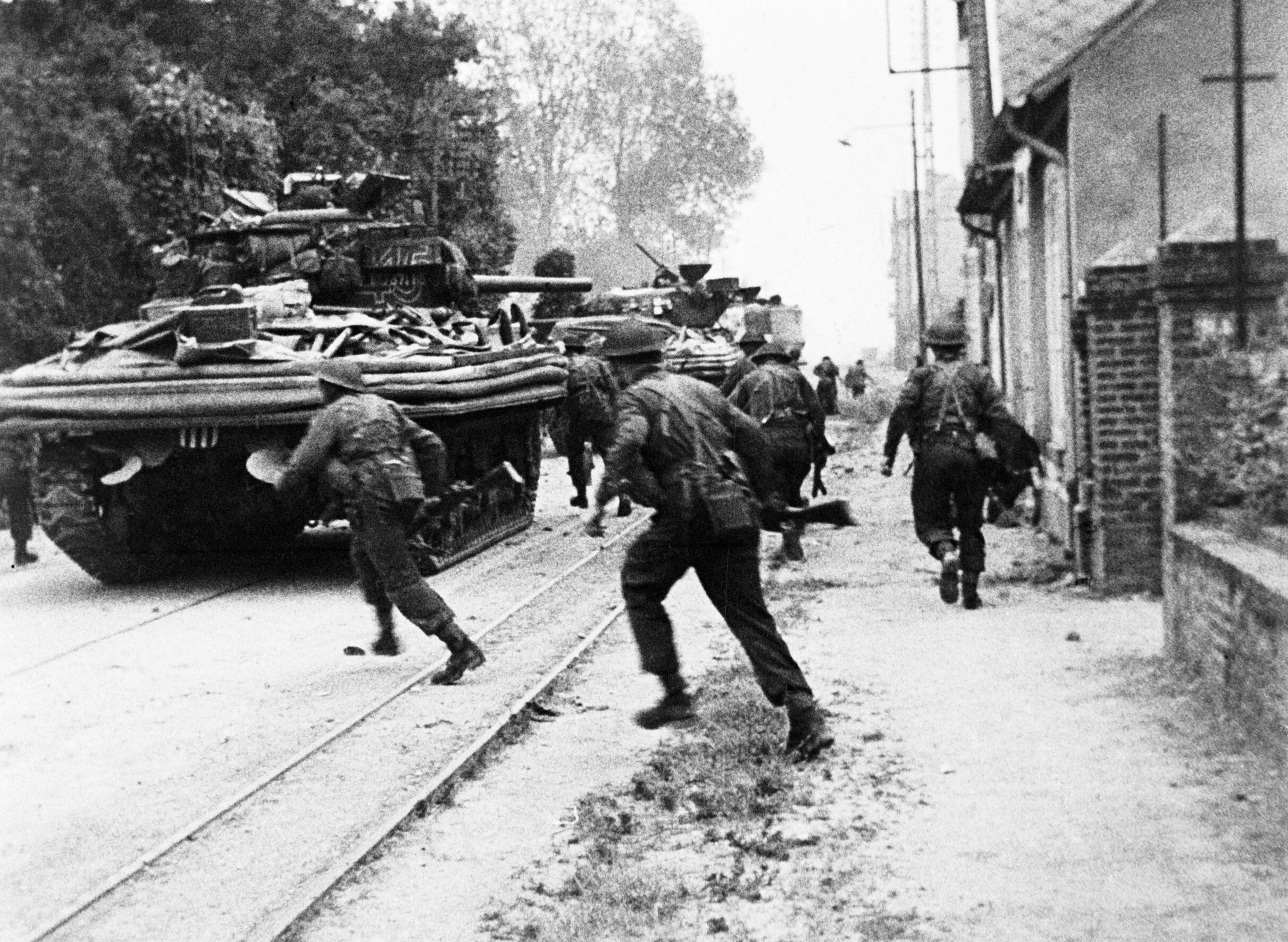
Men of No. 4 Commando engaged in house to house fighting with the Germans at Riva Bella, near Ouistreham. Sherman DD tanks of 'B' Squadron, 13/18th Royal Hussars are providing fire support and cover, 6 June 1944

The DD Sherman was used to equip eight tank battalions of American, British, and Canadian forces for the D-Day landings. They were carried in Tank Landing Craft, also known as Landing Craft, Tank (LCT). These could normally carry nine Shermans, but could fit fewer of the bulkier DDs. British and Canadian LCTs carried five tanks, the Americans carried four as their LCTs were shorter at about 120 feet (37 m).

The DDs would typically be launched around 3 kilometres (2 mi) from the shore, swim to the beaches and overpower the German defences. The tank's record was a mixture of success and failure, although they are mainly remembered for their disastrous performance on Omaha Beach.

==== Sword Beach ====
On the British Sword Beach, at the eastern end of the invasion area, the DD tanks worked well, as the sea was reasonably calm. The DD tanks from 'A' and 'B' Squadrons of 13th/18th Royal Hussars were launched 4 kilometres (2.5 mi) from shore. Five could not be launched as the leading tank on its LCT tore its screen – they were later landed directly on shore – one tank sank after being struck by an LCT.

==== Gold Beach ====
On Gold Beach, the sea was rougher. The tanks of the Nottinghamshire Yeomanry (Sherwood Rangers) were launched late, about 700 yd (640 m) from the shore. Eight tanks were lost on the way in and by the time the remainder landed, Sherman Crab (mine flail) tanks had already destroyed the German artillery and machine-gun positions that would have been their objective. Sea conditions meant the tanks of 'B' and 'C' Squadrons, from the 4th/7th Royal Dragoon Guards, were landed in the shallows. They then drove onto the beach with their screens up so they would not get swamped in the breakers. German anti-tank guns caused heavy losses in some sectors of the beach but the assault was successful.

==== Juno Beach ====
On the Canadian Juno Beach, The Fort Garry Horse and the 1st Hussars were equipped with DDs, but only those of the 1st Hussars could be launched. They were assigned to the 7th Canadian Brigade, at the western end of the beach. Some of the tanks were launched at 4,000 yd (3,658 m) and some at 800 yards (700 m); twenty-one out of twenty-nine tanks reached the beach. The 8th Canadian Brigade, at the eastern end of the beach, was forced to land without DD tanks because of rougher seas. They suffered heavy initial casualties, but were still able to make good progress.

==== Utah Beach ====
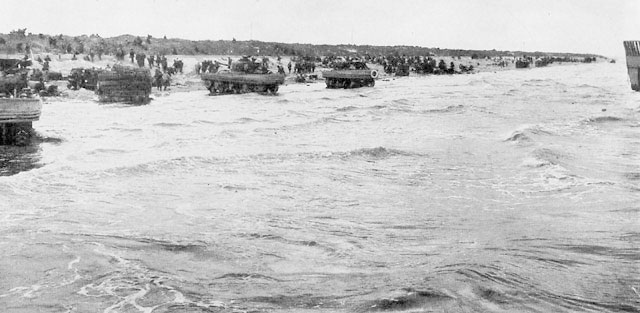
DD tanks on Utah beach

On Utah Beach, the DDs were operated by the 70th Tank Battalion. Armoured support was reduced by four DDs when their LCT was lost to German artillery fire. The remaining tanks were launched 15 minutes late 1,000 yards (914 m) from the beach. Twenty-seven out of twenty eight reached the beach but confusion caused by the massive smoke screen meant they landed around 2,000 yards (1,829 m) from their aiming point and saw some German opposition. At around 7:45 a.m. the 3rd battalion who was attached to the 8th infantry landed at Red Beach. Soon after, the 3rd battalion moved to Exit 2, which was now designated as the route vehicles would take to move inland. Some of the 70th tank battalion with its DD Shermans tagged along with the 3rd battalion. Part way along the causeway, some congestion formed due to an 88mm anti-tank gun and a ditch blown in the road. Two Shermans were knocked out (one of them was knocked out by a mine in the road) in the skirmish, but the gun that blocked the road was cleared by a direct hit from another Sherman.

==== Omaha Beach ====
At Omaha Beach almost all of the tanks launched offshore were lost, their absence contributing to the high casualty rate and sluggish advance from that beach.

The first wave at Omaha included 112 tanks: 56 from each of the 741st and 743rd Tank Battalions. Each of these battalions had 32 DD and 24 other Shermans (including many Sherman bulldozers for clearing obstacles). Starting at about 0540, the 741st Tank Battalion put 29 DDs into the sea; 27 of these sank, with only two surviving the long swim to the beach. Some of the crews of the sinking tanks managed to radio back and warn following units not to launch so far out. The remaining vehicles of the 741st Tank Battalion, and all tanks of the 743rd Tank Battalion (except for the four aboard one LCT that was hit by artillery fire just off the beach), were landed directly on the beach, starting at about 0640.

DD Tanks were designed to operate in waves up to 1 foot (0.3 m) high; however, on D-Day, the waves were up to 6 ft (1.8 m) high. These were much worse conditions than the tanks had been tested in and hence they were swamped. Also, the tanks of 741st Tank Battalion were launched too far out: about 3 mi (4.8 km) offshore. These factors also exacerbated the inherent difficulty of steering a 35-ton "vessel" with a low freeboard. The crews were equipped with DSEA emergency breathing apparatus capable of lasting 5 minutes, the tanks were also equipped with inflatable rafts. Some sources claim that these life-saving measures were ineffective; this was contradicted by the testimony of survivors. Most of the crews were rescued, mainly by the landing craft carrying the 16th Regimental Combat Team, although five crewmen are known to have died during the sinkings.

Until very recently it was believed that most of the DD Shermans of the 741st Tank Battalion were sunk almost immediately. Research undertaken in 2000 by the Institute of Nautical Archaeology at Texas A&M University, in cooperation with Robert's Naval Historical Center's Underwater Archaeology Branch, found evidence that some had come close to safely landing:

[T]he landing craft carrying them were drifting away from the target beach – forcing the tanks to set a course which put them side-on to high waves, thus increasing the amount of water splashing over and crumpling their canvas skirts. Two tanks – skippered by men with enough peacetime sailing experience to know not to turn their sides to the waves – actually made it to the beach. It had been widely believed the other tanks sunk almost immediately on leaving the landing craft, but our work showed some had struggled to within 1,000 metres of dry land.

Some stayed afloat for a matter of minutes; according to the crews one tank swam for 15 minutes, another: "We weren’t in the ocean [sic] 10 minutes when we had a problem". Tanks at the other four beaches suffered no such problems.

=== Operation Dragoon ===
The Operation Dragoon landings took place on 15 August 1944 between Toulon and Cannes in southern France.

A total of 36 DD tanks were used by three American tank battalions – the 191st, the 753rd, and the 756th. The 756th had eight tanks that were launched 2,500 yards (2,286 m) from the beaches; one was swamped by the bow-wave of a landing craft and one sank after striking an underwater obstacle. The twelve tanks of the 191st battalion were all landed on or close to the beach. Five of the C Company tanks of the 191st were immobilized by mines. The 753rd battalion had 16 tanks, of which eight were launched at sea and successfully reached the shore, eight were landed directly on the beach later in the day.

=== Northwest Europe ===
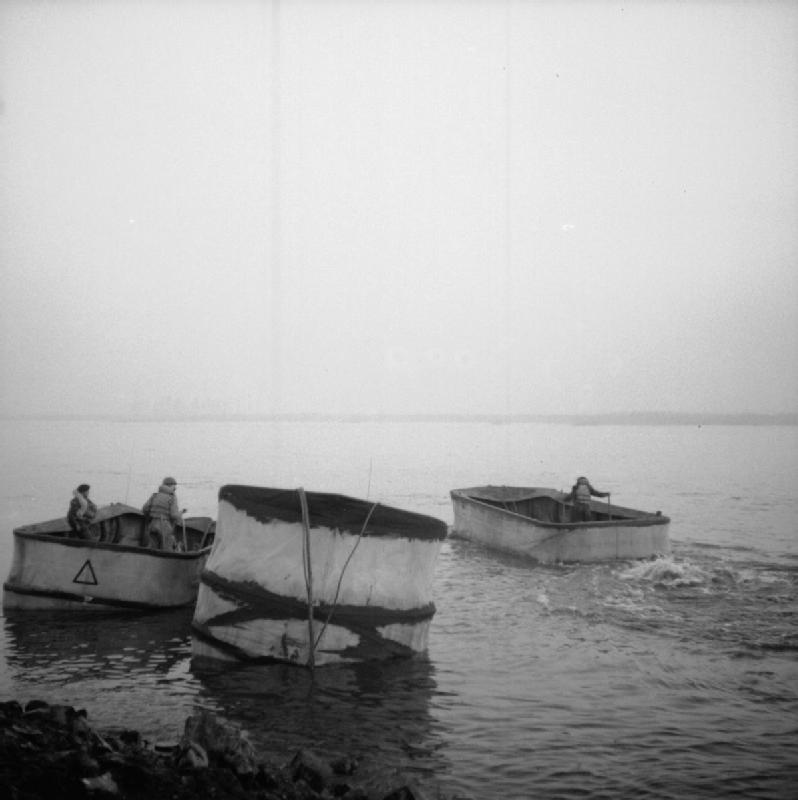
Sherman DD tanks crossing the Rhine, 24 March 1945

The Staffordshire Yeomanry were converted to DD tanks after D-Day and trained initially at Burton-upon-Stather, near Scunthorpe, before moving with them to Belgium. From early September, they were based at Elewyt at Lac d'Hofstade. On 26 October 1944, they undertook a 7-mile (11 km) swim across the Western Scheldt to attack South Beveland, during the Battle of the Scheldt. The DD Tanks' longest operational water crossing took place without casualties, but they had great difficulty in landing – 14 became bogged down in mud and only four were available for action.

Operation Plunder, the Rhine crossing, began on the night of 23 March 1945. As well as the Staffordshire Yeomanry, DD tanks equipped the American 736th and 738th Tank Battalions and the British 44th Royal Tank Regiment. Some tanks were lost in the river, but the crossings were considered a success. The tanks were launched from points upstream from their objectives, to take account of the Rhine's strong current. Mats laid at the objective points (carried across beforehand by Buffalos) allowed the DDs to climb the steep, muddy banks of the river.

The DD's last combat swimming operation was the Staffordshire Yeomanry's crossing of the River Elbe at Artlenburg on 29 April 1945.

=== Italian campaign ===
By February 1945, the 7th Queen's Own Hussars in Italy had been trained and equipped with DD tanks, both Shermans and Valentines. DD Shermans were successfully used in the crossing of the Po River on 24 April. On 28 April, those tanks still able to swim were used in an assault across the River Adige. During this operation, Valentine DDs were used to transport fuel (their only known use on active service). The tanks continued to be used in combat in the advance towards Venice. There were no further swimming operations, but it was found that the folded flotation screen offered a large seating area, making the tanks useful troop transports.

== "T-6 Device" ==
An alternative to the DD was the "T-6 Device", developed by the US Army. Limited numbers of the "T-6 Device" were used by the US Army and Marines during the landings on Okinawa. The "T-6 Device" kit consisted of a structure of box-like, pressed-steel floats (pontoons) mounted on the front, rear and sides of a Sherman. No propellers were fitted – propulsion was provided by the rotation of the tracks. The front and rear floats were discarded on the beach, some in the water. Explosive bolts were used. Side floats were removed from the tanks on shore when the tactical situation permitted. In an oral interview with former Pvt. Maurice Dean Derby 37699146, Browning Automatic Rifleman, Co. A, 17th Infantry Regiment, 7th Infantry Division, he related that "On the night of the landing (Okinawa, 1 April 1945) we were kept awake all night because the Tank Crews were beating on the pontoons with sledgehammers to remove them from the Tanks." The tanks were Co. B, 711 Tank Battalion.

Compared with the DD, the floats were bulky and harder to stow, limiting the number of tanks that could be carried in a landing craft. However, the system was more seaworthy and had the advantage of allowing the Sherman to fire its main gun as it approached the beach. The Sherman's gyroscopic gun stabilization allowed accurate fire even when the tank was being pitched by waves.

== German equivalent ==
During planning for an invasion of England in 1940 (Operation Sea Lion), the Germans also worked on developing amphibious tanks capable of directly supporting infantry during a beach assault.

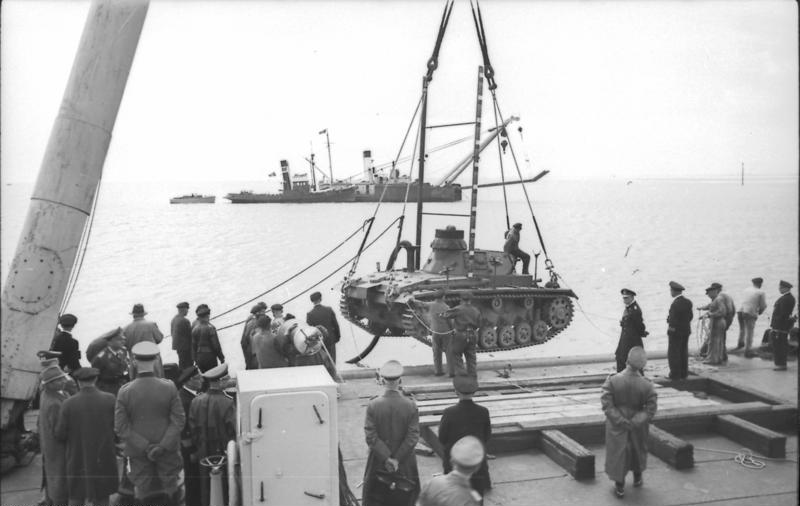
German Tauchpanzer III under test (1940); the crane ship Viper, which was to support Tauchpanzer operations, is in the background

The Schwimmpanzer II was a modified version of the Panzer II which, at 8.9 tons, was light enough to float with the attachment of long rectangular boxes to either side of the tank's hull. The boxes were made of aluminum and filled with Kapok sacks to preserve buoyancy if water leaked into the pontoons. Motive power came from the tank's own tracks which were connected by rods to a propeller shaft running through each float. The Schwimmpanzer II could make 5.7 km/h in the water. An inflatable rubber hose around the turret ring created a waterproof seal between the hull and turret. The tank's 2 cm gun and coaxial machinegun were kept operational and could be fired while the tank was still churning its way ashore. Schwimmpanzer IIs were deployed from a specially modified landing barge (Type C) and could be launched directly into open water from a hatch cut into the stern. The Germans converted 52 of these tanks to amphibious use prior to Sea Lion's cancelation.

Instead of floating, the Tauchpanzer, a modification of the Panzer III and Panzer IV, drove on the sea-bed. A rubber hose supplied the engine and crew with air and gave the waterproofed tank a maximum diving depth of 15 metres (49 ft) making it an extreme example of a wading tank. The Germans converted 168 Panzer IIIs and 42 Panzer IVs for use in Operation Sea Lion.

== Surviving DD tanks ==
=== Valentine ===
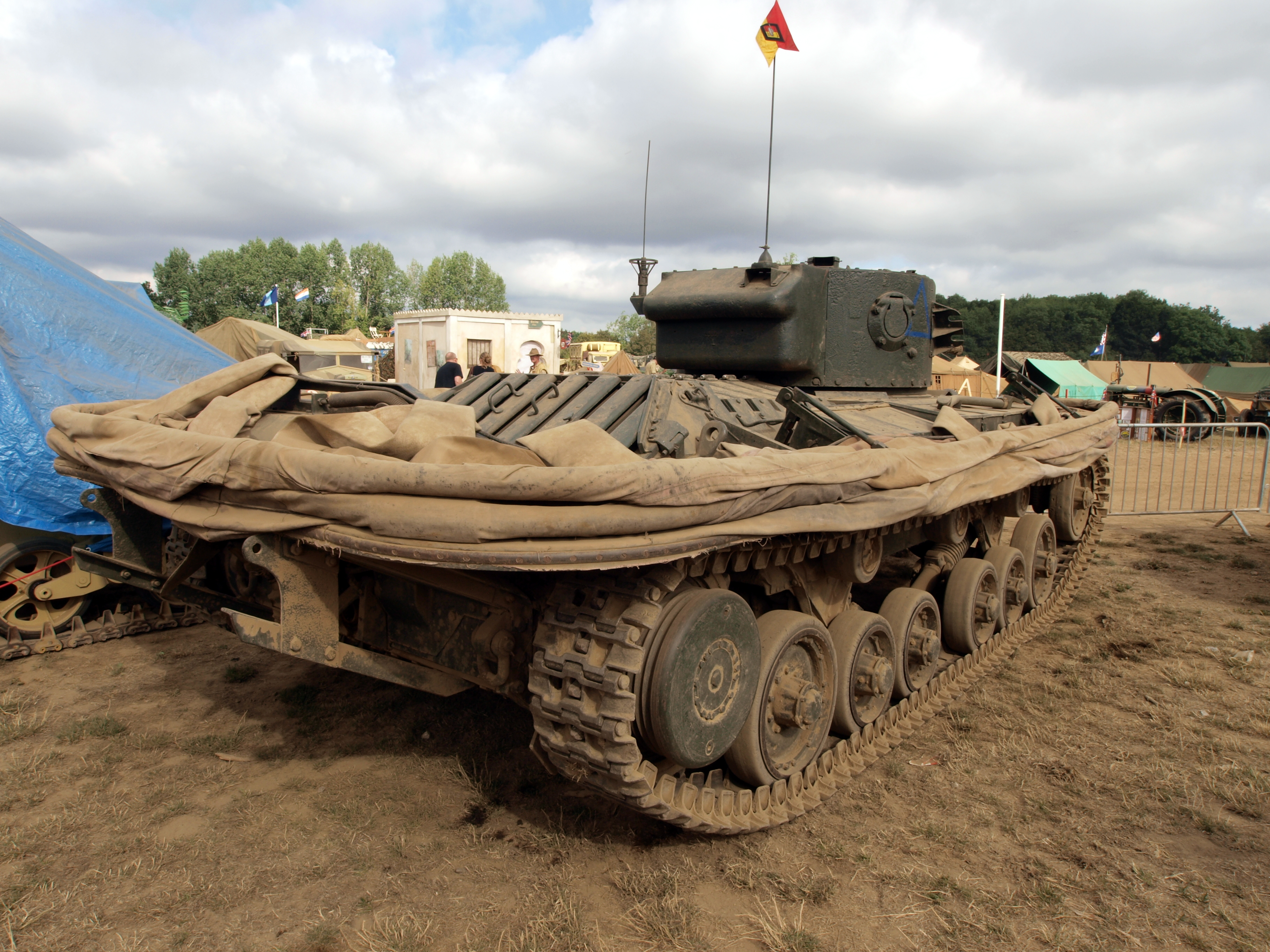
Privately owned, Valentine DD at a military show (2010)

A DD Valentine, restored to running condition, is in private ownership in England.

The sunken wrecks of others are known to exist, with at least seven having been identified in Studland Bay in Dorset, and six other wrecks to be in the Moray Firth in Scotland. Two sunken Valentine DDs rest 3.5 miles (5.6 km) out of Swanage Bay, Dorset. These tanks are 100 metres (330 ft) apart in 15 metres (49 ft) of water.

=== Sherman ===
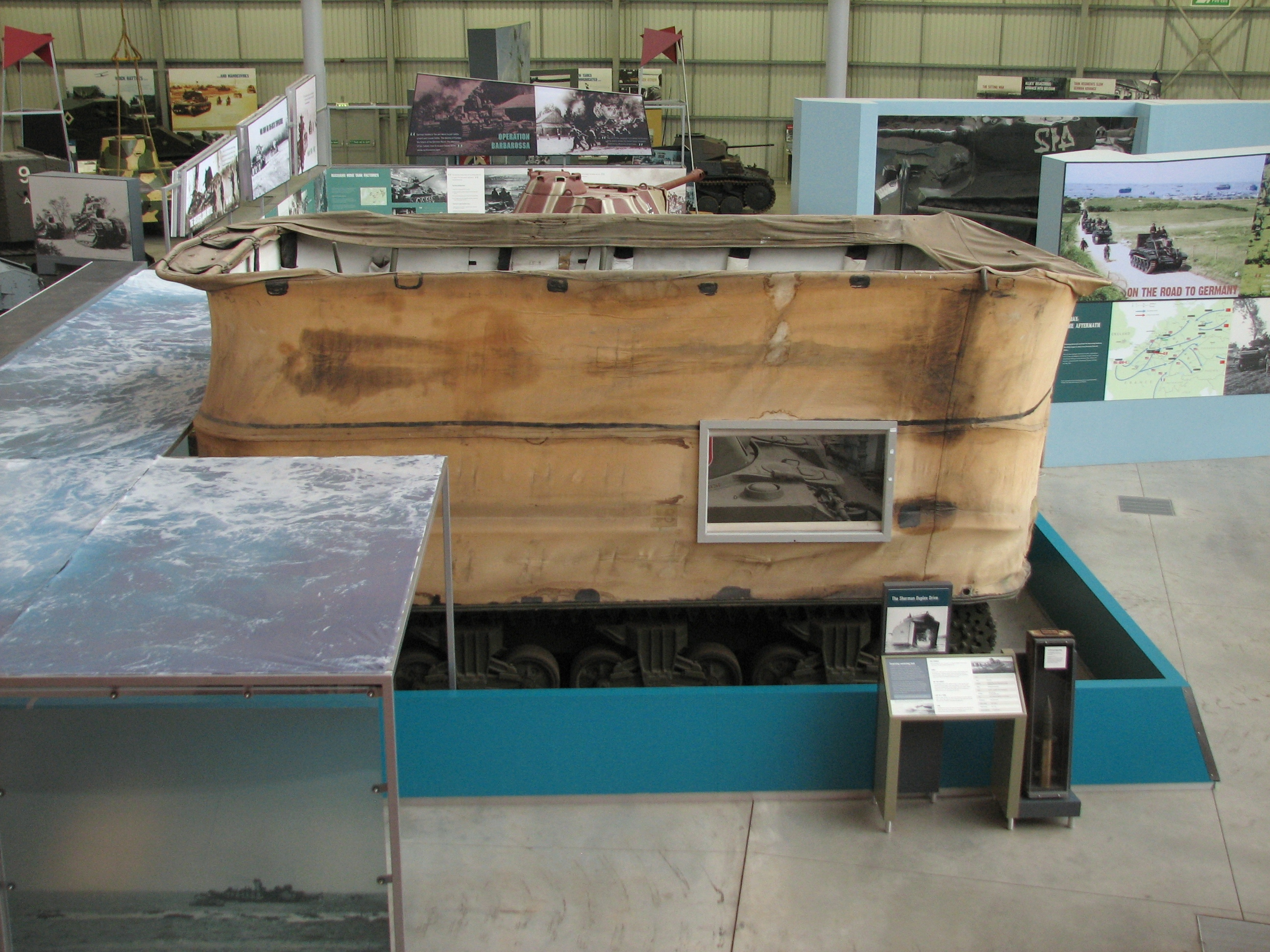
Surviving M4A2 Sherman DD in The Tank Museum, Bovington, including canvas flotation screen

- The Tank Museum, Bovington in England has an M4A2 DD Sherman in working order, with its canvas flotation screens still intact.
- Three of the DD Shermans lost on D-Day were salvaged in the 1970s. Two M4A1s are displayed at the Musée des Épaves Sous-Marine du Débarquement (Museum of Underwater Wrecks of the Invasion), a privately owned museum near Port-en-Bessin, in Normandy.

One of these tanks, along with a variety of personal items recovered with it, has been purchased by an American company, Overlord Research, LLC, based in West Virginia. The owners intend to return the tank to the United States, preferably for public display in an American Museum, such as the D-Day Museum in New Orleans, Louisiana or the National Museum of the United States Army, to be constructed at Fort Belvoir, Virginia. Details of the repatriation of the DD Tank and its final location in the United States are still being determined. As the tank was submerged for many years, Overlord believes preservation in its current condition, which shows its loss at sea as it approached Omaha Beach, is an aspect that is more historically important than attempting a restoration.

- A Canadian M4A4 recovered in 1971 is displayed as a monument at Courseulles-sur-Mer. In an effort led by Canadian ex-pat Léo Gariépy, who had commanded a 1st Hussars DD tank that landed near there in the first wave, the town took the initiative to retrieve from the water a DD tank ("Bold") which had sunk in front of Courseulles on D-Day. The tank was retrieved, restored, and installed in the Place Léo Gariépy.
- In 2000, there was an unsuccessful attempt by the United States Navy to raise a sunken M4A1 DD Sherman, located near Salerno in Italy. It was eventually recovered on 18 May 2002. It has been restored and is on display in the Piana delle Orme museum, in Italy, near Latina, south of Rome.
- A Sherman tank that was lost off the Devon coast in the UK, was recovered in the 1980s, largely due to the efforts of a beachcomber named Ken Small. It is now on display in the village of Torcross as part of a memorial to those who died on 8 April 1944 when an invasion rehearsal, Exercise Tiger, was attacked by E-boats. This Sherman is an M4A1 DD tank, this can be seen because of the specific gears to which the propellers were connected, under the rear deck. While the metal frame on which the flotation screen was fixed disappeared due to rust, some traces of it can still be seen around the hull.
- An M4A2E8 HVSS Duplex Drive tank was displayed in the "Mile of Tanks" at Aberdeen Proving Ground in the US for years; (possibly) the same tank unit was later displayed at the Museum Support Center in Anniston, AL, around 2013; and will soon join the Armor collection at Fort Benning. A converted M4A2E8 was displayed at the World War II US Military Vehicle Museum in San Rafael, California, in 2016.
- An M4A1 DD is part of the collection of the French tank museum, the Musée des Blindés. It carries a 76mm turret and main gun, which are not original to the tank when it was used during World War II.
- An M4A2 DD tank is displayed in India, at the Cavalry Tank Museum, Ahmednagar, India.

== See also ==
- Deep wading (driving a tank on the seabed using a snorkel)
- T-37A tank – World War II Soviet amphibious tank.
- T-38 – World War II Soviet amphibious tank.
- Type 2 Ka-Mi – World War II Japanese amphibious tank.
- Type 3 Ka-Chi – World War II Japanese amphibious tank.
- Allied Technological Cooperation During WW2
