= Deep wading =

Technique used by some heavy amphibious vehicles

Deep wading or deep fording is a technique used by some heavy semi-amphibious vehicles to traverse water that is several metres deep - the vehicle drives on the riverbed/lakebed/seabed and uses screens or a pipe (a snorkel) that reaches above the water surface for an air supply. The technique has been used by armoured military vehicles such as tanks and armored personnel carriers. Deep fording generally implies driving through water of such a depth that the vehicle is mostly or entirely submerged by the water, sometimes to several times the height of the vehicle itself, as well as a sealed crew compartment, complete with air supply for the crew. This makes it different from the less extreme "wading" done by many off-road vehicles which are simply fitted with a snorkel that is higher than the normal engine air intake, roughly level with the top of the cab. In these cases, the crew compartment is not watertight, and the snorkel provides air only for the engine. Thus maximum height is limited by the crew's need to breathe, and very rarely completely submerges the vehicle.

In contrast, lighter, true-amphibious vehicles that float on the water surface are not limited by the depth of the water.

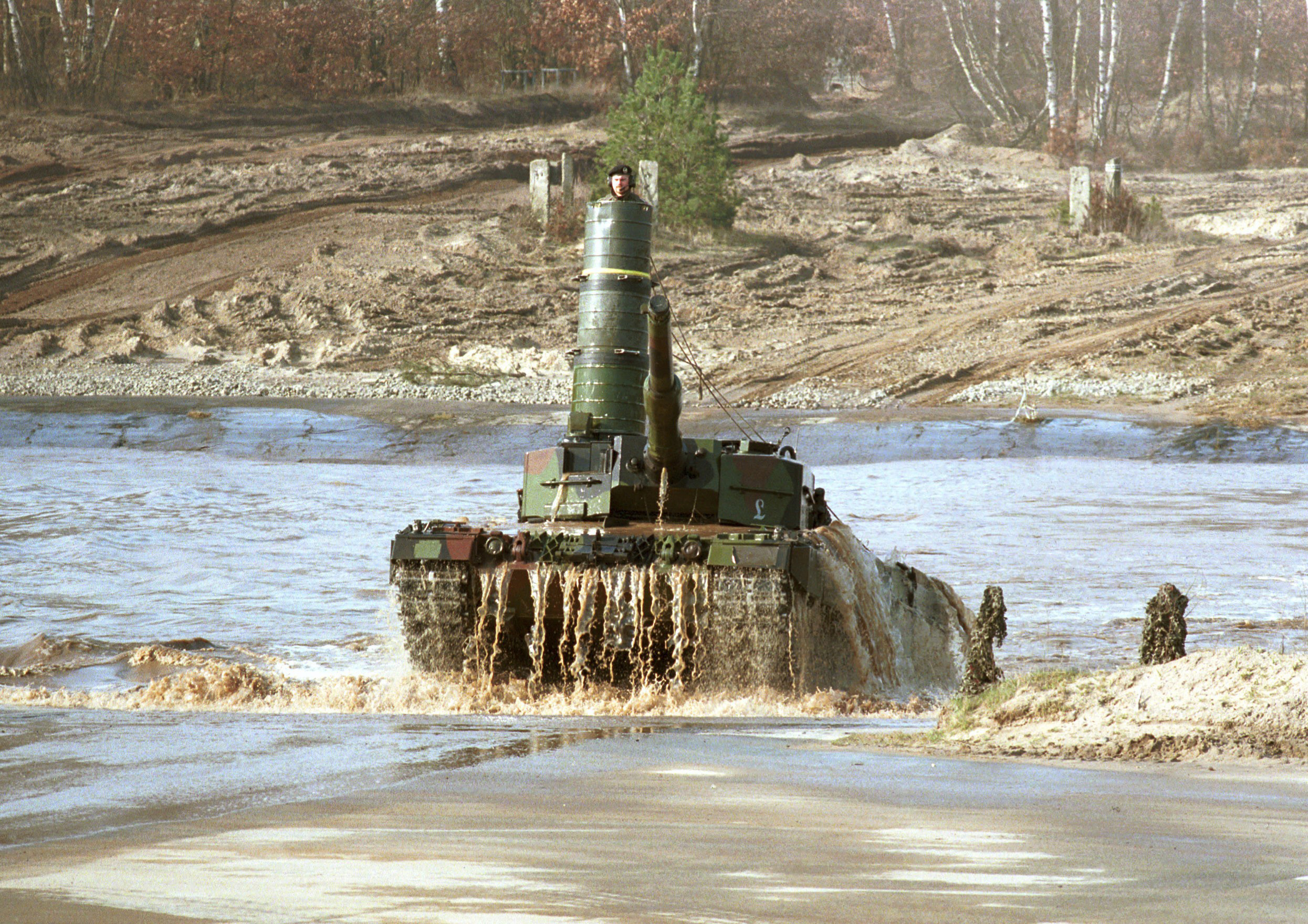
German Leopard 2A4 with turret snorkel, 2010

== World War II ==
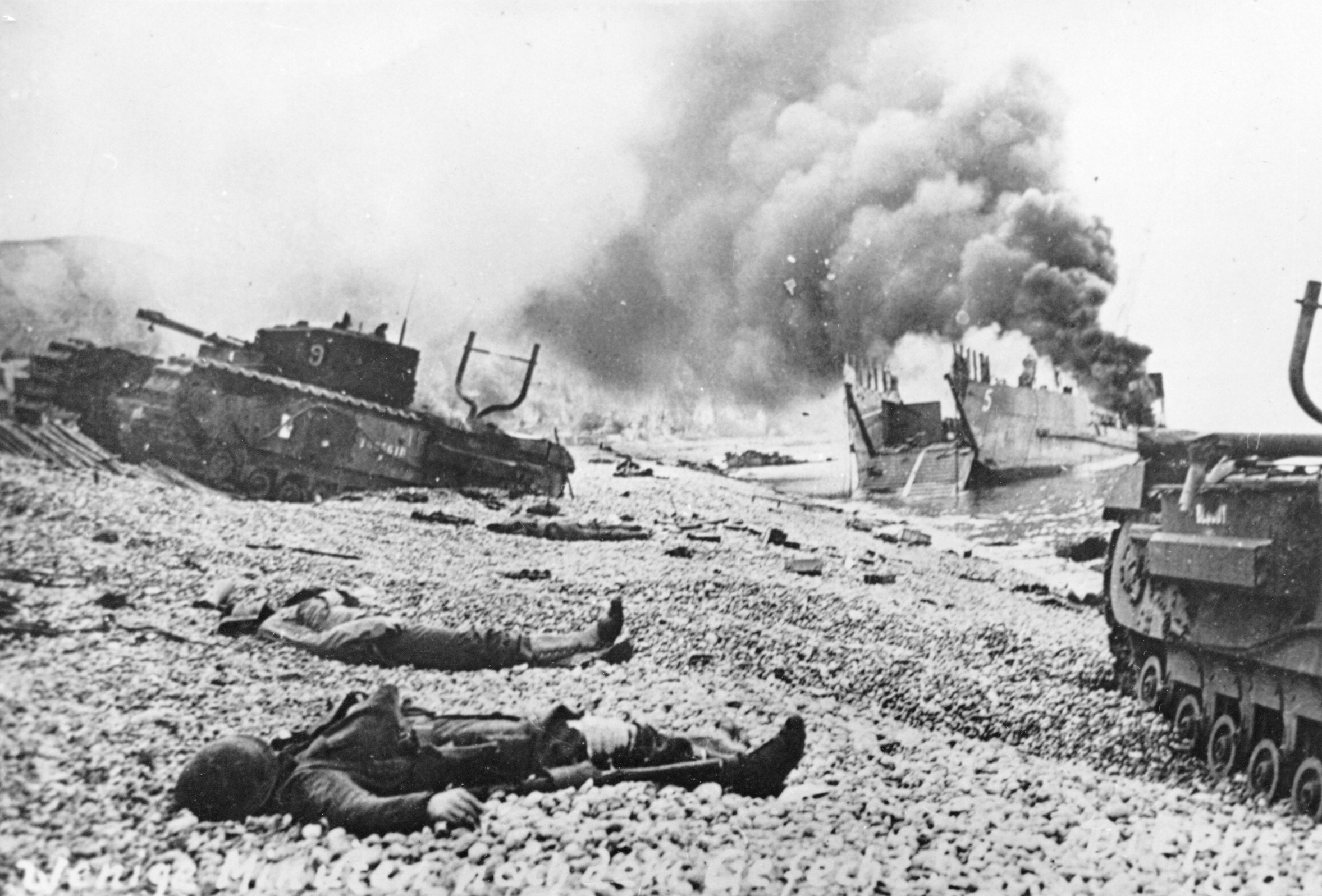
Churchill tanks on the Dieppe beach. The Y-shaped pipes on the rear decking are exhaust pipe extensions to allow deep wading.

Although Duplex Drive allowed landing craft to release tanks farther from shore, the alternative deep wading gear permitted a tank to drive partially or completely underwater on the sea floor rather than swim. Deep wading Churchills took part in the 1942 Dieppe raid, and also operated during the D-Day assault. These tanks were given waterproofed hulls and air intake and exhaust trunking to allow them to come ashore from shallow water. Tall ducts extended from the engine deck to above the turret top and they needed to stay above water. The front duct was the air intake for the engine and crew compartment, the rear duct vented the exhaust. This device saw use in many amphibious operations, it was also used on light tanks and tank destroyers. The US had similar devices for trucks and jeeps.

The Germans gave their Tiger tank a long snorkel, essentially a long tube on the commander's hatch that allowed it to wade through up to four metres of water, as well as rubber gaskets on all openings. This was necessary because the large tank was too heavy for most bridges in Europe and Russia at the time, meaning that they had to be able to deep ford across rivers when a bridge was not available. The Tiger was the first tank to come with deep fording ability as designed, although the earlier Tauchpanzer, a modification of the Panzer III and Panzer IV, was designed to drive on the sea-bed, part of the German preparations for Operation Sea Lion, the planned invasion of Britain in 1941. A long, flexible rubber hose with a floating buoy on the end supplied the engine and crew with air and gave the waterproofed tank a maximum diving depth of 15 metres (49 ft) making it an extreme example of a wading tank. They were also extremely unpopular with their crew, because they were in danger of breaking down in deep water and drowning the crew. Since the crew was unable to see where they were going, direction was given by means of radio and a spotter on the surface. The Germans eventually converted 168 Panzer IIIs and 42 Panzer IVs into Tauchpanzers, although they were never used for their intended purpose in the end.

== Post-war ==
Two German Army Leopard 2 tanks demonstrate deep wading.

Most modern tanks since the 1960s may deep ford. This allows heavy main battle tanks to cross rivers even where existing river crossings are inadequate, destroyed, or heavily defended. During the Cold War, deep fording was particularly valuable to NATO and Soviet forces in Europe where operations required numerous river crossings.

Common NATO practice is to provide a vehicle snorkel that is wide enough to be a crew escape route. A single long tube is typically fitted to the crew hatch on the turret; the large tube normally brought to the crossing area by supporting vehicles. The Leopard 2 uses a snorkel assembled by stacking shorter rings; the tube's height is limited to about three metres and is mounted on the crew commander's hatch.

All modern Soviet/Russian tanks since the 1960s (such as the T-55, T-72, T-90) may deep ford. Russian snorkels are only a few inches wide; they may be carried by tanks and erected in minutes. Underwater crossings are unpopular with crews as escape is impossible through such small snorkels; a stuck or disabled tank must be towed back to the surface before the crew can exit. Large diameter snorkels are often used in exercises for safety.

== See also ==
- BARV
