= Fort Henry, Dorset =

Bunker in Studland, Dorset, England

Coordinates: 50°38′43″N 1°56′52″W

Fort Henry
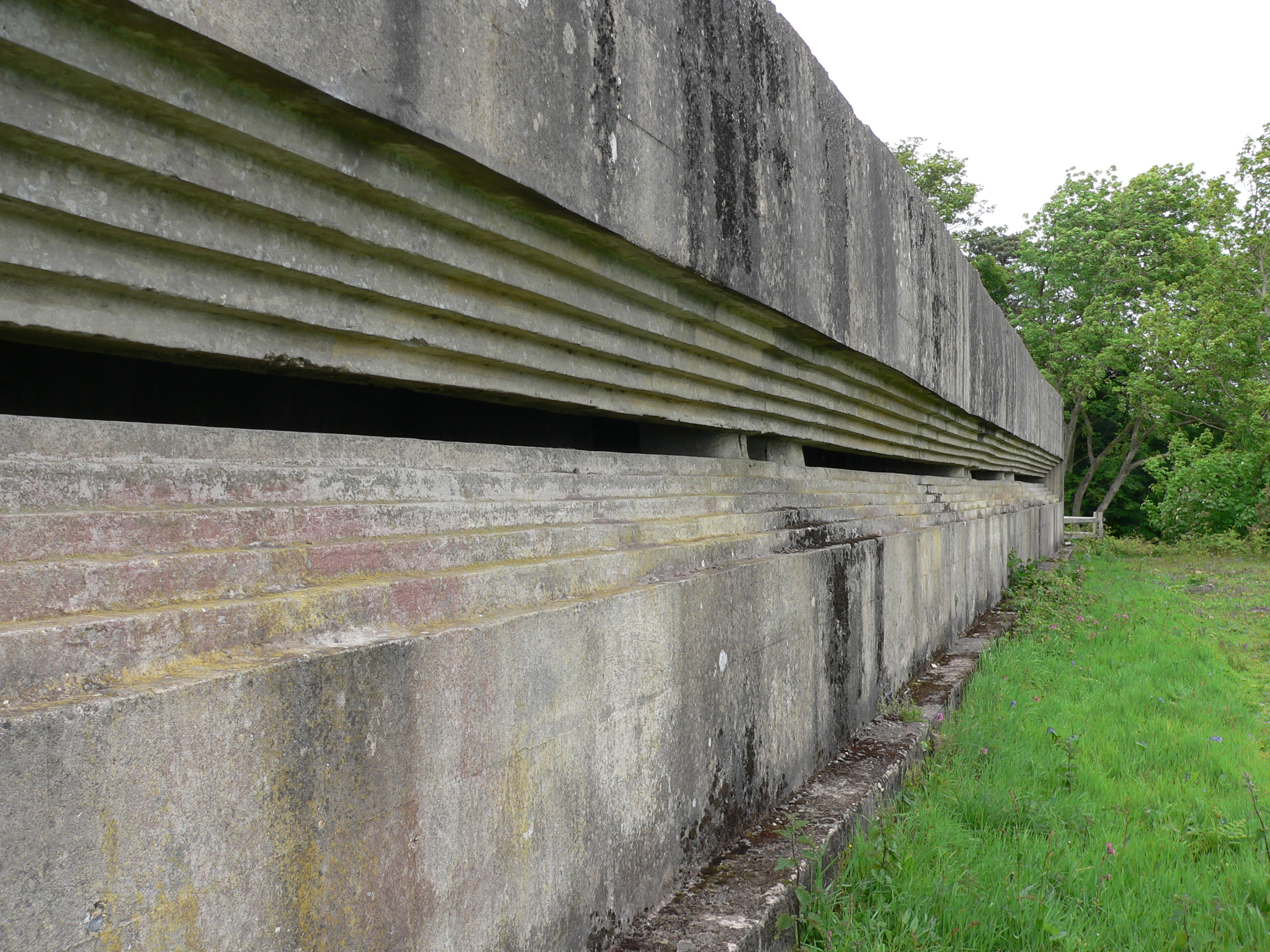
- Interactive map of the Fort Henry area

General information
- Location: Redend Point, Studland, Dorset
- Year built: September-October 1943
- Owner: National Trust

Design and construction
- Architects: B.H. Darwin, A.J.E. Smith, J.W. Thomas

Fort Henry is a World War Two observation bunker overlooking Studland Bay, in Dorset. It was constructed during September-October 1943 by 12 Field Company, Royal Canadian Engineers for Exercise Pirate, the first large scale, live fire, rehearsal for the Normandy Landings. Lieutenant-General H.D.G. Crerar ordered the construction of the observation post for senior officers and politicians to watch the exercise.

In 2012, English Heritage Grade II listed the building. Located at the top of Redend Point, on a small sandstone promontory, the bunker is 90 feet (27 m) long with walls, floor and ceiling all 3 feet (0.91 m) thick. There is an 80 feet (24 m) wide recessed observation slit. The origin of the name Fort Henry is unknown, but it is likely named after Fort Henry in Kingston, Ontario.

Today, it is owned by the National Trust and forms part of the Studland Beach Second World War walk.

An English Heritage spokesman commented following the bunker's listing on 20 November 2012:

"Fort Henry provides an impression of the scale and significance of the preparations for D-Day and is associated with the most prominent figures of the Allied forces.

"Studland Bay is known for its beaches and wildlife but it is great that its role in the Second World War has now been recognised."

== D-Day Training Exercises ==
The main exercises and spectators which used Fort Henry were:

Exercise Pirate – 17 October 1943; Lieutenant-General Crerar (1 Canadian Corps); commander of 21 Army Group General Sir Bernard Paget, Canadian Minister for Munitions and Supply C.D. Howe, and commander of the British 1 Corps Lieutenant-General John Crocker.

Exercise Vidi – 28 November 1943; Paget watched from Fort Henry and other senior commanders including Lieutenant-General John Crocker and Major General Rod Keller watched from a Landing Ship Infantry.

Exercise Savvy – 12 February 1944; King George VI, Bernard Montgomery, Admiral Sir Bertram Ramsey, Chief of Staff to 21 Army Group Freddy De Guingand, Commander of Allied Expeditionary Air Force Air Marshall Trafford Leigh-Mallory, and commander British Second Army Lieutenant-General Miles Dempsey.

Exercise Smash III – 18 April 1944; Montgomery, Dempsey, Ramsey, commander of the Eastern Naval Task Force Rear Admiral Sir Phillip Vian, commander of naval Force G Commodore Sir Cyril Douglas-Pennant, commander British 30 Corps Lieutenant-General Gerrald Bucknell, and Secretary of State for Air Sir Archibald Sinclair.

== Exercise Smash I-IV ==
Until 2026, it was widely believed that King George VI, Winston Churchill, Dwight D. Eisenhower, Omar Bradley, Lord Louis Mountbatten and Alan Brooke attended either Exercise Smash I (4 April 1944) or Smash III (18 April 1944) conducted by 50 (Northumbrian) Division and Force G. However, a review of private diaries and official records by local historian Dante Dunbabin concluded that this was incorrect.

On 4 April 1944, during Exercise Smash I, a trial run of Duplex Drive Valentine tanks ran into difficulty when a change in the weather adversely affected the sea conditions. Six stricken tanks sank with the loss of six crew members. The lesson learned from this trial was the tanks would not survive being launched too far from the beach and consequently on D-Day itself the tanks were released in shallow water. The remains of the tanks were protected as a scheduled monument in 2019.

== See also ==
- British hardened field defences of World War II
- Operation Overlord
