= Tychsen =

Tychsen is a typical Danish surname meaning son of Tycho/Tych after the Danish patronymic naming system. The German form of the name is Tuxen. Tychsen ranks in the top 1000 names in Denmark according to Larsen, Danmarks Statitik 2004.

Both notable orientalists below were born in the Tonder region of Denmark and took up professorships in prominent universities located in Prussian provinces, now Germany.

Notable people with the surname include:

- Andrew C. Tychsen (1893–1986), United States Army brigadier general
- Christian Tychsen, Danish governor
- Christian Tychsen, German recipient of the Knight's Cross of the Iron Cross
- Jens Jacob Tychsen (born 1975), Danish film and TV actor and a voice actor and director
- Thomas Christian Tychsen (1758–1834), German orientalist and Lutheran theologian
- Oluf Gerhard Tychsen (1734–1815), German Orientalist and Hebrew scholar
