= Malin Craig =

13th Chief of Staff of the United States Army

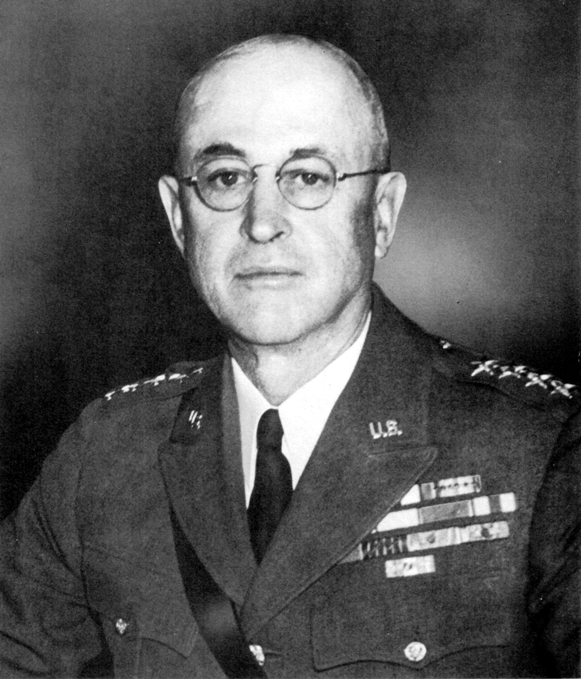
- Craig in 1937
- Born: 5 August 1875; Saint Joseph, Missouri, United States
- Died: 25 July 1945 (aged 69); Walter Reed Hospital, Washington, D.C., United States
- Burial place: Arlington National Cemetery, Virginia, United States
- Military career
- Allegiance: United States
- Branch: United States Army
- Service years: 1898–1939; 1941–1945
- Rank: General
- Service number: 0-86
- Units: Infantry Branch; Cavalry Branch
- Commands: Chief of Staff of the United States Army; United States Army War College; Panama Canal Zone; United States Army Cavalry School
- Conflicts: Spanish–American War; China Relief Expedition; Philippine–American War; World War I: Meuse-Argonne Offensive; World War II
- Awards: Army Distinguished Service Medal (3)

Malin Craig (5 August 1875 – 25 July 1945) was a general in the United States Army who served as the 14th Chief of Staff of the United States Army from 1935 to 1939. He served in World War I and was recalled to active duty during World War II. He played a large role in preparing the U.S. Army for the conflict.

== Early life ==
Craig was born on 5 August 1875, in Saint Joseph, Missouri, a son of Army officer Louis A. Craig and Georgie (Malin) Craig. His siblings included Louis A. Craig and his paternal grandfather was James Craig. He entered the United States Military Academy (USMA) at West Point, New York on 20 June 1894. He graduated on 26 April 1898, and was ranked 33rd of 59. He was commissioned as a second lieutenant in the Infantry branch. Craig's initial assignment was to the 4th Infantry Regiment.

== Early career ==
On 23 June 1898, Craig transferred to the Cavalry branch, and he was assigned to the 6th Cavalry Regiment during the Santiago Campaign, the United States invasion of Cuba during the Spanish–American War. After his return from Cuba, Craig transferred to the 4th Cavalry Regiment, serving in Wyoming and Oklahoma until 1900, when he served in the China Relief Expedition and in the Philippine Insurrection until 1902. He was promoted to first lieutenant on 2 February 1901, transferring back to the 6th Cavalry.

Craig attended the Infantry and Cavalry School from 1903 to 1904 and the Staff College from 1904 to 1905. He was promoted to captain on 7 May 1904, assigned to the 10th Cavalry Regiment and later the 1st Cavalry Regiment. Craig was garrisoned as a regimental quartermaster at Fort Clark in Kinney, Texas from 1906 to 1909. He would go on to graduate from the Army War College in 1910, where Hunter Liggett was among his classmates, and serve in a variety of administrative positions, most notable of which was assigning troops to their regiments.

He served with the 1st Cavalry Regiment in the western United States in 1912, then became an instructor at Fort Leavenworth, Kansas Army Service Schools, where he served in 1916 and 1917. He transferred to the General Staff Corps in 1917.

== World War I ==
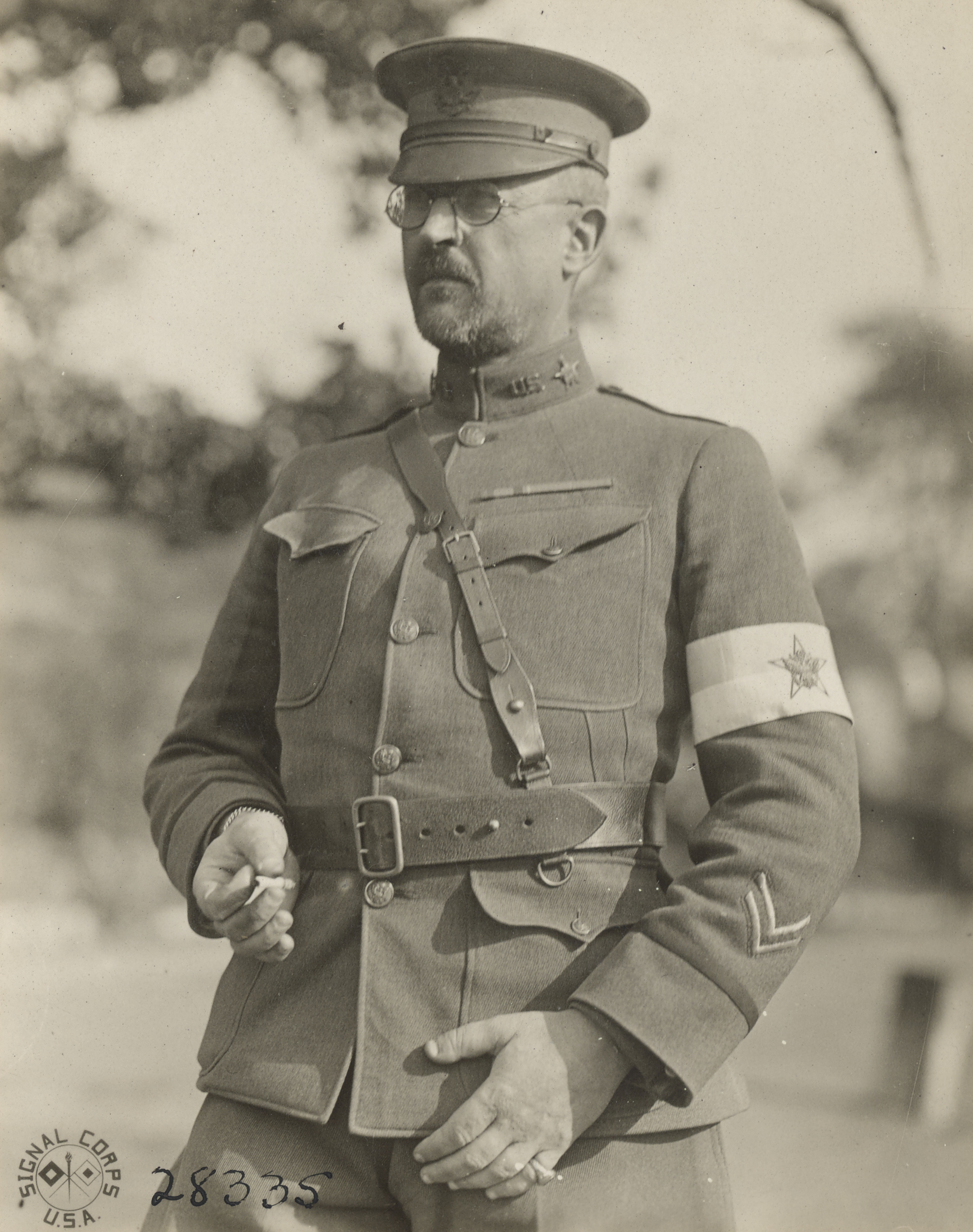
Craig as a brigadier general in France, October 1918

Craig was promoted to major on 15 May 1917, shortly after the American entry into World War I. He was promoted to temporary lieutenant colonel on 17 August and temporary colonel on 27 March 1918.

Craig served in France during World War I as chief of staff to General Hunter Liggett in the 41st Division and later in I Corps, where he was promoted to temporary brigadier general on 11 July 1918. He then became chief of staff of the Third Army. He received the Army Distinguished Service Medal for his service during the war. His citation reads as follows:

General Craig served in turn as Chief of Staff of a division, a corps, and an Army, in each of which capacities he exhibited great ability. His personal influence, aggressiveness, and untiring efforts were repeatedly displayed in the operations of the 1st Corps in the vicinity of Chateau-Thierry, on the Oureq, and the Vesle during the St. Mihiel and Argonne-Meuse offensives.

== Interwar period ==
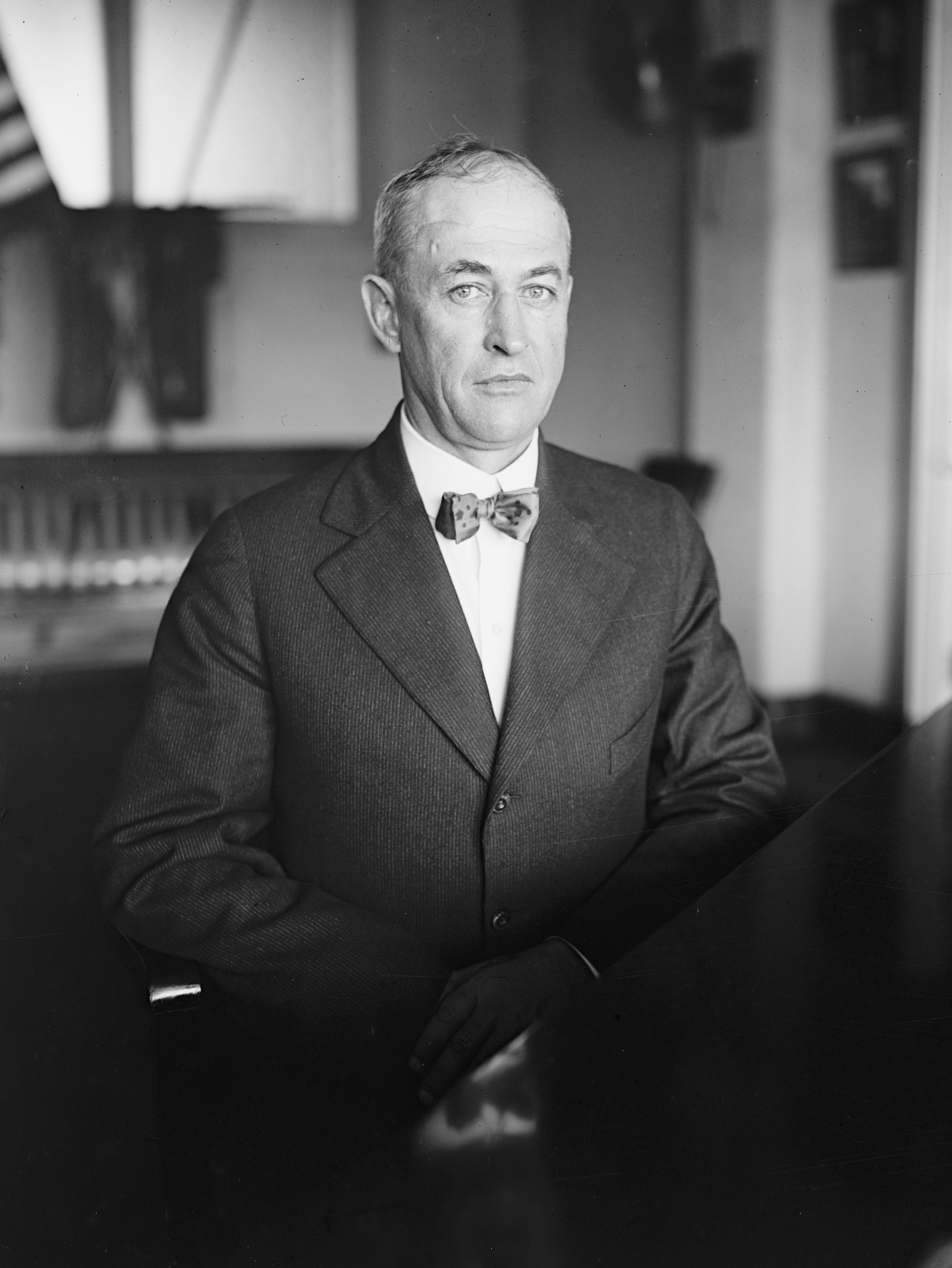
Craig as Chief of Cavalry in 1924

After the war, Craig reverted to his permanent rank of major on 15 August 1919, but was promoted to colonel on 1 July 1920, and to brigadier general only 15 days later.

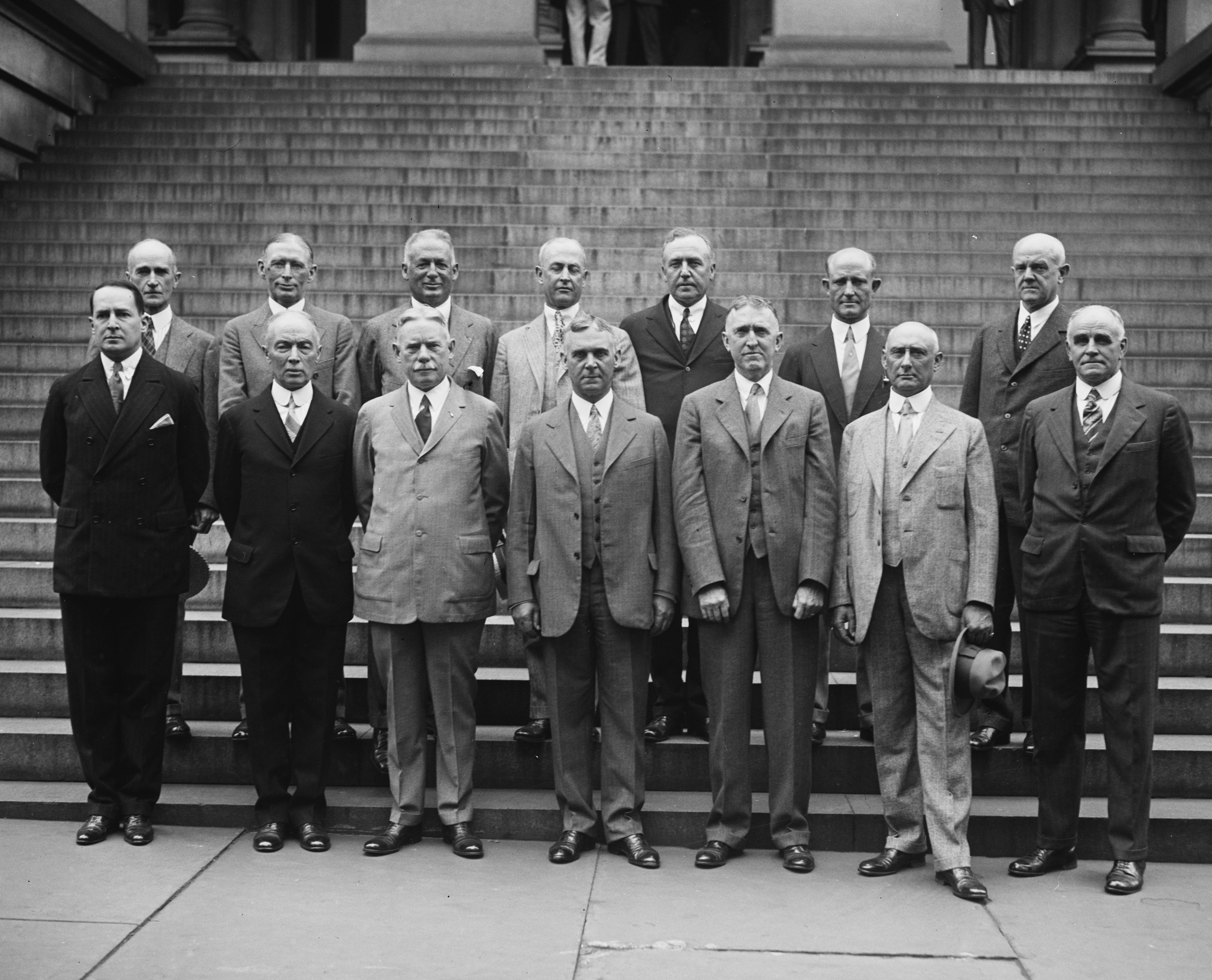
Corps area commanders and division commanders meet with the army chief of staff, Major General Charles Pelot Summerall, at the War Department, May 1927. Stood in the back row, directly in the center, is Major General Malin Craig, commanding??.

When Craig was promoted to colonel, he was put in command of the District of Arizona in 1920 and became the commandant of the Cavalry School from 1921 to 1923, after his promotion to brigadier general in April 1921. He served as Chief of Cavalry with the rank of major general from 24 July 1924, to 20 March 1926. He was succeeded by Herbert B. Crosby, after which he was assigned to command the Panama Canal Zone from 1 April 1928 to 30 August 1930.

Craig served as the commander of the Ninth Corps Area, headquartered in San Francisco, from 21 November 1930 to 24 January 1935.

== Chief of Staff ==
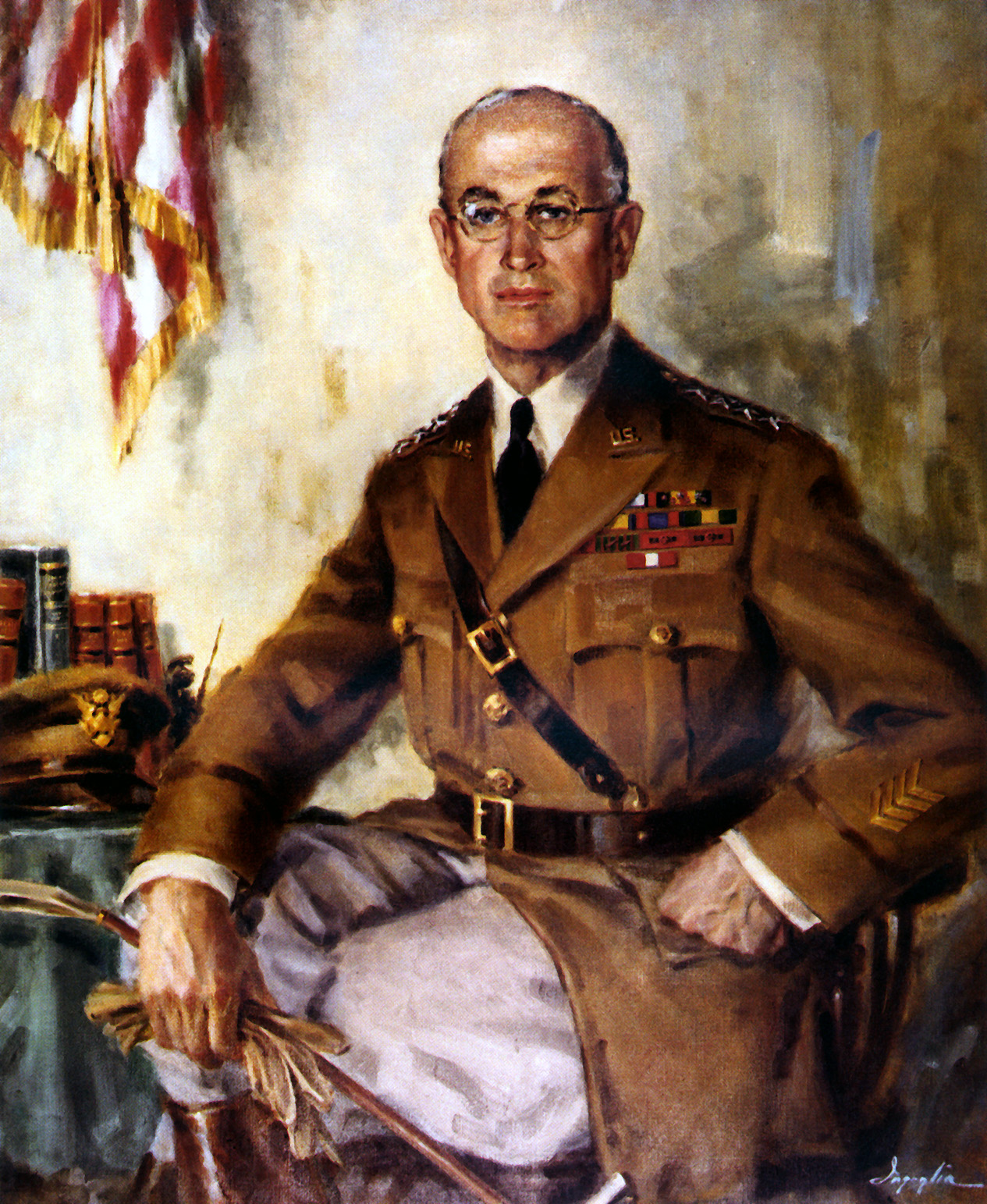
Army portrait of Craig

Craig served as president of the Army War College in 1935, before being selected as Chief of Staff of the United States Army. He served as chief of staff from 2 October 1935 to 31 August 1939, succeeding General Douglas MacArthur and preceding George C. Marshall. That appointment carried with it a temporary promotion to full (four-star) general.

As Chief of Staff of the Army, Craig pointed out to Congress the army's lack of preparedness in manpower and material, stressed the necessity of lead time in military preparedness, focused attention on army planning, and, within governmental constraints, prepared the army for World War II. Craig, who opposed any mission for the Air Corps except that of supporting ground forces, also actively opposed the movement for a separate air force, and also refused to acknowledge the superiority of a four-engined bomber over all other types. This caused the cut back on planned purchases of B-17s to procure smaller but cheaper (and inferior) twin-engine light and medium bombers such as the Douglas B-18.

He retired, with the rank of general, on 31 August 1939, after forty-one years of active duty service. Upon his retirement, he received a second Distinguished Service Medal for his service as Army Chief of Staff.

== World War II and death ==
Craig's retirement was short-lived, however. On 26 September 1941, with war on the horizon, he was recalled to active duty to head the War Department's Personnel Board, a body responsible for selecting individuals who were to receive direct commissions in the army. He headed the board until shortly before his death.

Craig died at Walter Reed Hospital in Washington, D.C., on 25 July 1945, where he had been ill for the previous year. He was posthumously awarded a third Distinguished Service Medal and was buried at Arlington National Cemetery.

== Personal life ==
In April 1901, Craig married Genevieve Woodruff, a daughter of General Charles Woodruff. They were the parents of a son, Malin Craig Jr. (1902–1981). Malin Craig Jr. was a career Army officer and World War II veteran who retired as a colonel. After his military retirement, he taught geometry in the public schools of Montgomery County, Maryland.

== Awards ==

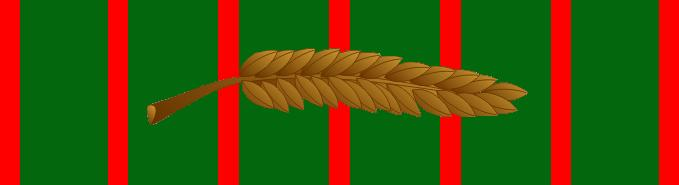

1st Row	Army Distinguished Service Medal with two oak leaf clusters		Spanish Campaign Medal	
2nd Row	China Relief Expedition Medal	Philippine Campaign Medal	Mexican Border Service Medal	World War I Victory Medal with five battle clasps
3rd Row	Army of Occupation of Germany Medal	American Defense Service Medal	American Campaign Medal	World War II Victory Medal
4th Row	Companion of the Order of the Bath (United Kingdom)	Commandeur of the Legion of Honor (France)	Croix de guerre 1914–1918 with Palm (France)	Commander of the Order of the Crown (Belgium)
5th Row	Commander of the Order of the Crown of Italy	Order of Abdon Calderón, 1st Class (Ecuador)	Order of Military Merit 1st Class in White	Missouri State Medal of Merit

== Dates of rank ==
No insignia	Cadet, United States Military Academy: 20 June 1894
No pin insignia in 1898	Second lieutenant, Regular Army: 26 April 1898
	First lieutenant, Regular Army: 2 February 1901
	Captain, Regular Army: 7 May 1904
	Major, Regular Army: 15 May 1917
	Lieutenant colonel, National Army: 17 August 1917 (date of rank was 5 August 1917)
	Colonel, National Army: 27 March 1918 (date of rank was 6 February 1918)
	Brigadier general, National Army: 11 July 1918 (date of rank was 26 June 1918)
	Major, Regular Army: 15 August 1919 (reverted to permanent rank)
	Colonel, Regular Army: 1 July 1920
	Brigadier general, Regular Army: 16 July 1920 (date of rank was 3 July 1920)
	Colonel, Regular Army: 4 March 1921 (reverted to permanent rank)
	Brigadier general, Regular Army: 9 May 1921 (date of rank was 28 April 1921)
	Major general, temporary: 24 July 1924
	Major general, Regular Army: 21 March 1926
	General, temporary: 2 October 1935
	General, retired list: 31 August 1939
	General, retired on active duty: 26 September 1941 (recalled to active duty)

== Bibliography ==
- Bell, William G. (2013). Commanding generals and chiefs of staff, 1775–2013 : portraits & biographical sketches of the United States Army's senior officer (PDF). Washington, D.C.: United States Army Center of Military History. Archived from the original (PDF) on 4 June 2014.
- Davis, Henry Blaine Jr. (1998). Generals in Khaki. Raleigh, North Carolina: Pentland Press. ISBN 1571970886. OCLC 40298151.
- Zabecki, David T.; Mastriano, Douglas V., eds. (2020). Pershing's Lieutenants: American Military Leadership in World War I. New York, NY: Osprey Publishing. ISBN 978-1-4728-3863-6.
- Official Register of the United States Army. 1945. The Adjutant General. Washington, D.C. p. 1,135.

Military offices
Preceded by George H. Cameron	Commandant of the Army Cavalry School; 1921–1923	Succeeded by ??
Preceded by Douglas MacArthur	Chief of Staff of the United States Army; 1935−1939	Succeeded by George C. Marshall
