= Edward A. Silk =

United States Army officer (1916–1955)

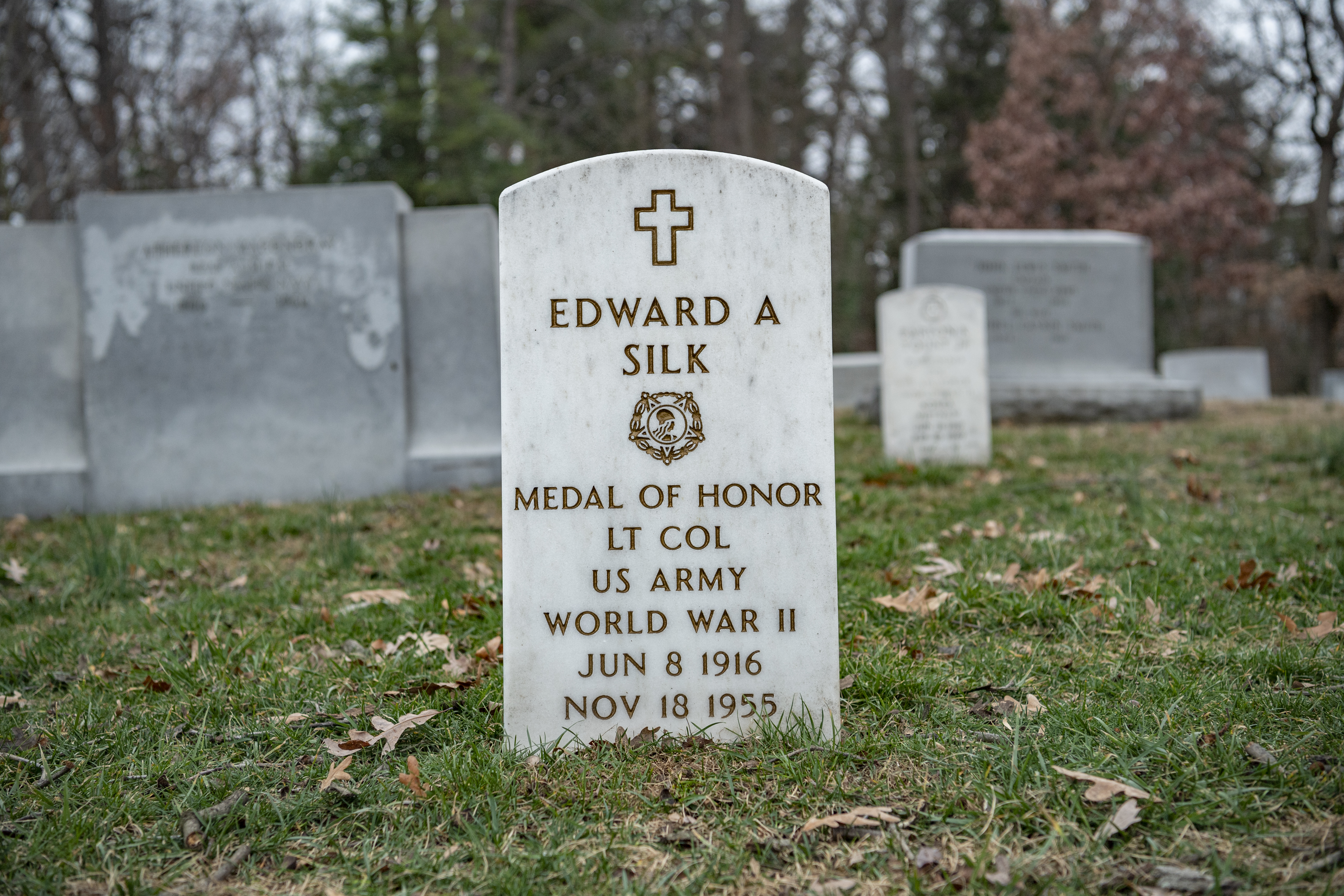
- Grave at Arlington National Cemetery
- Born: June 8, 1916; Johnstown, Pennsylvania, US
- Died: November 18, 1955 (aged 39); New York, US
- Burial place: Arlington National Cemetery
- Military career
- Allegiance: United States
- Branch: United States Army
- Service years: 1941–1955
- Rank: Lieutenant Colonel
- Units: 398th Infantry Regiment, 100th Infantry Division
- Conflicts: World War II
- Awards: Medal of Honor; Silver Star

Edward A. Silk (June 8, 1916 – November 18, 1955) was a United States Army officer and a recipient of the United States military's highest decoration (the Medal of Honor) for his actions in World War II.

Silk joined the army from his birth city of Johnstown, Pennsylvania, in April 1941, and by November 23, 1944, was serving as a first lieutenant in Company E, 398th Infantry Regiment, 100th Infantry Division. On that day, near St. Pravel, France, he single-handedly attacked a German-held farmhouse and captured the soldiers inside. He was awarded the Medal of Honor a year later, on November 1, 1945.

Silk reached the rank of lieutenant colonel before he died at age 39 from complications from a peptic ulcer and was buried in Arlington National Cemetery, Arlington County, Virginia.

== Medal of Honor citation ==
Silk's official Medal of Honor citation reads:

1st Lt. Edward A. Silk commanded the weapons platoon of Company E, 398th Infantry, on 23 November 1944, when the end battalion was assigned the mission of seizing high ground overlooking Moyenmoutier, France, prior to an attack on the city itself. His company jumped off in the lead at dawn and by noon had reached the edge of a woods in the vicinity of St. Pravel where scouts saw an enemy sentry standing guard before a farmhouse in a valley below. One squad, engaged in reconnoitering the area, was immediately pinned down by intense machinegun and automatic-weapons fire from within the house. Skillfully deploying his light machinegun section, 1st Lt. Silk answered enemy fire, but when 15 minutes had elapsed with no slackening of resistance, he decided to eliminate the strong point by a one-man attack. Running 100 yards across an open field to the shelter of a low stone wall directly in front of the farmhouse, he fired into the door and windows with his carbine; then, in full view of the enemy, vaulted the wall and dashed 50 yards through a hail of bullets to the left side of the house, where he hurled a grenade through a window, silencing a machinegun and killing 2 gunners. In attempting to move to the right side of the house he drew fire from a second machinegun emplaced in the woodshed. With magnificent courage he rushed this position in the face of direct fire and succeeded in neutralizing the weapon and killing the 2 gunners by throwing grenades into the structure. His supply of grenades was by now exhausted, but undaunted, he dashed back to the side of the farmhouse and began to throw rocks through a window, demanding the surrender of the remaining enemy. Twelve Germans, overcome by his relentless assault and confused by his unorthodox methods, gave up to the lone American. By his gallant willingness to assume the full burden of the attack and the intrepidity with which he carried out his extremely hazardous mission, 1st Lt. Silk enabled his battalion to continue its advance and seize its objective.

== Awards and Decorations ==

Badge	Combat Infantryman Badge		
1st row	Medal of Honor	Silver Star	Bronze Star Medal Retroactively Awarded, 1947
2nd row	Purple Heart	American Defense Service Medal	American Campaign Medal
3rd row	European–African–Middle Eastern Campaign Medal with 2 Campaign stars	World War II Victory Medal	National Defense Service Medal

100th Infantry Division Insignia

== See also ==
- List of Medal of Honor recipients
