= Louis A. Craig =

United States Army general (1891–1984)

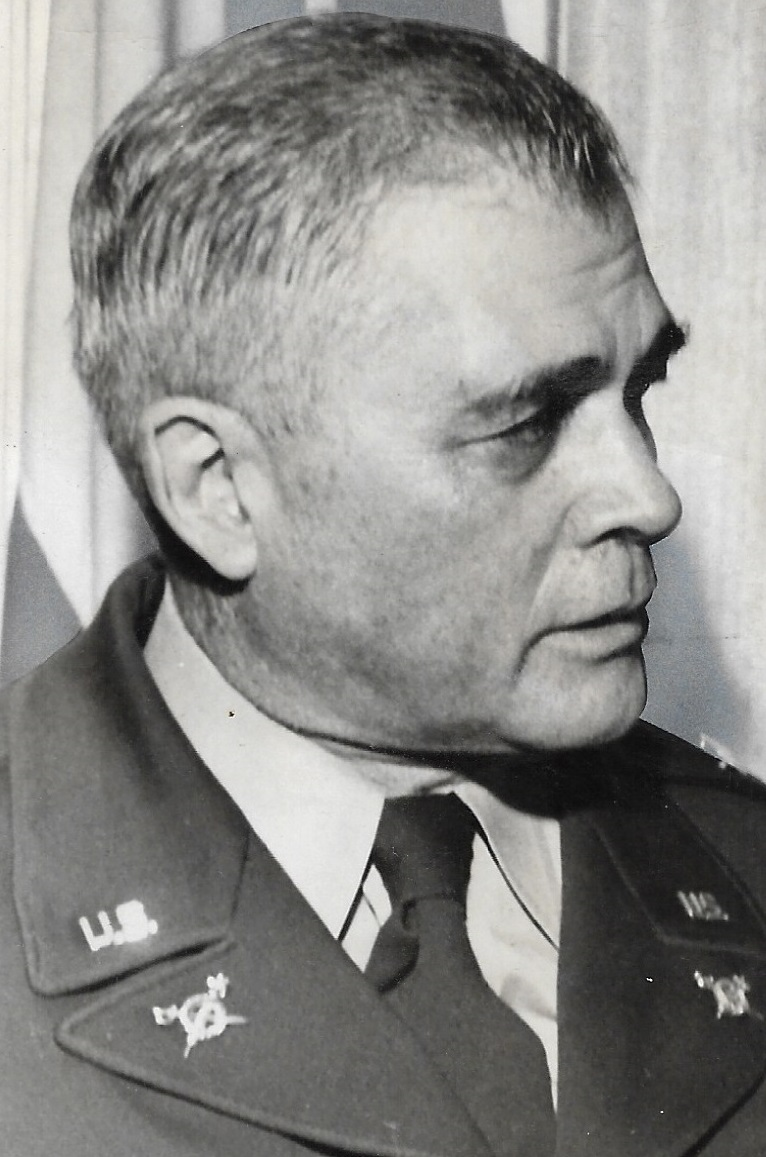
- Cropped closeup from 1948 original by Times-Picayune (New Orleans, LA).
- Born: July 29, 1891; West Point, New York, United States
- Died: January 3, 1984 (aged 92); Washington, D.C., United States
- Burial place: Arlington National Cemetery, Virginia, United States
- Spouse: Miriam Blount (m. 1917–1984, his death)
- Children: 8
- Relatives: Malin Craig (brother); James Craig (grandfather)
- Military career
- Branch: United States Army
- Service years: 1913–1952
- Rank: Major general
- Service number: 0-3575
- Unit: Cavalry Branch
- Commands: 1st Battalion, 77th Field Artillery Regiment; 18th Field Artillery Regiment; 72nd Field Artillery Brigade; 97th Infantry Division; XXIII Corps; 9th Infantry Division; XX Corps; Seventh Service Command; Sixth Service Command; United States Constabulary; Inspector General of the Army
- Conflicts: World War I World War II
- Awards: Army Distinguished Service Medal; Silver Star; Legion of Merit; Bronze Star Medal

Louis A. Craig (July 29, 1891 – January 3, 1984) was a career officer in the United States Army. He attained the rank of major general, and served in both World War I and World War II. Craig served as a corps and division commander during World War II and was the Inspector General of the Army from 1948 to 1952.

== Early life and military career ==
Louis Aleck Craig Jr. was born at West Point, New York, on July 29, 1891, a son of a United States Army officer, Louis Aleck Craig, and Georgie (Malin) Craig. His siblings included brother Malin Craig and his paternal grandfather was James Craig. After graduating from St. Luke's, a Catholic prep school in Wayne, Pennsylvania, Craig attended the United States Military Academy (USMA). He received his commission as a second lieutenant of Cavalry after graduating in June 1913, ranked 56th of 93.

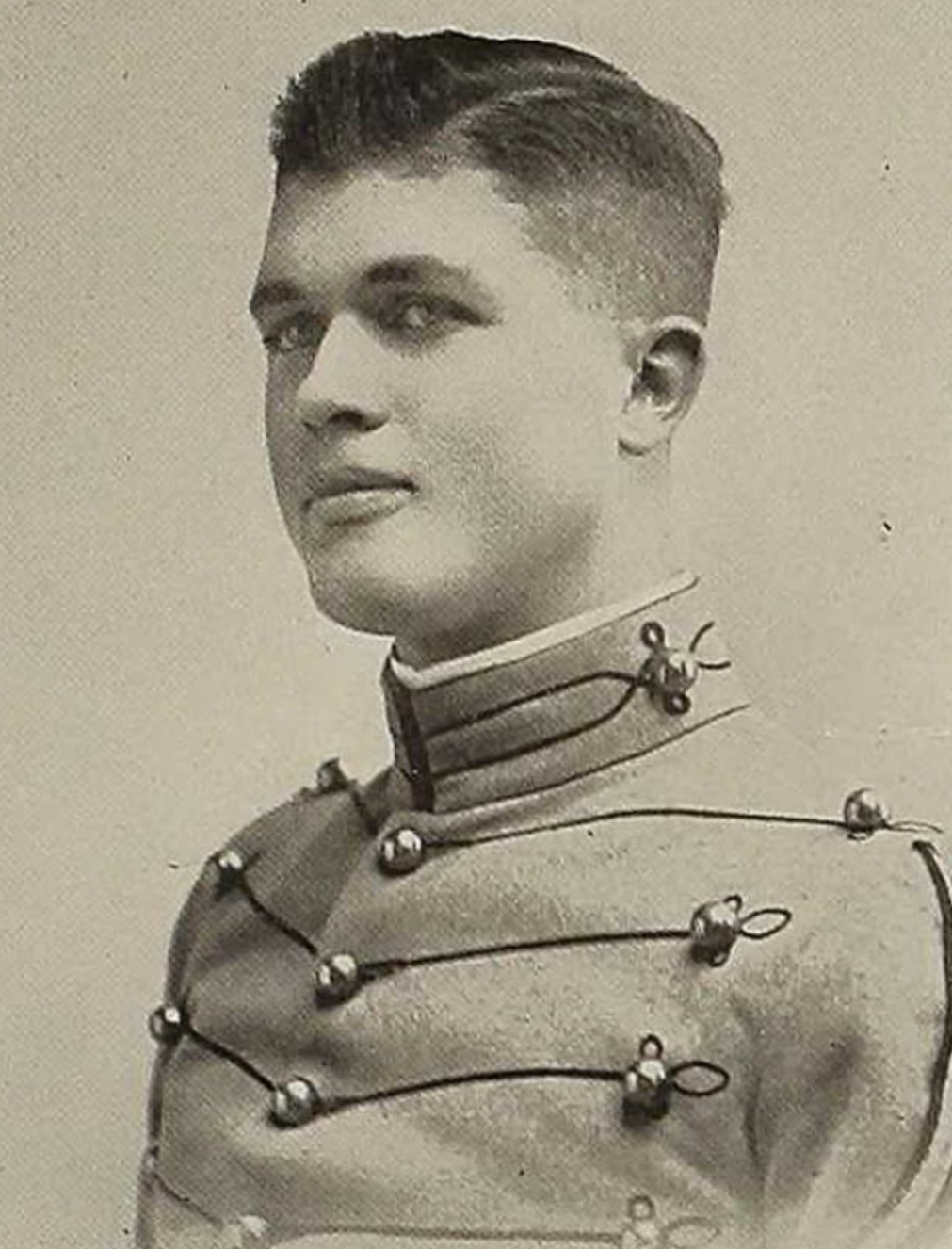
Craig as a West Point senior in 1913.

After graduation, Craig was initially assigned to the 5th Cavalry Regiment and served at Fort Huachuca, Arizona, from October to December 1913, and Fort Myer, Virginia, from January to April 1914. In March 1914 Craig transferred to the Coast Artillery Corps and was assigned to Fort Hamilton, New York. His subsequent assignments included Fort Howard, Maryland, and Fort Grant, Panama Canal Zone. In August 1916, Craig transferred from the Coast Artillery to the Field Artillery Branch and served with the 4th Field Artillery Regiment at Corozal, Panama Canal Zone.

== World War I ==
In April 1917 the U.S. entered World War I, and in June Craig returned to the United States and was assigned as an instructor for the officer training camp based at Madison Barracks, New York. In August he was assigned to command a battery of the replacement battalion based in Syracuse, New York. The battalion sailed for France in November 1917 and upon arrival in December, Craig was assigned to the 5th Field Artillery Regiment, 1st Division. After serving as the regimental adjutant for the next three months, he was selected for attendance at the American Expeditionary Forces Staff College in Langres. After his May 1918 graduation, Craig was assigned to the staff of I Corps as assistant plans and training officer (assistant G-3).

In June Craig was assigned to the 157th Field Artillery Brigade, 82nd Division, as its adjutant, and the following month he was posted to the 4th Division as assistant G-3. From August to October, he was adjutant of the 4th Field Artillery Brigade, 4th Division, and from October to November he was assistant to the chief of artillery for the newly created Second Army.

== Post-World War I ==
Following the Armistice of 11 November 1918 that ended the war, Craig served as chief of staff for the American Section of the Permanent International Armistice Commission in France. In February, 1919, he was posted to Trier, Germany to serve on the staff of the Army Center of Artillery Study. He served with the 17th Field Artillery Regiment at Ehrenbreitstein, Germany before returning to the United States with the regiment. He remained with the 17th Field Artillery at Camp Travis, San Antonio, Texas, until August, 1920, when he returned to the Coast Artillery Corps. Craig was then posted to Fort Barrancas, Florida, as adjutant, followed by assignment to Fort McPherson, Georgia, on the Fourth Corps Area staff.

Craig completed the advanced course for officers at Fort Sill, Oklahoma's Field Artillery School in 1923. He was then assigned as assistant professor of military science at Harvard University, where he remained until 1929, when he was selected for attendance at the United States Army Command and General Staff College. He graduated in 1931 and was assigned to Savannah, Georgia, as the senior instructor for the Georgia National Guard. From 1933 to 1936, Craig served as assistant inspector general for the Second Corps Area at Governors Island, New York, and he carried out a similar assignment for the Third Corps Area in Baltimore from 1936 to 1938. In 1938, Craig was nominated for attendance at the United States Army War College, and he graduated in 1939. He was then posted to Fort Sill as commander of 1st Battalion, 77th Field Artillery Regiment.

== World War II ==
In July, 1941 Craig was assigned as commander of the 18th Field Artillery Regiment at Fort Sill. In February, 1942 Craig was promoted to brigadier general and assigned as commander of the 72nd Field Artillery Brigade at Fort Leonard Wood, Missouri. He was promoted to major general in February, 1943 as commander of the 97th Infantry Division at Camp Swift, Texas. In January, 1944 Craig was named to command the XXIII Corps at Camp Bowie, Texas. In August, 1944, he was assigned to command the 9th Infantry Division during combat in France.

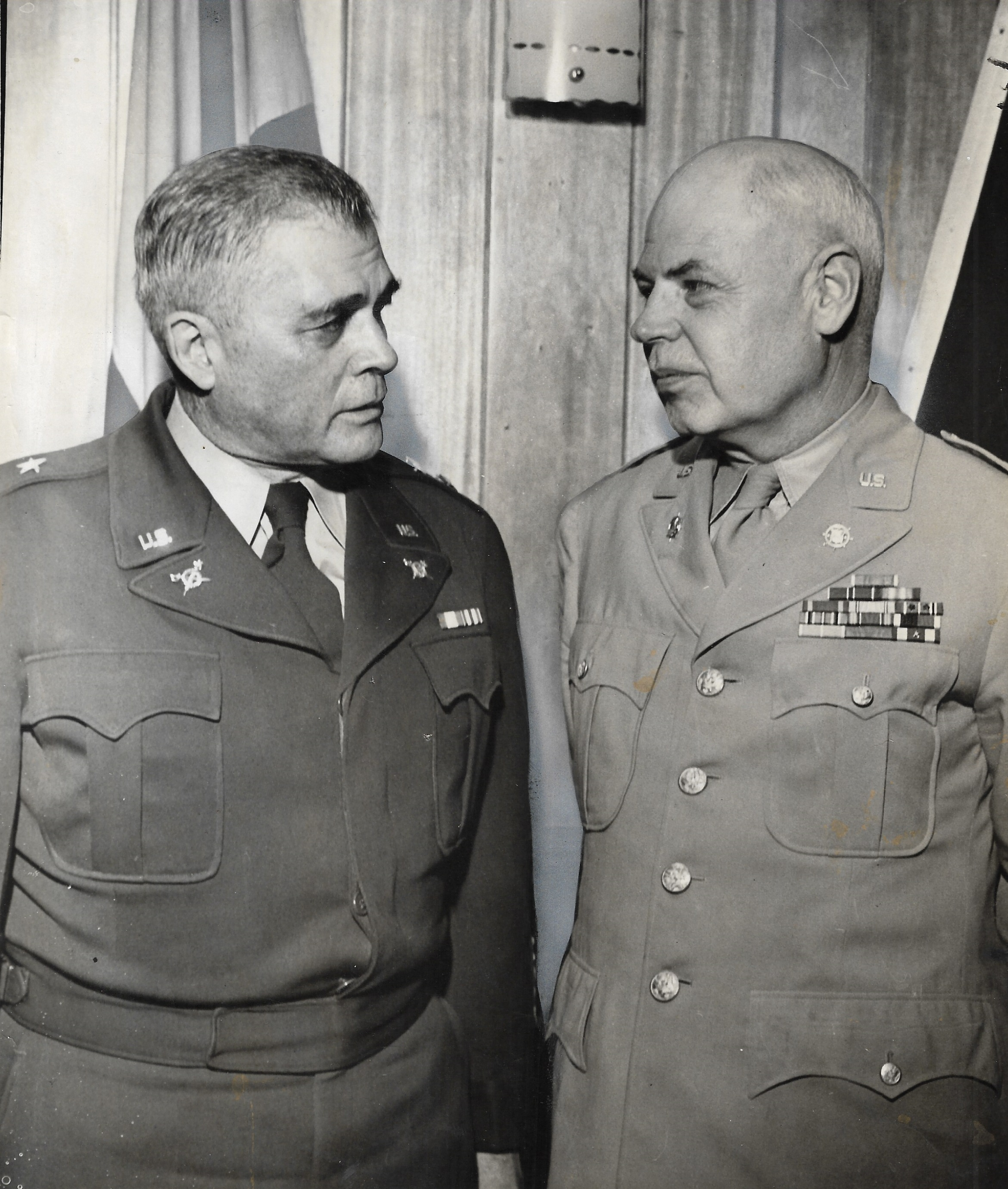
Craig (l) and Colonel Edward Connor (r), 1948

Under his command, the 9th Infantry Division conducted offensive operations in France and Belgium and crossed the Meuse River at Dinant. The 9th Division then penetrated the Siegfried Line near Monschau, then drove to the Rur River between Langerwehe and Düren. During the Battle of the Bulge in December 1944-January 1945, the 9th Infantry Division held the left shoulder of the "Bulge" near Monschau. The division then took part in the drive to capture the Rur Dam, then continued to drive to the Rhine River near Bonn. In March, 1945 Craig commanded all US troops at the Remagen Bridgehead until they resumed the offensive, including the 99th, 78th, and 9th Infantry Divisions. When the 9th Infantry Division resumed its offensive, it continued to the Ruhr Pocket and the Harz Mountains, then made contact with Soviet forces east of the Mulde River at the end of April.

== Post-World War II ==
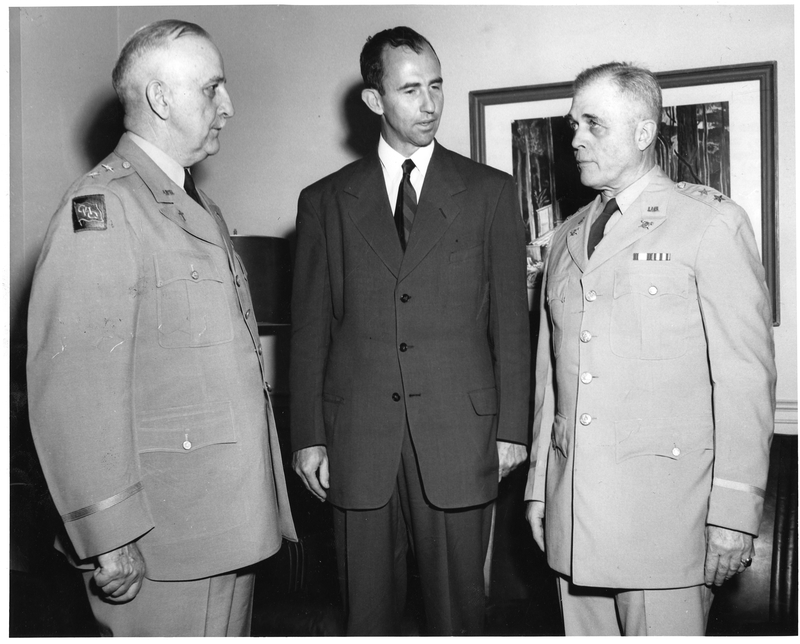
Army Secretary Frank Pace congratulates Generals Roy H. Parker and Louis Craig upon their retirements.

In May, 1945 Craig was named to command the XX Corps in Germany. From June to July, 1945 Craig was commander of Third United States Army. In October he was named to command the Seventh Service Command based in Omaha, Nebraska. In February, 1946 he was assigned to command the Sixth Service Command in Chicago. When Fifth United States Army was activated on June 11, 1946, Craig was appointed as its deputy commander.

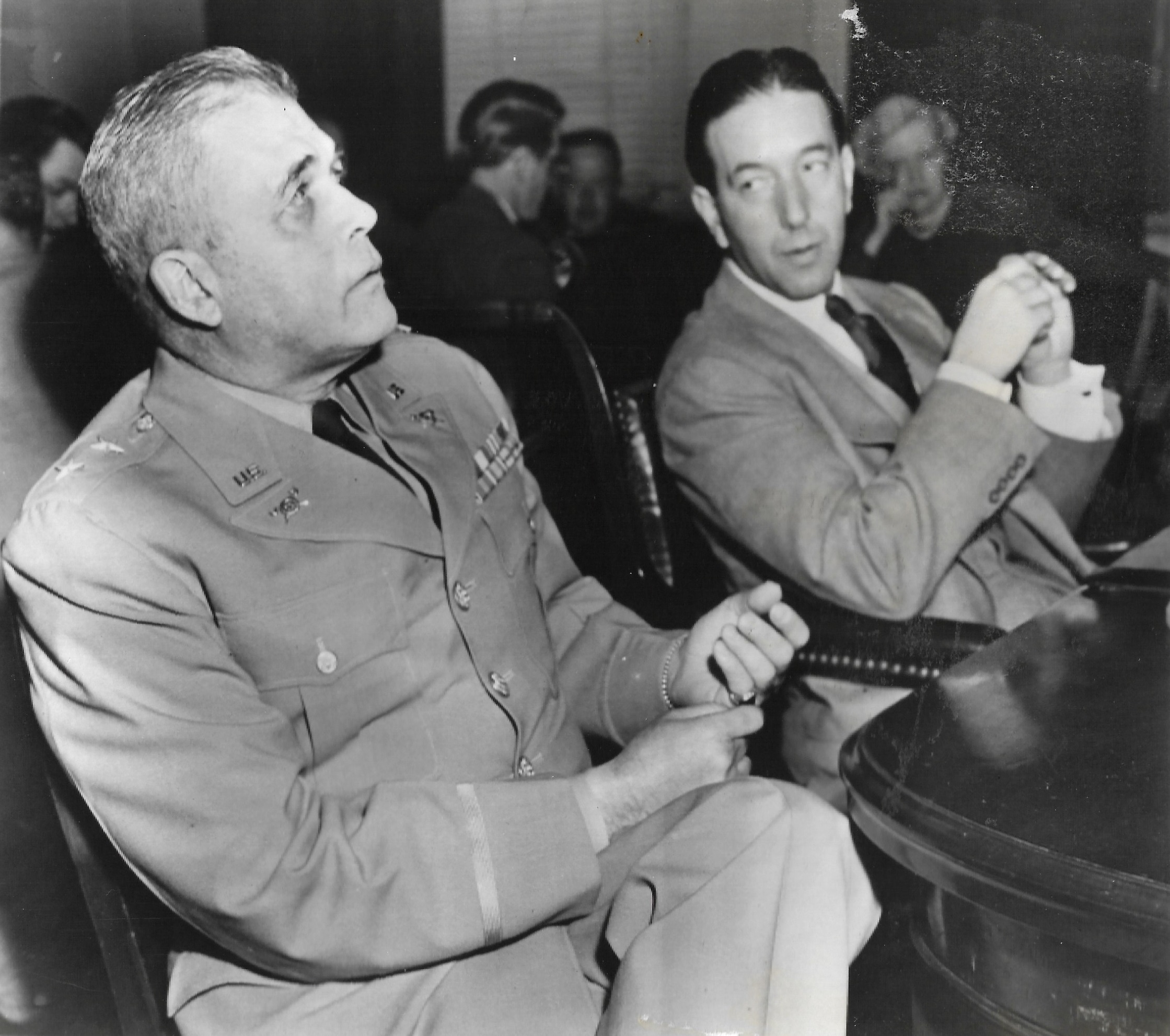
Craig and Assistant Secretary of the Army Karl Bendetsen during Congressional testimony about possible irregularities at the Army's finance center

From August, 1947 to April, 1948 Craig was inspector general of the United States European Command. In April and May 1948, he served as commander of the United States Constabulary in Germany. In July, 1948 Craig was appointed Inspector General of the Army, and he served until retiring in May 1952.

== Awards ==
Craig was a recipient of the Army Distinguished Service Medal for his World War II service. His additional decorations included the Silver Star, the Legion of Merit, and the Bronze Star Medal. Craig's foreign awards for World War I included the Distinguished Service Order (Great Britain), Legion of Honor (Chevalier) (France); Croix de Guerre with palm (France); Croix de Guerre with palm (Belgium); Order of the Crown (Officer) (Belgium), and Order of Abdon Calderón (Ecuador). His World War II foreign awards included the Legion of Honor (Officer) (France); Croix de Guerre with palm (France), Croix de Guerre with Palm (Belgium), Order of the Patriotic War First Class (USSR), and Czechoslovak War Cross.

== Effective dates of promotion ==
Craig's dates of promotion were:

- Second lieutenant, June 12, 1913
- First lieutenant, July 1, 1916
- Captain, May 15, 1917
- Major (temporary), July 3, 1918
- Lieutenant colonel (temporary), November 12, 1918
- Captain, June 30, 1920
- Major, July 1, 1920
- Lieutenant colonel, August 1, 1935
- Colonel (temporary), June 26, 1941
- Brigadier general (temporary), February 16, 1942
- Colonel, July 1, 1942
- Major general (temporary), February 4, 1943
- Brigadier general, October 1, 1946
- Major general, January 24, 1948

== Death and burial ==
Craig died in Washington, D.C., on January 3, 1984. He was buried at Arlington National Cemetery, Section 30, Grave 10651-1-LH.

== Family ==
In 1917, Craig married Miriam Blount (1894–1987). They were the parents of eight children – Louis Aleck; Miriam Malin; Barbara Gwynn; William Blount; Mary Faith; Francis Washington; Constance Anne; and Michael Frederick.

== Sources ==
=== Newspapers ===
- "Mrs. Stout Dies, Sister of Gen. Craig". Plainfield Courier-News. Plainfield, NJ. April 10, 1944 – via Newspapers.com.
- Tingley, Charles O., ed. (April–May 1952). "Maj. Gen. Louis A. Craig Retires After 39 Years Of Military Service" (PDF). The Octofoil. Washington, DC: 9th Infantry Division Association.
- "Deaths Elsewhere: Maj. Gen. Louis A. Craig". The Philadelphia Inquirer. Philadelphia, PA. January 6, 1984 – via Newspapers.com.

=== Books ===
- Cullum, George W. (1920). Robinson, Wirt (ed.). Biographical Register of the Officers and Graduates of the U.S. Military Academy. Vol. VI–B. Saginaw, MI: Seemann & Peters. pp. 1645–1646 – via West Point Digital Library.
- Cullum, George W. (1930). Donaldson, Wm. H. (ed.). Biographical Register of the Officers and Graduates of the U.S. Military Academy. Vol. VII. Chicago, IL, Crawfordsville, IN: R. R. Donnelley & Sons Company, The Lakeside Press – via West Point Digital Library.
- Cullum, George W. (1940). Farman, E. E. (ed.). Biographical Register of the Officers and Graduates of the U.S. Military Academy. Vol. VIII. Chicago, IL, Crawfordsville, IN: R. R. Donnelley & Sons Company, The Lakeside Press – via West Point Digital Library.
- Cullum, George W. (1950). Branham, Charles N. (ed.). Biographical Register of the Officers and Graduates of the U.S. Military Academy. Vol. IX. West Point, NY: The Association of Graduates, U.S. Military Academy – via West Point Digital Library.
- Empric, Bruce E. (2024), Uncommon Allies: U.S. Army Recipients of Soviet Military Decorations in World War II, Teufelsberg Press, ISBN 979-8-3444-6807-5
- Marquis, Albert Nelson (1944). Who's Who in America. Vol. 23. Chicago, IL: A. N. Marquis and Company. p. 452 – via Google Books.

== Internet ==
- "Burial Record, Louis A. Craig". Arlington National Cemetery. Arlington, VA: Office of Army Cemeteries.

Military offices
Preceded by Newly activated organization	Commanding General 97th Infantry Division; 1943–1944	Succeeded by Milton B. Halsey
Preceded by Newly activated organization	Commanding General XXIII Corps; January–July 1944	Succeeded by James I. Muir
Preceded by Manton S. Eddy	Commanding General 9th Infantry Division; 1944–1945	Succeeded by Jesse A. Ladd
Preceded by Walton Walker	Commanding General XX Corps; May–September 1945	Succeeded by Horace L. McBride
Preceded by Withers A. Burress	Commanding General United States Constabulary; April–May 1948	Succeeded by Isaac D. White
Preceded by Ira T. Wyche	Inspector General of the United States Army; 1948–1952	Succeeded by Daniel Noce
