= Mordecai Oliver =

American politician (1819–1898)

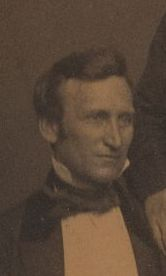
- Oliver in 1856

Missouri secretary of state
- In office 1861–1865
- Governor: Hamilton Rowan Gamble; Willard Preble Hall
- Preceded by: Benjamin Franklin Massey
- Succeeded by: Francis A. Rodman

Member of the U.S. House of Representatives from Missouri's 4th district
- In office March 4, 1853 – March 3, 1857
- Preceded by: Willard P. Hall
- Succeeded by: James Craig

Personal details
- Born: Mordecai Baldwin Oliver; October 22, 1819 Anderson County, Kentucky, US
- Died: April 25, 1898 (aged 78) Springfield, Missouri, US
- Party: Whig
- Occupation: Politician, lawyer

Mordecai Baldwin Oliver (October 22, 1819 – April 25, 1898) was an American politician and lawyer. He was a member of the United States House of Representatives from Missouri.

== Biography ==
Oliver was born on October 22, 1819, in Anderson County, Kentucky. He was educated at common schools, and moved to Missouri in 1832. He studied law, and in 1842, was admitted to the bar, after which he commenced practice in Richmond, Missouri. In 1848, he worked as prosecutor of Missouri's Fifth Judicial Court.

Oliver was a member of the United States House of Representatives from March 4, 1853, to March 3, 1857, representing Missouri's 4th district. He was a Whig during his two terms in Congress. He served on the Howard Committee, alongside William Alanson Howard and John Sherman, in which they investigated Bleeding Kansas. During the American Civil War, he supported the Union, and from 1861 to 1865, was Missouri secretary of state.

Following his political career, Oliver returned to practicing law, now in St. Louis. He was married. He moved to Springfield, and from 1889 to 1893, served as the inaugural judge of Greene County crininal court. He died on April 25, 1898, aged 78, in Springfield. He was buried at Hazelwood Cemetery, in Springfield. He was the father of Ollie C. Oliver, wife of William Preble Hall, thereby connecting Oliver to the Hall political family.

U.S. House of Representatives
Preceded by Willard P. Hall	Member of the U.S. House of Representatives from Missouri's 4th congressional district 1853–1857	Succeeded by James Craig
Political offices
Preceded by Benjamin Franklin Massey	Missouri Secretary of State; 1861–1865	Succeeded by Francis A. Rodman
