= Withers A. Burress =

United States Army general

- Born: November 24, 1894; Richmond, Virginia, United States
- Died: June 13, 1977 (aged 82); Arlington, Virginia, United States
- Relatives: Welborn G. Dolvin (son-in-law)
- Military career
- Allegiance: United States
- Branch: United States Army
- Service years: 1916–1954
- Rank: Lieutenant General
- Nickname: "Pinky"
- Service number: 0-4812
- Unit: Infantry Branch
- Commands: First United States Army; VII Corps; United States Army Infantry School; VI Corps; United States Constabulary; 100th Infantry Division; Virginia Military Institute
- Conflicts: World War I World War II
- Awards: Army Distinguished Service Medal; Silver Star; Legion of Merit; Bronze Star Medal (2)

Lieutenant General Withers Alexander Burress (November 24, 1894 – June 13, 1977) was United States Army officer who was a graduate and commandant of the Virginia Military Institute as well as a combat commander in World War I and World War II.

== Early life and military career ==
Burress was born in Richmond, Virginia, on November 24, 1894, to John Woodfin Burress and Susan Chinn Withers, the latter a collateral descendant of Sir Walter Scott. He attended and graduated from the Virginia Military Institute (VMI) in 1914. On November 30, 1916, he was commissioned a second lieutenant into the Infantry Branch of the United States Army. The American entry into World War I on April 6, 1917, saw him posted to the 23rd Infantry Regiment, which later became part of the newly created 2nd Infantry Division.

Burress saw combat on the Western Front with the regiment as a regimental operations officer, serving in nearly all of the division's major engagements. On November 2, 1919, a year after the war ended on November 11, 1918, he returned to the United States with the permanent rank of captain.

== Between the wars ==
Burress attended the United States Army Infantry School at Fort Benning, Georgia, the United States Army Command and General Staff School at Fort Leavenworth, Kansas, and the United States Army War College at Washington Barracks in Washington, D.C.

From 1935 to 1940, Burress was a professor of military science and served as commandant of the Virginia Military Institute. In 1940, he was assigned to the War Department General Staff in Washington, D.C.

== World War II ==
In 1941, with the United States entrance into World War II, Burress had returned to Fort Benning as Assistant Commandant of the United States Army Infantry School. In early 1942, he was assigned to the Puerto Rican Department. He was given command of the 100th Infantry Division upon its mobilization at Fort Jackson, South Carolina, in November 1942.

Burress continued in his command, taking the division to France in October 1944. As part of the Seventh United States Army's VI Corps, the division went into combat in the Vosges Mountains of northeastern France then through the Rhineland, Ardennes, and Central European campaigns until November 1945, making Burress one of eleven generals to command one of the United States Army's 90 divisions from mobilization to the end of the war. On September 22, 1945, he was promoted to command of the VI Corps then served as Inspector General for European Command (EURCOM).

== Postwar ==
In May 1947, Burress was one of three commanders of the United States Constabulary, the post-war occupation police force in West Germany. In 1949, he returned to EURCOM as its intelligence director, then later took command of VII Corps. He then was the Commandant of the United States Army Infantry School.

In 1952, Burress's final posting was as commander of the First United States Army at Fort Jay at Governors Island in New York City, New York. In November 1954, he retired from the United States Army after 38 years of active duty. That same month, on November 19, 1954, he received a ticker-tape parade down the Canyon of Heroes on Broadway in Manhattan, New York.

Burress died in an Arlington, Virginia nursing home on June 13, 1977, aged 82, and is buried in Arlington National Cemetery.

Military offices
New command	Commanding General 100th Infantry Division; 1942–1945	Succeeded by Andrew C. Tychsen
Preceded by William H. H. Morris Jr.	Commanding General VI Corps; 1945–1946	Post deactivated
Preceded by Ernest N. Harmon	United States Constabulary; 1947–1949	Succeeded by Louis A. Craig
Preceded by John W. O'Daniel	Commandant of the United States Army Infantry School; 1948–1951	Succeeded by John H. Church
New command	Commanding General VII Corps; 1950–1952	Succeeded by James M. Gavin
Preceded by Willis D. Crittenberger	Commanding General First Army; 1953–1954	Succeeded by Thomas W. Herren
