= 100th Training Division =

US Army formation

- 100th Training Division shoulder sleeve insignia
- Active: 23 July 1918–30 November 1919 (National Army); 24 June 1921–10 January 1946 (Organized Reserve); 15 October 1946–12 May 1952 (100th Airborne Div.); 12 May 1952–17 April 1959 (Army Reserve); 17 April 1959–present (100th Training Div.)
- Country: United States
- Branch: United States Army Reserve
- Type: Training
- Size: Division
- Part of: 80th Training Command
- Garrison/HQ: Fort Knox, Kentucky, U.S.
- Nicknames: Century; Sons of Bitche
- Mottos: "Success in Battle" "Soldiers of the Century" "Train 'em Tough!"
- Colors: Blue and red
- Engagements: World War II; Rhineland; Ardennes-Alsace; Central Europe

Commanders
- Current commander: BG Martin C. Jung
- Command Sergeant Major: CSM Christian G. Davis
- Notable commanders: Withers A. Burress; Andrew C. Tychsen; Dillman A. Rush; Frederick M. Warren

Insignia
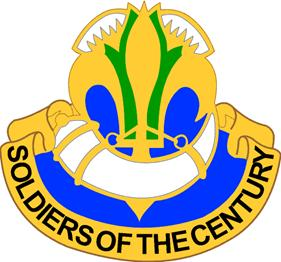
- Distinctive unit insignia

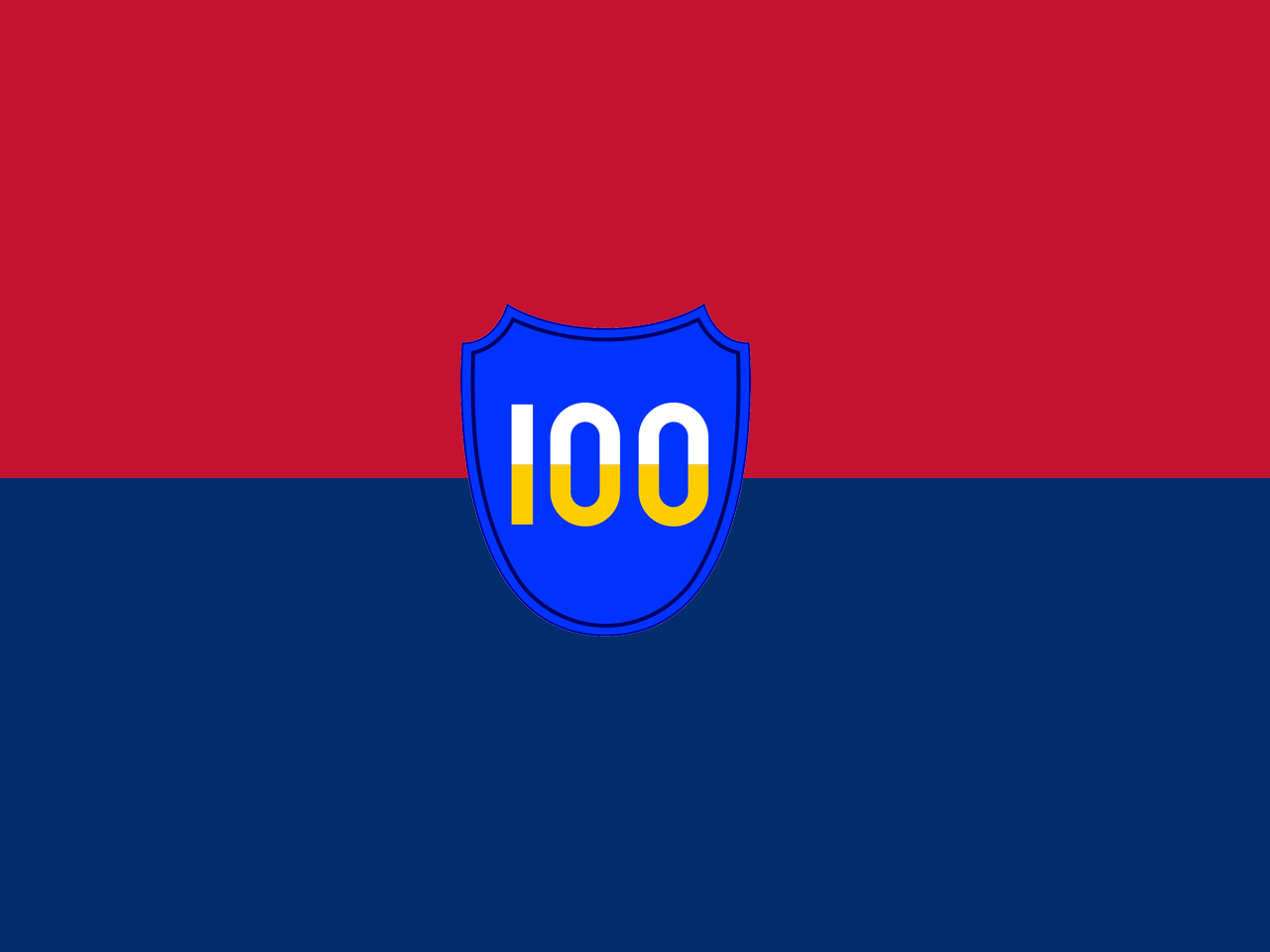
- Flag of the 100th Infantry / Training Division

The 100th Training Division (Leader Development) (formerly the 100th Infantry Division) is a division of the United States Army headquartered at Fort Knox, Kentucky. It currently serves as a major training command of the United States Army Reserve. It has been known as the "Century Division" owing to its "100th" designation.

Throughout its long history, the division has taken on numerous roles. Serving as the 100th Infantry Division until the 1950s, the division then briefly became the 100th Airborne Division before becoming the 100th Division (Training). Since this transformation, the division has primarily taken on numerous training roles for other Army units.

It was originally activated in mid-1918, too late to join the fighting in World War I. The division is best known for its exploits during World War II as the 100th Infantry Division. Fighting in the European Theater, the division advanced through France and Germany through the end of the war, fending off heavy German counterattacks along the way. World War II would be the only war the division would see active combat in before taking on a role as a training unit.

== History ==
=== World War I ===
On 23 July 1918, the War Department directed the organization of the 100th Division at Camp Bowie, Texas. Plans called for the division to include a headquarters, headquarters troop, the 199th Infantry Brigade (397th and 398th Infantry Regiments and 374th Machine Gun Battalion), 200th Infantry Brigade (399th and 400th Infantry Regiments and 375th Machine Gun Battalion), 373rd Machine Gun Battalion, 175th Field Artillery Brigade (373rd-375th Field Artillery Regiments and 25th Trench Mortar Battery), 325th Engineers, 625th Field Signal Battalion, and 325th Train Headquarters and Military Police (Ammunition, Engineer, Sanitary, and Supply Trains). It was intended that the 199th Infantry Brigade would be organized in France from the 56th and 57th Pioneer Infantry Regiments.

The 25th Trench Mortar Battery was formed at Camp Stanley, Texas, in August 1918 and was assigned to the 175th Field Artillery Brigade, but never ended up joining. The organization of the division began in October with the appointment of Colonel William L. Reed as division chief of staff, but organization never progressed beyond the assignment of the division staff and preliminary preparations for the receipt of Selective Service men. After the Armistice of 11 November 1918, the 100th Division was ordered demobilized on 30 November 1918.

=== Interwar period ===
The 100th Division was reconstituted in the Organized Reserve on 24 June 1921, allotted to the Fifth Corps Area, and assigned to the XV Corps. The division was further allotted to the states of West Virginia and Kentucky as its home area. The division headquarters was organized on 27 September 1921 at 209 Greenbriar Street in Charleston, West Virginia, but relocated in April 1922 to 815 Quarrier Street and moved again in September 1922 to the Morrison Building in Charleston. On 29 May 1923, the division received its shoulder sleeve insignia. The headquarters was relocated a final time on 30 June 1928 from 1313 Union Bank and Trust Building in Charleston to the Coal Exchange Building in Huntington, and remained there until activated for World War II. To maintain communications with the officers of the division, the division staff published a newsletter titled “The Century,” which alluded to the division's numerical designation. The newsletter informed the division's members of such things as when and where the inactive training sessions were to be held, what the division's summer training quotas were, when and where the camps were to be held, and which units would be assigned to help conduct the Citizens Military Training Camps (CMTC). As the 1920s gave way to the 1930s and many World War I-experienced Reservists began to retire, the single largest cohort of the division's assigned officers became new ROTC (Reserve Officers' Training Corps) graduates chiefly from West Virginia University in Morgantown, the University of Kentucky in Lexington, or Western Kentucky State Teachers' College in Bowling Green.

The 100th Division headquarters occasionally trained with the staff of the 5th Division's 10th Infantry Brigade at Fort Benjamin Harrison, Indiana. The subordinate infantry regiments of the division held their summer training primarily with the units of the 10th Infantry Brigade at Camp Knox or Fort Thomas, Kentucky, or Fort Benjamin Harrison. Some years, the division's 167th and 168th Infantry Brigades and their subordinate units conducted camp at the Culver Military Academy in Culver, Indiana. Other units, such as the special troops, artillery, engineers, aviation, medical, and quartermaster, trained at various posts in the Fifth Corps Areas, usually with active units of the 5th Division. For example, the division's artillery trained with the 5th Division field artillery units stationed at Camp Knox; the 309th Engineer Regiment usually trained at Fort Benjamin Harrison; the 309th Medical Regiment trained at Camp Knox; and the 309th Observation Squadron trained with the 88th Observation Squadron at Wright Field, Ohio. In addition to the unit training camps, the infantry regiments of the division rotated responsibility for conducting the infantry CMTC training held at Camp Knox and Fort Thomas each year. On a number of occasions, the division participated in Fifth Corps Area and Second Army command post exercises (CPXs) in conjunction with other Regular Army, National Guard, and Organized Reserve units. These training events gave division staff officers’ opportunities to practice the roles they would be expected to perform in the event the division was mobilized. Unlike the Regular and Guard units in the Fifth Corps Area, however, the 100th Division did not participate in the various Fifth Corps Area maneuvers and the Second Army maneuvers of 1936, 1940, and 1941 as an organized unit due to lack of enlisted personnel and equipment. Instead, the officers and a few enlisted reservists were assigned to Regular and Guard units to fill vacant slots and bring the units up to war strength for the exercises. Additionally, some officers were assigned duties as umpires or as support personnel.

=== World War II ===
==== Mobilization ====
Before Organized Reserve infantry divisions were ordered into active military service, they were reorganized on paper as "triangular" divisions under the 1940 tables of organization. The headquarters companies of the two infantry brigades were consolidated into the division's cavalry reconnaissance troop, and one infantry regiment was removed by inactivation. The field artillery brigade headquarters and headquarters battery became the headquarters and headquarters battery of the division artillery. Its three field artillery regiments were reorganized into four battalions; one battalion was taken from each of the two 75 mm gun regiments to form two 105 mm howitzer battalions, the brigade's ammunition train was reorganized as the third 105 mm howitzer battalion, and the 155 mm howitzer battalion was formed from the 155 mm howitzer regiment. The engineer, medical, and quartermaster regiments were reorganized into battalions. In 1942, divisional quartermaster battalions were split into ordnance light maintenance companies and quartermaster companies, and the division's headquarters and military police company, which had previously been a combined unit, was split.

On 15 August 1942, the War Department designated Major General Withers A. Burress as division commander, Colonel Maurice L. Miller as assistant division commander, and Colonel Theodore A. Buechler as division artillery commander. Miller and Buechler were later promoted to brigadier general. The officer cadre (regimental, battalion, and company commanders) was designated by the end of August, and was dispatched to training schools to prepare them for their new assignments. In October 1942, they reported to Fort Jackson, South Carolina, and were joined by about 400 "filler" officers principally obtained from officer candidate schools. In mid-October, the non-commissioned officer cadre, provided principally by the 76th Infantry Division arrived at Fort Jackson. The 100th Infantry Division was officially ordered into active military service on 15 November 1942. Over 13,000 enlisted fillers, consisting of men from all across the United States, "salesmen from New York; farmers from the Carolinas, Georgia, and Alabama; mechanics from New Jersey; clerks from the New England states; mill workers from Pennsylvania and Delaware," arrived in short order thereafter. Basic training began on 28 December 1942.

==== Division organization ====
The division consisted of the following units:

100th Infantry Division organization (click to enlarge)

- 100th Infantry Division
  - 100th Infantry Division Headquarters
  - 100th Cavalry Reconnaissance Troop (Mechanized) (M3 scout cars and then M8 Greyhound armored cars)
  - 397th Infantry Regiment
    - Headquarters and Headquarters Company
    - 3× Infantry battalions
      - each battalion consists of: 1× Headquarters and Headquarters Company, 3× Rifle companies, 1× Heavy Weapons Company
    - Cannon Company (T12 Gun Motor Carriages and T19 Howitzer Motor Carriages, later replaced by either M3 105mm towed howitzers or M7 Priest self propelled howitzers)
    - Anti-Tank Company (M3 37mm anti-tank guns, which were replaced by 1944 with M1 57mm anti-tank guns)
    - Service Company
  - 398th Infantry Regiment
    - same organization as 397th Infantry Regiment
  - 399th Infantry Regiment
    - same organization as 397th Infantry Regiment
  - 100th Infantry Division Artillery
    - Headquarters and Headquarters Battery
    - 373rd Field Artillery Battalion
      - Headquarters and Headquarters Battery
      - 3× Batteries (M1 155mm towed howitzers)
      - Service Battery
    - 374th Field Artillery Battalion
      - Headquarters and Headquarters Battery
      - 3× Batteries (M2 105mm towed howitzers)
      - Service Battery
    - 375th Field Artillery Battalion
      - same organization as 374th Field Artillery Battalion
    - 925th Field Artillery Battalion
      - same organization as 374th Field Artillery Battalion
  - Headquarters Special Troops
    - Headquarters Company, 100th Infantry Division
    - 100th Signal Company
    - 100th Quartermaster Company
    - 800th Ordnance Light Maintenance Company
    - Military Police Platoon
    - 100th Infantry Division Band (attached)
  - 325th Engineer Combat Battalion
    - Headquarters and Headquarters and Service Company
    - 3× Engineer combat companies
  - 325th Medical Battalion
    - Headquarters and Headquarters Detachment
    - 3× Collecting companies
    - Clearing Company

==== Training ====
From late 1943 to early 1944, the division trained in the mountains of Tennessee and was subsequently sent to Fort Bragg, North Carolina, for further training. While at Fort Bragg, Technical Sergeant Walter L. Bull earned the first Expert Infantryman's Badge.

Between January 1943 and August 1944, the division sent 14,636 enlisted men and 1,400 officers as cadres or fillers for other units or to overseas replacement depots. The latter transfers were to obey two War Department directives issued in January and February 1944. The first was that the greatest possible proportion of men sent overseas as replacements have at least six months of training. The latter was to prohibit 18 year olds and men with children conceived prior to Pearl Harbor who had less than six months of training from being sent overseas as replacements unless men could be found from other sources. In June 1944, the age rule became even stricter, with no men under 19 shipped as replacements in infantry or armor under any circumstances, and no men under 18 years and 6 months assigned to infantry or armor replacement training centers.

Between April 1944 ("when the initial age rules began to have a substantial effect") and September 1944 (when the age policy came to an end), the 100th Infantry Division lost 125 infantry noncommissioned officers and 3,859 privates. In exchange, the division received men from replacement training centers (particularly starting in the summer, when demand for replacements in all theaters became so high that the centers, rather than units, again became the primary source of overseas replacements), the pared-down Army Specialized Training Program, aviation cadets returned to the ground forces, men from disbanded units in other branches of the Army (principally antiaircraft and tank destroyer), and men who had volunteered for the infantry from other branches of the Army.

The division sailed to Europe on 6 October of that year. The division arrived at Marseille, France, on 20 October. It was made part of VI Corps of the Seventh United States Army, Sixth United States Army Group.

==== Combat chronicle ====
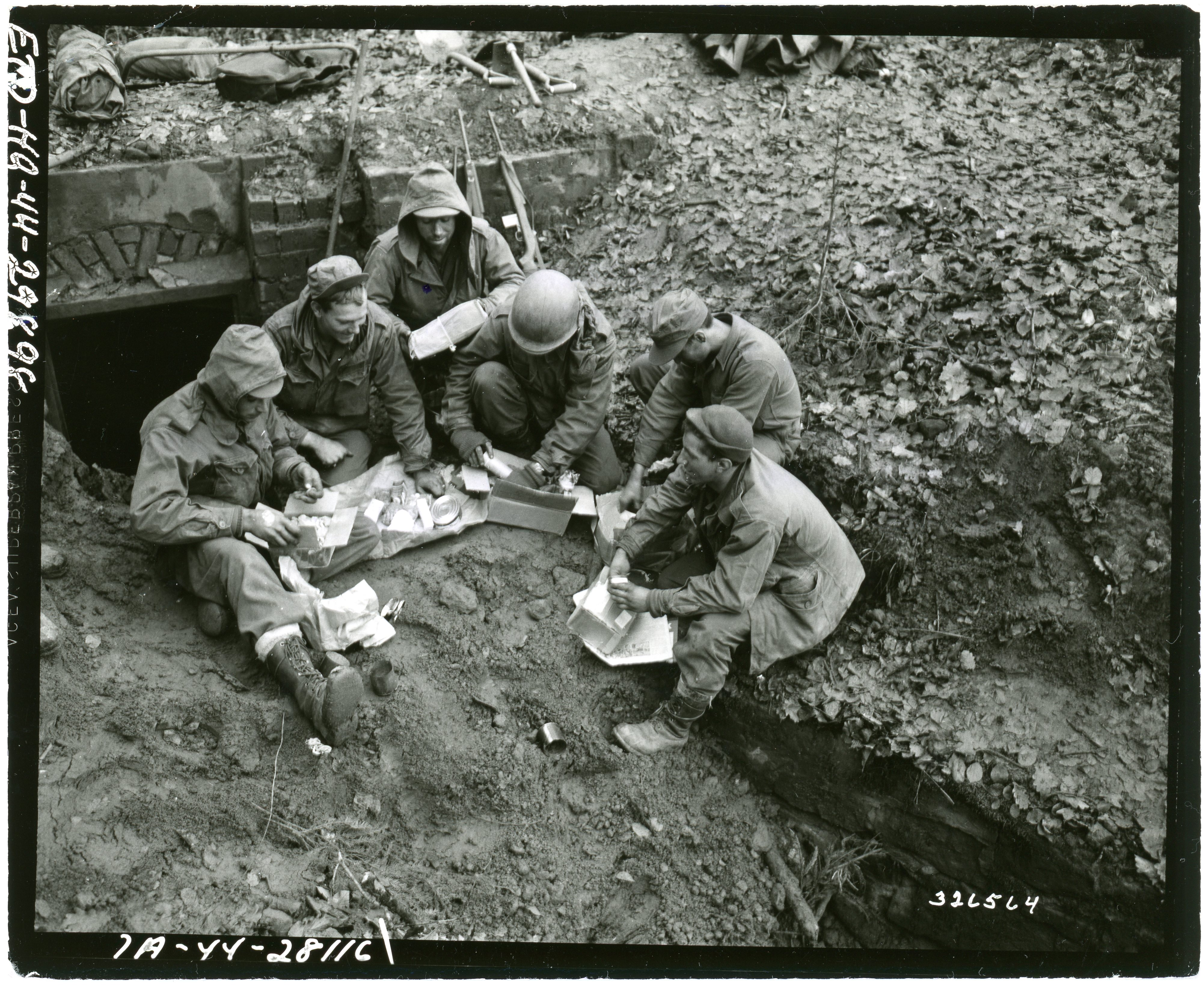
Infantrymen of Company C, 2nd Bn., 398th Regt., 100th Div., open Christmas boxes while they are waiting for orders to attack the Maginot line. Bitche area, France.

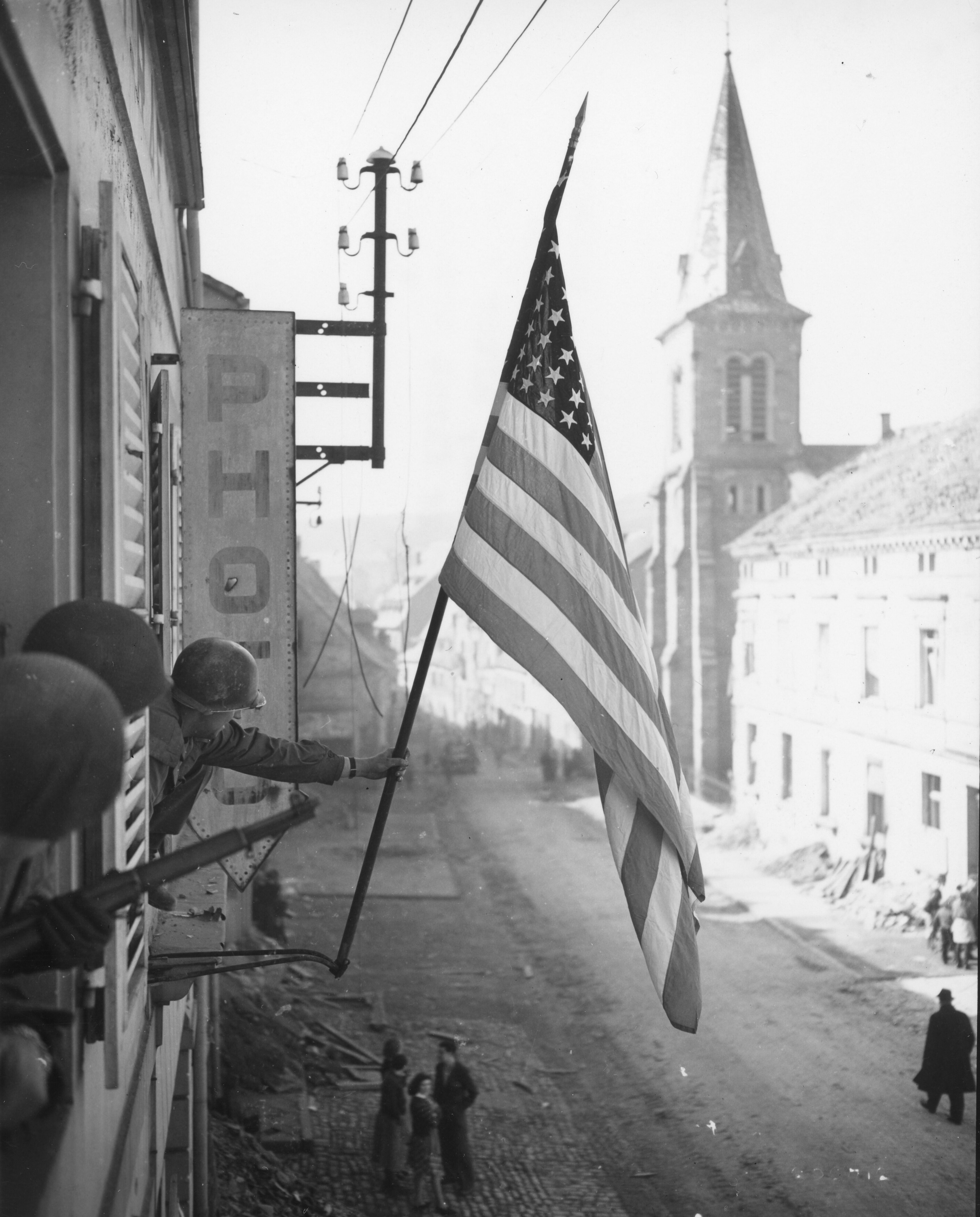
Capt. Thomas H. Garahan, Brooklyn, New York, raises American flag as Bitche, France, falls to the 100th Infantry Division.

As soon as the division was prepared for combat, it began moving into the Meurthe-et-Moselle region, and sent its first elements into combat at St. Remy in the Vosges Mountains on 1 November 1944. The division as a whole began the relief of the 45th Infantry Division at Baccarat on 5 November, and assumed control of the sector on 9 November. The attack jumped off on 12 November, and the division drove against the German Winter Line in the Vosges Mountains. The 100th took Bertrichamps and Clairupt, pierced the German line, and seized Raon-l'Étape and Saint-Blaise-Moyenmoutier between 16 and 26 November. Later in November the division moved into the Vosges region, elements assisted in holding the Saverne Gap bridgehead while the bulk of the division went into reserve. The unit was relieved from assignment to VI Corps and transferred to the US XV Corps on 27 November 1944. It then moved into the Moselle region.

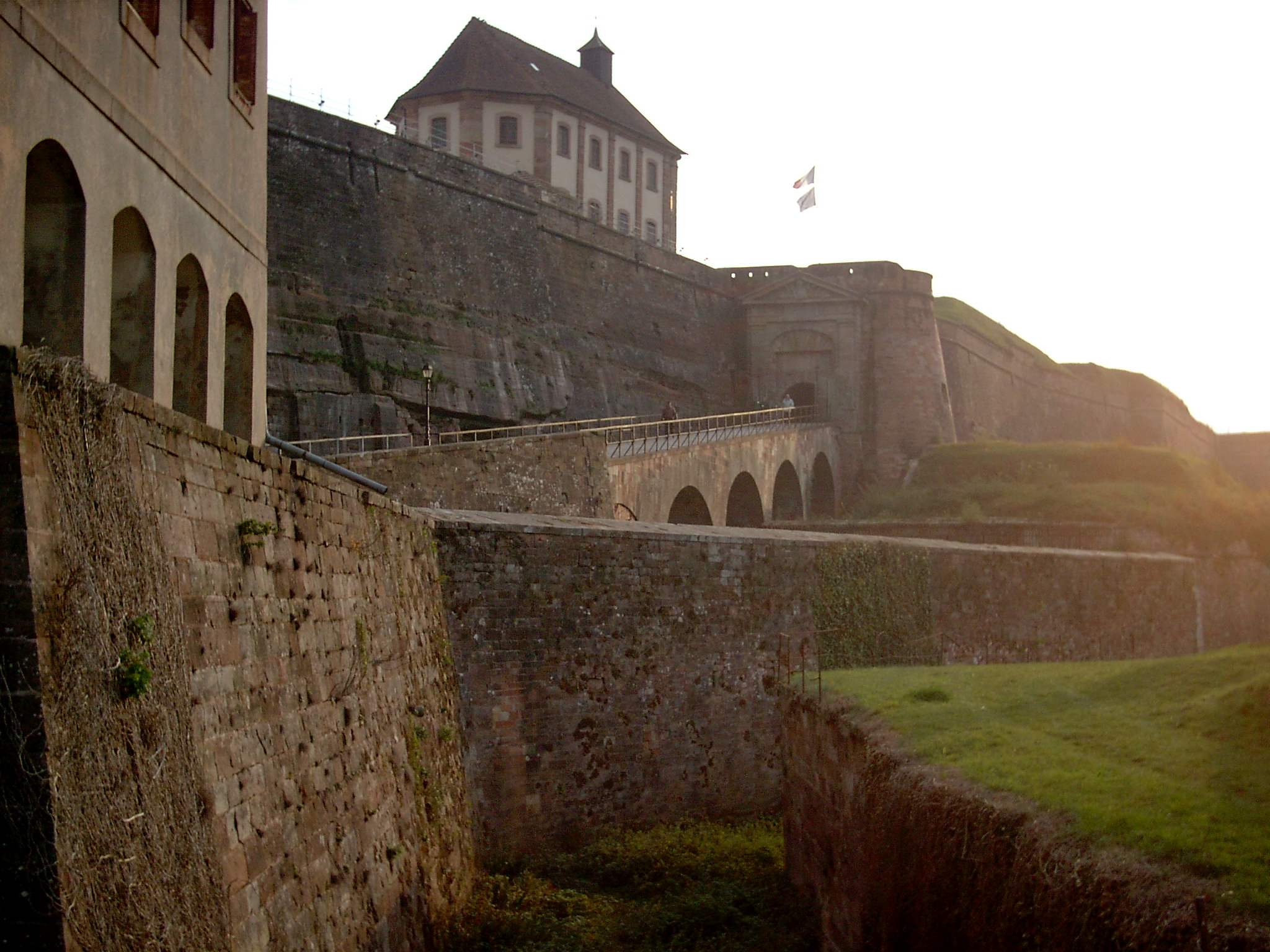
The citadel of Bitche, France

In December 1944, the division went on the offensive in the vicinity of Bitche, France. The division occupied the nearby areas of Wingen and Lemberg after fierce fighting on 6–10 December. The division then advanced to Reyersviller, which fell after fighting on 11–13 December. On 14 December, regiments from the 100th started their assault on a minor fortification Freundenburg and Fort Schiesseck, a major defensive work in the region. Fort Freundenburg was captured on 17 December by the 100th division's 398th Infantry Regiment. Fort Schiesseck capitulated after three more days of heavy assault by the 100th on 20 December. The division was ordered to halt its attack and to hold defensive positions south of Bitche as part of the Seventh Army during the Battle of the Bulge. Thanks to a stout defense, the men of the 100th later became known as the "Sons of Bitche". The German counterattacks of 1 and 8–10 January 1945 were repulsed, after heavy fighting at Bitche. After further attacks stalled and the Germans began to withdraw, the sector was generally quiet and the division prepared to resume its offensive east.

On 15 March 1945, the attack jumped off and on 16 March, Bitche fell to the 100th Infantry Division. The unit was then relieved from assignment to XV Corps, and transferred to XXI Corps on 22 March 1945. Taking Neustadt and Ludwigshafen, the division reached the Rhine River on 24 March. On 25 March 1945, the unit was returned from XXI Corps back to VI Corps. On 31 March 1945, the 100th Infantry Division crossed the Rhine and moved south in the wake of the 10th Armored Division and then east across the Neckar River, establishing and enlarging a bridgehead from 4 to 11 April. Heilbronn fell after nine days of house-to-house combat on 12 April and the division resumed its rapid pursuit of the enemy, reaching Stuttgart by 21 April. The 100th was mopping up along the Neckar, southeast of Stuttgart on 23 April, when it was removed from VI Corps and assigned directly to the Seventh United States Army as an Echelon Above Corps Asset. The division was then assigned primarily to patrolling the sector east of Stuttgart. Shifting to Göppingen on 30 April, the Division engaged in occupational duties as the war in Europe came to an end on V-E Day. The division had spent 163 days in combat.

The division took 13,351 enemy prisoners of war on its own. Members of the division won three Medals of Honor, seven Distinguished Service Crosses, five Legions of Merit, 492 Silver Star Medals, 23 Soldier's Medals, 5,156 Bronze Star Medals, and 90 Air Medals. The division itself was awarded three campaign streamers for participation in the campaign.

100th Infantry Division returned to the United States via the Hampton Roads Port of Embarkation on 10 January 1946, and was released from active duty at Camp Patrick Henry, Virginia that day. The division then began the process of demobilization, before inactivating on 26 January.

==== Casualties ====
- Total battle casualties: 5,038
- Killed in action: 883
- Wounded in action: 3,539
- Missing in action: 483
- Prisoner of war: 491

=== Cold War ===
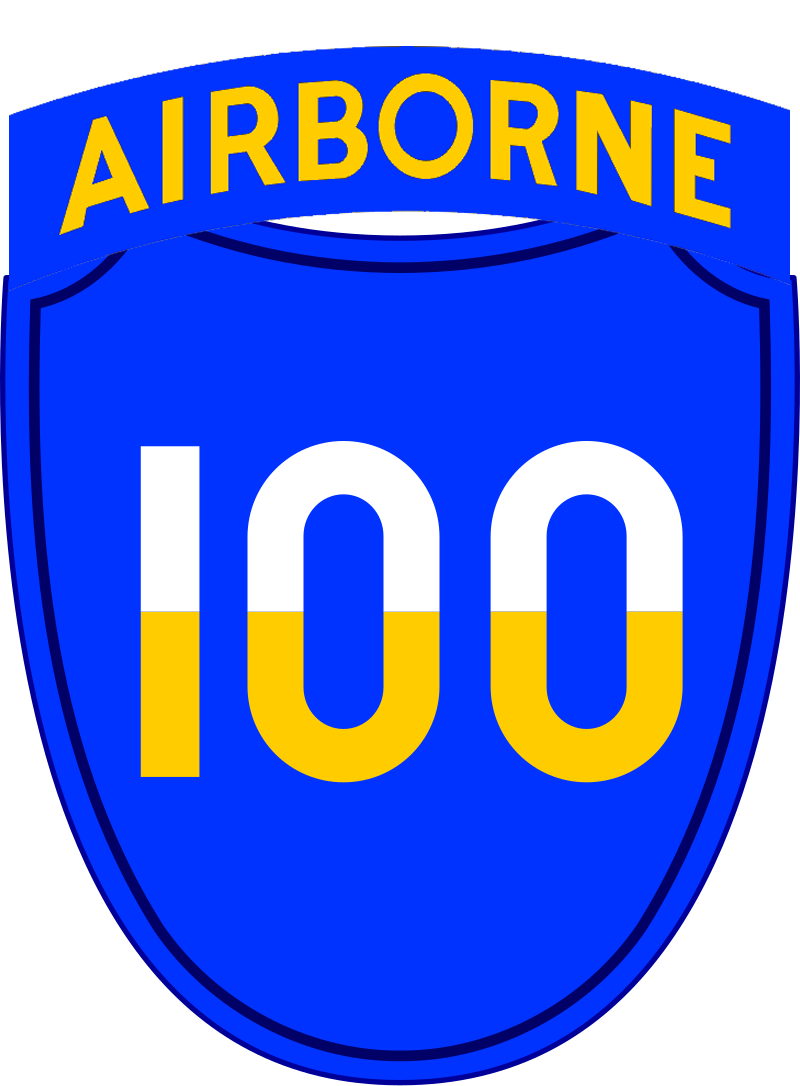
100th Airborne Division

In fall of 1946, the division was reactivated in the U.S. Army Reserve as the 100th Airborne Division in Louisville, Kentucky. It was assigned to Second United States Army. This distinction as one of the few airborne divisions within the U.S. Army was brief; in 1952 the division was once again redesignated the 100th Infantry Division. In 1955, it became the 100th Division (Replacement Training). In 1959 it became the 100th Division (Institutional Training). Its mission became to teach basic, advanced, and common training skills to soldiers from the active Army; the Army Reserve; and the Army National Guard.

In 1961, some 1,500 soldiers from the 100th were activated and sent to Fort Chaffee, Arkansas, in order to provide support during the Berlin Crisis. During their time on active duty, the 100th successfully trained some 32,000 soldiers after thoroughly rebuilding and fixing the old Army base. The unit was returned to reserve status again in August 1962. The division was transferred to First United States Army on 1 January 1966. In 1968, the division received its distinctive unit insignia, which alluded to its history in World War II and as a Kentucky-based unit.

With the implementation of the Reorganization Objective Army Division TOE in 1968, the division ceased to be centered on regiments and instead was reorganized with brigades. However, with the 199th Infantry Brigade active as a separate brigade, the division's new brigades were activated from units that had been under its command in World War II. The division's headquarters element (which had since been replaced by a Headquarters and Headquarters Company) was redesignated the 1st Brigade, 100th Division responsible for basic armor school training. The 928th Field Artillery Battalion became the 2nd Brigade, 100th Division responsible for armored cavalry unit training. The 325th Engineer Battalion became the 3rd Brigade, 100th Division responsible for combat support training, and the 800th Ordnance Battalion became the 4th Brigade, 100th Division, responsible for combat service support training.

In 1977 the divisional mission changed from basic combat and advanced individual armor training to One Station Unit Training. The division had to prepare for mobilization to conduct entry level armor or armoured reconnaissance training for enlistees in one station format. The next year, the division the first Army Reserve formation to be equipped with its own squadrons of M1 Abrams tanks. With the arrival of the M3 Bradley infantry fighting vehicles, the division's mission profile changed from individual combat training to armor and armor reconnaissance training. By 1986, it was the largest reserve unit within the state of Kentucky, commanding fifty-eight percent of instate reservists.

=== Gulf War ===
At the outbreak of Operation Desert Storm in 1991, the 100th was assigned to armor training at Fort Knox, Kentucky for deploying armor units. Armor training was a responsibility that the division continued after the war.

In 1995 the division was reorganized to include Army Reserve schools, taking over the responsibilities for new programs. In 1996 the 100th Division's 1st Brigade worked with Readiness Group Knox to pioneer the national training experiment to reserve combat units at crew and platoon levels. Later that year, the division added three additional divisional brigades; the 5th Brigade, 100th Division in Memphis, Tennessee for health services training, the 6th Brigade, 100th Division in Louisville, Kentucky for professional development training, and the 7th Brigade, 100th Division at Fort Knox, formed from the 100th Training Command and responsible for training exercises. The 5th Brigade moved to Millington, Tennessee in 1997, and the 7th Brigade inactivated in 2000. The 8th Brigade, 100th Division was also activated as a unit overseeing ROTC training.

=== Recent events ===
During 1997, the division was tasked with partial responsibility for Operation Future Challenge at Fort Knox, a six-week Reserve Officer's Training Corps Basic Camp during each summer. By 2000, the 100th has assumed full responsibility for running the camp. Later that same year, the 100th began inactivating many of its M1A1 Abrams tanks as part of a reduction in military expenditures.

After the September 11 attacks, the 100th Division began preparing Army National Guard units from Ohio and Kentucky as they prepared for deployment to the War in Afghanistan (2001-2021) and, possibly, the Iraq War (U.S. phase, 2003–2011).

By 2006, the division had moved its headquarters from Louisville to Fort Knox, easing distance strains in administration and training. The division was restructured, eliminating all but four of its brigades. The division shifted its focus from initial entry training to providing military occupational specialty and non-commissioned officer training for four army career fields across the United States. The 100th Division (Operational Support) teaches soldiers subjects from military intelligence, signal corps, civil affairs/psychological operations and health services.

On 1 October 2018 the 100th Training Division was redesignated as the 100th Training Division (Leader Development). The 100th Training Division (Leader Development) establishes and implements the Army Reserve Leader Development Strategy to provide a continuum of career education, training, and experience for leaders in the Army Reserve. During this reorganization, the 83rd USARRTC and the 97th (CGSOC) Brigade were placed under the 100th Training Division.

== Organization ==
The 100th Training Division (Operational Support) is a subordinate unit of the 80th Training Command (The Army School System — TASS). As of January 2026 the division consists of the following units:

- 100th Training Division (Operational Support), at Fort Knox (KY)
  - 83rd United States Army Reserve Readiness Training Center (83rd USARRTC), at Fort Knox (KY)
    - Readiness Training Academy, at Fort Knox (KY)
    - NCO Academy Camp Parks, at Camp Parks (CA)
    - NCO Academy Fort Dix, at Joint Base McGuire–Dix–Lakehurst (NJ)
    - NCO Academy Fort McCoy, at Fort McCoy (WI)
  - 97th Training Brigade (Command and General Staff Officers' Course — CGSOC), at Fort Sheridan (IL)
    - 10th Battalion, 80th Regiment (Command and General Staff Officers' Course — CGSOC), in Owings Mills (MD)
      - Detachment 1, 10th Battalion, 80th Regiment (Command and General Staff Officers' Course — CGSOC), in Schenectady (NY)
    - 11th Battalion, 95th Regiment (Command and General Staff Officers' Course — CGSOC), in Kansas City (MO)
      - Detachment 1, 11th Battalion, 95th Regiment (Command and General Staff Officers' Course — CGSOC), in Lexington (KY)
    - 11th Battalion, 108th Regiment (Command and General Staff Officers' Course — CGSOC), in Concord (NC)
      - Detachment 1, 11th Battalion, 108th Regiment (Command and General Staff Officers' Course — CGSOC), in Columbus (OH)

== Honors ==
=== Campaign participation credit ===
Conflict	Streamer	Year(s)
World War II	Rhineland	1944–1945
World War II	Ardennes-Alsace Battle Credit	1944–1945
World War II	Central Europe	1945

=== Presidential Unit Citation ===
Unit	Year the PUC was awarded	Campaign	Streamer inscription
1st Battalion, 397th Infantry Regiment	1946	Central Europe	HEILBRONN
2nd Battalion, 397th Infantry Regiment	1946	Central Europe	HEILBRONN
H Company, 397th Infantry Regiment	1946	Ardennes-Alsace	RIMLING
3rd Battalion, 397th Infantry Regiment	1951	Ardennes-Alsace	RIMLING
3rd Battalion, 398th Infantry Regiment	1945		BITCHE
3rd Battalion, 398th Infantry Regiment	1946	Central Europe	HEILBRONN
1st Battalion, 399th Infantry Regiment	1946		RAON-L'ÉTAPE
3rd Battalion, 399th Infantry Regiment	1952	Central Europe	BEILSTEIN

== Legacy ==
The division's legacy in World War II has been honored several times. The Cross Island Parkway in Queens, New York was renamed the "100th Infantry Division Parkway" in 2005 in honor of 2,300 soldiers from New York that served with the division during the war. Three soldiers earned the Medal of Honor serving with the division in World War II. They were Edward A. Silk, Mike Colalillo, and Charles F. Carey Jr.

== Sources ==
- McGrath, John J. (2004). The Brigade: A History: Its Organization and Employment in the US Army. Combat Studies Institute Press. ISBN 978-1-4404-4915-4.
- Army Almanac: A Book of Facts Concerning the Army of the United States. United States Government Printing Office. 1959. ASIN B0006D8NKK.
- Order of Battle of the United States Army: World War II European Theater of Operations. Department of the Army. 1988 [1st pub. 1945]. ISBN 978-0-16-001967-8.
