= James Craig (Missouri soldier) =

American lawyer and politician (1818–1888)

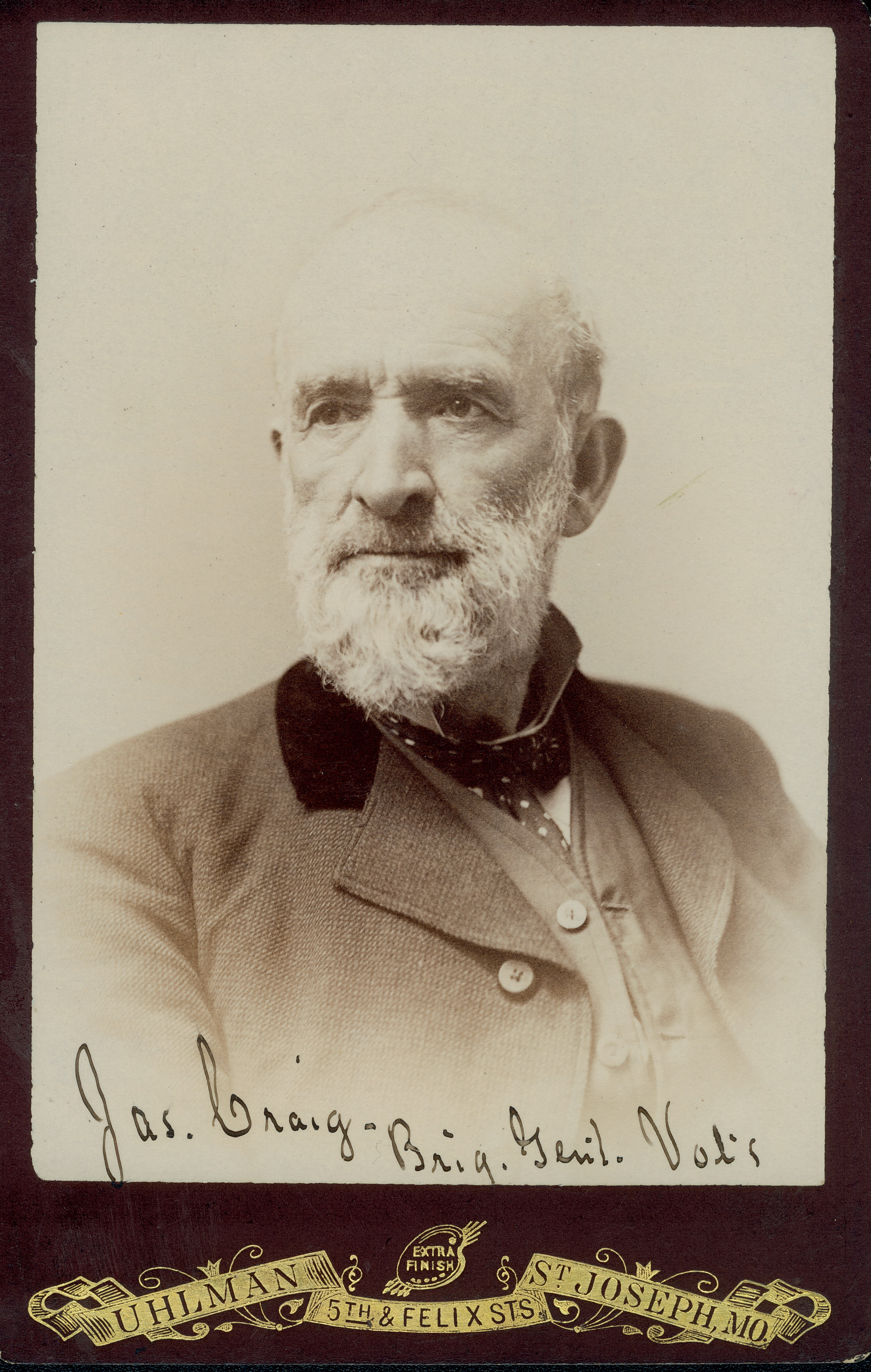

Member of the U.S. House of Representatives from Missouri's 4th district
- In office March 4, 1857 – March 3, 1861
- Preceded by: Mordecai Oliver
- Succeeded by: Elijah Hise Norton

Circuit Attorney of Missouri's 12th Judicial Circuit
- In office 1852–1856
- Preceded by: Samuel Archer
- Succeeded by: James M. Bassett

Member of the Missouri House of Representatives
- In office 1846–1848
- Preceded by: Stephen Cooper
- Succeeded by: James Foster
- Constituency: Holt County

Personal details
- Born: February 28, 1818 Washington County, Pennsylvania, U.S.
- Died: October 12, 1888 (aged 70) St. Joseph, Missouri, U.S.
- Party: Democratic
- Spouse: Helen Pfouts (m. 1843)
- Relations: Malin Craig (grandson); Louis A. Craig (grandson)
- Children: 6
- Profession: Attorney

Military service
- Allegiance: United States; Union
- Service: Missouri Militia; Union Army
- Years of service: 1847–1849, 1863–1865 (Militia); 1861–1863 (Army)
- Rank: Brigadier General (Militia); Brigadier General (Army)
- Commands: Northwestern Department of Missouri (Militia); Department of the Platte (Army)
- Wars: Mexican–American War; American Civil War

James Craig (February 28, 1818 – October 22, 1888) was an American lawyer and politician from Saint Joseph, Missouri. He represented Missouri in the U.S. House from 1857 until 1861. He also served as a militia captain in the Mexican–American War.

During the American Civil War, Craig served as a brigadier general of U.S. volunteers. From April to November 1862, Craig was the military commander in charge of the overland mail routes in Kansas and Nebraska. On November 2, 1862 he assumed command of the District of Nebraska Territory and commanded until May 5, 1863 when he resigned. Craig again served as a brigadier general, this time in the Missouri State militia, in 1864 and 1865.

== Biography ==
Craig was born in Washington County, Pennsylvania on February 28, 1818, the son of tailor James Craig and Margaret Slater (Sleator) Craig. (Note: Some sources indicate Craig's year of birth was 1817 or 1820.) He was two years old when his family relocated to Richland County, Ohio, where Craig was raised and educated. At age 22, Craig began to study law in the Canton, Ohio office of Harris and Brown. After attaining admission to the bar, he practiced briefly in New Philadelphia, Ohio. In 1844, he relocated to Oregon, Missouri, where he continued to practice law.

A Democrat, in 1846, Craig was elected to represent Holt County, Missouri in the Missouri House of Representatives and he served one term. During the Mexican–American War, he organized a company of the Missouri Militia's Oregon Battalion which he commanded as a captain as it provided protection for wagon trains of migrants and supplies in western Missouri, Kansas, and other western states. In 1849, he traveled west to take part in the California gold rush. In 1850, he returned to Missouri and settled in St. Joseph, where he practiced law in partnership with Lawrence Archer.

In 1851, Craig was elected circuit attorney of the 12th judicial circuit, and he served two terms. A supporter of the Union during the American Civil War, in 1861 he was commissioned as a brigadier general of United States Volunteers and assigned to command the Union Army's Department of the Platte, where he was directed to maintain federal relationships with the Pawnee and Sioux in Kansas, Nebraska and other nearby states. He resigned in 1863, and was soon appointed a brigadier general of the Missouri Militia and appointed to command the Northwestern Department, with headquarters in St. Joseph. In this command, he was responsible for curtailing the activities of pro-Confederate bushwhackers. Craig served until the end of the war, and resigned in 1865.

In addition to practicing law, Craig was active in railroads and other business ventures, including serving as president of the Hannibal and St. Joseph Railroad. Craig died in St. Joseph on October 21, 1888. He was buried at Mount Mora Cemetery in St. Joseph. He was the namesake of Craig, Missouri.

== Family ==
In August 1843, Craig married Helen Pfouts of Wayne County, Ohio. They were the parents of six children, James, Benjamin, Louis, Willard, Ida, and Clara. Louis A. Craig Sr. was a career army officer who attained the rank of colonel and was the father of army generals Malin Craig and Louis A. Craig.

== Notes ==
U.S. House of Representatives
Preceded by Mordecai Oliver	Member of the U.S. House of Representatives from Missouri's 4th congressional district 1857–1861	Succeeded by Elijah Hise Norton
