= Andrew C. Tychsen =

United States Army general

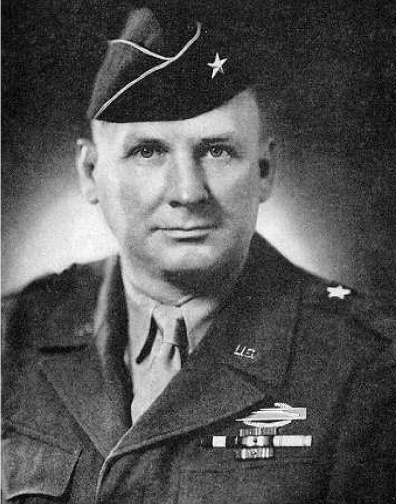
- Born: June 27, 1893; Hoboken, New Jersey, US
- Died: July 3, 1986 (aged 93); Richland County, South Carolina, US
- Military career
- Allegiance: United States
- Branch: United States Army
- Service years: 1914–1953
- Rank: Brigadier General
- Commands: 100th Infantry Division
- Conflicts: Pancho Villa Expedition; World War I; World War II; Korean War
- Awards: Army Distinguished Service Medal; Legion of Merit (2); Bronze Star Medal (2)

Andrew Christian Tychsen (June 27, 1893 – July 3, 1986) was a United States Army brigadier general. He served in World War I as a company commander and by the end of World War II, was commanding the 100th Infantry Division. Later, during the Korean War, he served as Chief of Staff of the IX Corps. He retired from the army in 1953.

== Early years ==
Tychsen was born on June 27, 1893, in Hoboken, New Jersey. During World War I, Tychsen enlisted as a private in the Minnesota National Guard in April 1914 and was assigned to Company A of the 1st Infantry. In this capacity, Tychsen served on Mexican border during the Pancho Villa Expedition. He rose to the rank of first sergeant and was posted to the First Reserve Officers Training Camp at Fort Snelling on March 25, 1917.

In August 1917, Tychsen was sent to France with the 88th Infantry Division and participated in the fighting near Belfort and Epinal. Tychsen was promoted to the rank of captain and Commanding Officer of Company C, 339th Machine Gun Battalion.

After his return to the States in 1919, Tychsen was commissioned as a captain in the Regular army and attended the United States Army Infantry School at Fort Benning in 1921. During 1921–1925, he served as Assistant Professor of Military Science and Tactics at University of Minnesota. Subsequently, he served as Professor of Military Science and Tactics at St. Thomas Military Academy until 1932, when he was transferred to Hawaii, where he served at Schofield Barracks with the 27th Infantry Regiment. On August 1, 1935, Tychsen was promoted to the rank of major and was detached to the Command and General Staff School at Fort Leavenworth, Kansas. He graduated there a year later and then was transferred to Jefferson Barracks in Missouri, where he served with the 6th Infantry Regiment. In 1938, Tychsen was transferred to the Camden, New Jersey, where he was appointed as an Executive officer of the Camden Military District. In this capacity, he was in command of Organized Reserves.

== World War II ==
Tychsen spent some time as a battalion commander of the 1st Infantry Replacement Group, before took command of 399th Infantry Regiment, 100th Infantry Division. He participated in the Battle of the Bulge, Rhineland Campaign and Central European Campaign. At the beginning of January 1945, Tychsen was appointed assistant division commander of the 100th Infantry Division, succeeding Brigadier General John S. Winn Jr. He was promoted to the rank of brigadier general on April 12, 1945. On August 22, Tychsen succeeded Major General Withers A. Burress as division commander and served with the division until the end of January 1946, when the division was inactivated.

== Retirement ==
During the Korean War, Tychsen was served as Chief of Staff of the IX Corps, under command of Major General John B. Coulter.

Brigadier General Tychsen retired from the Army on June 30, 1953.

After retirement, he served on the United Nations Rehabilitation Commission for Korea and finally retired in 1958.

Brigadier General Andrew Christian Tychsen died at the age of 93 on July 3, 1986. He is buried at Arlington National Cemetery.

== Decorations ==
Combat Infantryman Badge

Army Distinguished Service Medal
Legion of Merit with Oak Leaf Cluster
Bronze Star Medal with Oak Leaf Cluster
Air Medal
Mexican Border Service Medal
World War I Victory Medal with one Battle Clasp
American Defense Service Medal
American Campaign Medal
European-African-Middle Eastern Campaign Medal with 3 service stars
World War II Victory Medal
Army of Occupation Medal
National Defense Service Medal
Korean Service Medal
United Nations Korea Medal

Military offices
Preceded by Withers A. Burress	Commanding General 100th Infantry Division; 1945–1946	Succeeded by Post deactivated
