= Gabriel Navarrete =

United States Army soldier (1915–1988)

- Born: March 18, 1915; Ysleta, El Paso, Texas, U.S.
- Died: April 10, 1988 (aged 73)
- Burial place: Fort Bliss National Cemetery, Fort Bliss, Texas, U.S.
- Military career
- Allegiance: United States
- Branch: Army
- Service years: 1940–1945
- Service number: 20-802-266
- Units: Company E, 141st Infantry Regiment, 36th Division
- Conflicts: Battle of Rapido River
- Awards: § Awards and decorations

Gabriel Lechuga Navarrete (March 18, 1915 — April 10, 1988) was an American soldier who served in World War II. He is known for attempting to prevent the crossing that started the Battle of Rapido River, which continued without him and led to 2,128 American casualties. After his military service, Navarrete worked for El Paso County Veterans Services. He is now buried at Fort Bliss National Cemetery.

== Early life ==
Navarrete was born on March 18, 1915, in Ysleta, El Paso, Texas. He completed three years of high school before joining the military.

== Military service ==
Navarrete enlisted in the United States Army through the National Guard in El Paso, Texas, on November 25, 1940.

In September 1943, Navarrete was hospitalized when a bullet from a machine gun lacerated his cheek and forehead.

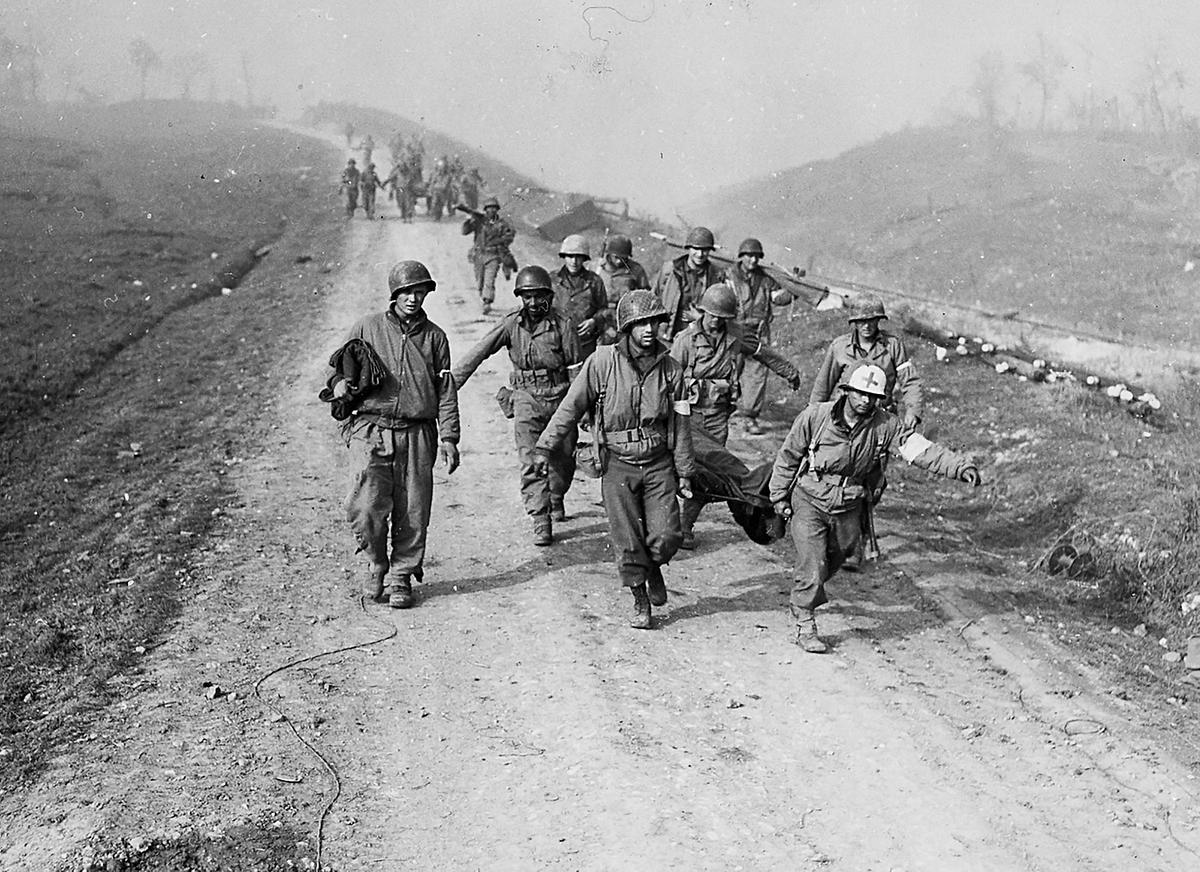
American soldiers bringing back their wounded from the Battle of Rapido River

Navarrete is most known for his service in Company E, 141st Infantry Regiment, 36th Division, during World War II. In January 1944, during the Italian campaign, he was assigned to lead a patrol across the Rapido River, gathering information about the strength of the German military and the viability of breaching its Winter Line. After being wounded in close combat, Navarrete returned to inform his division leadership that attempting to cross the river would be disastrous. General Fred L. Walker agreed with his assessment, saying, "I do not know of a single case in military history where an attempt to cross a river that is incorporated in the main line of resistance has succeeded. So I am prepared for defeat." However, higher leadership, including Major General Geoffrey Keyes and Lieutenant General Mark W. Clark, ordered the crossing to proceed. This led to the Battle of Rapido River from January 20 to 22, during which 155 American soldiers were killed, 1,052 wounded, and 921 captured or missing.

Navarrete was discharged on August 1, 1945.

After the war, in January 1946, the 36th Division Association, composed of veterans from the division, held its first meeting and called for a congressional investigation into the battle. The members of the association alleged the 36th Division's defeat was due to Clark's inexperience and poor decision-making. Robert P. Patterson, the U.S. Secretary of War, released a statement that Clark exercised sound judgement during the battle, and no action was taken against Clark.

=== Awards and decorations ===
Navarrete received the following awards and decorations for his military service:

Distinguished Service Cross
2 Silver Star Medals
Bronze Star Medal
7 Purple Hearts

== Post-military career ==
After his military service, Navarrete worked for El Paso County Veterans Services, assisting veterans with their legal and financial needs.

== Death and legacy ==
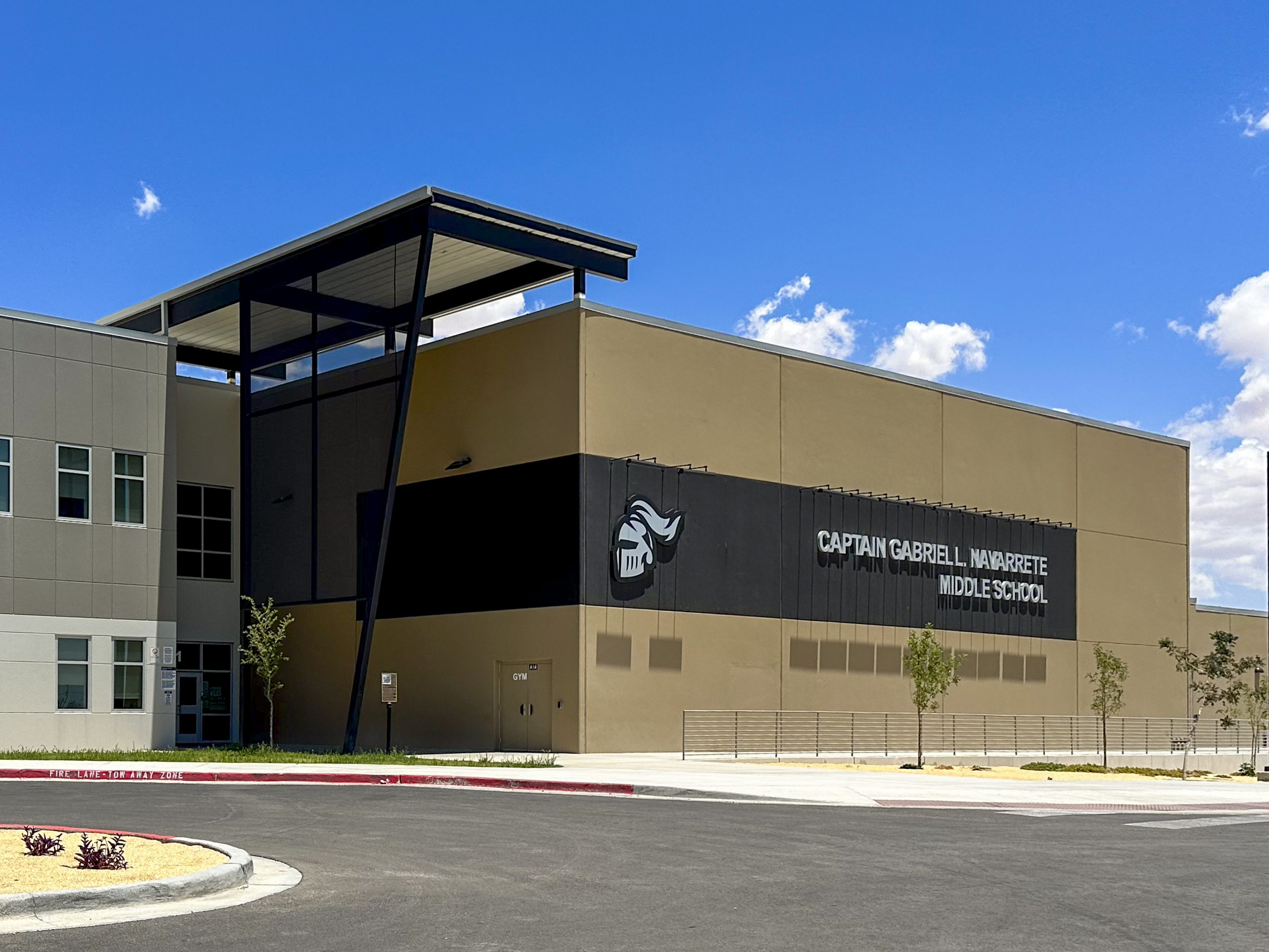
Navarrete Middle School in 2024

Navarrete died on April 10, 1988, and was buried at Fort Bliss National Cemetery on April 14.

Various memorials and streets have been named after him. Navarrete's story also highlights the significant role that Latino soldiers played in the U.S. military. The El Paso Independent School District named Captain Gabriel L. Navarrete Middle School after him. In 2021, the school opened, consolidating the campuses of Armendariz Middle School and Bassett Middle School.
