= Gari (river) =

Location
- Country: Italy

Physical characteristics
- Source
  - location: Cassino, Lazio
- Mouth: Garigliano
  - location: near Sant'Apollinare, Lazio
  - coordinates: 41.4098°N 13.8627°E
- Discharge
  - average: 25 m^{3}/s (880 cu ft/s)

Basin features
- Progression: Garigliano→ Tyrrhenian Sea

The Gari is a short river that flows in Monte Cassino, Italy at the southern end of the region of Lazio. The Battle of Gari River, better known as the Battle of Rapido River, one of the bloodiest battles of the Italian Campaign of World War II occurred in 1944, along its banks.

The river originates from a spring in the center of Cassino, in Piazza Corte, at the foot of Montecassino. It flows underground and reappears in the Villa Comunale, the main public park in the town. In the thermal area known as Varronian Thermal Baths, it increases its discharge considerably from several springs, as well as from the river Rapido. In Sant'Apollinare, few miles south of Cassino, it joins the Liri to form the Garigliano river, which marks the border between Lazio and Campania.

== The battle ==
The Gari river (erroneously identified as the Rapido) was the site of a bloodily repulsed and ill-conceived assault during the Italian Campaign of World War II by the U.S. 36th Infantry Division, led by Major General Fred Walker from 20–22 January 1944 when the Allies were attempting to establish a bridgehead in the vicinity of Sant'Angelo in Thoedice (a frazione of Cassino) to launch attacks on the Gustav Line near Monte Cassino. The assault was opposed by two battalions from the German 15th Panzer Grenadier Division under General-Lieutenant Rudolf Sperl. American troops suffered over 2,000 casualties in the failed assault.

On 20 January 1946, the US 36th Division Veteran's Association unanimously called for a Congressional inquiry into General Mark Clark's actions during the 36th Infantry Division's disastrous crossing of the Rapido River on the night of 20 January 1944. The petition read:

"Be it resolved, that the men of the 36th Division Association petition the Congress of the United States to investigate the river Rapido fiasco and take the necessary steps to correct a military system that will permit an inefficient and inexperienced officer, such a General Mark W. Clark, in a high command to destroy the young manhood of this country and to prevent future soldiers being sacrificed wastefully and uselessly."

Two resolutions were heard in the House of Representatives, one of which claimed the incident was "one of the most colossal blunders of the Second World War...a murderous blunder" that "every man connected with this undertaking knew...was doomed to failure."

Clark was absolved of blame by the House of Representatives but never made comment on the Rapido River episode following World War II.

== Memorial ==
On the bridge in Sant'Angelo, known as "Ponte delle quattro battaglie" ("Bridge of the Four Battles"), there is a peace bell in remembrance of the casualties of the assaults. There is also memorial to the 2nd Battalion of the Bedfordshire and Hertfordshire Regiment, which had been one of the first units to cross the Gari River on 12 May 1944.
