= Louis E. Hibbs =

United States Army general

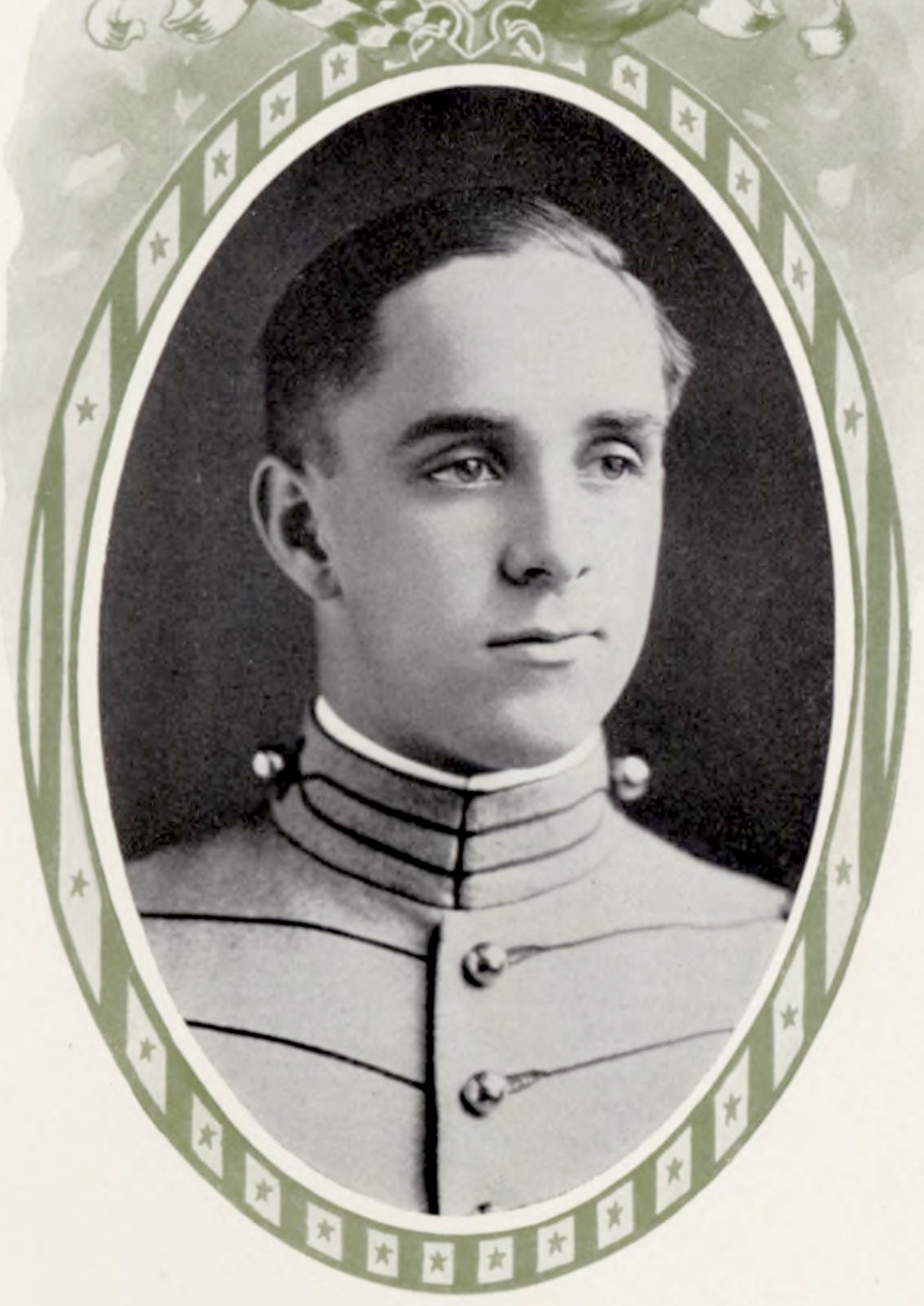
- At West Point in 1916
- Born: October 3, 1893; Washington, D.C., U.S.
- Died: April 28, 1970 (aged 76); Vero Beach, Florida, U.S.
- Occupation: Military officer

Major General Louis Emerson Hibbs (October 3, 1893 − April 28, 1970) was a United States Army officer who served in both World War I and World War II, where he commanded the 63rd Infantry Division.

== Military career ==
Louis Emerson Hibbs was born on October 3, 1893, in Washington, D.C. In 1912 he entered the United States Military Academy (USMA) and graduated from there, 16th in a class of 125, as a second lieutenant in the Field Artillery Branch of the United States Army four years later in June 1916. He was promoted to first lieutenant on July 1, 1916, less than a month after graduating, and was by then serving with the 3rd Field Artillery Regiment, then stationed at Eagle Pass, Texas.

Hibbs saw service in World War I, which the United States had entered in April 1917. On May 15, 1917, Hibbs was promoted to captain. He was eventually transferred to the 5th Field Artillery Regiment, which was then serving in Western Front, the main theater of war, as part of the 1st Division of the American Expeditionary Forces (AEF). On July 3, 1918, he was promoted to major. He was adjutant to a battalion of the 5th Field Artillery and, from April 1918, he commanded a battalion of the 5th Field Artillery until he was wounded in June at the battle of Cantigny. After recovering from his injury he then served as chief of staff to the chief of artillery of II Corps between September and October 1918 but was again wounded, this time during an attack on the Hindenburg Line near Le Cateau. He was then sent to a hospital in London, England, but returned to the United States in late December. By this time the Armistice with Germany had brought World War I to an end.

On July 1, 1938, Hibbs was promoted to lieutenant colonel. In the following year Hibbs found himself returning to the USMA, where he was Graduate Manager of Athletics. While there, he was promoted to colonel on June 26, 1941.

He retained this post until February 1942, two months after the United States had entered World War II, when he was made the commander of the Artillery of the 36th Infantry Division, an Army National Guard formation recruiting from Texas and commanded by Major General Fred L. Walker, who had been one of Hibbs's instructors at the Army War College. On March 11, 1942, Hibbs was promoted to brigadier general.

He died in Vero Beach, Florida on April 28, 1970.
