= Fred L. Walker =

United States Army general (1887-1969)

Fred Livingood Walker
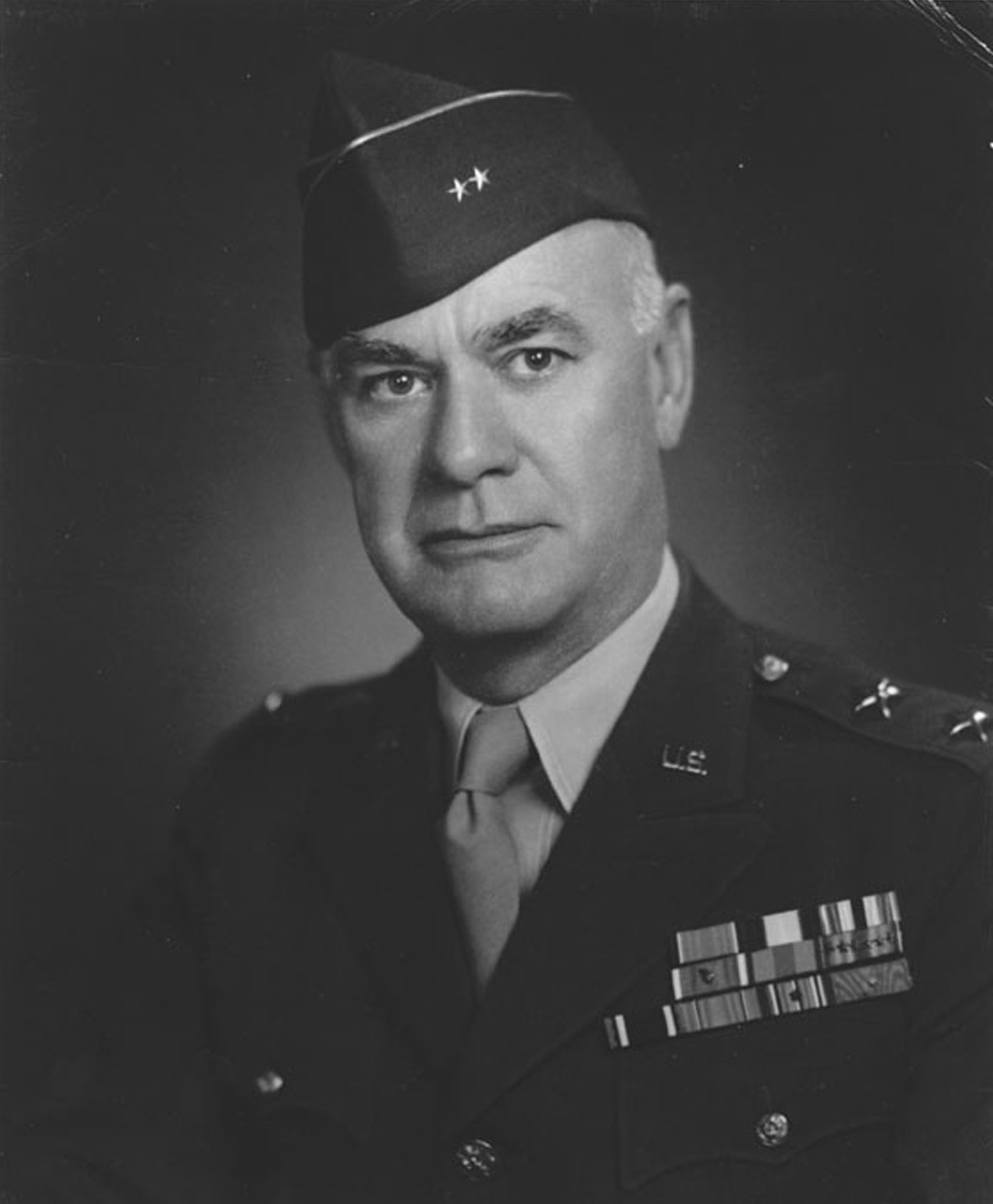
- Major General Fred L. Walker during World War II.
- Born: June 11, 1887; Fairfield County, Ohio, United States
- Died: October 6, 1969 (aged 82); Washington, D.C., United States
- Burial place: Kirkersville Cemetery, Kirkersville, Ohio
- Military career
- Allegiance: United States
- Branch: United States Army
- Service years: 1911−1946
- Rank: Major General
- Service number: 0-3029
- Unit: Infantry Branch
- Commands: 1st Battalion, 30th Infantry Regiment; 15th Infantry Regiment; 36th Infantry Division; United States Army Infantry School
- Conflicts: Pancho Villa Expedition; World War I World War II
- Awards: Distinguished Service Cross (2); Army Distinguished Service Medal; Silver Star; Purple Heart (2); Hall of Honor

Major General Fred Livingood Walker (June 11, 1887 – October 6, 1969) was a highly decorated senior United States Army officer who served in both World War I and World War II and was awarded with the second highest military decorations in both wars, the Distinguished Service Cross (DSC). During World War I he commanded a battalion on the Western Front, fighting with distinction in the Second Battle of the Marne in July 1918. During World War II, Walker commanded the 36th (Texas) Infantry Division throughout its service in the Italian campaign, from September 1943 until June 1944.

== Early life and military career ==
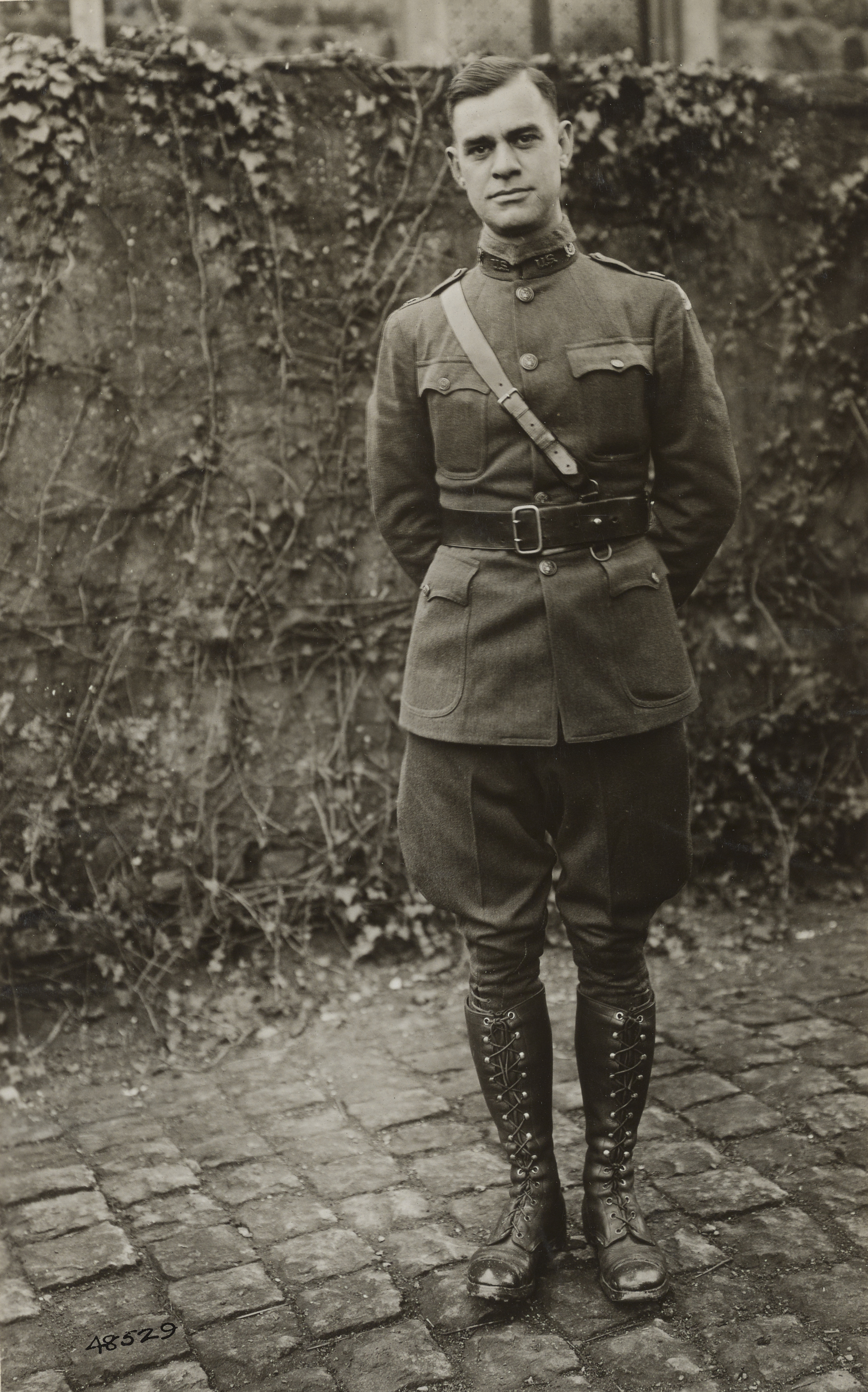
Lieutenant Colonel Fred L. Walker, Infantry Detachment Division Inspector. 3rd Division, Army of Occupation, Andernach on Rhine, Germany, pictured here on January 4, 1919.

Fred Livingood Walker was born on June 11, 1887, in Fairfield County, Ohio, as a son of William Henry Walker and his wife Belle (néé Mason). Walker attended Ohio State University and graduated in 1911 with a degree in engineering, also serving in a cavalry unit of the Ohio National Guard. Subsequently, he was accepted into the Regular Army and commissioned as an officer with the rank of second lieutenant in the Infantry. He served briefly with an Infantry unit in Fort Sam Houston in San Antonio, Texas, and then he was transferred to the Philippines, where he served with the 13th Infantry Regiment.

In 1914, he was transferred back to the United States, where he was stationed in Eagle Pass, Texas, and also took part in the Pancho Villa Expedition under the command of Brigadier General John J. Pershing (later destined to achieve the highest rank in the United States Army, that of General of the Armies).

After the American entry into World War I (in April 1917) Walker was sent overseas and served with the 30th Infantry Regiment, part of the 3rd Division, into the trenches of the Western Front. The division was part of the American Expeditionary Forces (AEF). Walker, as a 31-year old major, commanded the 1st Battalion of his regiment during the Second Battle of the Marne in the summer of 1918 and distinguished himself during heavy combat. In July 1918, Walker received the Distinguished Service Cross (DSC) for his service during the battle, with the medal's citation reading:

The President of the United States of America, authorized by Act of Congress, July 9, 1918, takes pleasure in presenting the Distinguished Service Cross to Major (Infantry) Fred L. Walker, United States Army, for extraordinary heroism in action while serving with 30th Infantry Regiment, 3d Division, A.E.F., near the Marne River, France, 15 July 1918. Holding a front of more than 4 1/2 kilometers along the Marne River, Major Walker commanded a front-line battalion, which received the principal shock of the German attack on the French Army Corps front, but inflicted great losses on the enemy as the latter crossed the river. Those who succeeded in crossing were thrown into such confusion that they were unable to follow the barrage; and, through the effective leadership of this officer, no Germans remained in his sector south of the river at the end of the day's action. When one platoon had been cut off by an entire enemy battalion near the river, he sent other units to its relief and captured the entire German battalion, numbering 200 soldiers and 5 officers, including the battalion commander.

In addition, he also received the Silver Star and was wounded twice during the war.

== Between the wars ==
He returned to the United States, where he served as an instructor at the United States Army Infantry School at Fort Benning, Georgia, a position he held for three years. He then attended the United States Army Command and General Staff College, from where he was an honor graduate, in 1927. This was followed by his being made commandant of the Shattuck School in Minnesota, from 1927 to 1932. After attending and later graduating from the United States Army War College in 1933, he remained there as an instructor for well over three years, where he taught many students who would later serve with in the not too distant future, such as Mark W. Clark, Courtney Hodges, Louis E. Hibbs and Omar Bradley.

He then went to China where he served with the 15th Infantry Regiment, before returning to the United States, serving as a G-3 with the Second Army. In April 1941 he was promoted to brigadier general and served as the assistant division commander (ADC) of the 2nd Infantry Division.

== World War II ==
In September 1941, during World War II (although the United States was still officially neutral), Walker was appointed Commanding General (CG) of the 36th (Texas) Infantry Division stationed at Camp Bowie near Brownwood, Texas, succeeding Major General Claude V. Birkhead. Walker commanded the division during the Louisiana Maneuvers in fall 1941 and the Carolina Maneuvers in the summer of 1942.

In April 1943, the 36th Infantry Division deployed from the New York Port of Embarkation to the Mediterranean Theater of Operations. Walker commanded the division in training operations in North Africa, near Rabat, Morocco and Arzew, Algeria. The 36th Division first saw combat in the Italian Campaign in September 1943, when, under the command of Major General Ernest Dawley's VI Corps (later replaced by Major General John Lucas) of the U.S. Fifth Army, commanded by Lieutenant General Mark Clark, it took part in Operation Avalanche, part of the Allied invasion of Italy. The assault landings were successful, although the division suffered heavy casualties when the German troops launched numerous counterattacks in an attempt to push the Allies back into the sea.

Walker was 56 years old in 1943, making him the oldest divisional commander in the United States Army at the time. He suffered from medical problems, including an elevated heart rate, arthritis and bouts of temporary blindness. While in Italy, one of his sons served as his operations officer and another as his personal aide.

Walker commanded the 36th Division during the whole of its service in the grueling slog up Italy, crossing the Volturno Line in October, and by late November/early December, by which time the division was part of Major General Geoffrey Keyes' U.S. II Corps, were fighting in front of the Bernhardt Line, part of the formidable Winter Line defenses, suffering heavy casualties in the Battle of San Pietro Infine, later participating in the Rapido river crossing, part of the First Battle of Monte Cassino, and Monte Artemisio on the drive north through Rome and beyond. The fighting in the early months of the Allied campaign in Italy proved very costly for the 36th Division, due to determined German resistance, the mountainous terrain, and the worsening winter weather. Walker was critical of the leadership in Italy, writing, "The Italian campaign will not be finished this week, nor next. Our wasteful policy or method of taking one mountain mass after another gains no tactical advantage, locally. There is always another mountain mass beyond with the Germans dug in on it, just as before. Somebody on top side, who has control of the required means, should figure out a way to decisively defeat the German army in Italy, instead of just pushing, pushing, pushing."

Unfortunately, the crossing of the Rapido that took place on January 20–22, 1944 was a total failure, which resulted in heavy losses for the 36th Division, suffering approximately 1,681 casualties–143 killed, 663 wounded and 875 missing. After the war, the Thirty-Sixth Division Veteran Association called for a Congressional investigation of this battle, alleging that its failure was due to the inefficiency and inexperience of General Clark. However, no action was taken against General Clark. Walker had been pessimistic about the operations' chances of success from the start, writing on 17 January "It appears to me that the defeat of the Germans on the Marne on July 15, 1918, is about to be repeated in reverse on the Rapido in January 1944." He blamed his superiors, Keyes, commanding II Corps, and Clark, commanding the Fifth Army, attempting to convince them to launch the attack further north, without success, "They do not understand the problems and do not know what I am talking about."

In July 1944, Walker was transferred back to the United States and appointed as Commander of the U.S. Army Infantry School at Fort Benning, Georgia. He served in this capacity until April 30, 1946, when he retired.

In September 1944, Walker was awarded with his second Distinguished Service Cross for his leadership of the 36th Infantry Division.

== Decorations ==
Distinguished Service Cross with Oak Leaf Cluster
Army Distinguished Service Medal
Silver Star
Purple Heart with Oak Leaf Cluster
Mexican Service Medal
World War I Victory Medal with five campaign clasps
Army of Occupation of Germany Medal
American Defense Service Medal
American Campaign Medal
European-African-Middle Eastern Campaign Medal with four campaign stars
World War II Victory Medal

In 2009 he was inducted to the Texas Military Hall of Honor.

== Bibliography ==
- Walker, Fred L. (2020). From Texas to Rome: Fighting World War II and the Italian Campaign with the 36th Infantry Division. Savas Beatie. ISBN 9781611214826.

Military offices
Preceded by Claude V. Birkhead	Commanding General 36th Infantry Division; 1941–1944	Succeeded by John E. Dahlquist
Preceded by Charles H. Bonesteel	Commandant of the United States Army Infantry School; 1944–1945	Succeeded by John W. O'Daniel
