= Rapido (river) =

Location
- Country: Italy

Physical characteristics
- Source
  - location: Monti delle Mainarde
  - elevation: c. 2,000 m (6,600 ft)
- Mouth: Gari
  - location: near Cassino
  - coordinates: 41.4710°N 13.8372°E
- Length: c. 40 km (25 mi)
- Discharge
  - average: 25 m^{3}/s (880 cu ft/s)

Basin features
- Progression: Gari→ Garigliano→ Tyrrhenian Sea

The Rapido is a short river (c. 40 kilometres (25 mi)) which flows in the Italian province of Frosinone. The river is known for the Battle of the Rapido River, despite it actually occurring on the Gari River.

Its source is close to the border between Lazio and Molise on the slopes of the Mainarde mountains. The river bathes the commune of Sant'Elia Fiumerapido after which it becomes known as the Gari.

Fed by numerous karstic springs, the river has a relatively high and reliable discharge: 25 m³/s on average and never dropping below 10 m³/s.
