= Battle of Rapido River =

1944 World War II battle in Italy

- Part of the Winter Line and the battle for Rome, Italian campaign
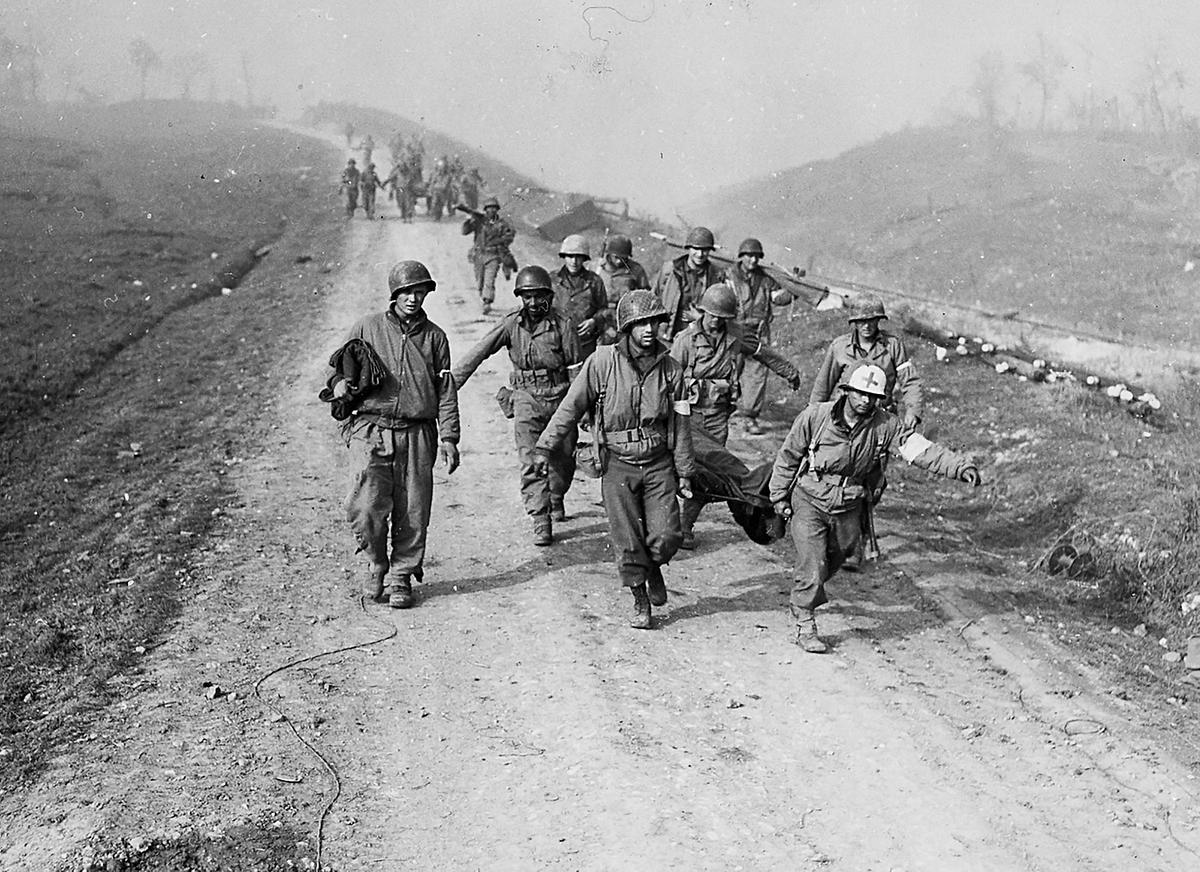
- American soldiers bring back wounded during the attempt to cross the Gari River near Cassino, Italy, January 1944
| Date | 20–22 January 1944 |
| Location | Gari River, Italy 41°26′41″N 13°49′57″E |
| Result | German victory |

Belligerents
| United States | (Nazi Germany) Germany |

Commanders and leaders
| (United States) Mark Clark (United States) Geoffrey Keyes (United States) Fred Walker | (Nazi Germany) Heinrich von Vietinghoff (Nazi Germany) Frido von Senger und Etterlin |

Strength
| (United States) 36th Infantry Division | (Nazi Germany) 15th Panzergrenadier Division |

Casualties and losses
| 155 killed 1,052 wounded 921 captured or missing | 64 killed 179 wounded |

The Battle of Rapido River was fought from 20 to 22 January 1944 during one of the Allies' many attempts to breach the Winter Line during the Italian Campaign of World War II. Despite its name, the battle occurred on the Gari River.

Units of the US 36th Infantry Division, commanded by Major General Fred Walker crossed the Gari River in boats and seized the west bank of the river. However, the Americans were cut off from reinforcements and subjected to heavy fire and counterattacks from elements of the German 15th Panzergrenadier Division. The 36th Infantry Division suffered very high losses, and after two days of fighting, the survivors retreated across the river.

== Background ==
In late 1943, the Italian Campaign had reached a turning point. The Allied advance through Italy had bogged down around Monte Cassino, which was a crucial point in the Axis defensive position known as the Winter Line. As a result, Allied commanders planned to outflank the Germans with Operation Shingle, an amphibious landing at Anzio. To assist in the landing, Allied forces to the south were to launch attacks in the days leading up to Operation Shingle by seizing German positions across the Garigliano and the Rapido River.

It was hoped that German forces would be drawn away from Anzio to counter those attacks. However, the simultaneous attack at Anzio limited the availability of air support for the river crossings.

Lieutenant General Mark Clark, commanding general of the US Fifth Army ordered a crossing of the Gari River, south of Monte Cassino, with two regiments (the 141st and the 143rd Infantry) of the US 36th Infantry Division, commanded by Major General Fred Walker. After a bridgehead had been secured, an armored advance was to proceed across the Liri Valley.

== Battle ==
On the night of 20 January 1944, the US 36th Infantry Division, under command of Major General Geoffrey Keyes's II Corps, fired an artillery barrage of 31,000 rounds on German positions across the Gari River, which resulted in only negligible damage. Feint attacks were conducted by the 34th Infantry Division to the north, near Monte Cassino, to divert attention from the main advance. After the barrage, the 141st and the 143rd Infantry Regiments were ordered to cross the river, which began at 19:00. Initial casualties were inflicted on the Allies by landmines on the east bank of the river, although engineers were tasked with clearing approaches to the river. German artillery responding to the American barrage also hit elements of the 141st Regiment before they were able to reach the river. Two rifle companies of the 143rd successfully crossed the river, but German fire resulted in the loss of too many men and landing boats, and the foothold was abandoned. The 141st fared even worse, withdrawing with heavy casualties after landing directly opposite a German minefield.

The next day, both regiments were ordered to perform another attack beginning at 16:00. Although the assault met with more success, the American foothold was still unsustainable, as withering fire from the 15th Panzergrenadier Division prevented the construction of pontoon and Bailey bridges by engineers. Without the bridges, armor could not assist in the attack, and the infantry were left to fight on their own, which resulted in devastating casualties for the two regiments. After more than 20 hours of fruitless combat, both were ordered to withdraw. The 143rd was able to withdraw relatively intact, but much of the 141st was left stranded since their bridges and boats had been destroyed by enemy fire. The German defenders mounted a counterattack against the trapped Americans and captured hundreds of soldiers.

Major General Fred L. Walker decided against committing the division's last regiment, the 142nd Infantry, and the battle concluded at 21:40 on January 22.

== Aftermath ==
No significant gains were made in either assault, and the original objective of luring away German forces was entirely unsuccessful.

The crossing of the Gari ("Rapido") River on January 20 was preceded by the successful crossing of the Garigliano River (the same river but further downstream) on January 17. These actions at least had the effect of diverting two German Panzergrenadier divisions (the 29th and the 90th) away from Rome. The Germans had positioned these two divisions near Rome in January to repel a possible Allied invasion, taking advantage of the temporary lull on the Winter Line. Renewed fightning on the Winter Line - specifically, the crossing of the Garigliano by the Allies - forced the Germans to call these two divisions back to the Winter Line, leaving the Rome area nearly undefended, which allowed the Anzio landing to happen, in the very beginning, almost unopposed.

Significant controversy followed the American defeat, with Clark criticizing Walker's execution of the battle plan. Walker responded that the entire battle had been foolhardy and unnecessary, and that Clark's plan, which Walker had protested, was all but guaranteed to fail. The battle was one of the largest defeats suffered by the US Army during World War II and was the subject of an investigation in 1946 by the US Congress to establish responsibility for the disaster.

War Secretary Robert P. Patterson prepared a report in response to the congressional investigation in which he concluded that "the action to which the Thirty-sixth Division was committed was a necessary one and that General Clark exercised sound judgment in planning it and in ordering it." Colonel Miller Ainsworth, president of the 36th Infantry Division Association, testified before Congress against Patterson's conclusions, and criticized what he perceived as Clark attempting to evade investigation of his conduct.

== See also ==
- Battle of Anzio
- Fred L. Walker
- Mark W. Clark
