= Geoffrey Keyes =

American general and football coach (1888–1967)

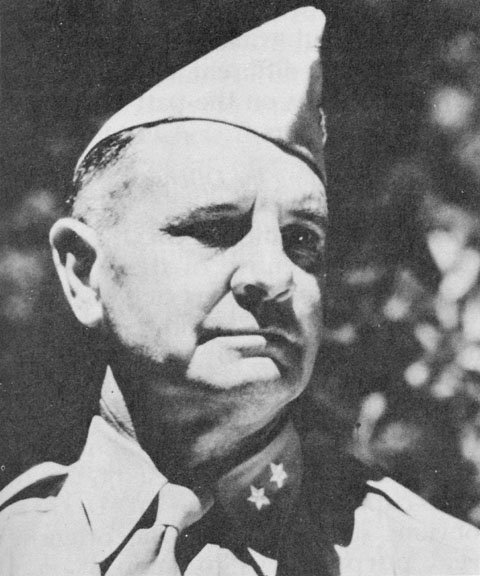
- Born: October 30, 1888; Fort Bayard, New Mexico, U.S.
- Died: September 17, 1967 (aged 78); Washington, D.C., U.S.
- Burial place: West Point Cemetery, West Point, New York, U.S.
- Military career
- Allegiance: United States
- Branch: United States Army
- Service years: 1913–1950; 1951–1954
- Rank: Lieutenant General
- Nickname: "Geoff"
- Service number: 0-3561
- Units: Cavalry Branch
- Commands: Third United States Army; Seventh United States Army; II Corps; I Armored Corps; 9th Armored Division
- Conflicts: Pancho Villa Expedition; World War I World War II
- Awards: Distinguished Service Cross; Army Distinguished Service Medal (3); Silver Star (2); Legion of Merit; Bronze Star Medal

Geoffrey Keyes (October 30, 1888 – September 17, 1967) was a highly decorated senior United States Army officer who served with distinction in Sicily and Italy during World War II.

== Early life ==
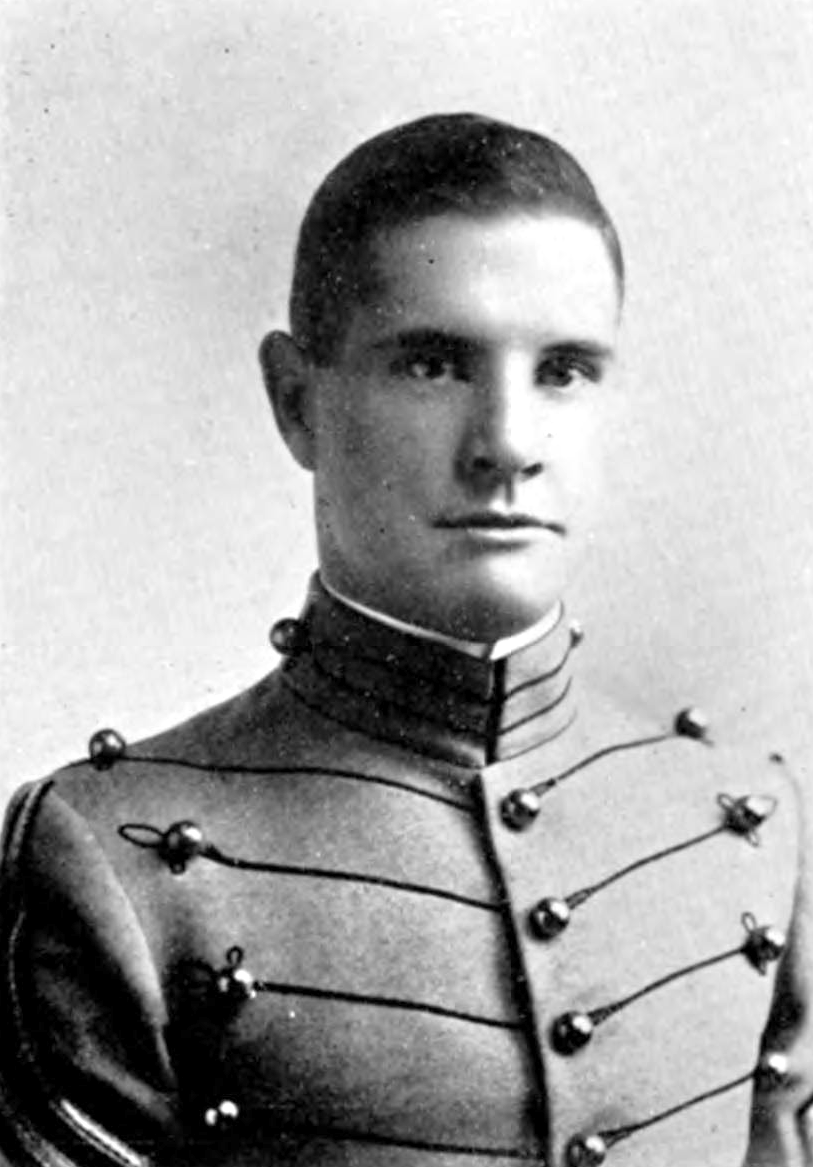
At West Point in 1913

Keyes was born on October 30, 1888, in Fort Bayard, New Mexico, the son of Captain Alexander S. B. Keyes, a United States Army officer, and his wife, Virginia Maxwell Keyes. Like his father, Geoffrey enrolled as a cadet at the United States Military Academy (USMA) at West Point, New York, on March 2, 1908, and graduated, 38 in a class of 93, on June 12, 1913, being commissioned as a second lieutenant, into the Cavalry Branch of the United States Army. His first assignment was with the 6th Cavalry Regiment, where he served until October 1916 and participated in the Pancho Villa Expedition.

== Early military career ==
Keyes' next assignment was at the USMA, where he served as an instructor of French language. He was also head football coach for one season in 1917, compiling a record of 7–1.

Keyes' interwar service included duty with the Panama Canal Division as an Assistant Chief of Staff (G-3), instructor at the USMA and the United States Army Cavalry School at Fort Riley, Kansas, and Chief of Supply of Supply Division within War Department. He attended the United States Army Command and General Staff School from August 1925 until June 1926 and the United States Army War College, which he attended from 1936 to 1937. His classmates there included Matthew Ridgway, Mark W. Clark, Edward H. Brooks, and Walter Bedell Smith, all of whom would rise to high rank in the years to follow.

== World War II ==
In 1940, during World War II, Keyes was chief of staff of the 2nd Armored Division, which was then commanded by Major General George S. Patton who, like Keyes, was a fellow cavalryman who had served with distinction in World War I and had taken a significant interest in armored warfare. Patton was to think highly of Keyes, later stating that he "had the best tactical mind of any officer I know."

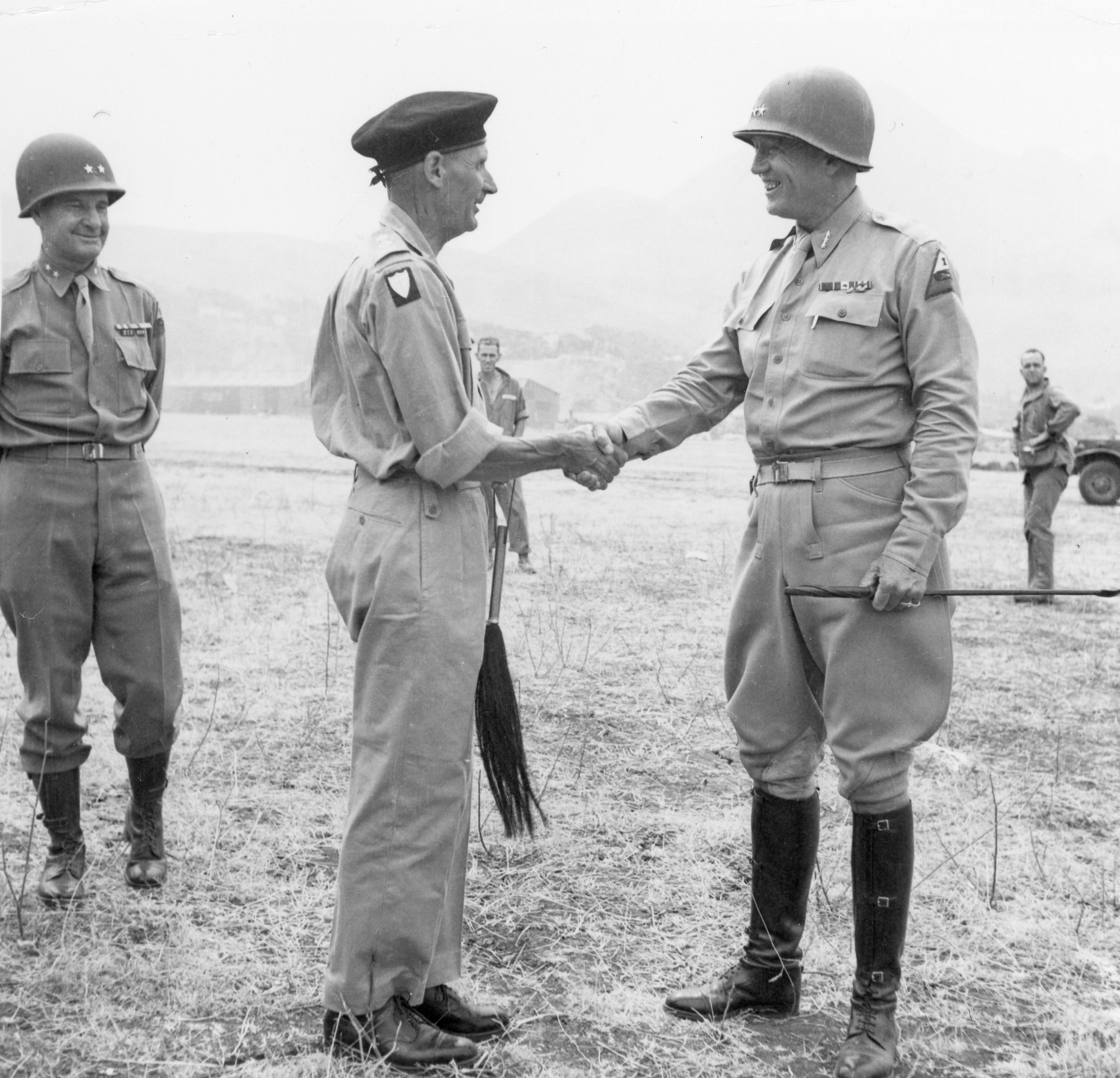
General Sir Bernard Montgomery shakes hands with Lieutenant General George S. Patton at an airport at Palermo, Sicily, July 28, 1943. Major General Geoffrey Keyes, deputy commander of Patton's Seventh Army, is stood to the far left of the picture.

In January 1942, a month after the Japanese attack on Pearl Harbor on December 7, 1941, and the subsequent German declaration of war on the United States, on December 11, Keyes, promoted to the one-star general officer rank of brigadier general on January 15, assumed command of Combat Command 'B' (CCB) of the 3rd Armored Division. In July, now a two-star major general (having been promoted on June 22), he raised the 9th Armored Division and, in September, relinquished command of the division to Major General John W. Leonard, before going to North Africa as Deputy Commander of the I Armored Corps, commanded by Patton, which was later redesignated the Seventh United States Army for the Allied invasion of Sicily.

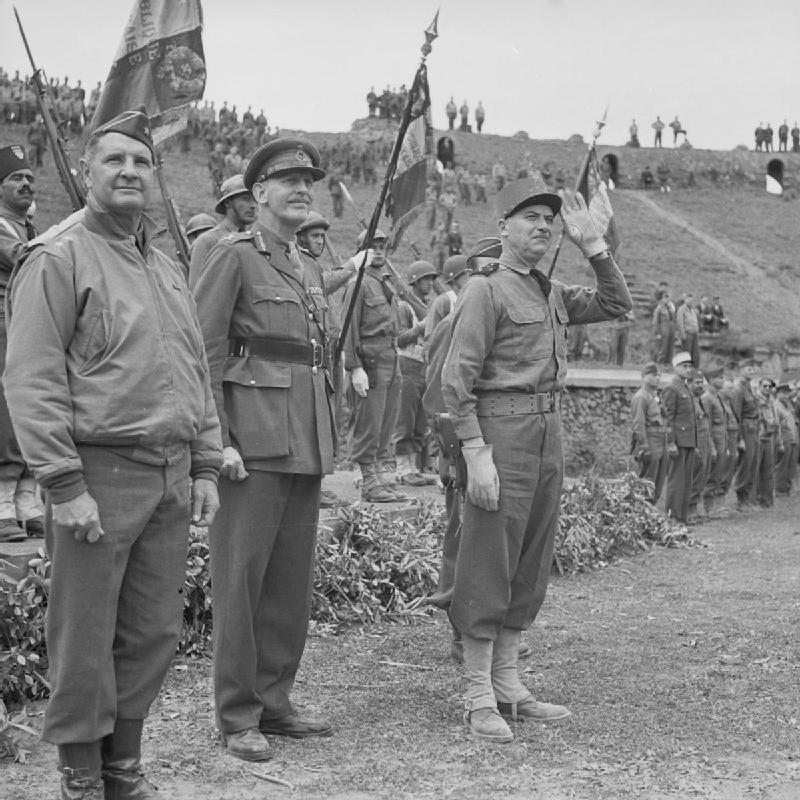
From left to right: Major General Geoffrey Keyes, British Major General Angus Lyell Collier and French General Alphonse Juin in Pompeii, pictured here between 1943 and 1945

Keyes was originally serving as deputy commander of the Seventh Army during the campaign, once again serving under Patton, in July 1943. During Operation Husky, when Patton split the Seventh Army in half, Keyes was given command of the Provisional Corps, composed of the 2nd Armored Division, the 3rd Infantry Division and the 82nd Airborne Division, along with two United States Army Ranger battalions, and supporting units. Advancing 125 miles in five days, through difficult mountainous terrain, the corps captured most of Western Sicily, including Palermo, the Sicilian capital, along with some 53,000 Axis soldiers, mainly Italians, along with nearly 600 vehicles, in exchange for less than 300 casualties. The corps then settled down for garrison duties and the administration of western Sicily until it was disbanded on August 20, three days after the end of the campaign. For his actions in the brief Sicilian campaign Keyes was awarded the Army Distinguished Service Medal. General Dwight D. Eisenhower, the Supreme Allied Commander in the Mediterranean Theater of Operations (MTO) wrote to General George C. Marshall, the Chief of Staff of the United States Army, noting that his "reports on Keyes as an acting Corps Commander in the Sicilian affair was most favorable".

General Alphonse Juin with American generals Geoffrey Keyes, Mark W. Clark, Alfred M. Gruenther, and Lucian Truscott, at Rome City Hall on June 5, 1944.

In September 1943 Keyes assumed command of the II Corps from Major General John P. Lucas and commanded it throughout the Italian Campaign, landing in Italy in mid-November and serving under Lieutenant General Mark W. Clark's United States Fifth Army. Clark, who was nearly eight years younger than Keyes, had been a fellow student at the United States Army War College in the late 1930s. His first major battle was the Battle of San Pietro Infine and later, with Major General Fred L. Walker's 36th Infantry Division under command, his corps took part in the controversial Battle of Rapido River, part of the first Battle of Monte Cassino. The corps sustained heavy losses in the battle. The corps was then involved in Operation Diadem, the fighting on the Gothic Line and the Spring 1945 offensive in Italy, which ended the fighting in Italy. Keyes was promoted to the rank of lieutenant general on 17 April 1945, three weeks before the surrender of Germany on 8 May 1945.

== Post war ==
After the war Keyes commanded the Seventh Army from 8 September 1945 until its deactivation on 31 March 1946. In December 1945 he was by his friend George S. Patton's side when the latter died. This was followed by command of the United States Third Army, Patton's former command, from 1946 to 1947. In 1947, Keyes was appointed United States High Commissioner on the Allied Council for Austria. He served as Director, Weapons Systems Evaluation Group (WSEG) from 1951 to 1954.

Keyes retired from the army in 1954, after 41 years of service. He died on September 17, 1967, at Walter Reed Hospital in Washington, D.C., just a few weeks short of his 79th birthday. He is interred at West Point Cemetery.

== Decorations ==
Lieutenant General Keyes's ribbon bar:

1st Row	Army Distinguished Service Medal w/ two Oak Leaf Clusters	Silver Star w/ Oak Leaf Cluster		Legion of Merit	
2nd Row	Bronze Star Medal	Mexican Service Medal		World War I Victory Medal	American Defense Service Medal
3rd Row	American Campaign Medal	European-African-Middle Eastern Campaign Medal w/ one silver and two bronze service stars		World War II Victory Medal	Army of Occupation Medal
4th Row	National Defense Service Medal	Honorary Companion of the Order of the Bath (United Kingdom)		Commandeur of the Legion of Honour	French Croix de guerre 1939–1945 w/ palm
5th Row	Grand Officer of the Order of Ouissam Alaouite	Grand Officer of the Order of Saints Maurice and Lazarus (Italy)		Silver Medal of Military Valor (Italy)	Grand Officer of the Military Order of the White Lion
6th Row	Czechoslovak War Cross 1939-1945	Military Order of Savoy (Italy)	Papal Lateran Cross (Vatican)	Officer of the Legion of Honour	

== Head coaching record ==
Year	Team	Overall	Conference	Standing	Bowl/playoffs
Army Cadets (Independent) (1917)
1917	Army	7–1			
Army:		7–1			
Total:		7–1			

== Bibliography ==
- Bloody River: The Real Tragedy of the Rapido. Houghton Mifflin. 1970. OCLC 1020217216.
- Blumenson, Martin (1998). Bloody River: The Real Tragedy of the Rapido. Texas A&M University Press. ISBN 9780890968529.
- Taaffe, Stephen R. (2013). Marshall and His Generals: U.S. Army Commanders in World War II. Lawrence, Kansas: University Press of Kansas. ISBN 978-0-7006-1942-9. OCLC 840162019.
- [

https://books.google.co.uk/books/about/Patton_s_Tactician.html?id=w8mrEAAAQBAJ&printsec=frontcover&source=gb_mobile_entity&hl=en&newbks=1&newbks_redir=0&gboemv=1&gl=GB&redir_esc=y#v=onepage&q&f=false]

Military offices
Preceded by Newly activated organization	Commanding General 9th Armored Division; June–September 1942	Succeeded by John W. Leonard
Preceded by John P. Lucas	Commanding General II Corps; 1943–1945	Post deactivated
Preceded by Wade H. Haislip	Commanding General Seventh Army; 1945–1946	Succeeded by Oscar Griswold
Preceded by Lucian Truscott	Commanding General Third United States Army; 1946–1947	Succeeded by Ernest N. Harmon
