= Mark W. Clark =

American general (1896–1984)

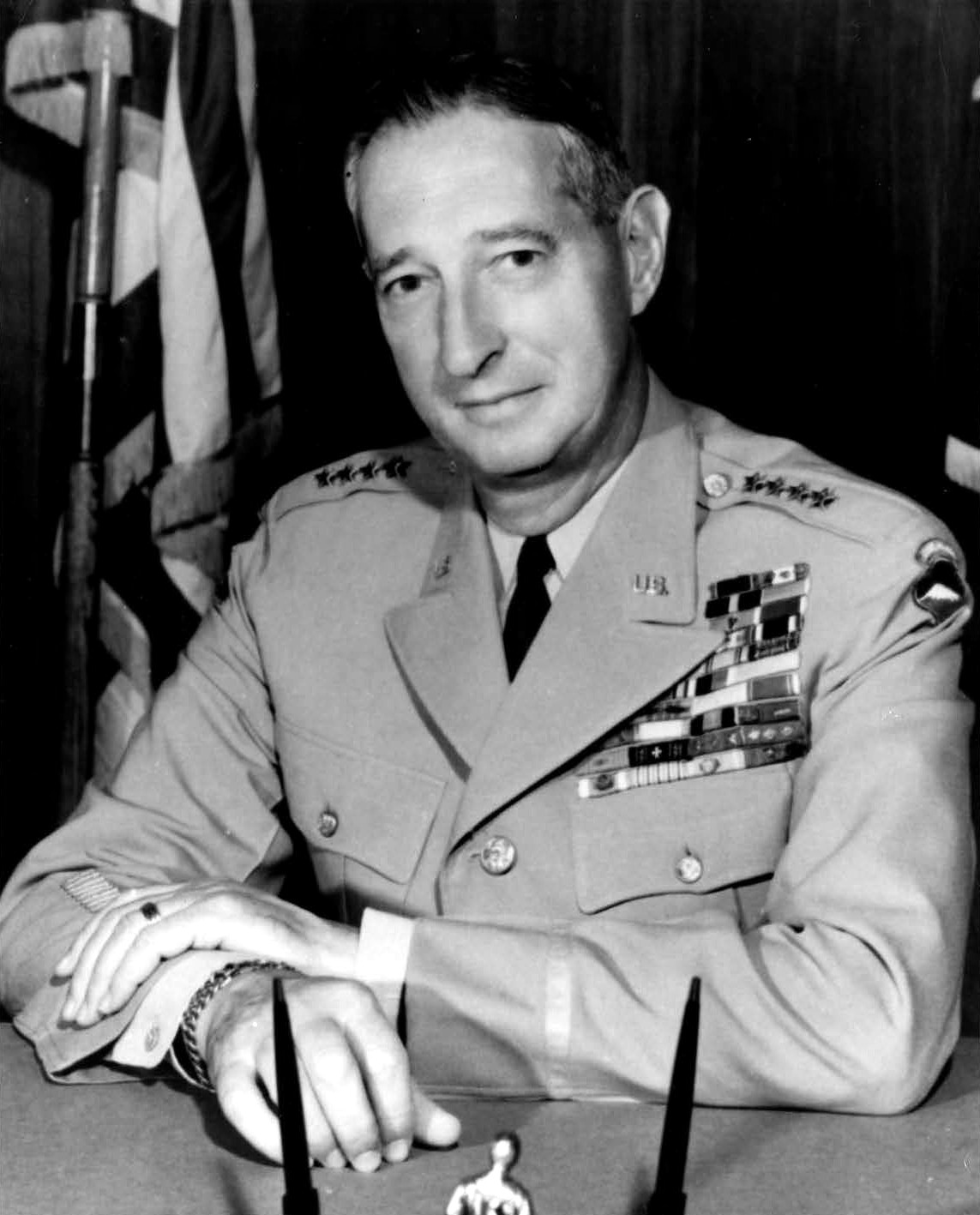
- Official portrait, 1945
- Born: 1 May 1896; Madison Barracks, Sackets Harbor, New York, U.S.
- Died: 17 April 1984 (aged 87); Charleston, South Carolina, U.S.
- Burial place: The Citadel, Charleston, South Carolina
- Spouse: Maurine Doran (m. 1924; died 1966)
- Military career
- Allegiance: United States
- Branch: United States Army
- Service years: 1917–1953
- Rank: General
- Nicknames: "American Eagle" "Wayne" "Contraband" (while at West Point)
- Service number: 0–5309
- Unit: Infantry Branch
- Commands: United Nations Command; Sixth United States Army; 15th Army Group; Seventh United States Army; Fifth United States Army; II Corps; 3rd Battalion, 11th Infantry Regiment
- Conflicts: World War I; World War II; North African campaign; Operation Torch; Operation Flagpole; Italian campaign; Operation Husky; Allied invasion of Italy; Operation Avalanche; Barbara Line; Bernhardt Line; Battle of Monte Cassino; Battle of Anzio; Battle of Cisterna; Gothic Line; Battle of Monte Castello; Winter Line; Battle of San Pietro Infine; Battle of Rapido River; Operation Grapeshot; Occupation of Austria; Korean War
- Awards: Distinguished Service Cross; Army Distinguished Service Medal (4); Navy Distinguished Service Medal; Legion of Merit; Bronze Star Medal; Purple Heart
- Other work: President of The Citadel

Mark Wayne Clark (1 May 1896 – 17 April 1984) was a United States Army officer who fought in World War I, World War II, and the Korean War. He was the youngest four-star general in the U.S. Army during World War II.

During World War I, he was a company commander and served in France in 1918, as a 22-year-old captain, where he was seriously wounded by shrapnel. After the war, the future US Army Chief of Staff, General George C. Marshall, noticed Clark's abilities. During World War II, he commanded the United States Fifth Army, and later the 15th Army Group, in the Italian campaign. He is known for leading the Fifth Army when it captured Rome in June 1944, around the same time as the Normandy landings. He was also the head of planning for Operation Torch, the largest seaborne invasion at the time.

On 10 March 1945, at the age of 48, Clark became one of the youngest American officers promoted to the rank of four-star general. Dwight D. Eisenhower, a close friend, considered Clark to be a brilliant staff officer and trainer of men.

Throughout his thirty-six years of military service, Clark was awarded many medals, the Distinguished Service Cross (DSC), the US Army's second-highest decoration, being the most notable.

A legacy of the "Clark Task Force," which he led from 1953 to 1955 to review and to make recommendations on all federal intelligence activities, is the term "intelligence community."

== Early life and career ==
Clark was born in Madison Barracks, Sackets Harbor, New York, on May 1, 1896, but spent much of his youth in Highland Park, Illinois, while his father, Charles Carr Clark, a career infantry officer in the United States Army, was stationed at Fort Sheridan. His mother, Rebecca "Beckie" Ezekkiels, was the daughter of Romanian Jews; Mark Clark was baptized Episcopalian as a cadet at the United States Military Academy at West Point, New York.

Clark gained an early appointment to the USMA in June 1913 at the age of 17, but lost time from frequent illnesses. Known as "Contraband" by his classmates, because of his ability to smuggle sweets into the barracks, while at West Point, he met and befriended Dwight D. Eisenhower, who lived in the same barracks division and was his company cadet sergeant. Although Eisenhower was two years senior to him and had graduated as part of the West Point class of 1915, both formed a friendship. Clark graduated from West Point on 20 April 1917, exactly two weeks after the American entry into World War I, and six weeks before schedule, with a class ranking of 110 in a class of 139, and was commissioned as a second lieutenant in the Infantry Branch. He graduated alongside young men such as Matthew Ridgway, J. Lawton Collins, (both of whom later became U.S. Army Chief of Staff) Ernest N. Harmon, William W. Eagles, Norman Cota, Laurence B. Keiser, John M. Devine, Albert C. Smith, Frederick A. Irving, Charles H. Gerhardt, Bryant Moore and William K. Harrison. All of these men would, like Clark himself, rise to high command and become generals.

== World War I ==
Clark, like his father, decided to join the Infantry Branch. He was assigned to the 11th Infantry Regiment, which later became part of the 5th Division when it was activated in December, where he became a company commander in Company 'K' of the 3rd Battalion, 11th Infantry, with First Lieutenant John W. O'Daniel serving as a platoon commander in his company. In the rapid expansion of the U.S. Army during the war, he rose quickly in rank, promoted to first lieutenant on 15 May and captain on 5 August 1917.

In late April 1918, shortly before Clark's 22nd birthday and over a year after his graduation from West Point, he arrived on the Western Front, to join the American Expeditionary Forces (AEF). Arriving with his company at the French port of Brest on 1 May, his 22nd birthday, the next few weeks were spent in training in trench warfare under the tutelage of the French Army and soon afterwards the division was inspected by General John J. Pershing, the AEF's Commander-in-Chief (C-in-C). Serving in the Vosges mountains, the Commanding Officer (CO) of the regiment's 3rd Battalion, Major R. E. Kingman, fell ill and Clark was promoted to acting battalion commander on 12 June 1918, with O'Daniel taking over command of Clark's company. Two days later, when Clark's division was relieving a French division in the trenches, he was wounded by German artillery in the right shoulder and upper back, knocking him unconscious; the soldier standing next to him, Private Joseph Kanieski, was killed. They were two of the first casualties suffered by the 5th Division during the war.

Captain Clark recovered from his injuries within six weeks, but was graded unfit to return to the infantry, being transferred to the Supply Section of the newly formed First Army. In this position he served with Colonel John L. DeWitt, and supervised the daily provision of food for the men of the First Army, which earned Clark recognition at the higher levels of command. He stayed in this post until the end of hostilities on 11 November 1918. He then served with the Third Army in its occupation duties in Germany and returned to the United States in June 1919, just over a year after he was sent overseas.

== Interwar period ==
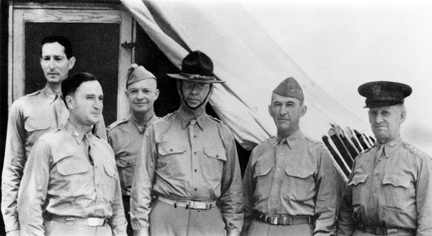
Senior officers during the Louisiana maneuvers. Left to right: Mark W. Clark, Chief of Staff, Army Ground Forces; Harry J. Malony, Chief of Staff, Second Army; Dwight D. Eisenhower, Chief of Staff, Third Army; Ben Lear, Commander Second Army; Walter Krueger, Commander Third Army; Lesley J. McNair, Commander Army Ground Forces

During the interwar period, Clark served in a variety of staff and training roles. From 1921 to 1924, he served as an aide in the office of the Assistant Secretary of War. In 1925, he completed the professional officer's course at the US Army Infantry School and then served as a staff officer with the 30th Infantry Regiment at The Presidio in San Francisco, California. His next assignment was as a training instructor to the Indiana Army National Guard, in which he was promoted to major on 14 January 1933, more than 15 years after his promotion to captain.

Major Clark served as a deputy commander of the Civilian Conservation Corps district in Omaha, Nebraska, in 1935–1936, between tours at the U.S. Army Command and General Staff School in 1935 and the U.S. Army War College in 1937. Among his classmates there were Matthew Ridgway, Walter Bedell Smith and Geoffrey Keyes, all of whom he would serve with during World War II.

Assigned to Fort Lewis, Washington, Clark was selected by General George C. Marshall, the newly promoted Army Chief of Staff, to instruct at the U.S. Army War College in March 1940, where he received a promotion to lieutenant colonel on 1 July. Clark and Brigadier General Lesley J. McNair, later the commander of Army Ground Forces, selected the thousands of acres of unused land in Louisiana for military maneuvers in the Louisiana Maneuvers. On 4 August 1941, Clark, skipping the rank of colonel, was promoted two grades to the temporary rank of brigadier general as the U.S. Army geared up for entry into World War II, and made Assistant Chief of Staff for Operations and Training (G-3) at General Headquarters, United States Army, in Washington, D.C.

== World War II ==
In January 1942, a month after the Japanese attack on Pearl Harbor and the American entry into World War II, Clark was appointed deputy chief of staff of Army Ground Forces (AGF), commanded by Lieutenant General Lesley J. McNair, and in May 1942 became its chief of staff.

=== Service in Europe and North Africa ===
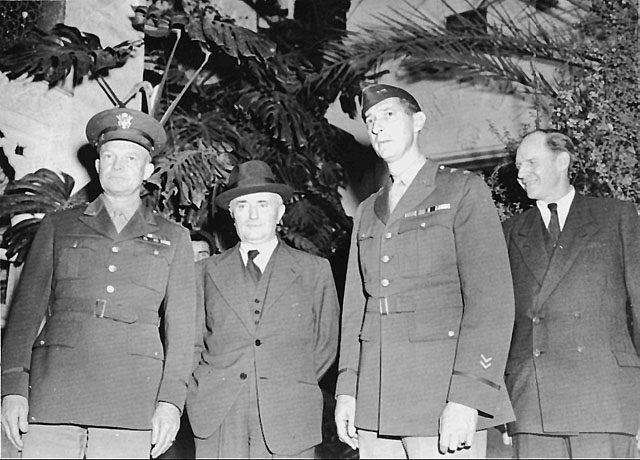
Negotiations at Algiers, 13 November 1942. From left to right: Lieutenant General Dwight D. Eisenhower, Admiral François Darlan, Lieutenant General Mark W. Clark, and Mr. Robert D. Murphy of the US. State Department.

On 17 April 1942, Clark was temporarily promoted to the two-star rank of major general. Two weeks before his 46th birthday he was the youngest major general in the U.S. Army. In June, Clark, along with Major General Dwight Eisenhower, was sent to England as Commanding General (CG) of II Corps, and the next month moved up to CG, Army Forces in the European Theater of Operations (ETO). Along with Eisenhower, he was sent to work out the feasibility of a cross-channel invasion of German-occupied Europe that year, based on the Germany first strategy which had been agreed on by American and British military and political leaders the year before if the United States were to enter the conflict. In England Clark first met the British Prime Minister, Winston Churchill, who was much impressed by Clark, referring to him as "The American Eagle," along with General Sir Alan Brooke, the Chief of the Imperial General Staff (CIGS, the professional head of the British Army), and Lieutenant General Bernard Montgomery, then commander of the South Eastern Command.

After a cross-channel invasion was ruled out for 1942, attention was turned to planning for an Allied invasion of French North Africa, given the codename of Operation Gymnast, later Operation Torch. In October, Clark was assigned to the Mediterranean Theater of Operations (MTO) as deputy to Eisenhower, who was now the Supreme Allied Commander in the theater, relinquishing command of II Corps. Clark's duty was to prepare for Operation Torch. Clark also made a covert visit to French North Africa (see Operation Flagpole) to meet with pro-Allied officers of the Vichy French forces.

=== Fifth Army and service in Italy ===
Eisenhower greatly appreciated Clark's contributions. Clark, at the age of 46, was promoted to the temporary rank of lieutenant general on 11 November 1942, three days after the Torch landings, making him the youngest three-star general in the U.S. Army.

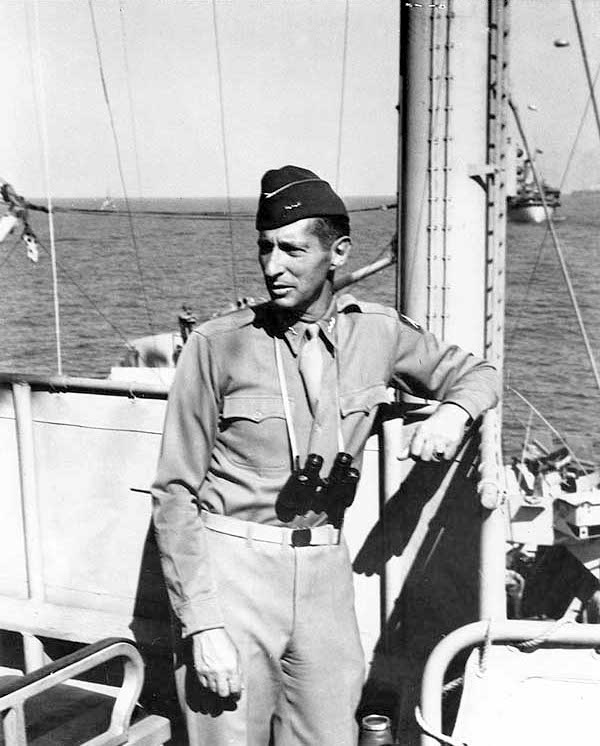
Clark on board USS Ancon during the landings at Salerno, Italy, 12 September 1943

On 5 January 1943, the United States created its first field army overseas, the Fifth Army, with Clark as its CG, although neither Clark nor Fifth Army saw service in the fighting in North Africa. Many officers, most notably Major General George S. Patton Jr., who was both older and senior to Clark, and was then commanding I Armored Corps, came to resent him, believing he had advanced too quickly. Patton, in particular, believed Clark was "too damned slick" and believed Clark was much too concerned with himself.

General Dwight D. Eisenhower, Supreme Commander of Allied Forces, confers with Lt. General Mark W. Clark in Italy, October 1943.

In the presence of senior commanders Patton and Clark were friendly, although Patton, in his journal, wrote "I think that if you treat a skunk nicely, he will not piss on you—as often", referring to Clark after both he and General Marshall, the Army Chief of Staff, visited Patton's headquarters as the latter explained his plans for the upcoming invasion of Sicily. Clark, for his part, claimed he found it difficult to command men who had been his senior, and he proved reluctant to remove those commanders if they failed in battle. The Fifth Army's initial mission was preparing to keep a surveillance on Spanish Morocco.

His permanent rank was upgraded to brigadier general on 1 September 1943.

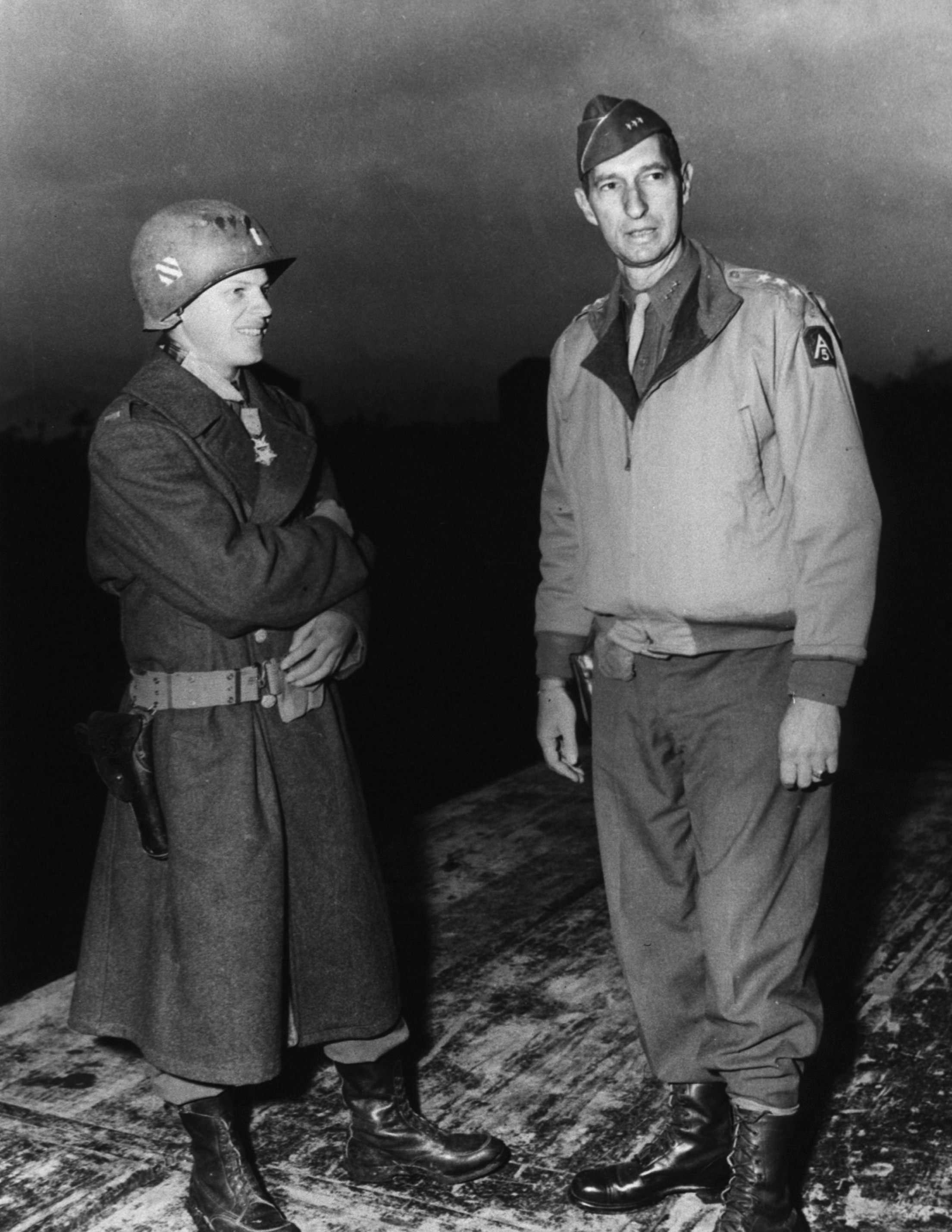
Lieutenant David C. Waybur (left) chats with Lieutenant General Mark W. Clark who presented him with the Medal of Honor for his conspicuous gallantry under fire, Baia e Latina, Italy, 29 November 1943

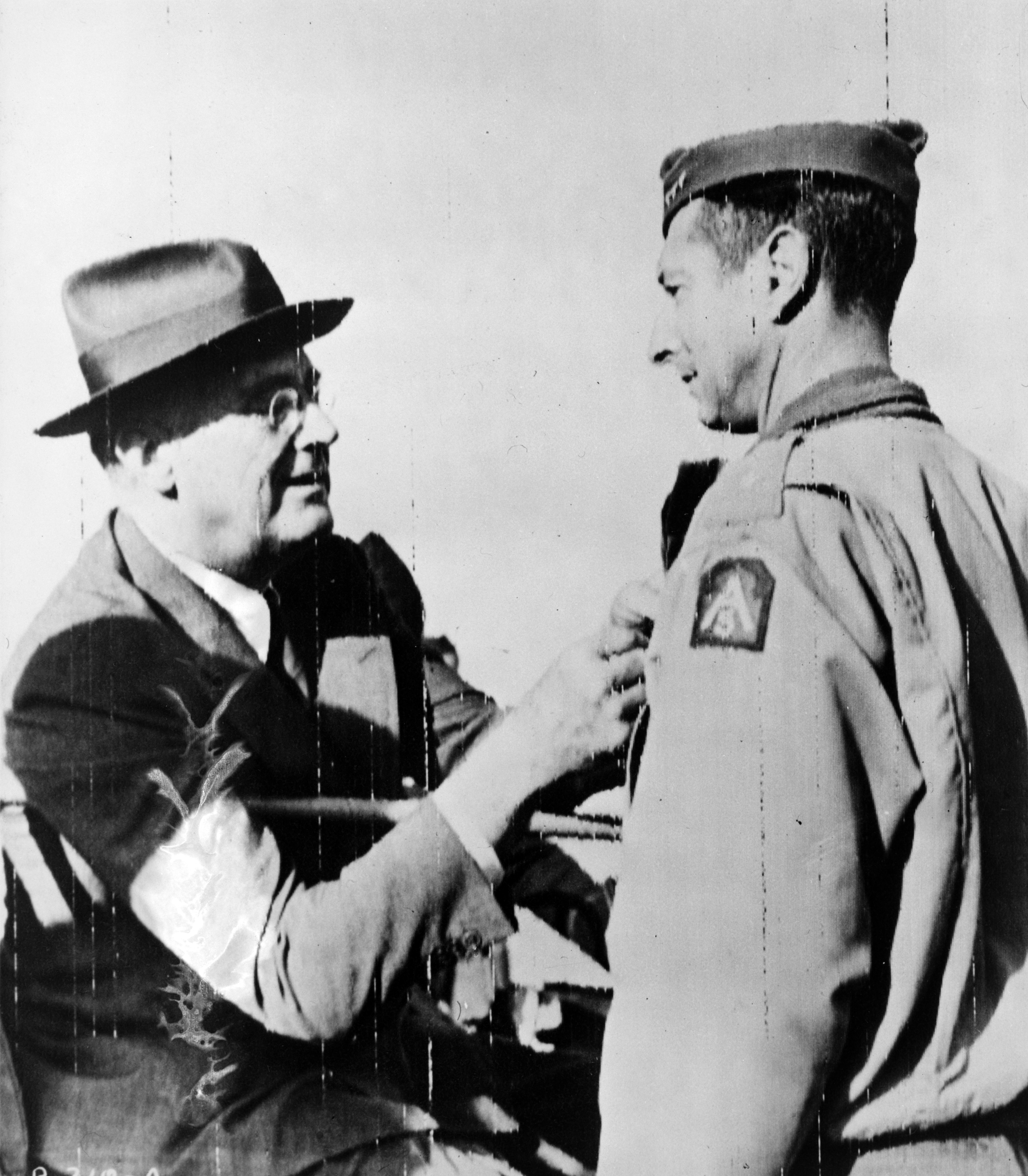
Clark being awarded the Distinguished Service Cross by President Franklin D. Roosevelt in Castelvetrano, Sicily, Italy, 13 December 1943

On 9 September 1943, the Fifth Army, composed of the U.S. VI Corps, under Major General Ernest J. Dawley—who was a decade older than Clark and about whom Clark had doubts—and the British X Corps, under Lieutenant General Sir Richard L. McCreery—to whom Clark later scornfully referred as a "feather duster"—under Clark's command landed at Salerno (codenamed Operation Avalanche).

The invasion, despite good initial progress, was nearly defeated over the next few days by numerous German counterattacks, and Major General Dawley, the VI Corps commander, was sacked and replaced by Major General John P. Lucas, who himself was later sacked and replaced after his perceived failure during Operation Shingle. The situation was serious for many days and it became obvious that things were not going to schedule. Clark was subsequently criticized by historians and critics for this near-failure, blamed on poor planning by Clark and his staff. Despite this Clark was later awarded the Distinguished Service Cross (DSC), the citation for which reads:

The President of the United States of America, authorized by Act of Congress 9 July 1918, takes pleasure in presenting the Distinguished Service Cross to Lieutenant General Mark Wayne Clark (ASN: 0–5309), United States Army, for extraordinary heroism in connection with military operations against an armed enemy while Commanding the 5th Army, in action against enemy forces on 14 September 1943 at Salerno, when the FIFTH Army's bridgehead was threatened by an enemy counterattack. General Clark personally instilled determination and courage in his men, under artillery and machine gun fire at the front line. He discovered 18 Nazi tanks approaching, located an anti-tank unit and gave the orders which brought about the destruction of six tanks and the repulse of the rest. By his magnificent display of leadership, courage and determination during a critical phase of the battle, front line troops were inspired to hold at all costs and subsequently to initiate steady advance. Lieutenant General Clark's intrepid actions, personal bravery and zealous devotion to duty exemplify the highest traditions of the military forces of the United States and reflect great credit upon himself, the 5th Army, and the United States Army.

The Fifth Army, by now composed of five American divisions (the 3rd, 34th, 36th and 45th Infantry, along with the 82nd Airborne) and three British divisions (7th Armoured, 46th and 56th Infantry, all serving under McCreery's X Corps), operating alongside the British Eighth Army, under General Bernard Montgomery, subsequently advanced up the spine of Italy, and captured the Italian city of Naples on 1 October 1943, and crossed the Volturno Line in mid-October. Progress, however, soon began to slow down, due to German resistance, lack of Allied manpower in Italy, and the formidable German defenses known as the Winter Line, which held the Allies up for the next six months.

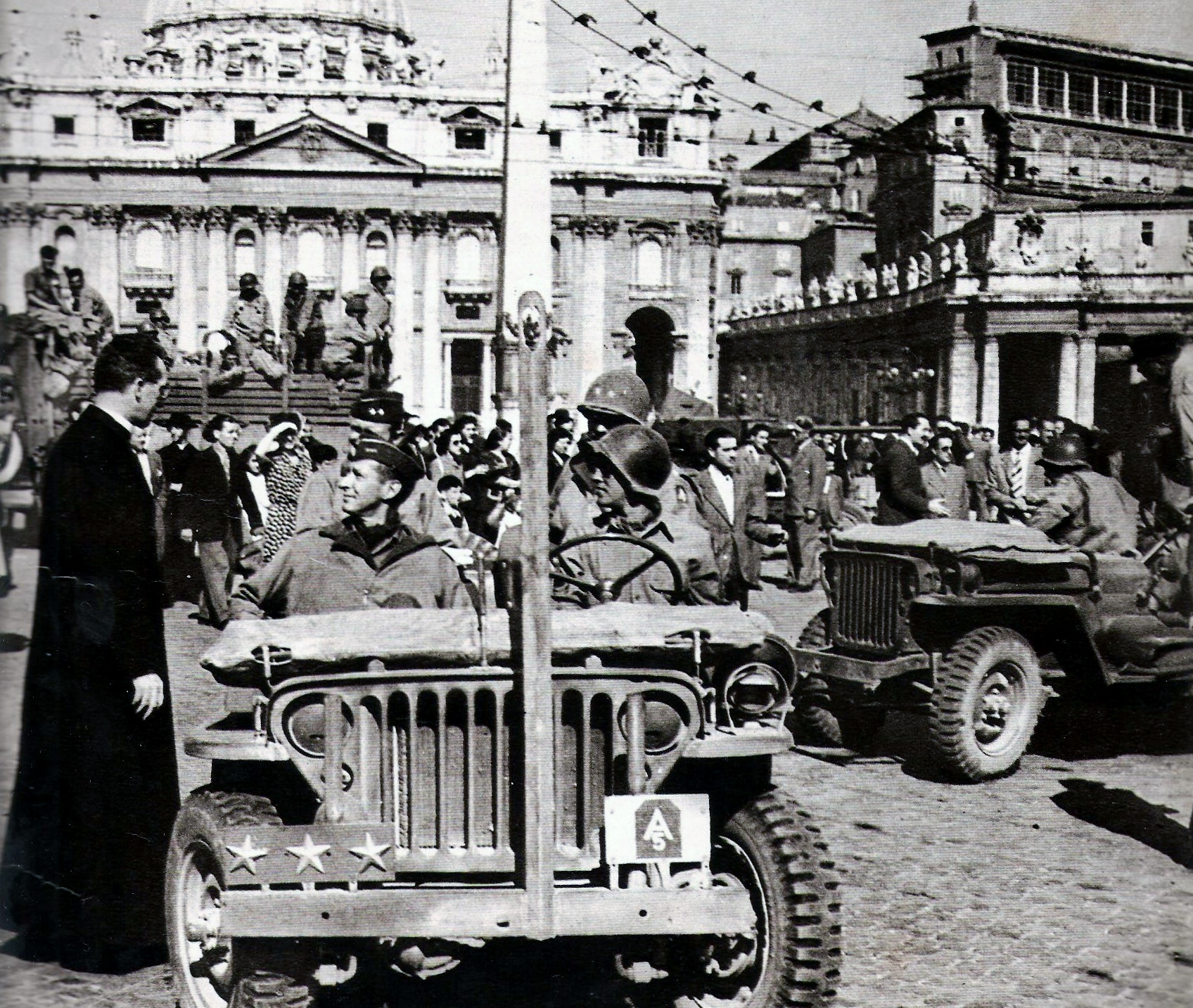
Lieutenant General Mark W. Clark riding in a jeep through the recently liberated Italian capital of Rome, June 1944. Sat behind Clark is Major General Alfred Gruenther while to Gruenther's left is Major General Harry H. Johnson.

During the Battle of Monte Cassino, Clark ordered the bombing of the Abbey on 15 February 1944. This was under direct orders from his superior, British General Sir Harold R. L. G. Alexander, Commander-in-Chief (C-in-C) of the Allied Armies in Italy (AAI). Clark and his chief of staff, Major General Alfred Gruenther, remained unconvinced of the military necessity of the bombing. When handing over the U.S. II Corps position to the New Zealand Corps, under Lieutenant General Sir Bernard Freyberg, the assistant division commander of the U.S. 34th Division, Brigadier General Frederic B. Butler, claimed "I don't know, but I don't believe the enemy is in the convent. All the fire has been from the slopes of the hill below the wall." The commander of the veteran 4th Indian Infantry Division (which was transferred from the Eighth Army to Clark's Fifth Army), Major General Francis Tuker, urged the bombing of the entire massif with the heaviest bombs available. Clark finally pinned down the British commander-in-chief in Italy, Alexander, recounting that "I said, 'You give me a direct order and we'll do it' and he did."

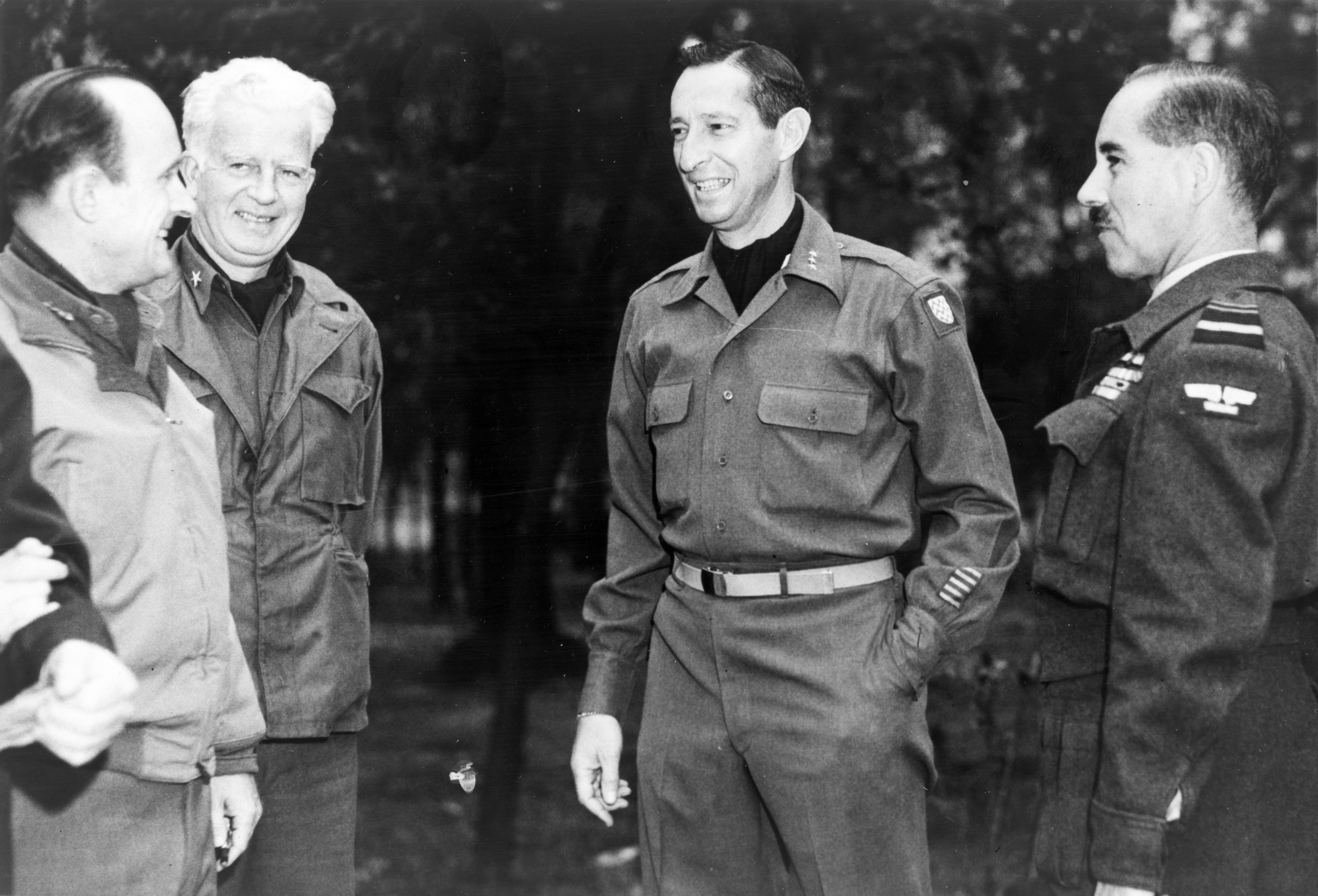
From left to right, Alfred Gruenther, Donald W. Brann, Mark W. Clark, and Guy Garrod

Clark's conduct of operations in the Italian campaign is controversial, particularly during the actions around the German Gustav Line, such as the U.S. 36th Infantry Division's assault on the Gari river in January 1944, which failed with 1,681 casualties in the 36th Infantry Division. American military historian Carlo D'Este called Clark's choice to take the undefended Italian capital of Rome, after Operation Diadem and the breakout from the Anzio beachhead, in early June, rather than focusing on the destruction of the German 10th Army, "as militarily stupid as it was insubordinate". Although Clark described a "race to Rome" and released an edited version of his diary for the official historians, his complete papers became available only after his death. James Holland in his book Cassino '44 argues that by turning to face Armeeoberkommando (AOK) 14 at the Caesar Line head-on Clark almost certainly destroyed more of AOK 14 than he would have done otherwise. Rather than annihilating AOK 10, as has been Alexander's original plan, the Allies seriously mauled the former and virtually annihilated the latter. On balance, that was a better outcome than had been originally envisioned. It is unfair to suggest that the Allies failed to annihilate AOK 10 south of Rome because of Clark's decision to change his line of attack, and it is a myth that seems to have originated with Raleigh Trevelyan, a former British second lieutenant who had served in Anzio and wrote a book in 1981 called Rome '44. In it, Trevelyan cited a claim by Harold Macmillan than Alexander had been furious when he'd heard that Clark had turned away from Valmontone. This single quote had been repeated by almost every historian who has written about this period over the course of the intervening year. There is no footnote for the source of this quote. In any case, Clark did send troops to Valmontone, it was captured, US forces did use the Via Casilina to advance on Rome and the city fell before D-Day. It was just that no German troops were cut off here, - because none of them were using it as a route of escape.

One of Clark's commanders, Lucian Truscott wrote that on receiving new orders from Clark to turn towards Rome

...I was dumbfounded. This was no time to drive to the north-west where the enemy was still strong; we should pour our maximum power into the Valmontone Gap to ensure the destruction of the retreating German Army. I would not comply with the order without first talking to General Clark in person. ... [However] he was not on the beachhead and could not be reached even by radio... such was the order that turned the main effort of the beachhead forces from the Valmontone Gap and prevented destruction of the German Tenth Army. On the 26th the order was put into effect.

He went on to write,

There has never been any doubt in my mind that had General Clark held loyally to General Alexander's instructions, had he not changed the direction of my attack to the north-west on 26 May, the strategic objectives of Anzio would have been accomplished in full. To be first in Rome was a poor compensation for this lost opportunity.

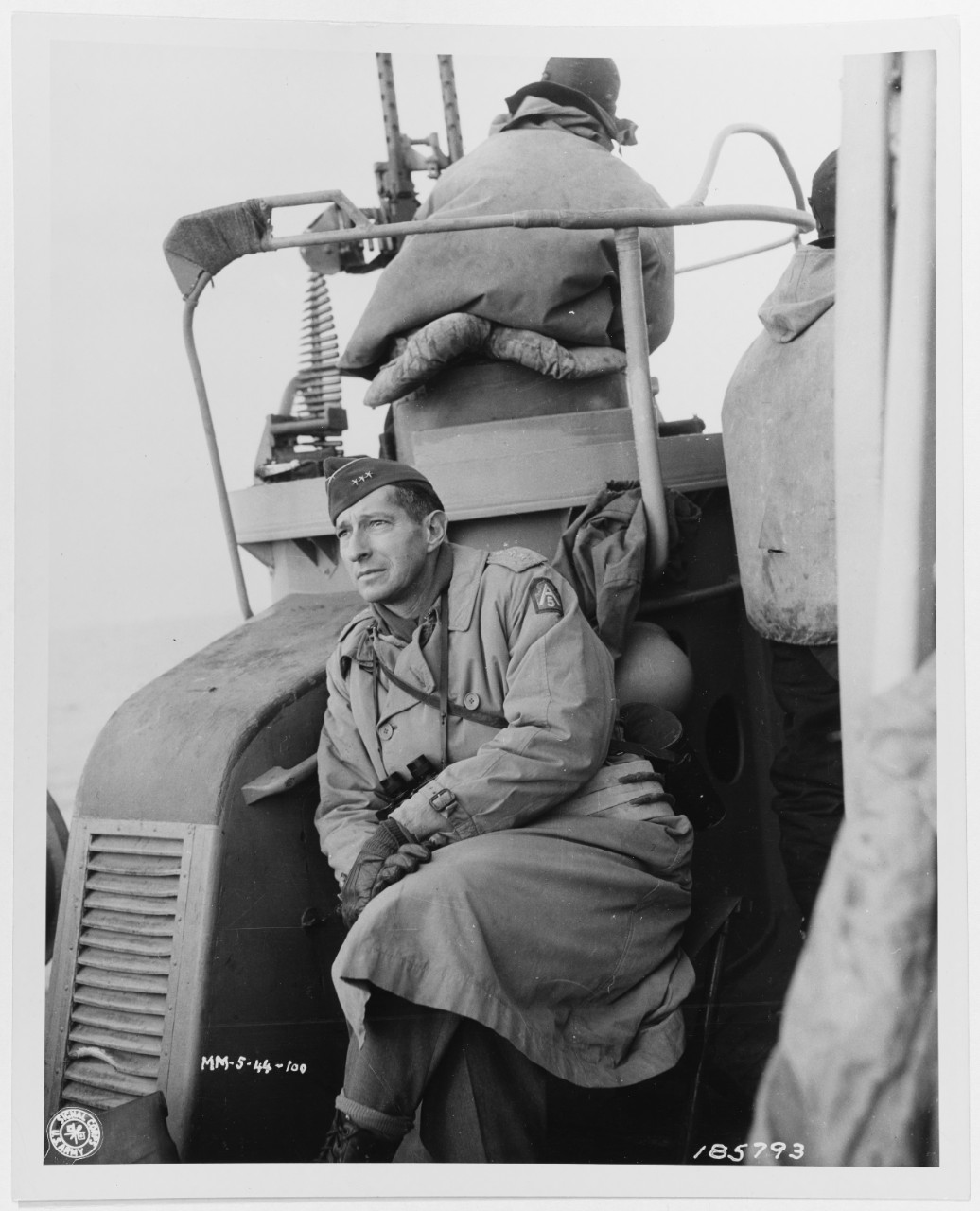
Lieutenant General Mark W. Clark looks toward the shoreline from the PT boat carrying him to the beachhead near Anzio, Italy, 22 January 1944

Clark led the Fifth Army, now much reduced in manpower, having given up both the U.S. VI Corps and the French Expeditionary Corps (CEF) for Operation Dragoon, the Allied invasion of Southern France (which Clark had always opposed), throughout the battles around the Gothic Line. For the offensive, Clark's Fifth Army (now composed only of the II Corps—with the 34th and 85th Infantry Divisions—under Major General Geoffrey Keyes, and the IV Corps—with the 88th and 91st Infantry Divisions—under Major General Willis D. Crittenberger and the 1st Armored Division in reserve) was reinforced by the British XIII Corps, under Lieutenant General Sidney Kirkman. The initial stages went well until the autumn weather began and, as it did the previous year, the advance bogged down.

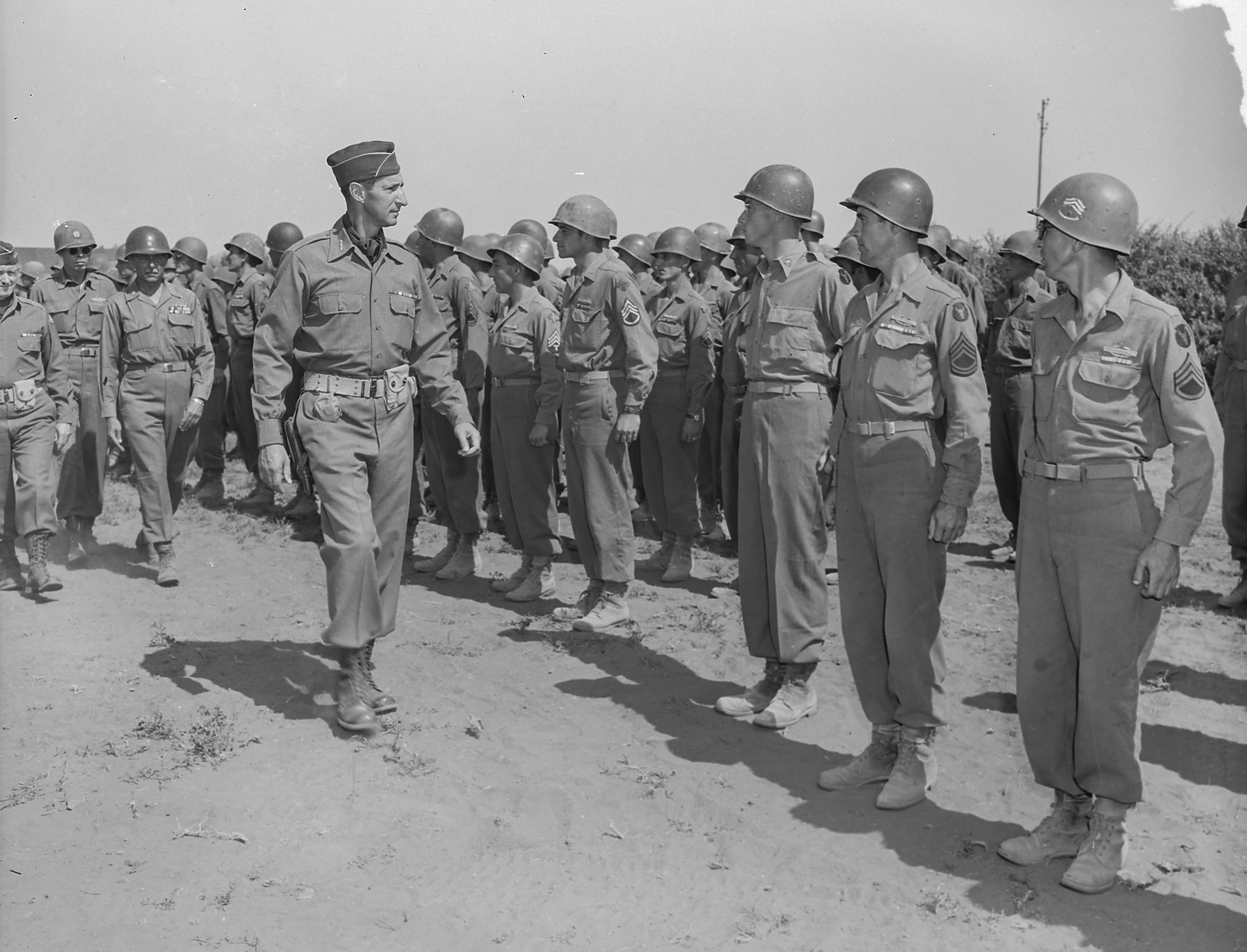
Lieutenant General Mark W. Clark inspecting members of the 34th Infantry Division of the II Corps, shortly after the liberation of Rome, June 1944

Early on the morning of 28 January 1944, a PT boat carrying Clark to the Anzio beachhead, six days after the Anzio landings, was mistakenly fired on by U.S. naval vessels. Several sailors were killed and wounded around him. Next month, during the air raid he ordered on Monte Cassino abbey, 16 bombs were mistakenly dropped at the Fifth Army headquarters compound then 17 miles (27 km) away from there, exploding yards from his trailer while he was at his desk inside. A few months later, on 10 June, he again narrowly escaped death when, while flying over Civitavecchia in a Stinson L-5, his pilot, Major John T. Walker, failed to see the cable of a barrage balloon, which embedded itself into one of the wings, forcing the plane into a rapid downward spiral around the cable. The plane broke free after the third time around, leaving the outer section of the wing behind. Miraculously, Walker managed to crash-land in an open meadow and the two men escaped uninjured. "I never had a worse experience" wrote Clark to his wife.

=== 15th Army Group ===
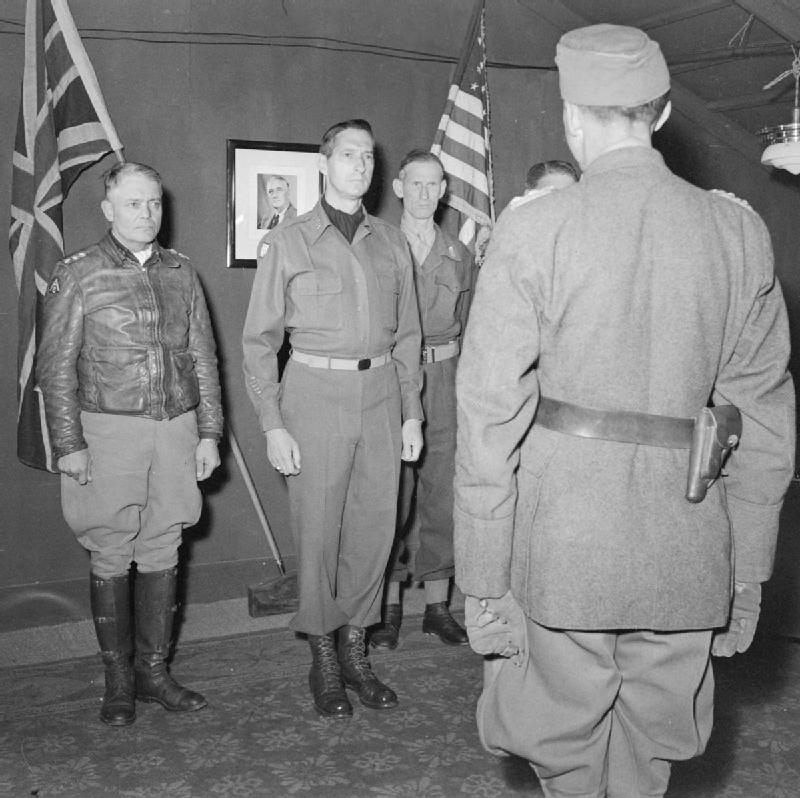
Generalleutnant Fridolin von Senger und Etterlin (foreground), the commander of XIV Panzer Corps, meets (from left to right:) Lieutenant General Lucian K. Truscott Jr., General Clark, and Lieutenant General Sir Richard McCreery at 15th Army Group Headquarters, where the Germans received instructions regarding the unconditional surrender of German forces in Italy and West Austria, May 1945

In December 1944 Clark succeeded Alexander as commander of the AAI, renamed the 15th Army Group, and Alexander was made the Supreme Commander of the AFHQ in the Mediterranean, replacing Field Marshal Sir Henry Maitland Wilson, who himself was called to Washington to replace Field Marshal Sir John Dill as head of the British Joint Chiefs of Staff. Succeeding Clark as commander of the Fifth Army was Lieutenant General Lucian Truscott, who had previously commanded VI Corps and, before that, the 3rd Division. Clark was promoted to the four-star rank of acting general on 10 March 1945, aged 48, the youngest in the United States Army. His permanent rank was upgraded to major general on 7 October 1944.

Clark led the 15th Army Group throughout the final months of the Italian campaign, although no major offensives took place, due mainly to a critical shortage of manpower throughout the ranks of both the Fifth and Eighth Armies along with the worsening winter weather.

After much retraining and reorganizing, Clark then led the army group in the final offensive in Italy, codenamed Operation Grapeshot, which brought the war in Italy to an end, and he afterwards accepted the German surrender in Italy in May and became Commander of the Allied Forces in Italy at the end of World War II in Europe.

== Cold War ==
Later in 1945, as Commander in Chief of US Forces of Occupation in Austria, Clark gained experience negotiating with communists, which he would put to good use a few years later. Clark served as deputy to the US Secretary of State in 1947 and attended the negotiations for an Austrian treaty with the Council of Foreign Ministers in London and Moscow. In June 1947, Clark returned home and assumed command of the Sixth Army, headquartered at the Presidio in San Francisco and two years later was named chief of Army Field Forces. On 20 October 1951, he was nominated by President Harry S Truman to be the US emissary to the Holy See. Clark withdrew his nomination on 13 January 1952, after protests from Texas Senator Tom Connally and from Protestant groups.

=== Congressional inquiry ===
It was announced on 20 January 1946 that the 36th Infantry Division Veterans' Association had unanimously called for a congressional inquiry into Clark's actions during the 36th Infantry Division's disastrous crossing of the Gari River (erroneously identified as the Rapido) on the night of 20 January 1944. The petition read:

Be it resolved, that the men of the 36th Division Association petition the Congress of the United States to investigate the river Rapido fiasco and take the necessary steps to correct a military system that will permit an inefficient and inexperienced officer, such as General Mark W. Clark, in a high command to destroy the young manhood of this country and to prevent future soldiers being sacrificed wastefully and uselessly.

Two resolutions were heard in the House of Representatives, one of which claimed the incident was "one of the most colossal blunders of the Second World War... a murderous blunder" that "every man connected with this undertaking knew... was doomed to failure."

Clark was absolved of blame by the House of Representatives but never commented on the Rapido River episode.

=== Korean War and Japan ===
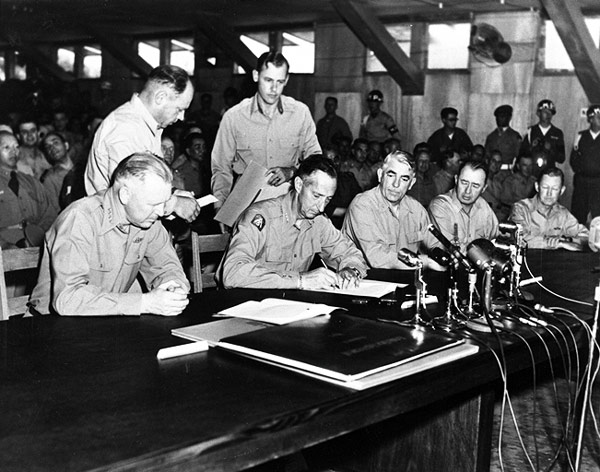
Clark signing the Korean Armistice Agreement on 27 July 1953

During the Korean War, he took over as commander of the United Nations Command on 12 May 1952, succeeding General Matthew Ridgway, a close friend and a fellow graduate of the West Point class of 1917. Clark commanded the UN forces in Korea until the armistice was signed by others and him on 27 July 1953. He also served as Commander of the Far East Command in Tokyo overseeing all U.S. forces in Japan. He retained his position as FEC commander and governor of the Ryukyu Islands until 7 October, when he was succeeded by John E. Hull. Clark formally retired from the Army on 31 October.

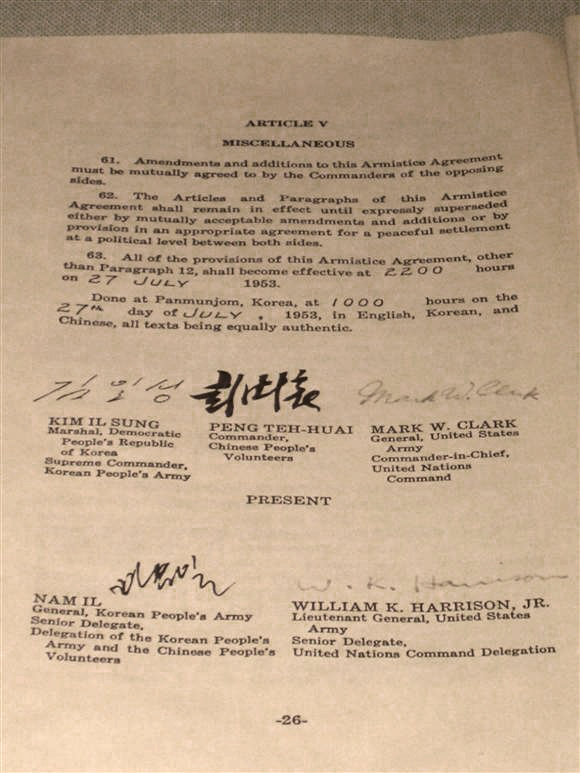
Clark's signature on the Korean Armistice Agreement

=== Post-Army career ===
From 1954 to 1965, after retiring from the Army, Clark served as president of The Citadel, the Military College of South Carolina in Charleston.

From 1954 to 1955, Clark was head of the Clark Task Force to study and make recommendations on all intelligence activities of the Federal government. The task force had been created in 1953 by the second Commission on Organization of the Executive Branch of the Government, or the Hoover Commission, which had been chaired by Herbert Hoover.

Members of the Clark Task Force were Admiral Richard L. Conolly, a former Deputy Chief of Naval Operations; Ernest F. Hollings, the speaker pro tempore of South Carolina's House of Representatives; California businessman Henry Kearns; Edward V. Rickenbacker, World War I flying ace and president of Eastern Air Lines; and Donald S. Russell, a former Assistant Secretary of State. The staff director was Major General James G. Christiansen. The task force first met in early November 1954 and in May 1955 submitted a top-secret report for the president and another that was unclassified for the Hoover Commission and Congress. The Clark task force coined the term Intelligence Community to describe "the machinery for accomplishing our intelligence objectives."

Clark wrote two memoirs: Calculated Risk (1950) and From the Danube to the Yalu (1954). His wife, Maurine, also wrote a memoir: Captain's Bride, General's Lady (1956).

In 1962, Clark was elected an honorary member of the South Carolina Society of the Cincinnati in recognition of his outstanding service to his country.

== Retirement and death ==
General Clark retired in 1965 when he stepped down as president of The Citadel. He lived in Charleston, South Carolina, in retirement and died there on April 17, 1984, at age 87. He was the last surviving American officer who had held four-star rank during World War II. He was buried on the campus of The Citadel.

== Racial views ==
He associated un-Americanism and communism with unassimilated immigrants, whose "less desirable qualities of their former nationalities" had not been erased by the "melting pot." He said World War I had provided the country with a valuable lesson on "undigested groups" with "no knowledge of and respect for American institutions." At the same time, Clark was an ardent Germanophobe who thought Nazi war crimes reflected the inherent "cruelty ... of the German people." At one point, he said U.S. troops had to abandon "soft ideas of sportsmanship and fair play" when fighting Germany.

"Our men must kill Germans as they would kill rattlesnakes or scorpions."

== Major assignments ==
- Deputy Commander, Allied Force Headquarters – October 1942 to 4 January 1943
- Commanding General, Fifth Army – 5 January 1943 to 15 December 1944
- Commanding General, 15th Army Group – 16 December 1944 to 26 June 1945
- Commander, US Occupation Forces in Austria – 27 June 1945 to June 1947
- Commanding General, Sixth Army – June 1947 to 30 September 1949
- Chief, Army Field Forces – 1 October 1949 to 5 May 1952
- Commander in Chief, United Nations Command in Korea – 12 May 1952 to 7 October 1953
- Commander in Chief, Far East Command – 12 May 1952 to 7 October 1953

== Awards and decorations ==
Distinguished Service Cross
Army Distinguished Service Medal with three oak leaf clusters
Navy Distinguished Service Medal
Legion of Merit
Bronze Star Medal
Purple Heart
World War I Victory Medal
Army of Occupation of Germany Medal
American Defense Service Medal
European-African-Middle Eastern Campaign Medal with 7 campaign stars
World War II Victory Medal
Army of Occupation Medal
National Defense Service Medal
Korean Service Medal with 3 campaign stars
Légion d'honneur, Grand Cross (France)
Order of the White Lion, First Class (Czechoslovak Socialist Republic)
Order of Saints Maurice and Lazarus, Grand Cross (Italy)
Military Order of Savoy, Grand Cross (Italy)
Order of Ouissam Alaouite, Grand Cross – First Class (Morocco)
Order of Suvorov First Class (Union of Soviet Socialist Republics)
Knight Commander of the Order of the Bath (United Kingdom)
Knight Commander of the Order of the British Empire (United Kingdom)
Order of the Crown, Grand Officer (Belgium)
Order of the Southern Cross, Grand Officer (Brazil)
Order of Military Merit, Great Officer (Brazil)
Medaglia d'Argento (Italy)
Order Wojenny Virtuti Militari, Krzyż Srebrny/Silver Cross (Poland)
United Nations Service Medal

== Dates of rank ==
Insignia	Rank	Component	Date
No insignia	Cadet	United States Military Academy	14 June 1913
	Second lieutenant	Regular Army	20 April 1917
	First lieutenant	Regular Army	15 May 1917
	Captain	National Army	5 August 1917
	Captain	Regular Army	7 November 1919
	Major	Regular Army	14 January 1933
	Lieutenant colonel	Regular Army	1 July 1940
	Brigadier general	Army of the United States	4 August 1941
	Major general	Army of the United States	17 April 1942
	Lieutenant general	Army of the United States	11 November 1942
	Brigadier general	Regular Army	14 September 1943
	Major general	Regular Army	7 October 1944
	General	Army of the United States	10 March 1945
	General	Retired list	31 October 1953

== Personal life ==
Clark married Maurine Doran, daughter of Mr. and Mrs. M. A. Doran of Muncie, Ind., 17 May 1924. Mrs. Clark died 5 October 1966. Their son was Maj. William Doran Clark, U.S.A. (Ret.), and their daughter Patricia Ann (Mrs. Gordon H. Oosting). Later in life he married Mary Dean. Patricia Ann did not have any children. William had 5 children: Louise Clark Goddard, Doran Clark Abrams, D'Wayne Clark Waterman, Helen Clark Atkeson, and Larry Clark.

Mark W. Clark was initiated to the Scottish Rite Freemasonry in the Mystic Tie Lodge No. 398, Indianapolis, IN, receiving the 33rd and highest degree.

== Legacy ==
An interstate spur (I-526) in the suburbs of Charleston, South Carolina, was named Mark Clark Expressway in his honor.

Mark Clark Hall on the campus of The Citadel in Charleston, South Carolina, is named in General Clark's honor.

The General Mark W. Clark National Guard Armory in North Charleston, South Carolina, is named in Clark's honor.

From 1949 to August 17, 2010, the Mark Clark Bridge in Washington connected Camano Island with the adjacent town of Stanwood on the mainland. It was then superseded by the Camano Gateway Bridge, and the Mark Clark Bridge was demolished the following month.

Fort Drum's Clark Hall is named after him. Fort Drum is near Clark's Madison Barracks birthplace, and Clark Hall is used for administrative in processing and out-processing soldiers assigned to the 10th Mountain Division.

The term "intelligence community" was created by the federal intelligence-review "Clark Task Force," which he headed from 1953 to 1955. The term remains in use by the US government and by civilians.

He was used in the 1979 novel Kane and Abel as the reason for the Abel character going to World War II.

Two locations in the Brazilian state of Rio de Janeiro—the Academia Militar das Agulhas Negras in Resende, and a street in São Gonçalo—have been named after Clark.

The Agulhas Negras Military Academy Stadium, Brazil (AMAN), is named General Mark Clark.

In the neighborhood of Santa Catarina, in the city of São Gonçalo, located in the State of Rio de Janeiro – Brazil, there is a street called Gen. Mark Clark.

In the city of Salerno, in Italy, there is a street called Via Generale Clark.

== In film ==
Clark was portrayed by Michael Rennie in the 1968 film The Devil's Brigade. The film is about the exploits of the 1st Special Service Force, commanded by Colonel Robert T. Frederick, which came under Clark's command in the Italian Campaign.

Clark was portrayed by Robert Ryan in the 1968 war film Anzio, under the pseudonym “General Carson”.

Clark was portrayed by William Schallert in the 1979 television miniseries Ike: The War Years.

General Clark was referred to in the television series M*A*S*H, season 11, episode 3: "Foreign Affairs". In the episode, he created a program that awarded an enemy soldier $100,000 and U.S. citizenship for landing an enemy plane in friendly territory and surrendering.

== Notes ==
Military offices
Preceded by Newly activated organization	Commanding General II Corps; June – October 1942	Succeeded by Lloyd Fredendall
Preceded by Newly activated organization	Commanding General Fifth Army; 1943–1944	Succeeded by Lucian Truscott
Preceded by Sir Harold Alexander	Commanding General Fifteenth Army Group; 1944–1945	Succeeded by Position abolished
Preceded by George Price Hays	Commanding General Sixth Army; 1947–1949	Succeeded by Albert Coady Wedemeyer
Preceded by Matthew Ridgway	Supreme Commander, United Nations Command; 1952–1953	Succeeded by John E. Hull
