= II Corps (United States) =

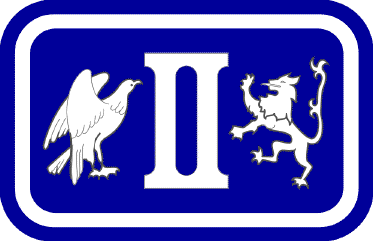
- Shoulder sleeve insignia of the II Corps.
- Active: 24 February 1918 – 1 February 1919 (U.S. Army); 29 July 1921 – 15 August 1927 (U.S. National Guard); 15 August 1927 (U.S. Army); 1 August 1940 – 10 October 1945; 2 January 1958 – 5 June 1970
- Country: United States of America
- Branch: United States Army
- Role: Headquarters
- Size: Corps
- Garrison/HQ: Camp Kilmer, New Jersey (after 1958)
- Engagements: World War I; Somme Offensive; World War II; Algeria- French Morocco (with arrowhead); Tunisia; Sicily (with arrowhead); Naples-Foggia; Rome-Arno; North Apennines; Po Valley

Commanders
- Notable commanders: Mark W. Clark; Lloyd Fredendall; George S. Patton; Omar Bradley

Insignia
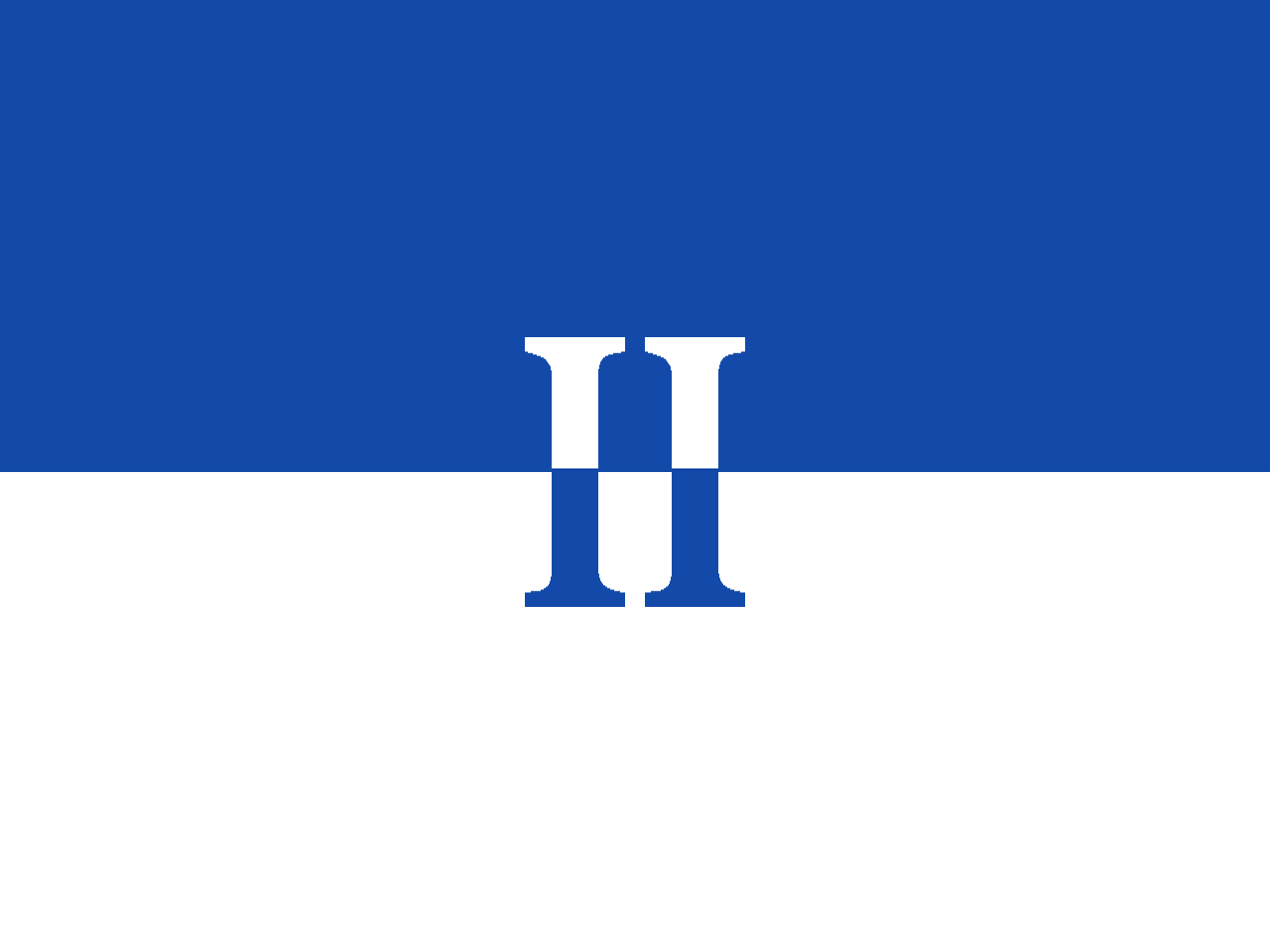
- II Corps Flag

The II Corps was a corps-sized formation of the United States Army that was active in both World War I and World War II. It was originally formed and fought on the Western Front during World War I and was also the first American formation of any size to see combat in North Africa or Europe during World War II.

== History ==
=== World War I ===
II Corps was organized on 24 February 1918. Initially it consisted of the 27th, 30th, 33rd, 78th and 80th Divisions.

In June 1918, the individual divisions of II Corps, which was commanded by Major General George W. Read, were assigned to British and Australian corps for familiarization training. On 4 July, elements of the 33rd Division (Major General George Bell Jr.) took part in the Battle of Hamel, while attached to the Australian Corps. (The Australian commander, General Sir John Monash, was said to have deliberately chosen the date as a gesture and motivator to the American infantry attached to his corps.) Individual platoons, from four companies of the 131st Infantry and 132nd Infantry, were distributed among Australian battalions, to gain combat experience. This, however, occurred without official approval as there was controversy regarding the battlefield command of US troops by junior officers from other countries. Thus, while Hamel was a relatively minor battle by the standards of World War I, it was historically significant as the first major offensive operation during the war to involve US infantry, the first occasion on which US units fought alongside British Empire forces, and a demonstration that the previously inexperienced American troops could play an effective role in the war. The battle was also historically significant for the use of innovative assault tactics devised by the Australian general John Monash. As a result of Pershing's dissatisfaction with the use of US troops the 78th and 80th Divisions were reassigned on 18 August. On 23 August 1918 the 33rd Division was moved to the Toul sector. This left just the 27th and 30th Divisions in II US Corps assigned to support the British Expeditionary Force if required. The Divisional artillery brigades of these divisions were also removed and on operations these divisions were supported by Australian or British artillery.

It first saw significant action in Europe in August 1918, in the Hundred Days Offensive, as part of the British Third Army. The 33rd Division was in reserve behind the British 4th Army at the opening of the August offensive. With the British III Corps attack stalling on the Chipilly Spur feature the 131st Regiment of the 33rd Division was sent to assist on 9 August, which it did with distinction. The following day the Regiment was attached to the 4th Australian Division and remained there until 12 August. From 12 August until 20 August it was combined with the 13th Australian Brigade in what was called the Liaison Force commanded by Brigadier General E A Wisdom. This was designed to hold the front from the Somme to the Bray-Sur-Somme-Corbie road to relieve the 4th Australian Division from the operation. After this it returned to the 33rd US Division. Advances made during a secondary assault by the Australian Corps (Battle of Albert) on 21–23 August, were exploited by the Allies in the Second Battle of the Somme. This pushed the German 2nd Army back along a 50-mile (80 km) front line. British and US units advanced on Arras. On 29 August, Bapaume fell to the New Zealand Division and other elements of the British IV Corps. This allowed the Australian Corps to cross the Somme River on 31 August and break the German lines in the Battle of Mont St. Quentin.

During late September 1918, with two Army National Guard Divisions (27th and 30th, less their artillery) under command, II Corps was attached to the Australian Corps as part of British Fourth Army. The Corps was involved in the Battle of St Quentin Canal, during which it suffered heavy losses. The II Corps HQ took over the front from 6 October 1918 relieving the Australian Corps. In turn it was relieved in the line on 20 October by the IX British Corps. Its Organization for this phase was: 27th Division, 30th Division, 301 US Tank Battalion (Mk V tanks) Attached troops 3 Squadron Australian Flying Corps, VII Corps RA (British), VII Corps HA (British), 4th Tank Bde (British), 1st Tank Bn (Mark V Star), 4th Tank Bn (Mark V). The 301 US Tank battalion remained in support of the British 1st and 6th Divisions until 25 October.

II Corps was demobilized 1 February 1919.

=== Interwar years ===
==== II Corps (I) ====
As part of the National Defense Act of 1920, II Corps was constituted in the National on 29 July 1921, allotted to the state of New York, and assigned to the First Army. The headquarters and headquarters company (HHC) were placed on the Deferred List on 2 July 1923 and transferred to the Organized Reserve as a Deferred National Guard unit. The headquarters was initiated in late 1923 with Reserve personnel at 39 Whitehall Street, New York City, New York. HHC, II Corps was withdrawn on 15 August 1927 from the N.G. and demobilized. Concurrently, O.R. personnel were relieved from assignment.

==== Army reorganization ====
As part of an Army reorganization beginning in August 1927 that grouped the new XX, XXI, and XXII Corps, organized in the Regular Army, under the new Seventh Army, also a Regular formation and the successor of the old First Army, as a contingency force staffed by professional soldiers rather than reservists that could immediately take control of forces and respond to any emergency, the II Corps HHC were withdrawn from the Organized Reserve and demobilized on 15 August 1927. Concurrently, all Reserve personnel were relieved from assignment. Less than two months later, however, the Seventh Army was redesignated the new First Army, and the XX, XXI, and XXII Corps as the new I, II, and III Corps, respectively.

==== II Corps (II) ====
The second iteration of the II Corps was constituted in the Regular Army as HHC, XXI Corps on 15 August 1927, allotted to the Second Corps Area, and assigned to the Seventh Army. Redesignated HHC, II Corps on 13 October 1927 and concurrently assigned to the First Army. The designated headquarters location for peacetime organization purposes was New York City. On 1 October 1933, the corps headquarters was partially activated at Fort Jay, NY, with Regular Army personnel from Headquarters, Second Corps Area and Reserve personnel from the corps area at large. Though a "Regular Army Inactive" unit from 1933 to 1940, the corps headquarters was organized provisionally for short periods using its assigned Reserve officers and staff officers from Headquarters, Second Corps Area. These periods of provisional Active Duty were generally for CPXs and major maneuvers such as the First Army Maneuvers in 1935, 1939, and 1940. The II Corps headquarters was fully activated on 1 August 1940, less Reserve personnel, at Fort Jay, and assumed command and control of the 1st, 27th, and 44th Divisions for participation in the 1940 First Army maneuvers. After the maneuver, the 1st Division was transferred to the VI Corps, the 27th Division was transferred to the VII Corps, and the 28th and 29th Divisions were assigned to the II Corps. The corps HHC were transferred temporarily to Fort George G. Meade, Maryland, from 10 to 26 December 1940, after which they were transferred to the Pennsylvania Railroad Building, Wilmington, Delaware, arriving there on 26 December 1940. The corps participated in the Carolina Maneuvers in September–November 1941 as part of the First Army. After the maneuver, the corps headquarters began to return to Wilmington and was en route to home stations on 7 December 1941.

=== World War II ===
Six months after the Japanese attack on Pearl Harbor and the American entry into World War II, II Corps was sent to England in June 1942, under the command of Major General Mark W. Clark. In November, now under Major General Lloyd Fredendall, II Corps landed in Oran as part of Operation Torch, the Allied invasion of French North Africa. After initially making good headway against German forces during the Tunisia Campaign, II Corps was defeated by German troops under Hans-Jürgen von Arnim at the Battle of Sidi Bou Zid. II Corps was again decisively defeated in February 1943 during the Battle of Kasserine Pass by veteran troops under Generalfeldmarschall Erwin Rommel. The defeats were compounded by American inexperience, poor senior leadership, and lack of armor comparable to that in the German panzer forces, as well as the highly effective German high-velocity 88 mm anti-tank guns, which were used in screening tactics to destroy American tanks lured into pursuit of German armored forces.

On 6 March 1943, Major General George Patton would relieve Fredendall, II Corps recovered its cohesion and fought for the rest of the Tunisia Campaign, with a stalemate at the Battle of El Guettar. II Corps held the southern flank of the British First Army during the destruction of the remaining Axis forces in North Africa. The war in North Africa ended in May 1943 with almost 275,000 Axis soldiers surrendering, to become prisoners of war.

On 10 July 1943, II Corps, commanded now by Major General Omar Bradley, took part in the amphibious invasion of Sicily (codenamed Operation Husky) under the command of the U.S. Seventh Army. It played a key role in the liberation of the western part of the island. The corps consisted of the 1st Infantry Division (United States), 3rd, 9th, and 45th Infantry Divisions. The Allied campaign in Sicily came to an end after 38 days.

Now under Major General Geoffrey Keyes, II Corps was sent to the Italian Front, arriving in mid-November as part of the U.S. Fifth Army, where it was to serve for the rest of the conflict, participating in grueling mountain warfare and often experienced fighting in terrible weather conditions. Soon after arrival, II Corps took the 3rd and 36th Infantry Divisions under command. In late January 1944 II Corps, now with the 1st Armored Division under command, took part in the Battle of Rapido River, part of the first Battle of Monte Cassino, to distract German attention away from the Anzio landings. The operation failed with heavy losses in the 36th Division. During the fourth and final battle of Cassino in May, II Corps consisted of the 85th and 88th Infantry Divisions. For the assault of the German Gothic Line, II Corps consisted of the 34th, 88th and 91st Infantry Divisions. The corps moved up the western side of Italy, and fought in the Spring 1945 offensive in Italy, where it ended up on the right flank of the Fifth Army in May 1945.

II Corps was inactivated in Austria on 10 October 1945, following Germany's surrender.

=== Cold War ===
In March 1958, Camp Kilmer, New Jersey, became headquarters for the reactivated II Corps as the controlling headquarters for United States Army Reserve units across the northeast. It also assigned personnel to active duty during the Vietnam War when its headquarters was moved to Fort Wadsworth, New York.

=== Inactivation ===
The corps was inactivated on 5 June 1970.

== Commanders ==
- MG Henry C. Pratt 26 November 1940 – 20 August 1941
- MG Mark W. Clark 1 July 1942 – 10 October 1942
- MG Lloyd Fredendall 10 October 1942 – 5 March 1943
- MG George S. Patton, Jr. 5 March 1943 – 16 April 1943
- MG Omar N. Bradley 16 April 1943 – 9 September 1943
- MG John P. Lucas 9 September 1943 – 19 September 1943
- MG Geoffrey Keyes 19 September 1943 – 10 October 1945
