= Philip Bracken Fleming =

American general and diplomat (1887–1955)

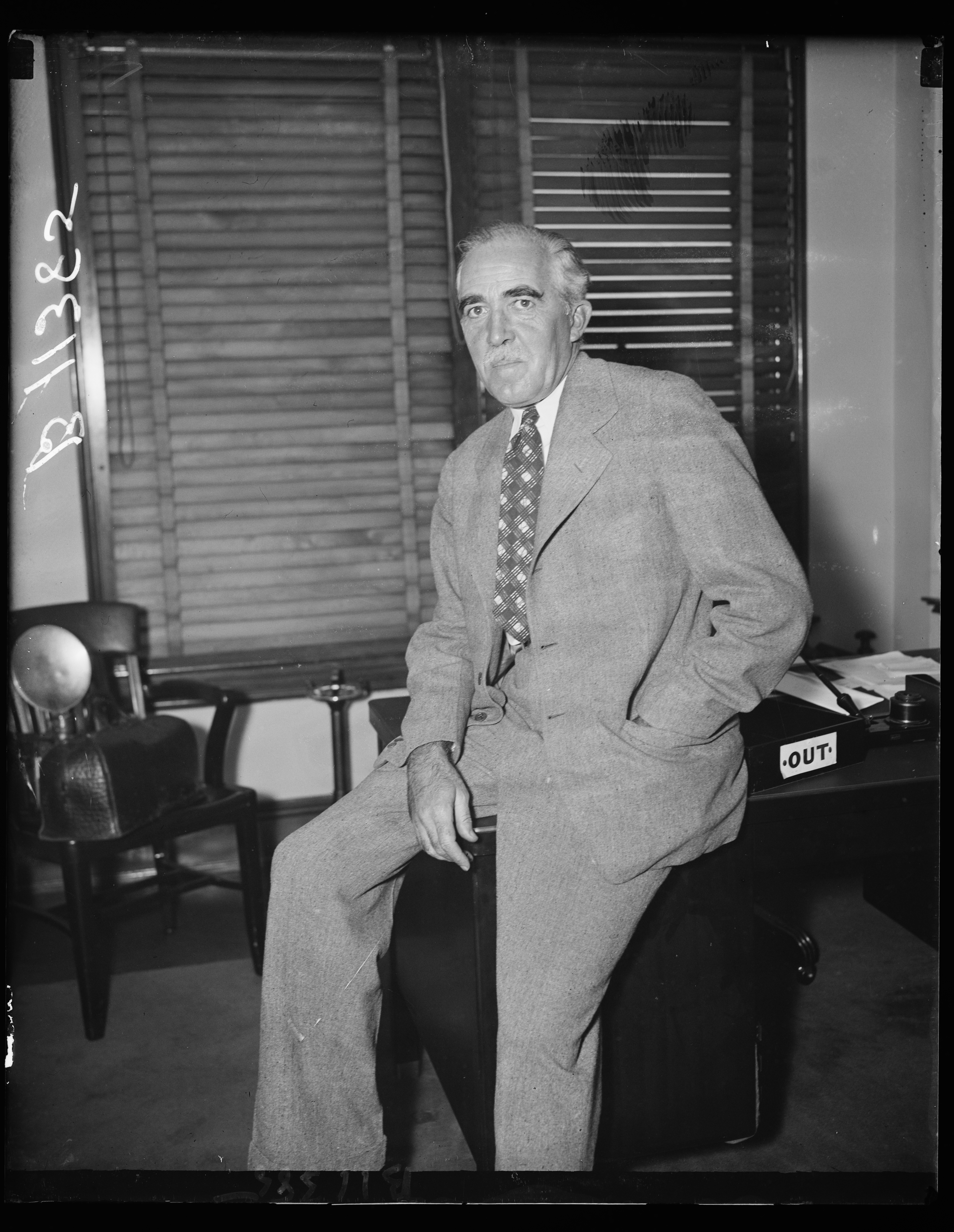

United States Ambassador to Costa Rica
- In office 1951–1953
- President: Harry S. Truman
- Preceded by: Joseph Flack
- Succeeded by: Robert C. Hill

Administrator of the Office of Temporary Controls
- In office 1946–1947
- President: Harry S. Truman
- Preceded by: Position established
- Succeeded by: Office abolished

Personal details
- Born: October 15, 1887 Burlington, Iowa, U.S.
- Died: October 6, 1955 (aged 67) Washington, D.C., U.S.

Philip Bracken Fleming (October 15, 1887 – October 6, 1955) was a United States Army general and United States Ambassador to Costa Rica.

== Biography ==
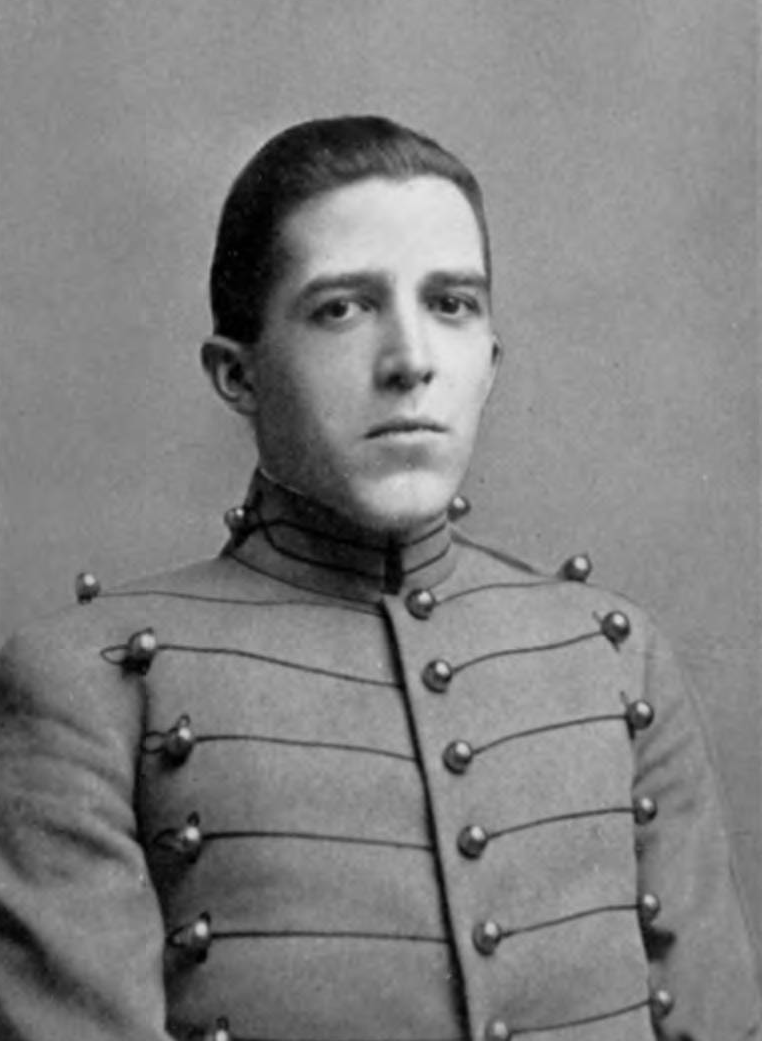
At West Point in 1911

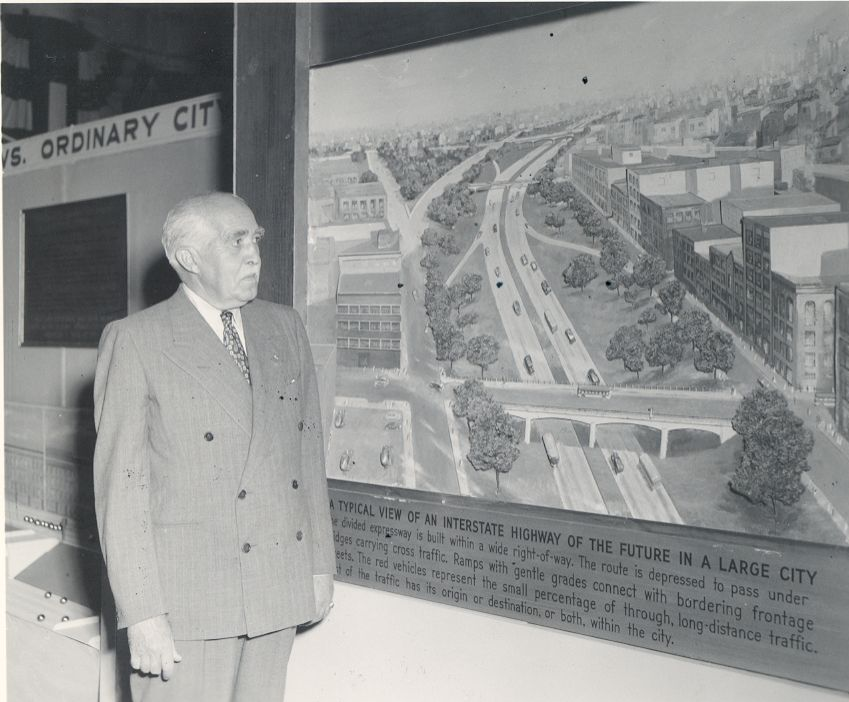
Fleming views Public Roads Administration exhibit at the 1948 convention of the American Road Builders Association in Chicago

The Iowa-born Fleming was son of John Joseph and Mary Bracken Fleming. From 1905 to 1907 he attended the University of Wisconsin.

Fleming was cadet at the United States Military Academy from June 15, 1907, until June 13, 1911, when he graduated first in his class. Many of his classmates, such as Charles P. Hall, William H. H. Morris Jr., Alexander Surles, John R. Homer, Raymond A. Wheeler, John P. Lucas, Harry R. Kutz, Herbert Dargue, Ira T. Wyche, Karl S. Bradford, Frederick Gilbreath, Gustav H. Franke, Paul W. Baade, Jesse A. Ladd, Thompson Lawrence, Bethel Wood Simpson, James B. Crawford, Joseph C. Mehaffey, Harold F. Nichols and James R.N. Weaver, became general officers before, during or after World War II

He was promoted to Second Lieutenant, Corps of Engineers.

During his military career, he held the following ranks: August 1, 1935 Lieutenant-Colonel, January 1, 1940, Colonel, February 14, 1941, Brigadier-General (Army of the United States), October 25, 1942 Major-General (Army of the United States), January 31, 1947 Major-General (Regular Army, Retired).

Still serving in the U.S. Army through January 1947, he held several posts in the late 1930s as District Engineer in Maine and Minnesota, then two jobs in the Labor Department, and from December 4, 1941, to May 26, 1949, as Federal Works Administrator. In late 1946, Fleming was appointed administrator of the Office of Temporary Controls, working with officials of the former Office of Price Administration. In 1949, he became Chairman of the US Maritime Commission, and in May 1950 Under-Secretary of Commerce.

From 1951 to 1953, he served as ambassador to Costa Rica. He died on October 6, 1955. Fleming was buried at Arlington National Cemetery.

Diplomatic posts
Preceded by Joseph Flack	United States Ambassador to Costa Rica; 1951–1953	Succeeded by Robert C. Hill
