= William H. H. Morris Jr. =

United States Army general (1890–1971)

William Henry Harrison Morris Jr.
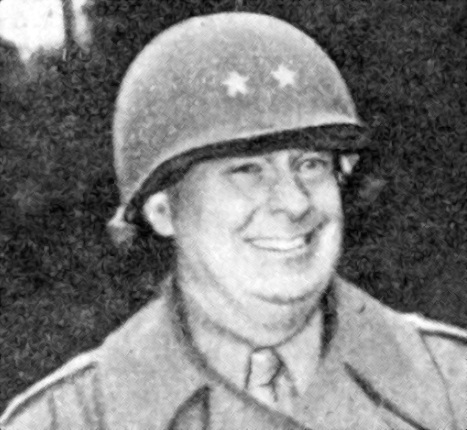
- Born: March 22, 1890; Ocean Grove, New Jersey, United States
- Died: March 30, 1971 (aged 81); Washington, D.C., United States
- Burial place: Arlington National Cemetery, Virginia, United States
- Military career
- Allegiance: United States
- Branch: United States Army
- Service years: 1911–1952
- Rank: Lieutenant General
- Service number: 0-3102
- Unit: Infantry Branch
- Commands: 1st Battalion, 360th Infantry Regiment; 2nd Battalion, 66th Infantry Regiment; 66th Armored Regiment; 6th Armored Division; II Armored Corps; XVIII Corps; 10th Armored Division; VI Corps; Caribbean Defense Command
- Conflicts: Philippine–American War; World War I World War II; Korean War
- Awards: Distinguished Service Cross; Army Distinguished Service Medal; Silver Star; Purple Heart; Bronze Star

Lieutenant General William Henry Harrison Morris Jr. (March 22, 1890 – March 30, 1971) was a senior United States Army officer who fought in both World War I and World War II.

== Early life and military career ==
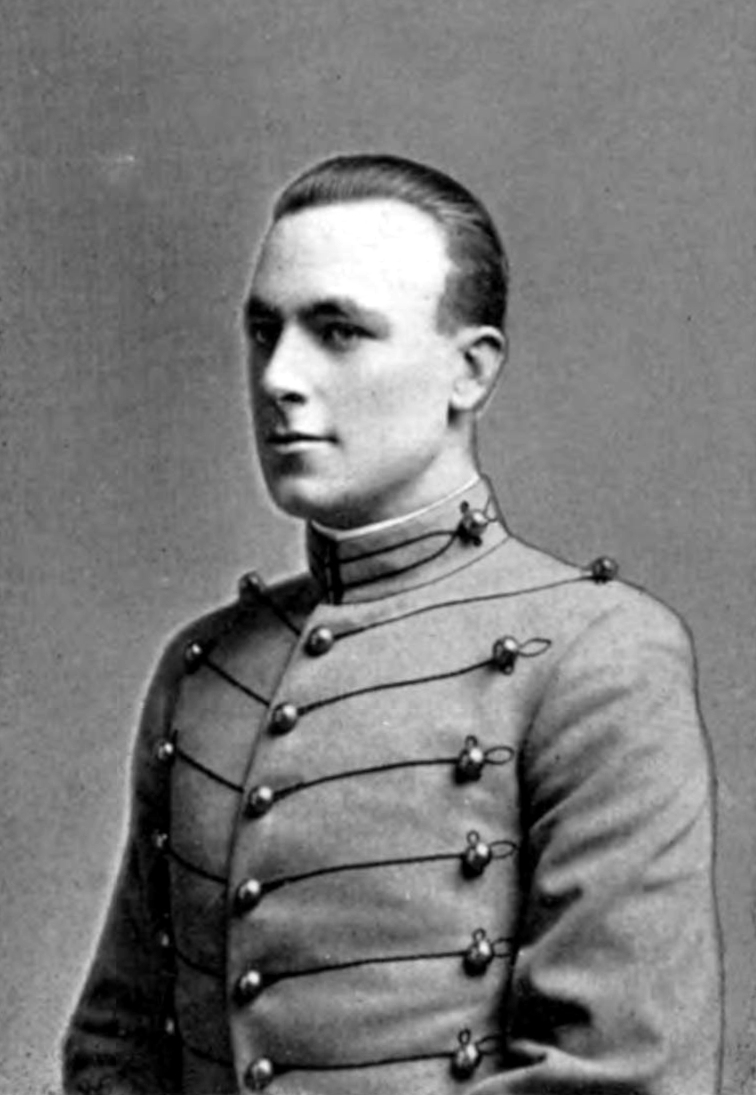
At West Point in 1911

William Morris was born in the Ocean Grove section of Neptune Township, New Jersey, on March 22, 1890. After graduating from grammar school and high school he was appointed by Congressman Benjamin Franklin Howell to the United States Military Academy (USMA) at West Point, New York, in 1907. He graduated from there in June 1911, alongside John P. Lucas, Frederick Gilbreath, Charles P. Hall, Joseph Cowles Mehaffey, John R. Homer, Karl Slaughter Bradford, Thompson Lawrence, Jesse A. Ladd, Gustave H. Franke, James R.N. Weaver, Paul W. Baade, Herbert Dargue, Alexander Surles, Harold F. Nichols, Raymond Albert Wheeler, Philip Bracken Fleming, Ira T. Wyche. Like Morris, all of these men would become general officers before, during, or after World War II.

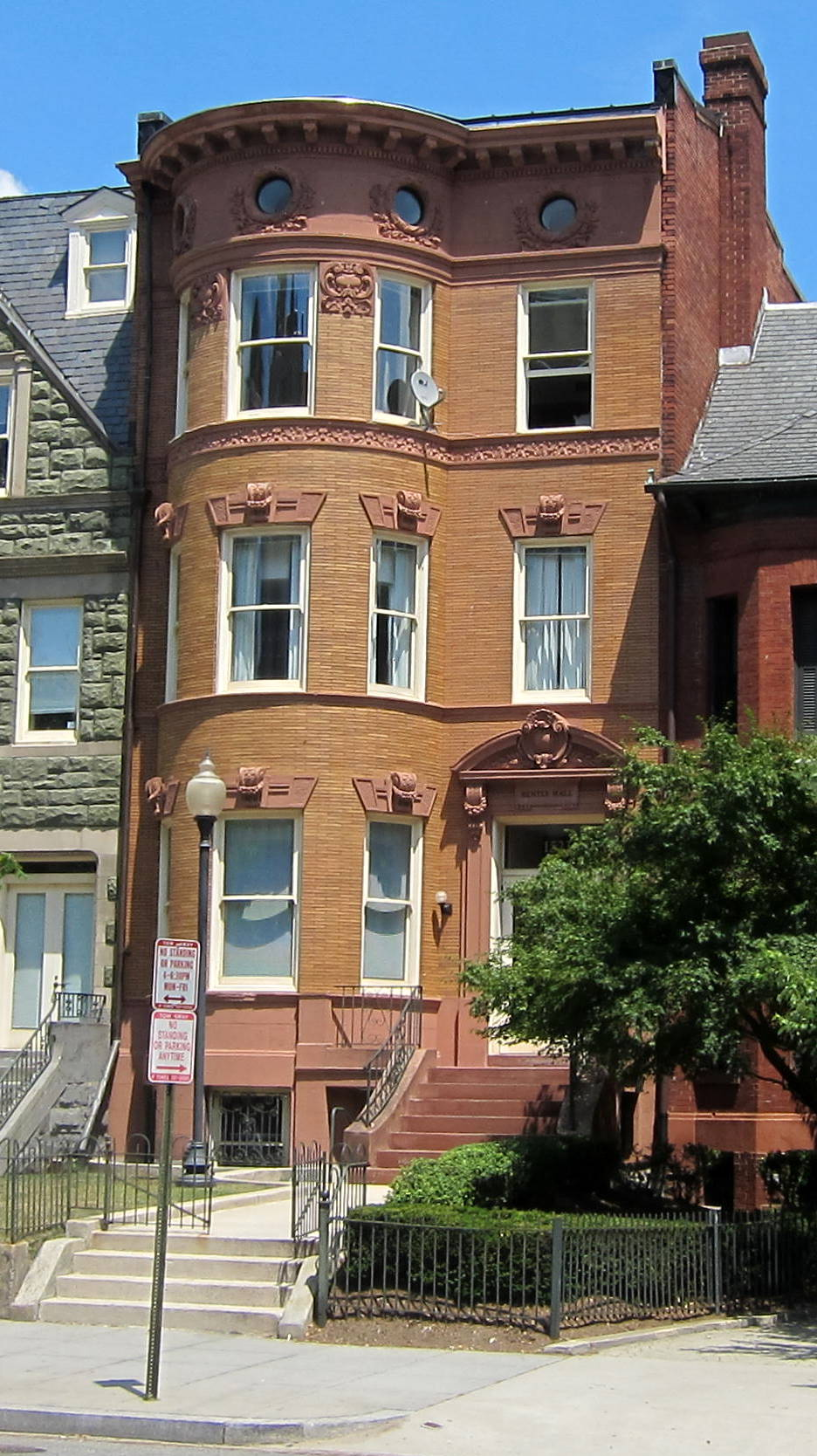
The former residence of Lieutenant General William H. H. Morris in Washington, D.C.

After graduation he was commissioned as a second lieutenant into the Infantry Branch of the United States Army and was assigned to the 19th Infantry Regiment at Camp Jossman, Philippine Islands. He then served at Fort McKinley, afterwards transferring to the 15th Infantry Regiment with duty in Tianjin, China, where he served from 1912 to 1914.

In 1914, Morris was assigned to the 9th Infantry Regiment in Laredo, Texas, where he served until 1916. While there he married Ida Marguerite Downing, who he met soon after being commissioned in 1911. Morris was then appointed as a Reserve Officers' Training Corps (ROTC) instructor and basketball coach at Texas Agricultural and Mechanical College (now Texas A&M University), where he served until 1917, when he returned to the 9th Infantry Regiment as its S-2 intelligence officer.

Morris was promoted to captain on May 15, 1917, over a month after the American entry into World War I. Thirteen months later he was a major. In July 1918 he was sent to the Western Front and was appointed commanding officer (CO) of the 1st Battalion, 360th Infantry Regiment, part of the 90th Division of the American Expeditionary Force (AEF). He led his battalion in the Battle of Saint-Mihiel and in the Meuse–Argonne offensive. He was wounded on November 1, just ten days before the end of hostilities on November 11, 1918, an action for which he received the Distinguished Service Cross, the nation's second highest award for valor in the face of the enemy, and the Purple Heart. He remained in Europe with the Army of occupation, commanding his battalion in Germany, and then serving on the staffs of the (AEF) General Headquarters (GHQ) and the IX Corps.

== Between the wars ==
After the war Morris returned to the United States in June 1919 as a ROTC instructor at Bucknell University, Pennsylvania, where he was a professor of Military Science and Tactics. After that he served with the 10th Infantry Regiment at Fort Hayes, Ohio. He entered the U.S. Army Command and General Staff School at Fort Leavenworth, Kansas in 1924, and graduated from there in 1925. After he graduated he served as a staff officer with the HQ of the 8th Coast Artillery Regiment, then stationed at Fort Sam Houston, Texas. In 1929 he entered the U.S. Army War College at Washington, D.C., and graduated the following year. He remained there for the next three years as an instructor.

In 1937, he served with, and later commanded, the 2nd Battalion, 66th Infantry Regiment at Fort Benning, Georgia. From 1938 to 1940 Morris served as a G-1 staff officer on the General Staff of the War Department in Washington, D.C. By late 1940 he was commander of the 66th Armored Regiment.

== World War II ==
In February 1942, two months after the United States entered World War II, Morris, by now promoted to the one-star general officer rank of brigadier general, raised the 6th Armored Division as its first Commanding General (CG). He was promoted to the two-star rank of major general fifteen months later, in May 1943. In 1943 he was CG of the II Armored Corps. He was sent to Italy as a Ground Force Observer for the Salerno landings in September 1943. He returned to the United States and became CG of the XVIII Corps.

Upon hearing of the death of Major General Paul Newgarden, CG of the 10th Armored Division, who died in a plane accident, in July 1944, he contacted General George C. Marshall, the U.S. Army Chief of Staff, and requested demotion to command of the 10th Armored Division, then preparing for transfer to the European Theater of Operations (ETO).

His request was granted and he led the division overseas on the Western Front, where it played a played a vital role in the relief of Bastogne during the Battle of the Bulge, the largest battle fought by the American Army during World War II. Following this he was assigned to command VI Corps in Lieutenant General Alexander Patch's U.S. Seventh Army in the U.S. Sixth Army Group, under Lieutenant General Jacob L. Devers, which drove from the Rhine to Italy in the spring of 1945. The 411th Infantry Regiment of the 103rd Infantry Division linked up there at Vipiteno on May 4 with troops of the 349th Infantry Regiment of the 88th Infantry Division of the Fifth Army, joining the Central European and Mediterranean theatres.

== Postwar ==
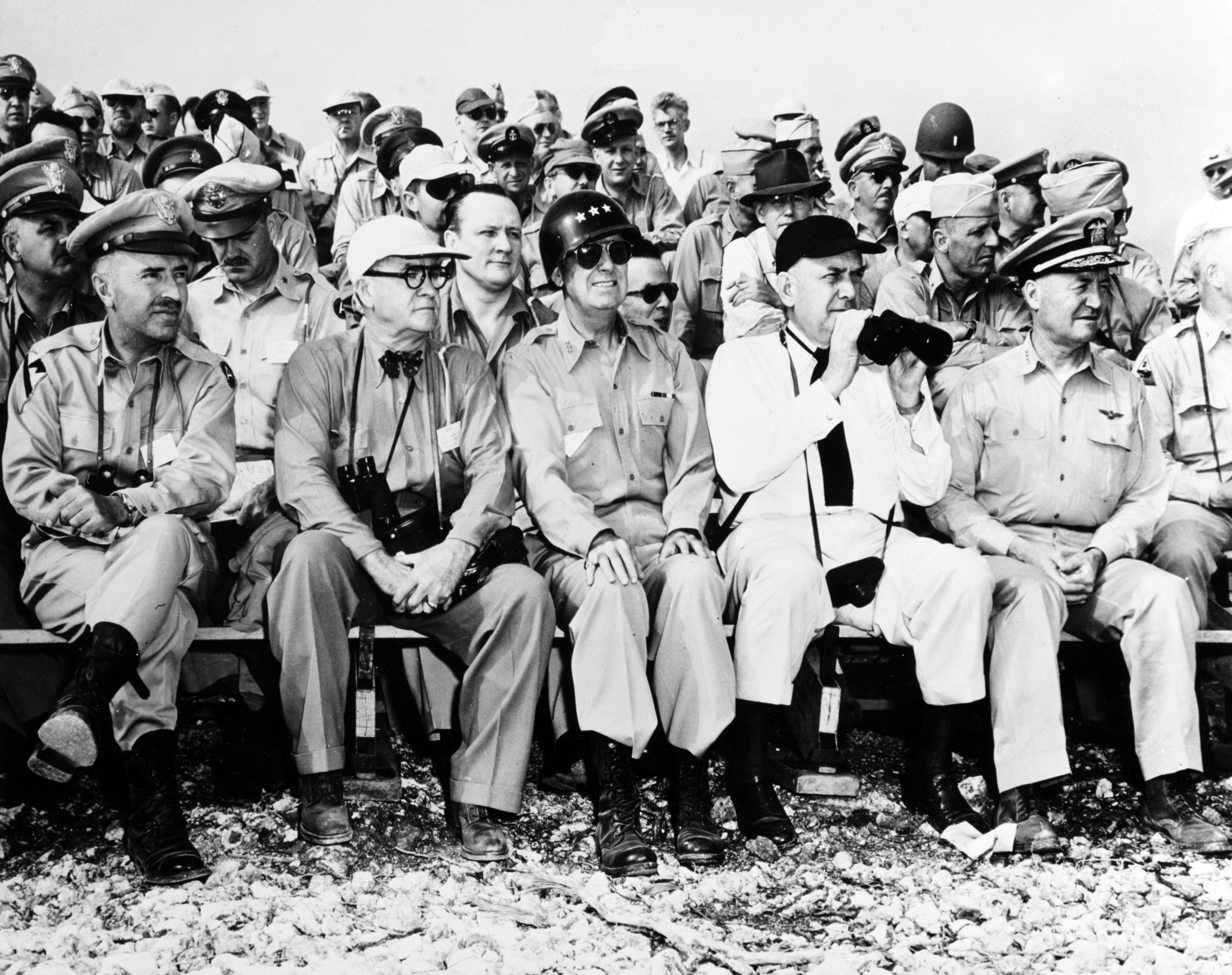
Lieutenant General William H. H. Morris (third from left) with other Department of Defense officials and military officers, March 8, 1950

After the war, from 1945 to 1948, Morris served on the War Department Personnel Board in Washington, D.C.

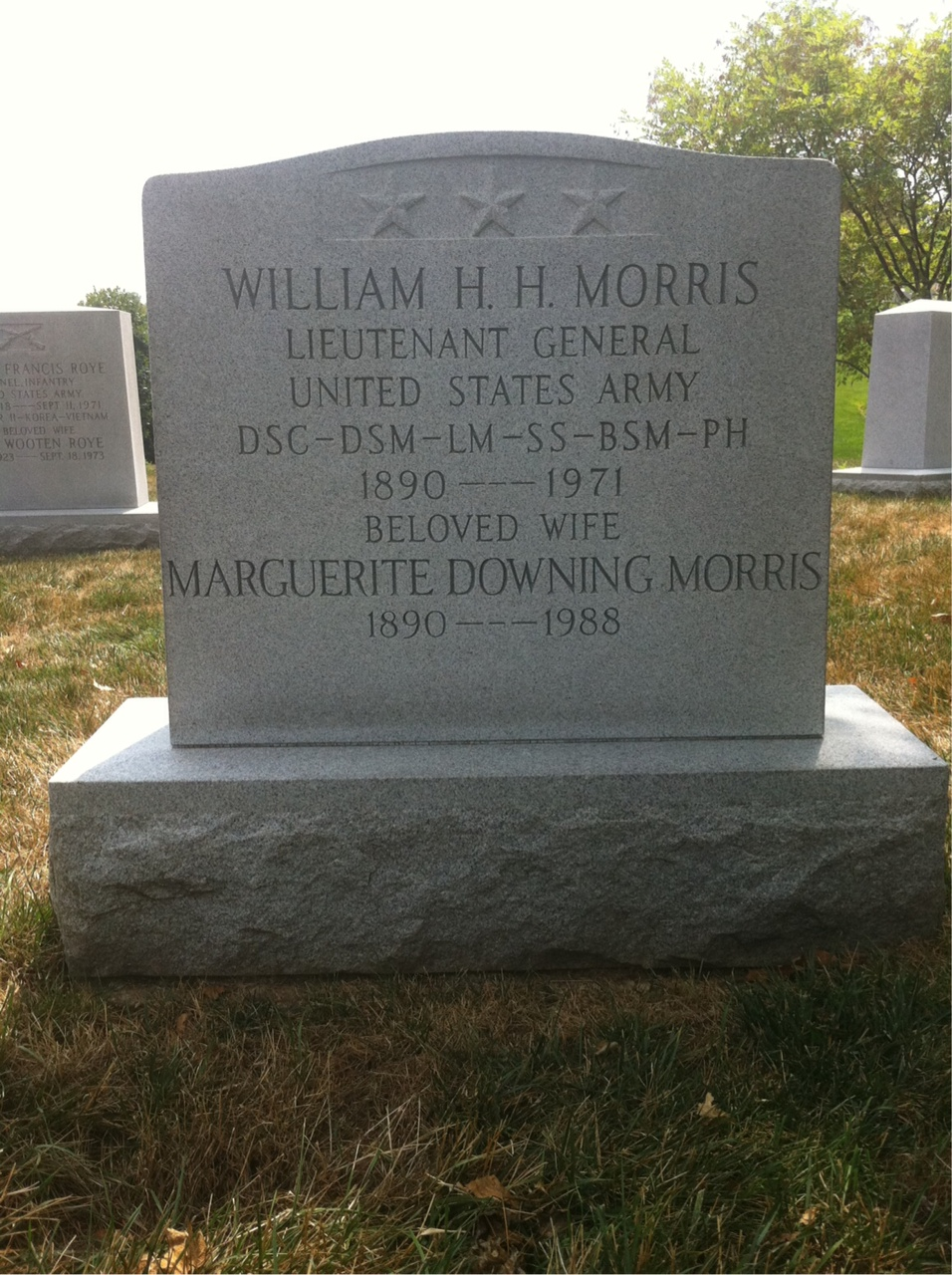
The grave of Lieutenant General William Henry Harrison Morris Jr. at Arlington National Cemetery

In 1949, he was assigned as head of the U.S. Caribbean Command as a lieutenant general, where he remained until his 1952 retirement from the army.

Morris died on March 30, 1971, in Washington, D.C.. He is buried in Arlington National Cemetery, Virginia, Section 5, Grave 47.

== Awards and decorations ==
William Morris's awards and decorations included the Distinguished Service Cross, Army Distinguished Service Medal, Silver Star, Legion of Merit, Bronze Star and Purple Heart.

=== Citation for Distinguished Service Cross ===
For extraordinary heroism in action near Villers-devant-Dun, France, November 1, 1918. During darkness he led his battalion in an attack under heavy artillery and machine-gun fire. Upon reaching a hill he exposed himself to heavy fire to reconnoiter personally the enemy position, and then, although wounded by a machine-gun bullet, heroically led his battalion in their advance, refusing to be evacuated, inspiring his men by his personal courage.

Name: Morris, William H.H. Jr. Rank: Major, U.S. Army Organization: 360th Infantry Regiment, 90th Division, A.E.F. Date of Action: November 1, 1918, Order: General Orders 87, War Department, 1919 Home Town: Ocean Grove, New Jersey

Military offices
Preceded by Newly activated organization	Commanding General 6th Armored Division; 1942–1943	Succeeded by Robert W. Grow
Preceded by Newly activated organization	Commanding General II Armored Corps; 1943–1944	Succeeded by Post redesignated XVIII Airborne Corps
Preceded by Paul Newgarden	Commanding General 10th Armored Division; 1944–1945	Succeeded by Fay B. Prickett
Preceded by Edward H. Brooks	Commanding General VI Corps; 1945–1946	Succeeded by Post deactivated
