= Paul W. Baade =

U.S. Army Major General

Paul William Baade
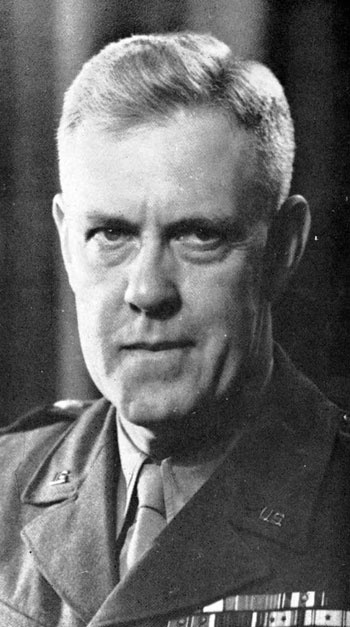
- Born: April 16, 1889; Fort Wayne, Indiana, U.S.
- Died: October 9, 1959 (aged 70); San Francisco, California, U.S.
- Military career
- Allegiance: United States
- Branch: United States Army
- Service years: 1911–1946
- Rank: Major General
- Nickname: "Baby Paul"
- Service number: 0-3099
- Unit: Infantry Branch
- Commands: 35th Infantry Division; 16th Infantry Regiment
- Conflicts: World War I: Meuse-Argonne Offensive; World War II: Battle of Normandy; Operation Lüttich; Battle of Nancy; Battle of the Bulge; Western Allied invasion of Germany
- Awards: Army Distinguished Service Medal; Silver Star (2); Legion of Merit; Bronze Star Medal (3)

Major General Paul William Baade (April 16, 1889 – October 9, 1959) was a highly decorated United States Army officer. An alumnus of the United States Military Academy (USMA) alumni and veteran of World War I and World War II, he is most noted as one of the four wartime commanders of the 35th Infantry Division during the latter conflict.

Baade distinguished himself during his service in the Battle of Normandy in mid-1944, where he received several decorations for bravery and leadership. He later led his division during the siege of Bastogne and in combat in the Netherlands.

== Early life and military career ==
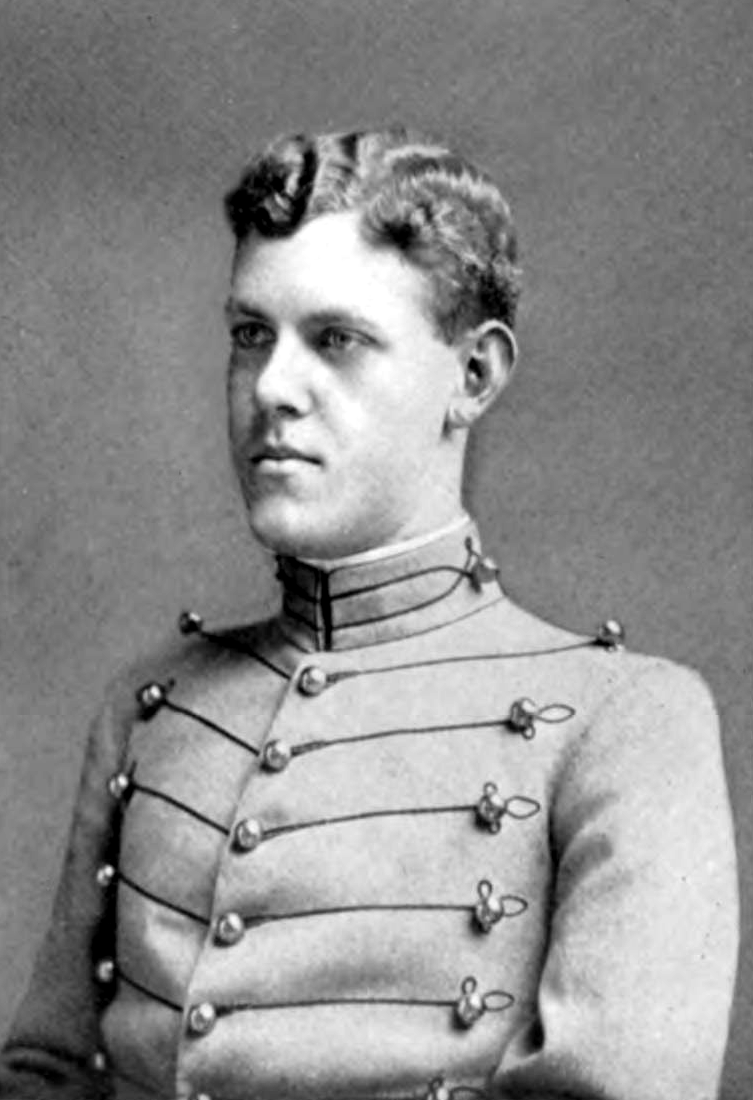
At West Point in 1911

Paul William Baade was born on April 16, 1889, in Fort Wayne, Indiana, a son of Fred C. Baade and his wife Anna Paul Baade. Following high school, he received an appointment to the United States Military Academy (USMA) at West Point, New York, in June 1907 and earned nickname "Baby Paul" due to his clear blue eyes and velvet-like skin. During his time at the Academy, Baade reached the rank of cadet lieutenant, and was active on the baseball and hockey squads.

He graduated 49th in a class of 82 cadets on June 13, 1911, with a Bachelor of Science degree, and was commissioned a second lieutenant in the Infantry Branch on the same date. Many of his classmates, such as Charles P. Hall, William H. H. Morris Jr., Alexander Surles, John R. Homer, Raymond A. Wheeler, John P. Lucas, Harry R. Kutz, Herbert Dargue, Ira T. Wyche, Karl S. Bradford, Frederick Gilbreath, Gustav H. Franke, Philip B. Fleming, Jesse A. Ladd, Thompson Lawrence, Bethel Wood Simpson, James B. Crawford, Joseph C. Mehaffey, Harold F. Nichols and James R.N. Weaver, also became general officers before, during or after World War II.

Upon his commissioning, Baade was attached to the 11th Infantry Regiment at Fort D.A. Russell, Wyoming, and remained there until February 1913. During his service at Fort D.A. Russell, he married his longtime sweetheart, Margaret Craig, in June 1912.

He subsequently served with the 11th Infantry on the Mexican border at Texas City, Texas, until he embarked for the Philippines for service with the 8th Infantry Regiment. While in the Philippines, he reached the rank of captain, and returned to the United States in mid-1916 for duty with the 54th Infantry Regiment at Chickamaugua Park, Georgia.

== World War I ==
Following the American entry into World War I in April 1917, Baade was promoted to the temporary rank of major and attended the Sixth Division's Foreign Officers’ School. He then served at Camp Wadsworth, South Carolina, until he embarked for France with the advance party of the 81st Infantry Division under Brigadier General Charles H. Barth in July 1918.

Baade was promoted to the temporary rank of lieutenant colonel and attached to the 322nd Infantry Regiment. He commanded a battalion during the occupancy of the Saint-Dié Sector and later took part in the bitter actions east of the Soin-Medieu Sector and in the Argonne Forest.

Upon the Armistice was signed, he was stationed at Laignes until June 1919, when his regiment was ordered back to the United States and demobilized at Camp Lee, Virginia. Baade was reverted to his peacetime rank of captain.

== Between the wars ==
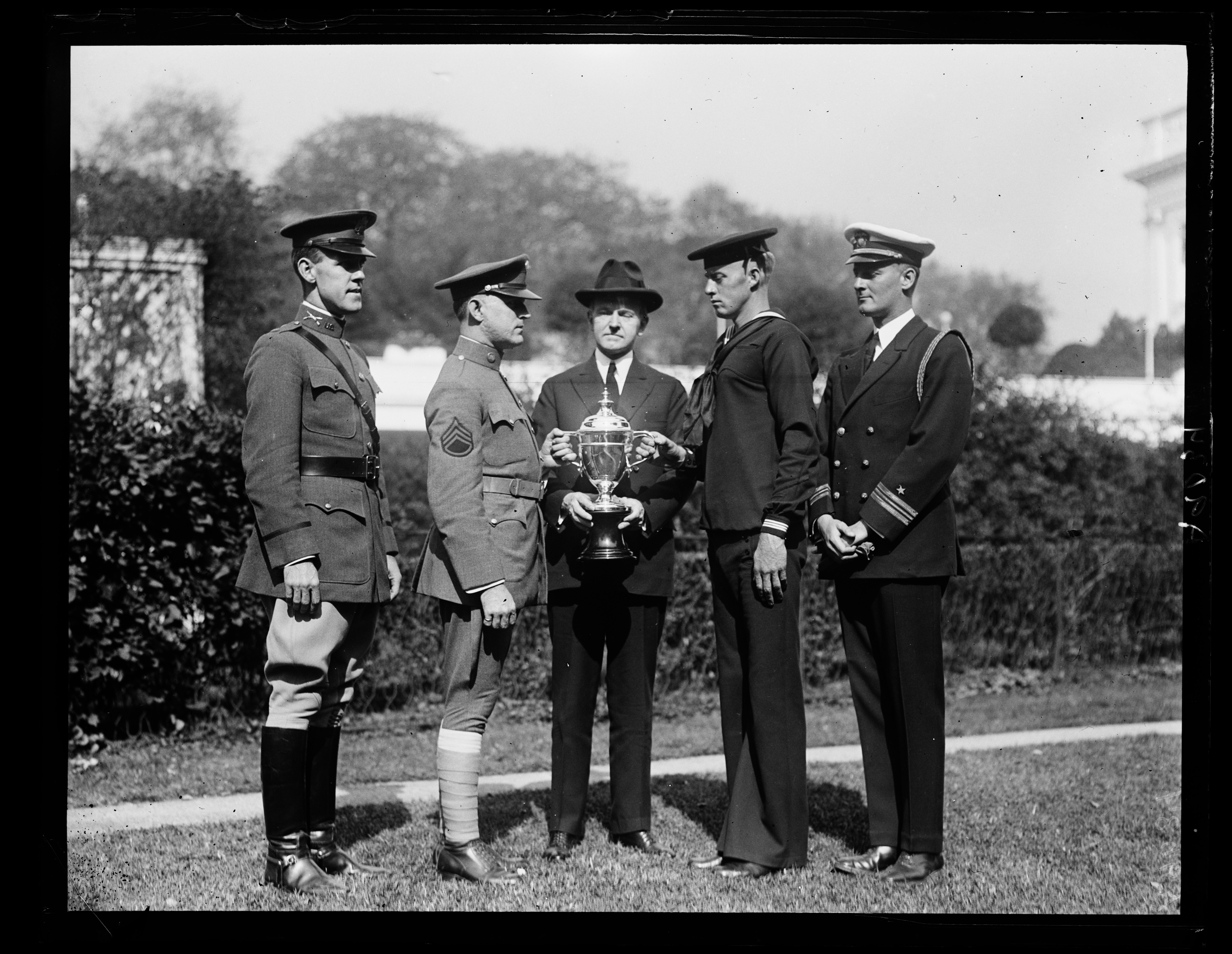
Major Baade (left) as Army Athletic Officer with President Calvin Coolidge (center) with the cup which he had donated to be contested for annually by the enlisted men of the 1924 Army and Navy in a football game

Baade was then appointed Professor of Military Science & Tactics at Boston University and remained in this capacity until summer 1923, when he entered the course at the Army Command and General Staff College at Fort Leavenworth, Kansas. Following his graduation one year later, he served in the Office of the Chief of Infantry under Major General Charles S. Farnsworth until he was sent to the Junior course at the Army War College in Washington, D.C., in June 1928. During his service in Washington, Baade also served as Army Athletic Officer during the 1924 Army-Navy football game.

He was promoted to the permanent rank of major in July 1927 shortly after his graduation from the Army War College, and assumed duties with the 29th Infantry Regiment at Fort Benning, Georgia. Baade served as regimental Plans & Training Officer until August 1935, when he was transferred to the staff of the Sixth Corps Area as Assistant Chief of Staff for logistics under Major General Frank Ross McCoy. He was promoted to lieutenant colonel on August 1, 1935.

Baade assumed duties as Acting Chief of the Construction Division, War Department General Staff, in September 1936 and served in this capacity until he became Chief of the Construction Division in June 1938. He was transferred to Fort Jay, New York in August 1939 and served as executive officer of the 16th Infantry Regiment until June 1940, when he assumed command of the regiment. Baade was promoted to colonel at the time.

He served with the regiment during maneuvers in Georgia and Louisiana, and following his appointment as commanding officer, Baade led his unit during maneuvers in northern New York. He was then stationed with the regiment at Fort Devens until he was promoted to the temporary rank of brigadier general and appointed commanding general of the Puerto Rico General Department in July 1940, with Henry B. Cheadle succeeding him in command of the 16th Infantry Regiment. His headquarters was located at Fort Buchanan and he also commanded the General Depot and the Mobile Force there.

== World War II ==
=== Stateside service ===
In July 1942, seven months after the United States entered World War II, Baade was ordered to Camp San Luis Obispo, California, and assigned to the 35th Infantry Division, an Army National Guard formation, under Major General Maxwell Murray as the assistant division commander (ADC). Baade succeeded Murray in command of the division in January 1943, and received a promotion to major general one month later. He was succeeded as ADC of the division by Brigadier General John K. Rice until the latter was replaced by Brigadier General Edmund Sebree, and he in turn by Brigadier General Butler B. Miltonberger. Baade led his division during the Tennessee Maneuvers between November 1943 and January 1944 and during mountain warfare training in the West Virginia Maneuver Area in February and March 1944.

=== European Theater ===
Baade embarked for England with the 35th Infantry Division in May 1944 and after a few weeks there, it was ordered to France. He landed in Normandy on July 5, 1944, almost a full month after the Normandy landings, and entered combat seven days later at the outskirts of Saint-Lô. The 35th Infantry Division repelled twelve German counterattacks at Emelie before entering Saint-Lô on July 18. After mopping up in the Saint-Lô area, it took part in the offensive action southwest of Saint-Lô, pushing the Germans across the Vire River on August 2, and breaking out of the Cotentin Peninsula. Baade was later decorated with the Silver Star for his early service in Normandy.

Between August 7 to 13, 1944, Baade led the 35th Infantry Division during the assault at Mortain and repelled a strong enemy counter-offensive. He subsequently took part in the rescue of the 30th Division's "Lost Battalion" which had been surrounded. Baade constantly visited his front line troops, inspiring and encouraging them by his courageous personal example. Under his gallant leadership the Division accomplished its mission and relieved the besieged battalion. Baade was subsequently decorated with a second Silver Star.

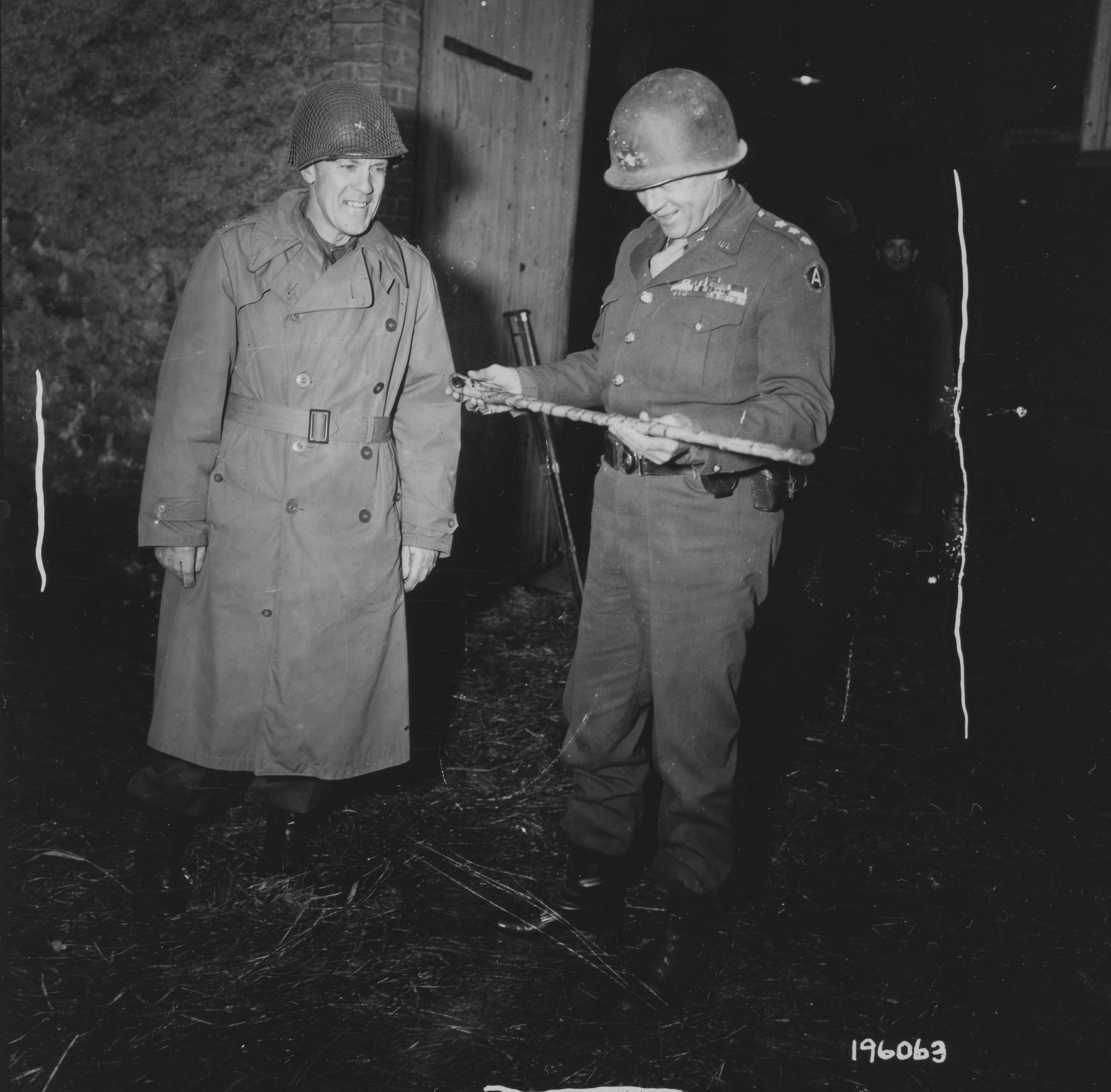
Major General Paul W. Baade shows his souvenir cane to Lieutenant General George S. Patton, commander of the U.S. Third Army, Nancy, France, November 3, 1944. The cane is inscribed with the names of the French towns liberated by Baade's 35th Division.

Baade commanded his division during the Battle of Nancy in mid-September and helped secure the city after a week of bitter fighting. The 35th Infantry Division then secured Chambrey on October 1, and drove on to the German border, taking Sarreguemines and crossing the Saar on December 8. After crossing the Blies River on December 12, the division moved to Metz for rest and rehabilitation on December 19. For this period of service, Baade received the Army Distinguished Service Medal and Legion of Honor, rank Officer and Croix de guerre 1939-1945 with Palm by the Government of France.

The division's rest was interrupted by the massive German counterattack in mid-December 1944 and Baade took part in the fighting to relieve Bastogne, throwing off the attacks of four German divisions, taking Villers-laBonne-Eau on January 10, after a 13-day fight and Lutrebois in a 5-day engagement. On January 18, 1945, the division returned to Metz to resume its interrupted rest.

Baade and his division was defending the Foret de Domaniale area at the end of January 1945 and then moved to the Netherlands to hold a defensive line along the Roer on February 22. The division subsequently attacked across the Roer, pierced the Siegfried Line, reached the Rhine at Wesel on March 10, and crossed March 25–26. It destroyed the enemy's defenses across the Herne Canal and reached the Ruhr River early in April, when it was ordered to move to the Elbe April 12.

The 35th Infantry Division finished its World War II service in Hanover, where it took part in mopping-up duty until VE-day. For his service in 1945, Baade received the Legion of Merit, three awards of the Bronze Star Medal and the Dutch Order of Orange-Nassau, rank of Grand Officer.

== Post World War II ==
Baade subsequently commanded his division during the occupation of Hanover and Recklinghausen, and then governed the Coblenz area until late July 1945, when control was relinquished to the French Army. The 35th Infantry Division was subsequently ordered for England and then embarked for the United States, where it was inactivated at Camp Breckinridge, Kentucky, on December 7, 1945.

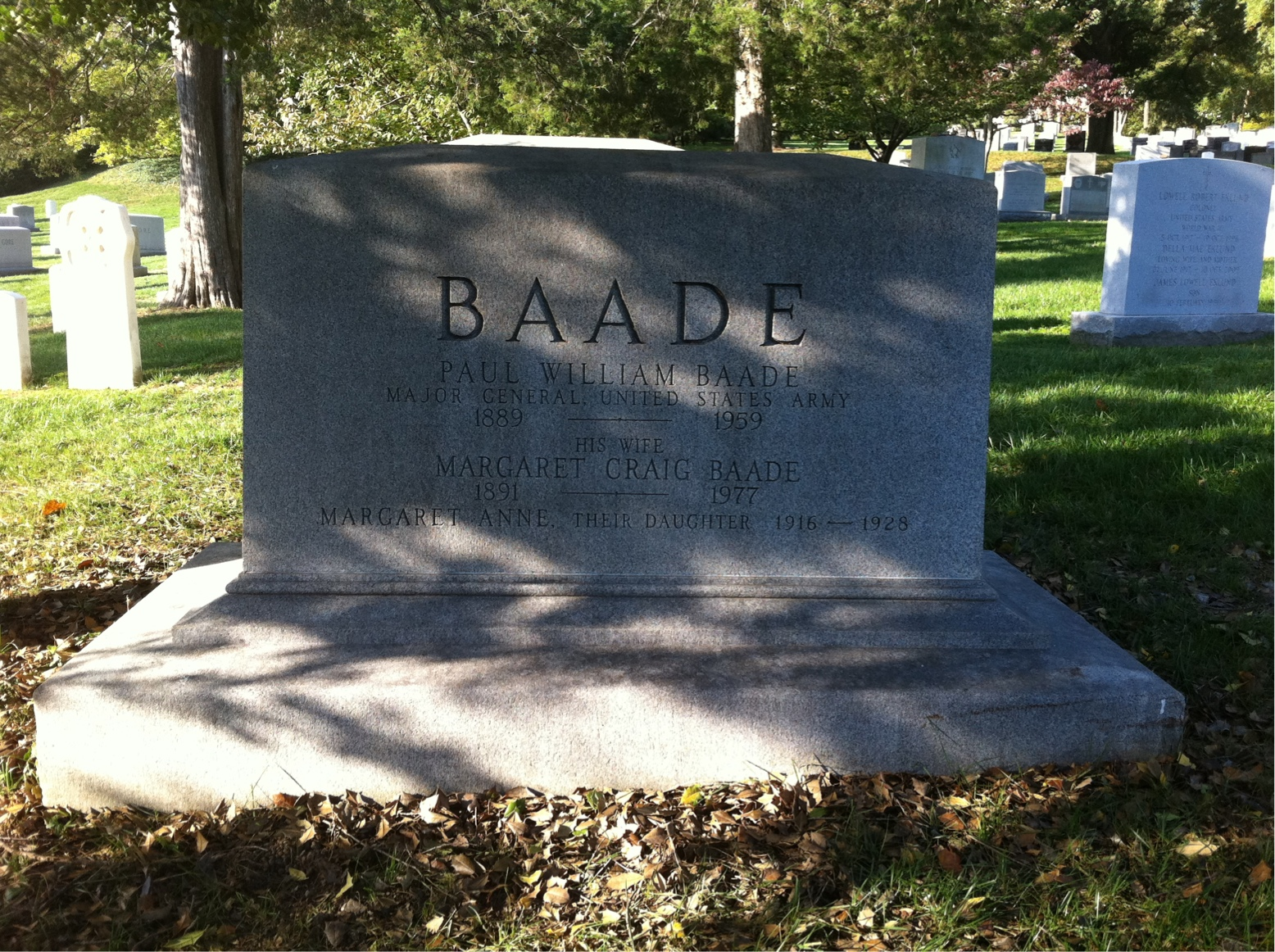
The grave of Major General Paul W. Baade at Arlington National Cemetery

He was subsequently appointed Assistant Chief of Staff for Operations (G-3), Army Service Forces under General Brehon B. Somervell. Following the inactivation of Army Service Forces on June 11, 1946, Baade was ordered home, awaiting retirement. He retired from active duty on September 30, 1946, after 35 years of commissioned service.

On December 7, 1946, Baade and his wife survived the Winecoff Hotel fire in Atlanta, Georgia by crawling across a plank to a neighboring building.

Baade resided in Santa Barbara, California, and served as vice president of the Botanic Gardens, and also on the boards of directors of the Channel City Club, the Valley Club of Montecito, and the Montecito Board. He was also active in the Episcopal Church.

Major General Paul W. Baade died on October 9, 1959, in San Francisco, California, and was buried with full military honors at Arlington National Cemetery.

A collection of Baade's personal papers is located at the Harry S. Truman Presidential Library and Museum in Independence, Missouri.

== Decorations ==
Here is Major General Baade's ribbon bar:

1st Row	Army Distinguished Service Medal		Silver Star with Oak Leaf Cluster	
2nd Row	Legion of Merit	Bronze Star Medal with two Oak Leaf Clusters	Purple Heart	World War I Victory Medal with two Battle Clasps
3rd Row	American Defense Service Medal with Foreign Service Clasp	American Campaign Medal	European-African-Middle Eastern Campaign Medal with four 3/16 inch service stars	World War II Victory Medal
4th Row	Army of Occupation Medal	Officer of the Legion of Honor (France)	French Croix de guerre 1939-1945 with Palm	Grand Officer of the Dutch Order of Orange-Nassau

Military offices
Preceded by Maxwell Murray	Commanding General 35th Infantry Division; 1943–1946	Succeeded by Post deactivated
