= Charles P. Hall =

United States Army general (1886–1953)

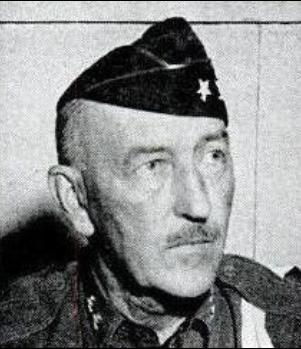
- Born: December 12, 1886; Sardis, Mississippi, United States
- Died: January 26, 1953 (aged 66); San Antonio, Texas, United States
- Burial place: Fort Sam Houston National Cemetery
- Military career
- Allegiance: United States
- Branch: United States Army
- Service years: 1911–1948
- Rank: Lieutenant General
- Nickname: "Chink"
- Service number: 0-3078
- Unit: Infantry Branch
- Commands: 11th Infantry Regiment; 3rd Infantry Division; 93rd Infantry Division; XI Corps
- Conflicts: World War I; Battle of Soissons; Battle of Château-Thierry; Battle of Saint-Mihiel; Second Battle of the Marne; World War II; Western New Guinea campaign; Battle of Morotai; Philippines Campaign; Battle of Leyte; Second Battle of Bataan; Occupation of Japan
- Awards: Distinguished Service Cross; Army Distinguished Service Medal (2); Silver Star (4); Bronze Star; Purple Heart

Lieutenant General Charles Philip Hall (December 12, 1886 – January 26, 1953) was a senior officer of the United States Army who fought in both World War I and World War II. He was the commander of XI Corps during World War II and the principal commander during the Battle of Bataan to liberate the Philippines from Japanese forces.

== Early career and World War I ==
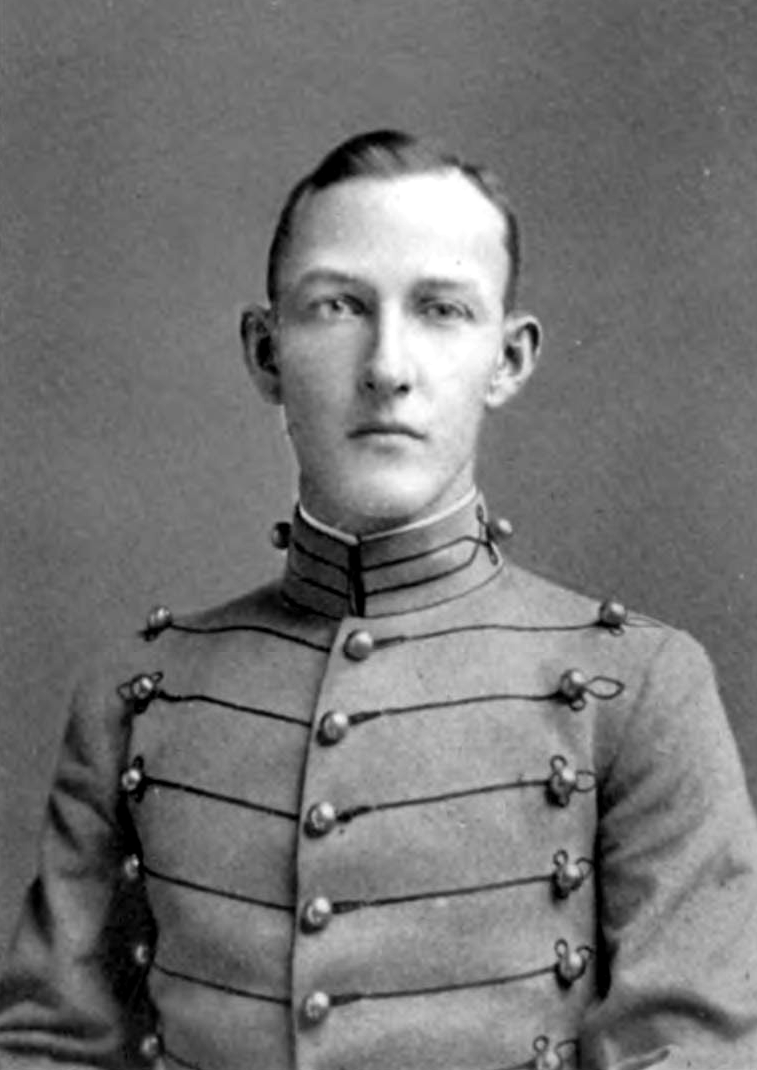
At West Point in 1911

Hall was born in Sardis, Mississippi, and attended the University of Mississippi from 1905 to 1907. He then entered the United States Military Academy (USMA) at West Point, New York, and was commissioned in 1911 as a second lieutenant in the Infantry Branch of the United States Army. Many of his classmates, such as Paul W. Baade, William H. H. Morris Jr., Alexander Surles, John R. Homer, Raymond A. Wheeler, John P. Lucas, Harry R. Kutz, Herbert Dargue, Ira T. Wyche, Karl S. Bradford, Frederick Gilbreath, Gustav H. Franke, Philip B. Fleming, Jesse A. Ladd, Thompson Lawrence, Bethel Wood Simpson, James B. Crawford, Joseph C. Mehaffey, Harold F. Nichols and James R.N. Weaver, became general officers before, during or after World War II

Hall initially served with the 20th Infantry Regiment until 1914, the year World War I began in Europe, when he returned to the USMA to become an instructor in mathematics.

In August 1917, four months after the American entry into World War I, he transferred to the 23rd Infantry Regiment, and then went to France as part of the American Expeditionary Forces (AEF). In March 1918, he became the adjutant of the 3rd Infantry Brigade, 2nd Infantry Division. He served at Verdun, Chateau Thierry, at Soissons in the Marne Offensive, in the St. Mihiel sector, and at Champagne in the Aisne Offensive.

Hall received the Army Distinguished Service Cross, second to the Medal of Honor, for extraordinary heroism in action at Vierzy, France on July 18, 1918. His citation read: "At a critical time in the battle, when information was difficult to obtain, Lieutenant Colonel Hall, Brigade Adjutant, volunteered to report on the fighting in Vierzy, which was then in the hands of the enemy. Accompanying a group of French tanks, he entered the town under intense fire; and, during the advance, went forward through machine-gun fire and carried to safety a wounded man. He assisted materially in maintaining organization among the troops and established a first aid station at which many wounded were cared for, returning later to Brigade Headquarters with valuable information."

In addition, Hall was awarded three Silver Star medals for gallantry. He also received the French Croix de Guerre for bravery on October 4, 1918, as well as the Legion of Honor.

== Between the wars ==
After service with the Army of Occupation until August 1919, Hall returned to the United States with the 2nd Division, remaining as brigade and then division adjutant until 1922. He served on the Infantry Board from 1922 to 1923, and was then a student at the Infantry School. From 1924 to 1925, he attended the Command and General Staff School at Fort Leavenworth, where he was a distinguished graduate. He then served as an instructor at the Infantry School until 1929, when he entered the Army War College.

After graduation from the Army War College in 1930, he spent two years in the Philippines. He then returned to Fort Benning as an instructor at the Infantry School from 1932 to 1937. From 1937 to 1940, he was Director of Ground Arms, Air Corps Tactical School, Maxwell Field, Alabama. In 1940, he took command of the 11th Infantry Regiment.

== World War II to retirement ==
In 1941–42, he served with the 3rd Infantry Division as assistant division commander and briefly as division commanding general. He then commanded the 93rd Infantry Division from May to October 1942.

In October 1942, he took command of XI Corps. He led the corps in combat in the Pacific War, fighting on New Guinea and at Morotai. The corps then fought at Leyte and on Luzon in the Philippine Campaign, most notably in the Battle of Bataan. Hall was designated to lead XI Corps ashore at Shibushi Bay in Operation Downfall, but this was prevented by the Surrender of Japan. In September 1945, the corps landed at Yokohama for the initial occupation of Japan. Hall relinquished command of the corps on March 15, 1946.

From March 1946 to December 1948, he served as the Director of Organization and Training on the War Department General Staff (from 1947 the Department of the Army). He retired on December 31, 1948, and was placed on the retired list as a lieutenant general on January 1, 1949. He died on January 26, 1953, in San Antonio, Texas, and was buried in the Fort Sam Houston National Cemetery.

== Decorations ==
Lieutenant General Charles P. Hall's decorations were:

1st Row	Distinguished Service Cross		Army Distinguished Service Medal with Oak Leaf Cluster	
2nd Row	Silver Star with three Oak Leaf Clusters	Bronze Star Medal	Purple Heart	World War I Victory Medal with four Battle Clasps
3rd Row	Army of Occupation of Germany Medal	American Defense Service Medal	American Campaign Medal	Asiatic Pacific Campaign Medal with seven service stars
4th Row	World War II Victory Medal	Army of Occupation Medal	Knight of the Legion of Honor (France)	Croix de Guerre 1914–1918 with Palm (France)
5th Row	Commander of the Philippine Legion of Honor	Philippine Liberation Medal with two Bronze Stars	Commander of the Egyptian Order of the Nile	Medal of Solidarity (Panama)

== Dates of rank ==
Insignia	Rank	Component	Date
No insignia	Cadet	United States Military Academy	June 15, 1907
No insignia in 1911	Second Lieutenant	Regular Army	June 13, 1911
	First Lieutenant	Regular Army	July 1, 1916
	Captain	Regular Army	May 15, 1917
	Major	National Army	May 17, 1918
	Lieutenant Colonel	National Army	May 6, 1919
	Captain	Regular Army	June 30, 1920 (Discharged and reverted to rank of captain.)
	Major	Regular Army	July 1, 1920
	Lieutenant Colonel	Regular Army	August 1, 1935
	Colonel	Regular Army	March 1, 1940
	Brigadier General	Army of the United States	January 29, 1941
	Major General	Army of the United States	March 9, 1942
	Lieutenant General	Army of the United States	June 4, 1945
	Brigadier General	Regular Army	June 1, 1946
	Major General	Regular Army	February 1, 1947
	Lieutenant General	Retired List	January 1, 1949

== Bibliography ==
- Taaffe, Stephen R. (2013). Marshall and His Generals: U.S. Army Commanders in World War II. Lawrence, Kansas: University Press of Kansas. ISBN 978-0-7006-1942-9. OCLC 840162019.

Military offices
Preceded by Walter C. Sweeney Sr.	Commanding General 3rd Infantry Division; 1941–1942	Succeeded by John P. Lucas
Preceded by Newly activated organization	Commanding General 93rd Infantry Division; 1945–1946	Succeeded by Fred W. Miller
Preceded by Lloyd Fredendall	Commanding General XI Corps; 1942–1946	Succeeded by Post deactivated
