= Frederick Gilbreath =

United States Army general

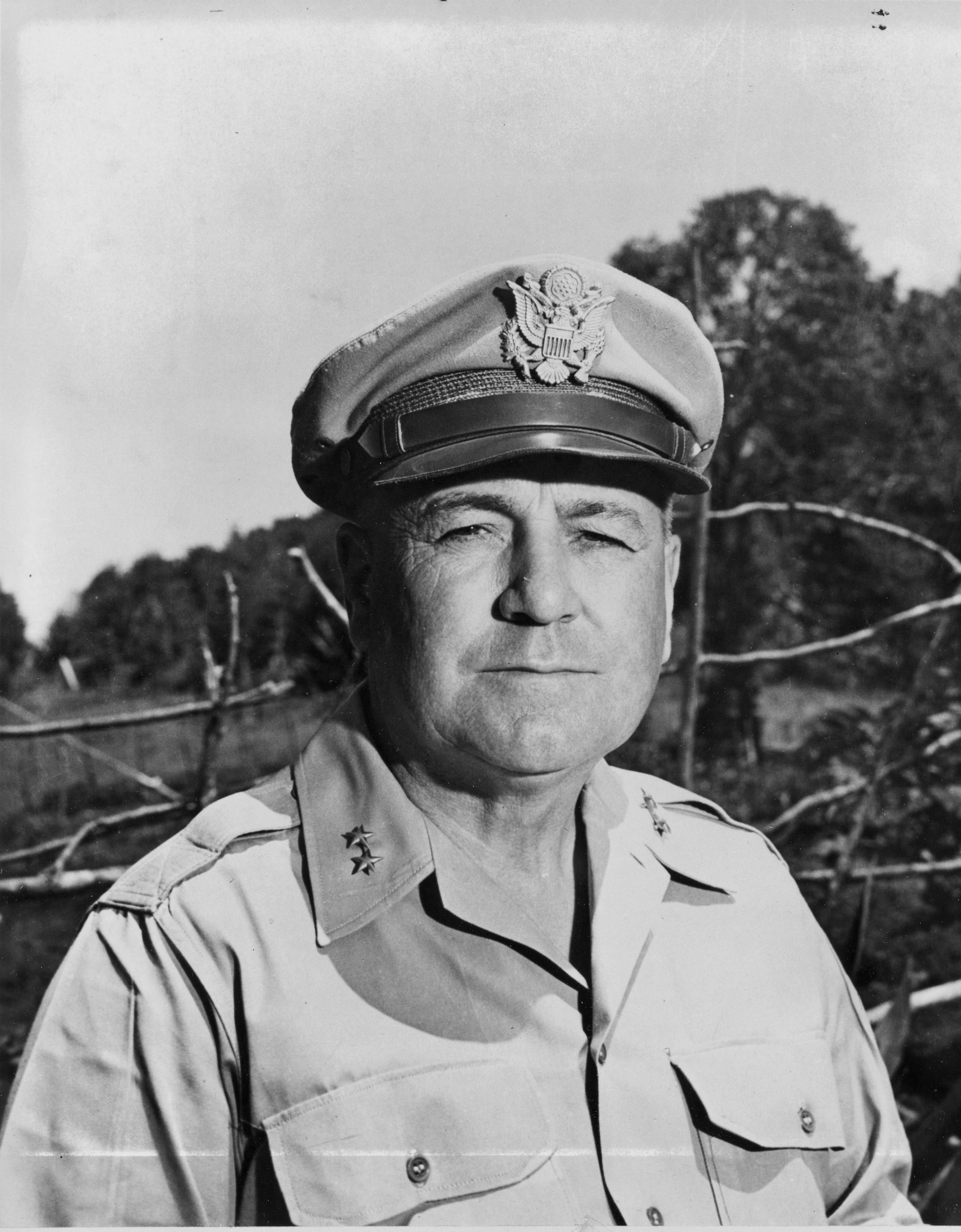
- Major General Frederick Gilbreath
- Born: 21 February 1888; Dayton, Washington Territory
- Died: 28 February 1969 (aged 81); Austin, Texas
- Burial place: Fort Sam Houston National Cemetery
- Military career
- Allegiance: United States
- Branch: United States Cavalry
- Service years: 1911–1946
- Rank: Major General
- Service number: 0-3086
- Conflicts: Philippine–American War; World War I World War II
- Awards: Distinguished Service Medal; Bronze Star Medal

Frederick Gilbreath (21 February 1888 – 28 February 1969) was a general officer in the United States Army who commanded the San Francisco Port of Embarkation and the South Pacific Base Command during World War II.

== Early life ==
Frederick Gilbreath was born on 21 February 1888 on a farm near Dayton in what was then the Washington Territory. He was the youngest of thirteen children of Samuel Love Gilbreath and his wife Margaret née Fanning. His parents had traversed the Oregon Trail with their families in wagon trains in 1852, and had moved to the Washington Territory after their marriage in 1859. Gilbreath grew up on the family farm. He was educated at Columbia County Grade School and Dayton High School.

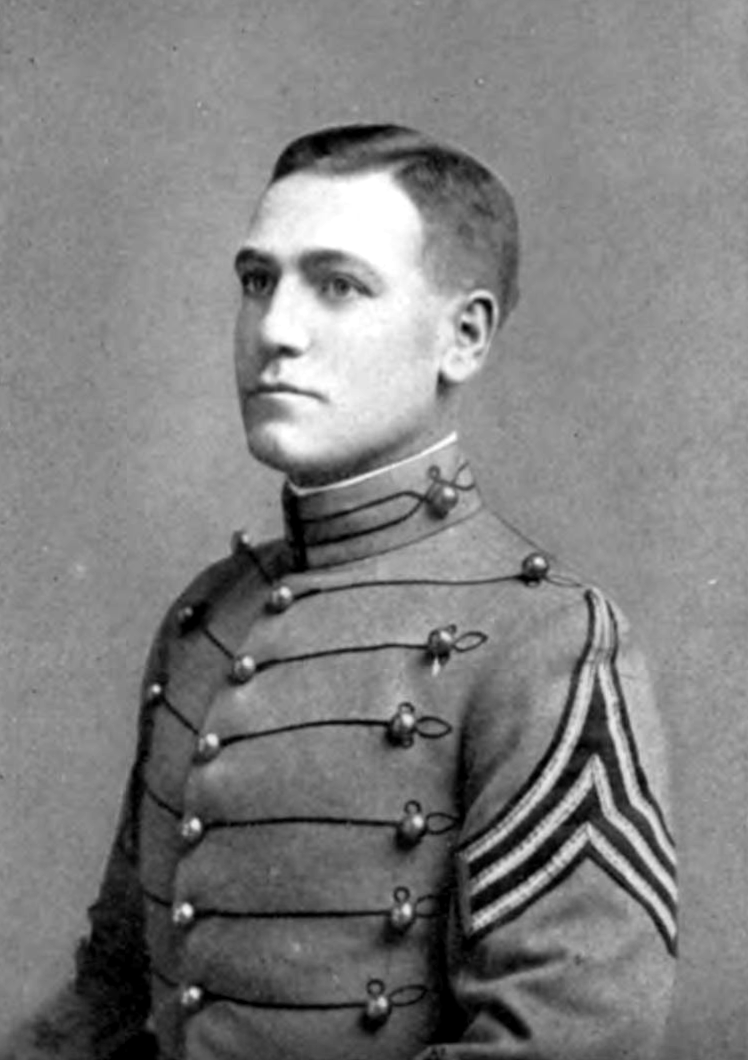
At West Point in 1911

After graduating from high school in 1905, Gilbreath entered Whitman College in Walla Walla, Washington. He was appointed to the United States Military Academy at West Point, New York by Levi Ankeny, the United States Senator for the state of Washington. Gilbreath entered West Point on 15 June 1907. He became an acting first sergeant and cadet lieutenant, and played basketball, lacrosse and polo.

Gilbreath graduated 32d in the class of 1911, and was commissioned as a second lieutenant in the United States Cavalry on 13 June 1911. His fellow graduates included numerous future general officers, such as Charles P. Hall, Herbert Dargue, Paul W. Baade, Ira T. Wyche, William H. H. Morris Jr., John P. Lucas, John R. Homer, Jesse A. Ladd, Thompson Lawrence, Alexander Surles, Raymond Albert Wheeler, Karl Slaughter Bradford, Gustave H. Franke, Harold F. Nichols, James R.N. Weaver, Joseph Cowles Mehaffey and Philip Bracken Fleming.

He was posted to the 14th Cavalry, which was then at Camp Stotsenburg in the Philippines. He sailed for the United States on 8 March 1912, but got only as far as Nagasaki when he was ordered to return five days later. He was attached to the 7th Cavalry at Fort William McKinley until 22 April 1912, when he transferred to the 8th Cavalry. He served in the Philippine–American War on Jolo, and then at Camp Stotsenburg and Fort William McKinley. For his service in the Philippines, he was awarded the Bronze Star Medal.

== World War I ==
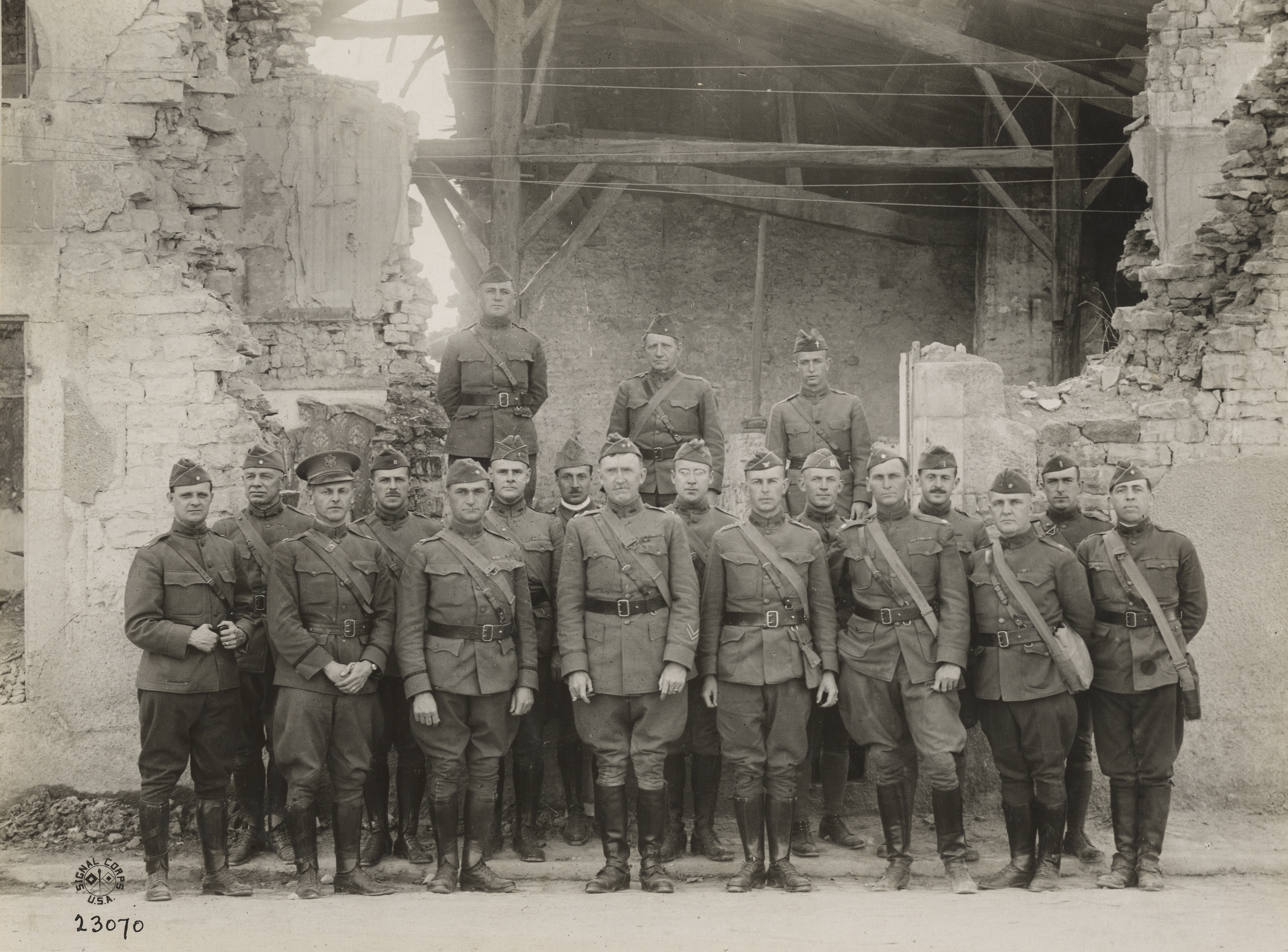
Major General John L. Hines, commanding the 4th Division, and members of his divisional staff at Haudainville, Meuse, France, September 15, 1918. Stood in the top row on the far left is the division's quartermaster, Major Frederick Gilbreath.

On 15 September 1914, Gilbreath again embarked for the United States, this time reaching it. He was assigned to the 14th Cavalry, which was then stationed at Fort McIntosh, Texas, near the Mexican border, on 20 January 1915. He was promoted to first lieutenant on 1 July 1916, and was commandant of cadets and Professor of Military Science and Tactics at the University of Puerto Rico from 3 October 1916 to 1 January 1917. He returned to the United States for further service on the Mexican border with the 17th Cavalry at Fort Bliss, Texas and then Douglas, Arizona. He married Edna Brown of Laredo on 22 December 1916.

Gilbreath was promoted to captain in the Cavalry on 15 May 1917, a few weeks after the American entry into World War I, but was transferred to the Quartermaster Corps on 25 July 1917. He was the Chief Disbursing Officer for U.S. Troops in England from 2 September 1917 to 20 October 1917. Moving to France, he was executive officer of Base Section No. 1 at St. Nazaire from 2 November 1o 25 December 1917. After a stint as assistant G-1 of I Corps, he was assistant quartermaster of the 2d Division from 9 April to 25 June 1918, and then the quartermaster of the 4th Division until 30 October. He was promoted to major in the Cavalry on 7 June 1918, lieutenant colonel in the Quartermaster Corps on 11 October 1918, and colonel in the Quartermaster Corps on 5 May 1919, by which time the war had ended due to the Armistice with Germany. He was Assistant Chief of Supplies Division at Tours and then Paris, from 1 November 1918 to 30 April 1919, and then Chief of Supply Division until 25 September 1919.

== Between the wars ==
After a leave of absence, Gilbreath was posted to Washington, D.C., as assistant to the Director of Storage in the office of the Quartermaster General from 16 November 1919 until 31 May 1920, and then as the chief of Administration Division of the Storage Service until 30 June 1920. He reverted to his permanent rank of captain on 30 June 1920, but was transferred to the Quartermaster Corps with the rank of major the following day. He was posted to San Antonio, Texas, as the quartermaster at the San Antonio Depot until 1 September 1921. He attended the School of the Line at Fort Leavenworth, Kansas, and then the Command and General Staff College there in 1922. He transferred back to the Cavalry on 31 March 1925, and attended the Army War College, graduating on 30 June 1927.

Gilbreath served with the 2d Cavalry at Fort Riley, Kansas, and then was posted to Washington, D.C., on 15 August 1928 for duty on the War Department General Staff. He returned to Fort Bliss for duty with the 1st Cavalry Division from 15 September 1932 to 1 June 1934, and then at Fort Riley from 4 June 1934 to 5 June 1935. While he was there, he became a member of the Masters of Foxhounds Association of America. Colonel Jonathan M. Wainwright, the assistant Commandant of the Cavalry School there and the Master of the Cavalry School Hunt, invited him to become joint Master. When it came time for him to leave Fort Riley, Wainwright gave him a fox horn and a sporting brake, a two-horse, two-seated open light vehicle. He later donated it to the Frontier Museum at Fort Leavenworth. Gilbreath became executive officer of the Command and General Staff College there on 5 June 1935, and was promoted to lieutenant colonel on 1 August 1935. On 1 August 1939, he returned to Fort Riley as assistant commandant of the Cavalry School.

== World War II ==
Promoted to colonel in the Cavalry on 30 April 1940, Gilbreath commanded the 7th Cavalry at Fort Bliss from 1 August 1940 to 1 May 1941. He was then appointed Deputy Commander of the San Francisco Port of Embarkation on 5 May 1941 and Commander on 14 November 1941, with the rank of brigadier general in the Army of the United States from 15 December 1941, and major general from 7 September 1942. The San Francisco Port of Embarkation was the main port responsible for the support of units in the Southwest Pacific Area, through which all troops and supplies to the theater flowed. For his services he was awarded the Army Distinguished Service Medal, the citation for which reads:

The President of the United States of America, authorized by Act of Congress July 9, 1918, takes pleasure in presenting the Army Distinguished Service Medal to Major General Frederick Gilbreath (ASN: 0-3086), United States Army, for exceptionally meritorious and distinguished services to the Government of the United States, in a duty of great responsibility, as Commanding General, San Francisco Port of Embarkation, during the period from 18 December 1941 to 12 June 1944.

On 10 August 1944, he became commander of the South Pacific Base Command. He then became commander of the Army Service Command in the Philippines. This moved to Japan after the war ended.

== Later life ==
Gilbreath retired from the army with the rank of major general on 31 August 1946. He moved to Austin, Texas, where he died on 28 February 1969, and was buried with full military honors at the Fort Sam Houston National Cemetery on 3 March.
