= Walter J. Donnelly =

American diplomat (1896–1970)

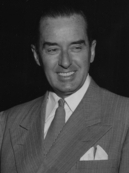
Donnelly in 1951

Walter Joseph Donnelly (January 9, 1896 – November 13, 1970) was an American diplomat. He served as Ambassador to Costa Rica, Venezuela, Germany, among others.

== Biography ==
Born in New Haven, Connecticut, Donnelly served in the United States Army during World War I. He went to the Central University of Venezuela and then to the Edmund A. Walsh School of Foreign Service at Georgetown University.

== Career ==
He served as United States Ambassador to Costa Rica. During 1947–1950, he was made ambassador of Venezuela and he settled in Venezuela again in 1951, this time as the representative of U.S. Steel in South America. On July 18, 1952, he was nominated by then President, Harry Truman, as High Commissioner to Austria. From August 1, 1952, until December 11, 1952, Donnelly served as High Commissioner of the United States in Germany.

== See also ==
- United States Ambassador to Austria
- United States Ambassador to Costa Rica
- United States Ambassador to Venezuela

Diplomatic posts
Preceded by Hallett Johnson	United States Ambassador to Costa Rica; 1947	Succeeded by Nathaniel Penistone Davis
Preceded by Frank P. Corrigan	United States Ambassador to Venezuela; 1947-1950	Succeeded by Norman Armour
Preceded by post created	United States Ambassador to Austria; 1951-1952	Succeeded by Llewellyn Thompson
