= Walter C. Thurston =

American diplomat (1894–1974)

Walter Clarence Thurston (1894–1974) was an American diplomat who served in Mexico, Guatemala, Nicaragua, the United Kingdom, Costa Rica, Brazil, Paraguay, Switzerland, Spain, Portugal and the Soviet Union. He also served as ambassador to El Salvador, Bolivia and Mexico.

Diplomatic posts
Preceded by himself	United States Ambassador to El Salvador; 1943–1944	Succeeded by John F. Simmons
Preceded by Pierre de Lagarde Boal	United States Ambassador to Bolivia; 1944–1946	Succeeded by Joseph Flack
