= Nathaniel P. Davis =

American diplomat (1895–1973)

Nathaniel Penistone Davis
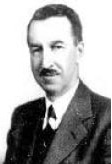

United States Minister to Hungary
- In office September 1, 1949 – May 18, 1951
- Preceded by: Selden Chapin
- Succeeded by: Christian M. Ravndal

United States Ambassador to Costa Rica
- In office January 31, 1948 – June 8, 1949
- Preceded by: Walter J. Donnelly
- Succeeded by: Joseph Flack

Personal details
- Born: May 1, 1895 Princeton, New Jersey, U.S.
- Died: September 12, 1973 (aged 78) Winter Park, Florida, U.S.
- Spouse: Sarah Louise Collins (m. 1919)
- Education: Princeton University (B.A.)

Nathaniel Penistone Davis (May 1, 1895 – September 12, 1973) was an American career diplomat.

Davis received his B.A. from Princeton University in 1916 and joined the Foreign Service in 1919. He served as Consul in Recife (then Pernambuco), Brazil, from 1926–29, then as Vice Consul in London. He was appointed Consul in London in 1929. He returned to State Department assignments in Washington, DC, an inspection tour of US diplomatic missions in South America, and a subsequent inspection tour of United States diplomatic missions in the Far East. He was interned in Manila, Philippines from 1942–43.

Davis returned to the Philippines in 1946 as the State Department representative on the staff of the U.S. High Commissioner in the Philippines during the U.S. military occupation. He remained after the independence of the Philippines as Counselor at the U.S. Embassy in Manila from 1946–47.

He was American ambassador to Costa Rica from 1947–49, including during the Costa Rican Civil War. He was United States Minister to Hungary from 1949–51.

Diplomatic relations between the US and Hungary were downgraded during the Cold War, and there was no US Ambassador to Hungary during that time. The Minister was the chief of the U.S. diplomatic mission.

During his time as Minister to Hungary, he handled negotiations with the government of Hungary which led to the release of Robert A. Vogeler, an American citizen and Vice President and representative for Eastern Europe of the International Telephone and Telegraph Co. (ITT) who was arrested in Hungary and tried and convicted as a spy.

Davis was awarded the Medal of Freedom in 1946, and the Distinguished Service Award on his retirement from the State Department in 1951.

In 1952, after his retirement, he returned to Washington for a month to conduct a confidential review, at the request of Secretary of State Dean Acheson, of the record of O. Edmund Clubb, a U.S. diplomat who had been accused of being a Communist sympathizer by Senator Joseph R. McCarthy. On the basis of Davis' report that Clubb was not a security risk, Acheson overturned the decision against Clubb by the State Department's loyalty board, and restored Clubb's pension.

== Personal life ==
Davis was born in Princeton, New Jersey on May 1, 1895, the son of John D. Davis (Professor at Princeton Theological Seminary and author of Davis' Bible Dictionary) and Marguerite (Scobie) Davis, grandson of Robert and Anne Williams (Shaw) Davis, and great-grandson of John and Anna Maria (Johnston) Davis.

He was married in 1919 to Sarah Louise Collins. After his retirement, he lived in Glens Falls and Silver Bay, New York, and later in Winter Park, Florida. He died in Winter Park on September 12, 1973, aged 78.

His autobiography, Few Dull Moments: A Foreign Service Career, was self-published in 1967. His papers are in the Harry S. Truman Library and Museum in Independence, Missouri.

Diplomatic posts
Preceded by Walter J. Donnelly	United States Ambassador to Costa Rica; 1948–1949	Succeeded by Joseph Flack
