= Joseph Flack =

American diplomat

Joseph Flack (December 5, 1894 – May 8, 1955) was an American diplomat who served as ambassador to Bolivia, Costa Rica, and Poland.

He was born in Grenoble, Pennsylvania, the son of Roland Flack and Sallie R. Walter Flack.

Diplomatic posts
Preceded by Walter C. Thurston	United States Ambassador to Bolivia; 1946 – 1949	Succeeded by Irving Florman
Preceded by Nathaniel Penistone Davis	United States Ambassador to Costa Rica; 1949 – 1950	Succeeded by Philip Bracken Fleming
Preceded by Waldemar J. Gallman	United States Ambassador to Poland; 1950 – 1955	Succeeded by Joseph E. Jacobs
