= XI Corps (United States) =

- 1942-1968 Shoulder sleeve insignia of XI Corps
- Active: 29 July 1921–1 October 1933; 1 October 1933–11 March 1946; 25 March 1948–21 January 1968
- Country: United States of America
- Branch: United States Army
- Role: Headquarters
- Size: Corps
- Engagements: World War II; New Guinea; Luzon; Southern Philippines

Commanders
- Notable commanders: Charles P. Hall

Insignia
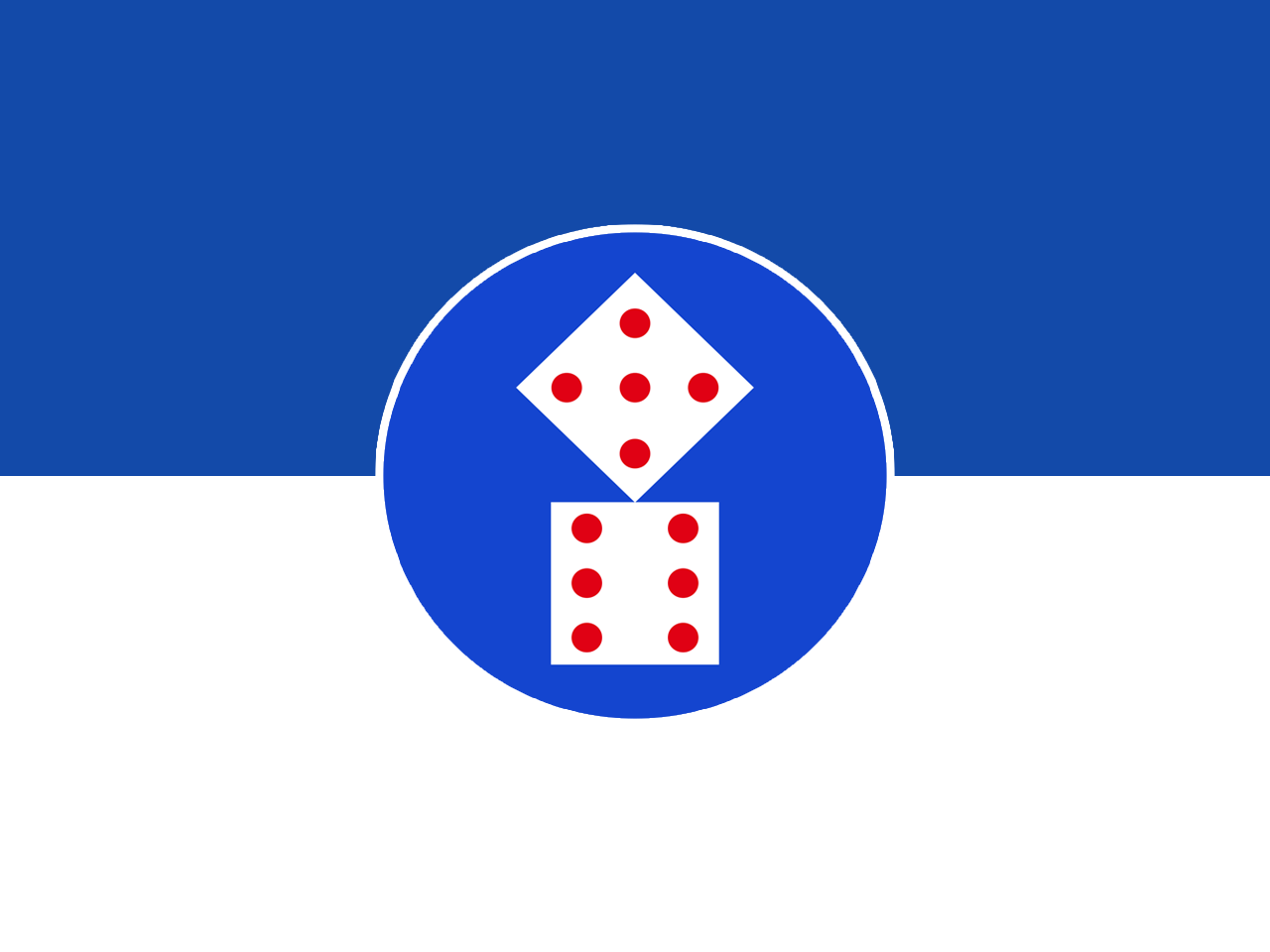
- XI Corps Flag

XI Corps was a corps of the United States Army in World War II.

== History ==
=== Interwar period ===
==== XI Corps (I) ====
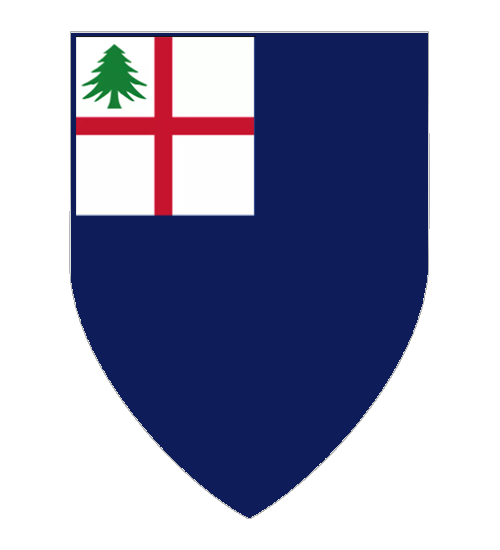
XI Corps SSI Patch 1922-1933 Interwar Year Period

The XI Corps was authorized by the National Defense Act of 1920, and was to be composed of units of the Organized Reserve located primarily in the First Corps Area. The headquarters and headquarters company were constituted on 29 July 1921 in the Regular Army, allotted to the First Corps Area, and assigned to the Fourth Army. The headquarters was activated about 24 October 1921 with Regular Army and Organized Reserve personnel at the Custom House Tower in Boston, Massachusetts. The headquarters company was initiated at Boston about December 1922. For annual summer training, the corps headquarters planned and conducted an officers’ training school 3–15 September 1922 and a staff training exercise in July 1924 at Camp Devens, Massachusetts. The headquarters was relieved from active duty in 1925 and all Regular Army personnel were reassigned to the Headquarters, Non-Divisional Group, First Corps Area, which assumed the responsibilities previously held by the XI Corps. Both the headquarters and the headquarters company remained active as "Regular Army Inactive" units. The headquarters was withdrawn from the Regular Army on 1 October 1933 and demobilized.

In 1922, the XI Corps received a shoulder sleeve insignia: “The shoulder sleeve insignia of The New England Reserve Corps, the XI, is truly historic, for it is a clever adaption of the famous Bunker Hill flag, a blue shield with the cross of St. George and the defiant green pine tree.”

==== XI Corps (II) ====
The second iteration of the XI Corps was constituted in the Organized Reserve on 1 October 1933, allotted to the First Corps Area, and assigned to the First Army. The headquarters was concurrently organized with the Reserve personnel previously assigned to the previously demobilized XI Corps (RAI). The designated mobilization station was Camp Devens, where the corps headquarters would assume command and control of the subordinate corps troops, which would then be mobilizing throughout the First Corps Area. The XI Corps was not activated prior to World War II, and was located in Boston as of 7 December 1941 in a reserve status.

=== World War II ===
The XI Army Corps was activated on 15 June 1942 at Chicago, Illinois and was redesignated XI Corps on 19 August 1942. On 20 October 1942 Major General (later Lieutenant General) Charles P. Hall assumed command of the Corps. General Hall commanded the Corps until its disbandment.

XI Corps embarked for the South West Pacific Area in March 1944 and was assigned to the Alamo Force after arriving at Finschhafen, New Guinea.

After service in New Guinea, XI Corps participated in the liberation of the Philippines and fought in Luzon, and the Southern Philippines. In the Philippines the Corps was under the Eighth United States Army commanded by Lieutenant General (later General) Robert L. Eichelberger.

In the Philippines, XI Corps' subordinate units included the following:

- 23rd Infantry Division (a.k.a. Americal Division)
- 31st Infantry Division
- 41st Infantry Division
- 93rd Infantry Division (African-American)
- 503rd Parachute Infantry Regiment
- 38th Infantry Division

After the Japanese surrender on 2 September 1945, the Corps moved to occupation duty in and around Yokohama, Japan. It was disbanded on 11 March 1946 at Mito, Japan.

Reactivated 22 November 1957 at St. Louis, Missouri and inactivated a final time 21 January 1968.

A unit history named Paradise Parade was published by the XI Corps Public Relations Office in 1945.

== Campaign credit ==
- New Guinea
- Luzon
- Southern Philippines
