= Raymond Albert Wheeler =

United States Army general (1885–1974)

Raymond Albert Wheeler KBE KCIE
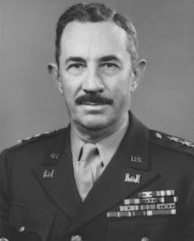
- Official photo as a lieutenant general
- Born: Raymond Albert Wheeler; 31 July 1885; Peoria, Illinois, United States
- Died: 9 February 1974 (aged 88); Walter Reed Army Medical Center, Washington, D.C., United States
- Burial place: Arlington National Cemetery
- Alma mater: United States Military Academy (BS); United States Army Engineer School; United States Army Command and General Staff College (MS); United States Army War College (MS)
- Spouses: Olive Keithley (m. 1912; died 1954) Virginia Morsey (m. 1959)
- Children: 1
- Military career
- Allegiance: United States
- Branch: United States Army
- Service years: 1911–1949
- Rank: Lieutenant general
- Nickname: "Speck"
- Service number: 0-3064
- Unit: United States Army Corps of Engineers
- Commands: Chief of Engineers; Commanding general of the India-Burma theater of operations Acting Governor of the Panama Canal Zone
- Conflicts: Veracruz Expedition; World War I World War II
- Awards: Distinguished Service Medal (4); Silver Star; Legion of Merit

Raymond Albert Wheeler (31 July 1885 – 9 February 1974) was a lieutenant general in the United States Army Corps of Engineers and an engineer of international recognition. He fought in both World Wars, at the Marne in World War I, where he earned a Silver Star, and in the South-East Asian Theatre of World War II, where he personally accepted the Japanese surrender in Singapore. During and after the war he held key roles in major engineering projects of the 20th century, to include construction of the Ledo Road, St. Lawrence Seaway, and Missouri Basin Program, the clearing of the Suez Canal during the Suez Crisis, and the construction of tens of thousands of miles of rail and highway through Iraq and Iran during the development of Allied supply lines from Europe to Russia during World War II.

== Life and career ==
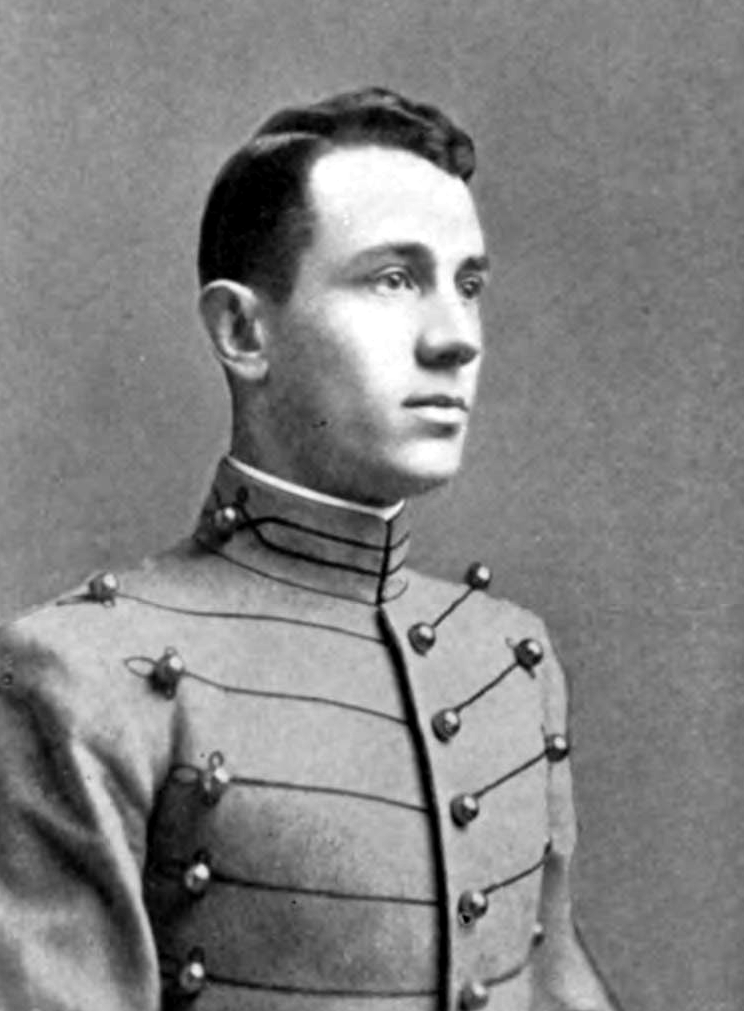
At West Point in 1911

He was born to Stephen and Margaret (née Maple) Wheeler in Peoria, Illinois on 31 July 1885. He attended the United States Military Academy, graduating 5th of 82 in his class in 1911, subsequently participating in the construction of the Panama Canal and working on engineering projects in Mexico with Douglas MacArthur, who was then a captain in the Corps of Engineers.

He attended the United States Army War College from 1936 to 1937.

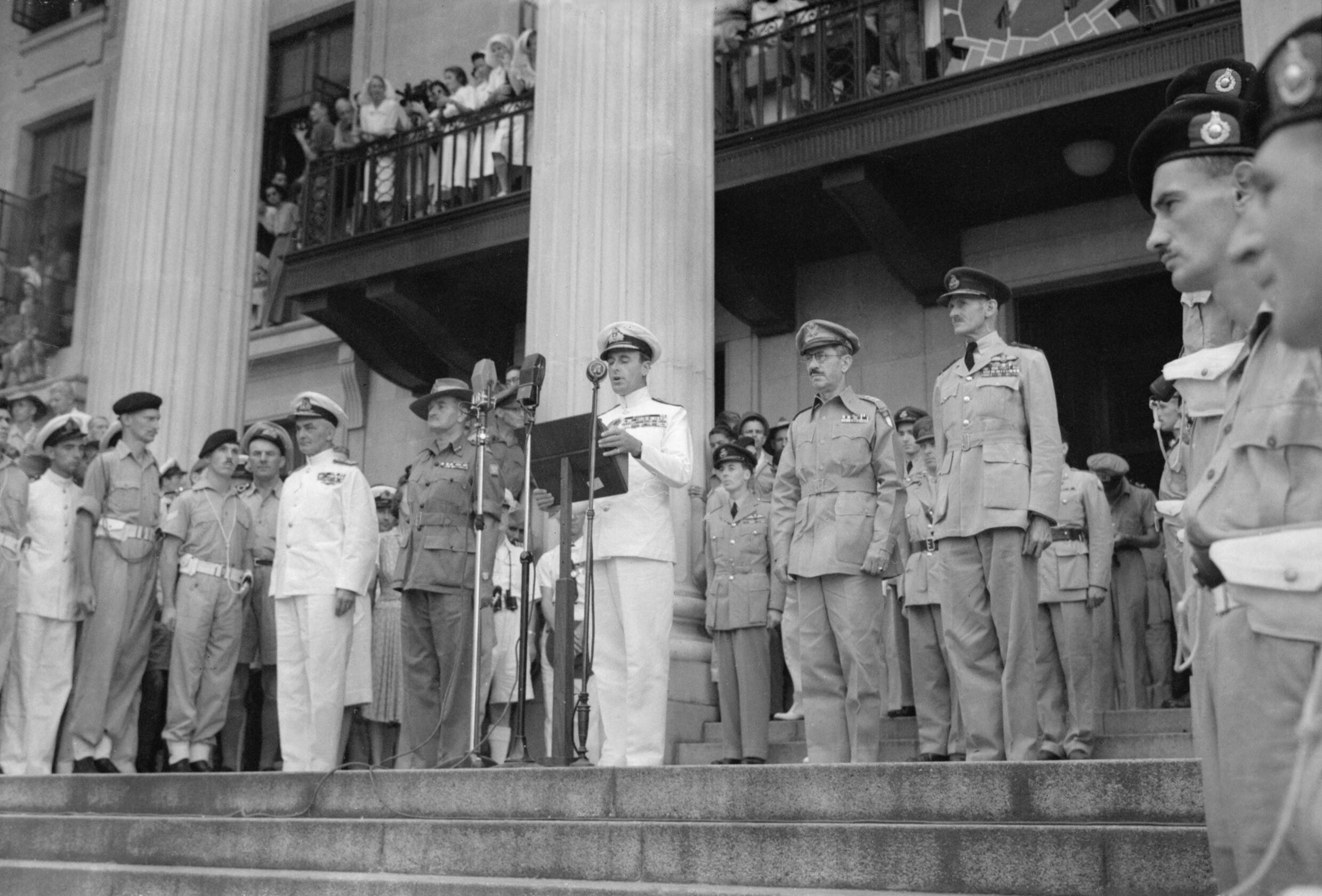
Wheeler (4th from left on the dais) at the Japanese Surrender at Singapore, 1945

At the time the United States entered World War II, Wheeler was developing a transportation network in the Middle East to ship munitions to the Soviet Union, which involved the extensive rebuilding of the railroads and highways of Iraq and Iran. In autumn 1943, he was appointed to the South East Asia Command (SEAC) of the South-East Asian Theatre of World War II on the staff of Admiral Lord Louis Mountbatten, Supreme Allied Commander South East Asia, where he served as principal administrative officer and directed construction of the Ledo Road. From February 1944, he served as Deputy Supreme Allied Commander South East Asia, replacing General "Vinegar Joe" Stilwell, and was the United States representative in August 1945 at the Japanese surrender in Singapore.

He served as Chief of Engineers for the United States Army Corps of Engineers from 4 October 1945 to 28 February 1949, managing major projects including the St. Lawrence Seaway and the Missouri Valley Development. Following his retirement from the Army in 1949, Wheeler joined the International Bank for Reconstruction and Development as an engineering consultant; among the projects he was consulted on was a 9,000-mile survey of Indus basin water resources. He commanded the United Nations Suez Canal Clearance Operations following the 1956 Suez Crisis.

== Awards and honors ==
=== Military ===
Wheeler's military awards included the Silver Star, the Air Medal, an Army Distinguished Service Medal with three Oak Leaf Clusters and the Legion of Merit.

He fought in France during World War I, for which he was awarded the Silver Star and a Distinguished Service Medal.

External color images
- Lieutenant General Wheeler of the South East Asia Command, sitting at his desk during World War II, March 1945
- Lieutenant General Wheeler on a telephone in March 1945

=== Government ===
In 1945 Wheeler received the honorary title Knight Commander of the Most Excellent Order of the British Empire (KBE, Military Division).

1947, he was honored as Knight Commander of the Most Eminent Order of the Indian Empire (KCIE) for his construction of the Ledo Road.

=== Professional societies ===
For his work in clearing the Suez Canal, the American Society of Mechanical Engineers awarded Wheeler the Hoover Medal in 1958. The award's citation described Wheeler as a man who:

typifies all that is best in leadership, training, experienced judgment, character and warm friendship in both the military engineer and the civilian engineer. His accomplishments throughout his life are outstanding, have brought great credit to his chosen profession, and mark him an eminent engineer of national and international recognition. His significant contributions include the monumental task of clearing the Suez Canal.

He was made a member of the American Institute of Mining, Metallurgical, and Petroleum Engineers, American Society of Mechanical Engineers, and the Institute of Electrical and Electronics Engineers (I.E.E.E.), vice president of the Society of American Military Engineers for 1949, and a member of the board of review of the British Columbia Hydro and Power Authority. He was also a member of the chairman advisory board of the Mekong River Survey Mission in Cambodia, Laos, Thailand, and Vietnam, from 1960-1969, and an honorary member of American International Assurance.

== Death ==
Wheeler died on 9 February 1974 at the Walter Reed Army Medical Center in Washington, D.C. and was buried in Arlington National Cemetery.

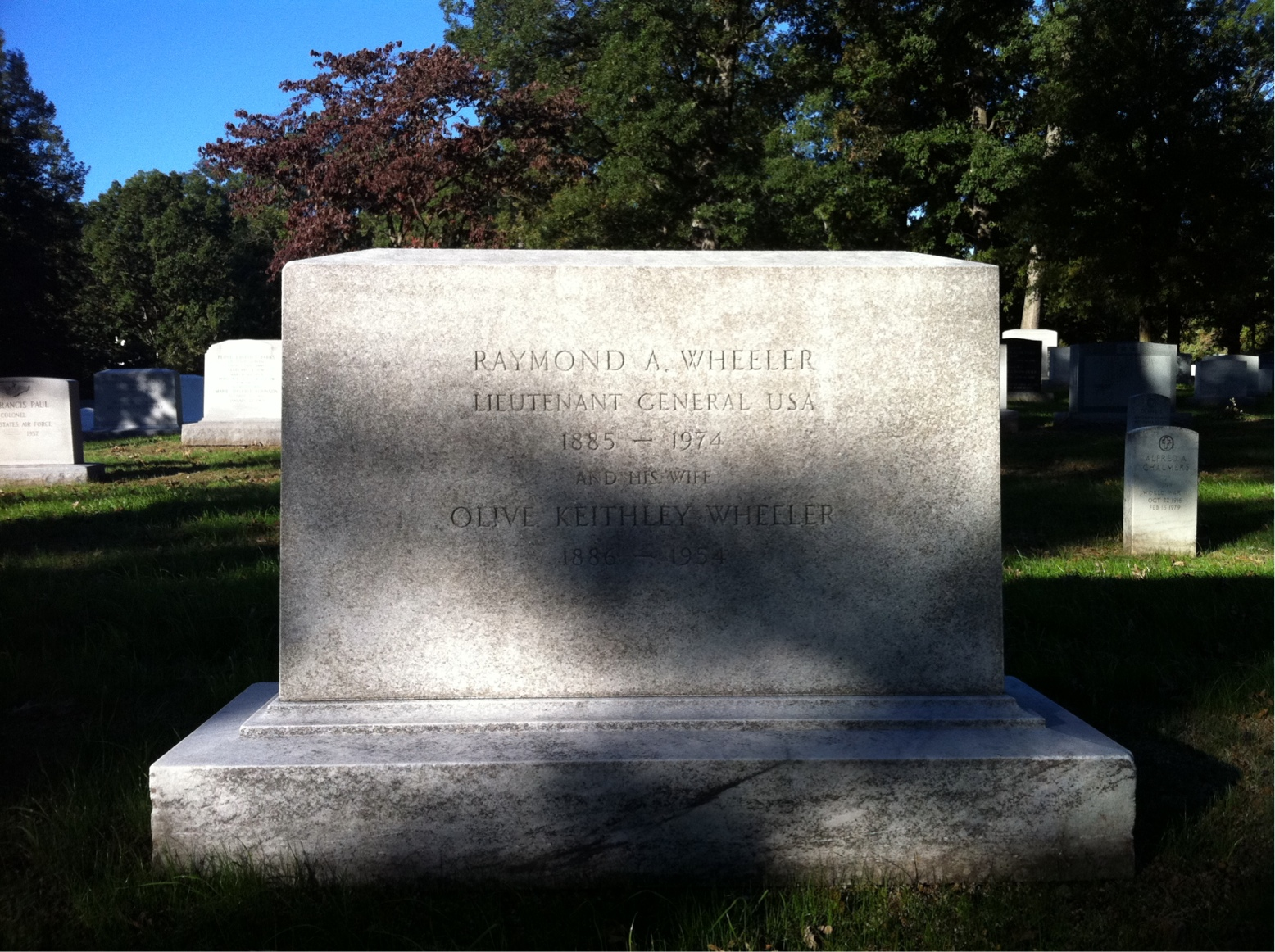
Grave at Arlington National Cemetery

== Dates of rank ==
Insignia	Rank	Component	Date
No insignia	Cadet	United States Military Academy	15 June 1907
No pin insignia at the time	Second lieutenant	Regular Army	13 June 1911
	First lieutenant	Regular Army	3 September 1913
	Captain	Regular Army	1 July 1916
	Colonel	National Army	2 November (accepted 6 November) 1918
	Major	Regular Army	5 August 1917 (temporary); 1 July 1920 (permanent)
	Lieutenant colonel	Regular Army	11 July 1918 (temporary); 1 August 1935 (permanent)
	Colonel	Regular Army	1 February 1940
	Brigadier general	Army of the United States	29 September 1941
	Major general	Army of the United States	11 March 1942
	Lieutenant general	Army of the United States	21 February 1944
	Major general	Regular Army	1 October (accepted 4 October) 1945
	Major general	Regular Army, Retired	24 January 1948
	Lieutenant general	Regular Army, Retired	1 March 1949

== See also ==
- China Burma India Theater of World War II
- Major General Albert Coady Wedemeyer
- Lieutenant General Daniel Isom Sultan

Military offices
Preceded by Eugene Reybold	Chief of Engineers; 1945—1949	Succeeded by Lewis A. Pick
