= James R. N. Weaver =

United States Army general

James Roy Newman Weaver
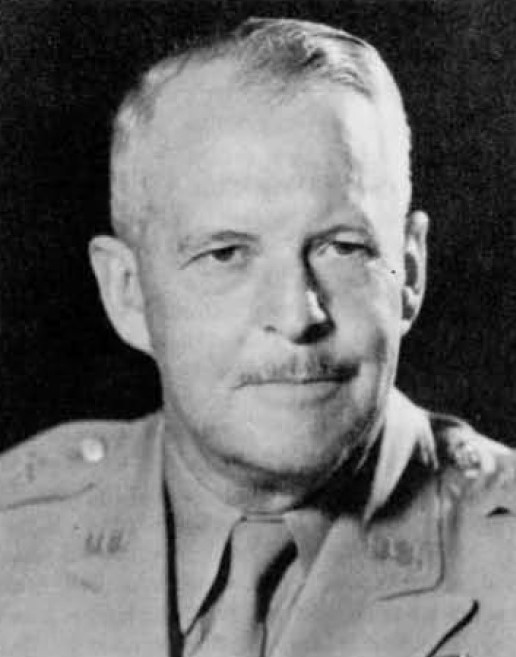
- Born: May 20, 1888; Fremont, Ohio
- Died: August 29, 1967 (aged 79); Menlo Park, California
- Burial place: San Francisco National Cemetery
- Military career
- Allegiance: United States of America
- Branch: United States Army
- Service years: 1911–1948
- Rank: Brigadier General
- Nickname: Gentleman Jim
- Commands: Camp Beale; Fort Ord; Provisional Tank Group, USAFFE; 2nd Armored Division (Acting); 68th Armored Regiment; 2nd Battalion, 66th Infantry; 3rd Battalion, 5th Infantry; Battalion, 333rd Infantry
- Conflicts: Battle of Bataan
- Awards: Distinguished Service Cross; Distinguished Service Medal; Silver Star; Bronze Star; Purple Heart; Prisoner of War Medal

James Roy Newman Weaver (May 20, 1888 – August 29, 1967) was an American brigadier general and commander of the Provisional Tank Group during the Battle of Bataan.

== Biography ==
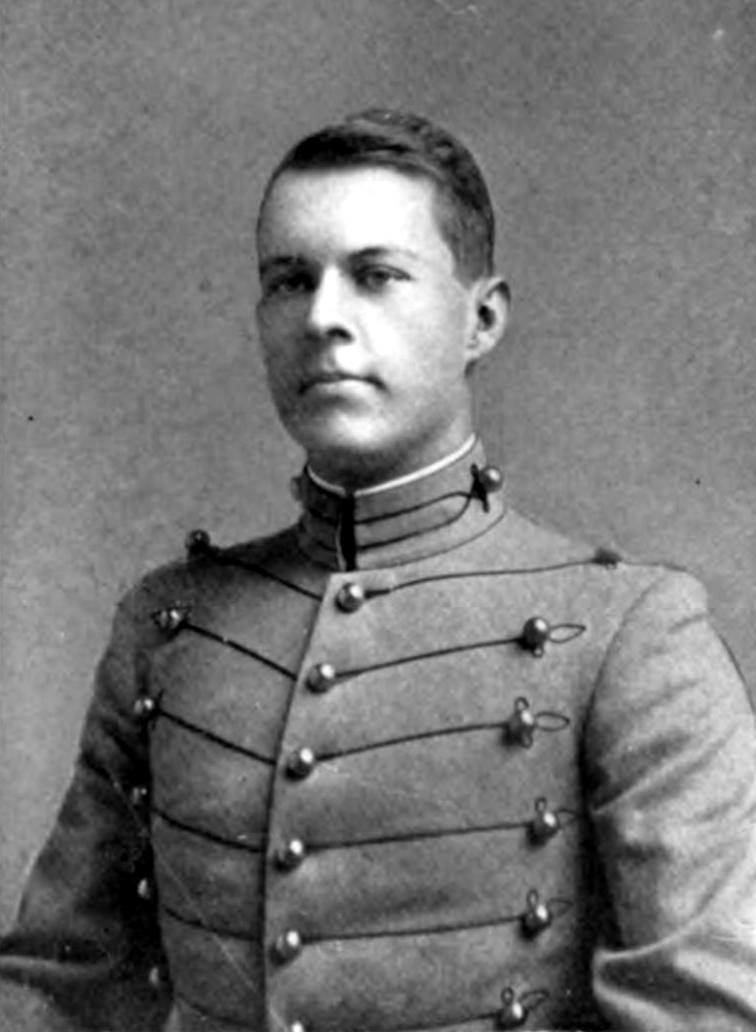
At West Point in 1911

James R. N. Weaver was born in Fremont, Ohio on May 20, 1888. He attended Fremont High School, where he was president and valedictorian of the Class of 1906.

Weaver attended Oberlin College for a year, and graduated 52 of 82 from the United States Military Academy at West Point in June 1911. He later taught at West Point from 1917 to 1918 and again from 1920 to 1924.

After commissioning, Weaver served with the 9th Infantry and the 8th Infantry in the Philippines and on the Mexican border near Laredo, Texas. He was promoted to captain in May 1917.

During World War I, Weaver received a temporary promotion to major in June 1918 and briefly commanded a battalion of the 333rd Infantry, 84th Division at Camp Mills on Long Island in August 1918. His promotion to major expired in March 1920 and then was made permanent in June 1920.

Weaver graduated from the Infantry School advanced course in June 1925, the Command and General Staff School in June 1926 and the Army War College in June 1933. He taught infantry tactics at the Field Artillery School from July 1926 to June 1930.

Weaver served at Fort McKinley in Maine from 1930 to 1932 and commanded the 3rd Battalion, 5th Infantry. He later served at Fort Benning in Georgia from 1937 to 1940, attending the Infantry School tank course and commanding the 2nd Battalion, 66th Infantry (Light Tanks). Weaver was promoted to lieutenant colonel in August 1935 and colonel in May 1940.

Weaver served as commander of the 68th Armored Regiment, 2nd Armored Division at Fort Benning from July 1940 to October 1941. He briefly served as acting commander of the division in June and October 1941 during the absence of the commanding general, George S. Patton. Weaver was sent to the Philippines in November 1941, where he organized and took command of the Provisional Tank Group. He received a temporary promotion to brigadier general in December 1941. Weaver was captured by Japanese forces on the Bataan peninsula in April 1942 and then remained a prisoner of war until liberated from Hoten Camp in Manchuria by Russian forces in August 1945.

After the war, Weaver served in California, commanding Fort Ord in 1946 and then Camp Beale until June 1947. He retired from active duty as a brigadier general on 31 May 1948.

Weaver died at his home in Menlo Park, California on August 29, 1967, and was buried at San Francisco National Cemetery.

== See also ==
- 149th Armor Regiment
- 192nd Tank Battalion
