= Jesse A. Ladd =

American general (1887-1957)

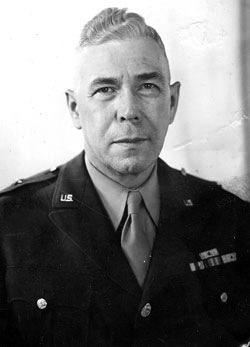
- Born: 21 September 1887; Bradner, Ohio, US
- Died: 14 December 1957 (aged 70); San Francisco, California, US
- Burial place: San Francisco National Cemetery
- Military career
- Allegiance: United States
- Branch: United States Army
- Service years: 1911–1947
- Rank: Brigadier General
- Commands: Normandy Base Section; 9th Infantry Division
- Conflicts: World War I: Pancho Villa Expedition; World War II: Aleutian Islands campaign

Jesse Amos Ladd (21 September 1887 – 14 December 1957) was a United States Army general who served in World War I and World War II.

A graduate of the United States Military Academy at West Point, New York, ranked 20th in the class of 1911, Ladd served in the Hawaii and with the Pancho Villa Expedition in Mexico. Between the wars he was an instructor in tactics at West Point and the Infantry School at Fort Benning. During World War II he commanded Fort Richardson and Fort Glenn in Alaska, and commanded the Normandy Base Section in the European Theater of Operations. He commanded 9th Infantry Division in the Occupation of Germany, and retired in 1947.

== Early life ==
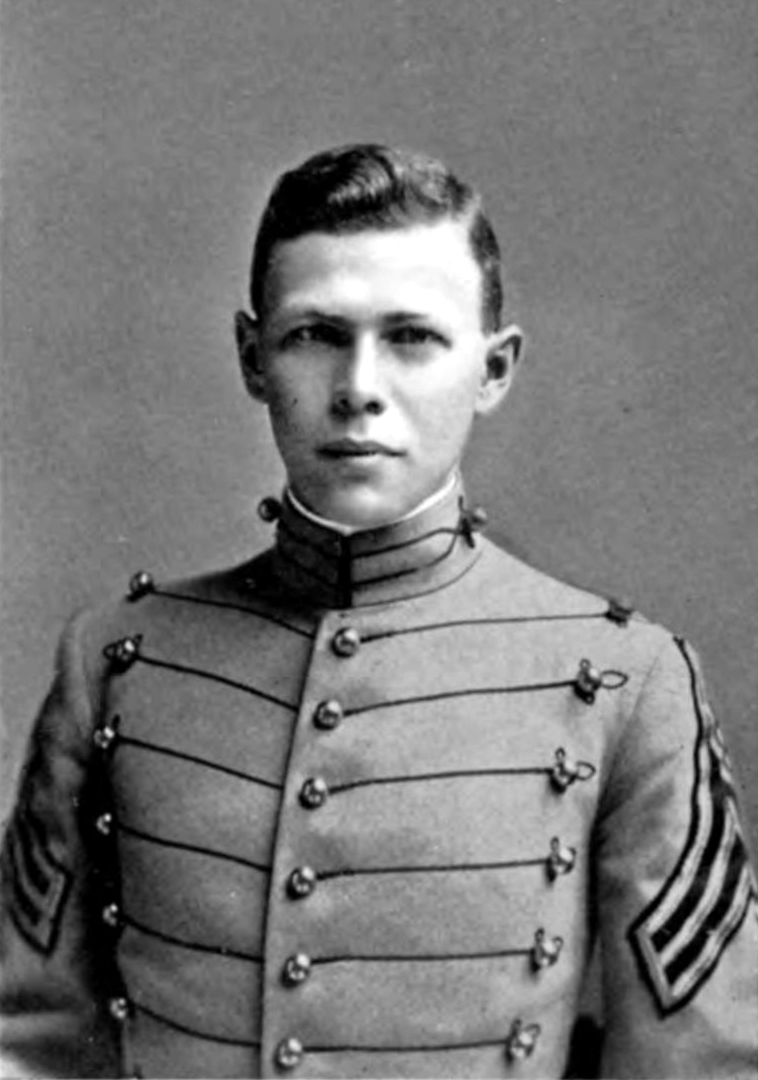
At West Point in 1911

Jesse Amos Ladd was born in Bradner, Ohio, on 21 September 1887, the oldest of a large family of seven boys and three girls. He attended Bradner High School, where he played halfback on the high school football team. He entered the United States Military Academy at West Point, New York, on 15 June 1907. During his plebe year he played football with the plebe team, but joined the varsity football team, which was coached by Second Lieutenant Joseph Stilwell, the following year. He graduated on 13 June 1911, ranked 48th in his class, and was commissioned as a second lieutenant in the 1st Infantry Regiment.

The 1st Infantry was based at Vancouver Barracks, Washington, until 10 May 1912, when it moved to the Schofield Barracks in the Territory of Hawaii. While he was stationed there, he made two trips back to the mainland: one was to attend a musketry course at Fort Benning, Georgia, and the other back to Ohio to marry Florence Estelle Von Kanel of Bowling Green, Ohio, on 21 October 1913. They had two sons: Jonathan Frederic Ladd, who was born in Bowling Green on 12 May 1921, and James Von Kanel Ladd, who was born there on 17 June 1923.

== World War I ==
Ladd returned to the mainland in September 1915, and was transferred to the 24th Infantry Regiment at the Presidio of San Francisco. In March 1916 it was deployed to the Mexican border, and he served with the Pancho Villa Expedition. He was promoted to first lieutenant on 1 July 1916, and captain in the newly formed 35th Infantry Regiment on 15 May 1917. In September 1917, he became an instructor at the Reserve Officers' Training Camp at Fort Oglethorpe, Georgia. He served at Camp Dodge, Iowa, from 11 September to 7 November 1918, and then in Washington, DC in the Office of Inspector General, before returning to Camp Dodge as Division Inspector with the 19th Division and then the 4th Division. He was involved in quelling unrest in Gary, Indiana, during the steel strike of 1919. Four of his brothers served as officers in the Army during the war, and one was killed in action.

== Between the wars ==
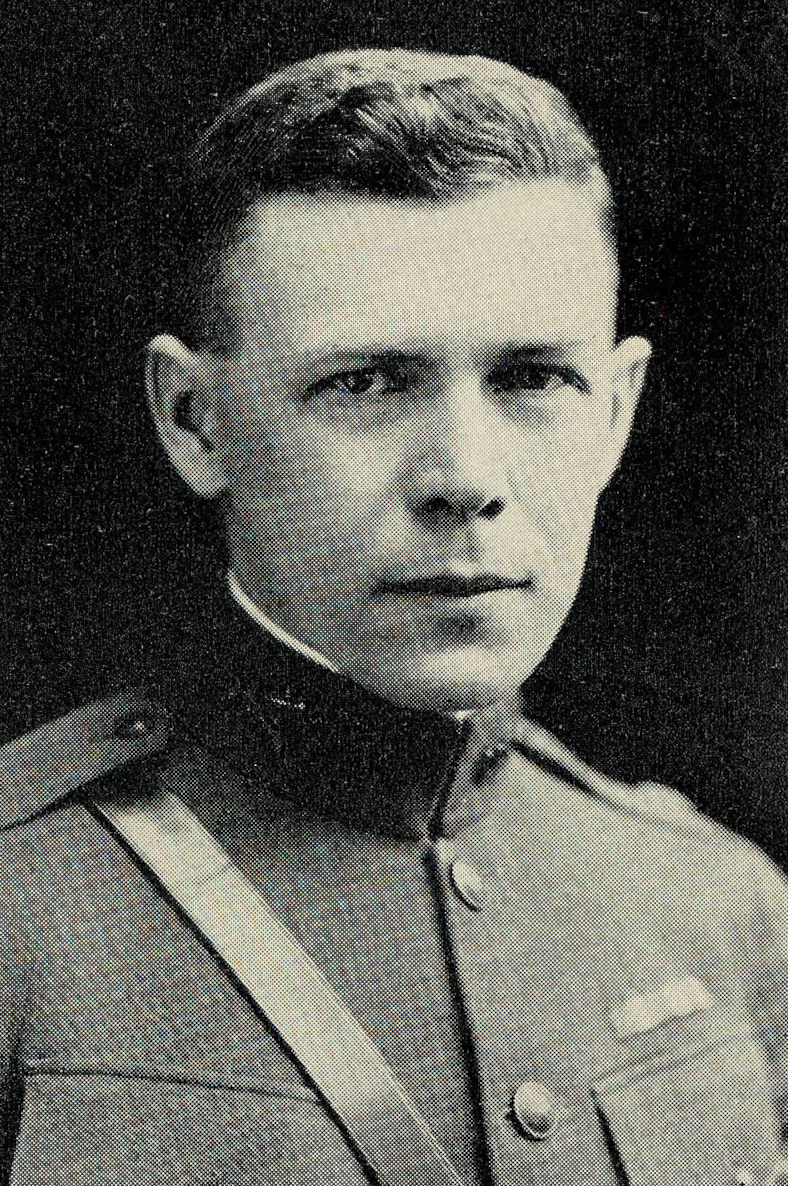
Ladd as a West Point Tactical Officer c. 1924

On 30 June 1920, Ladd reverted to his substantive rank of captain, but he was promoted to major again the next day. The 4th Division relocated to Camp Lewis, Washington, and on 2 September he transferred to the 21st Infantry Regiment at Fort Douglas, Utah. On 9 October 1920, he became a student at the Infantry School at Fort Benning, and he remained there after graduation on 30 June 1921 as an instructor. From 24 August 1922 to 5 July 1925 he was an instructor in tactics at West Point. He attended the Command and General Staff College at Fort Leavenworth, Kansas, from 19 August 1925 to 19 June 1926, where his classmates included Major Dwight D. Eisenhower. Ladd then returned to Fort Benning for a second tour of duty as an instructor. From 6 September 1930 to 12 June 1931 he attended the Tank School at Fort George G. Meade, Maryland. He was a member of the Tank Board there until 4 August, and then the Infantry Board at Fort Benning until 29 April 1935.

Ladd commanded the 3rd Battalion, 30th Infantry Regiment at the Presidio of San Francisco until 1 June 1935. He then served there on the staff of the Fourth United States Army, and was promoted to lieutenant colonel on 1 August 1935 after 17 years as a major. He was a student officer at the Army War College from 1 August 1937 to 25 June 1938, and commanded the 1st Battalion, 2nd Infantry Regiment at Fort Sheridan, Illinois, from 7 July 1938 to 26 October 1939, and the 15th Infantry Regiment at Fort Lewis, Washington, from 8 December 1939 to 11 August 1941, with the rank of colonel from 1 May 1940, with Eisenhower as his executive officer. Ladd was in command at the North American Aviation plant in Inglewood, California when Federal troops seized control of the plant during a strike in June 1941.

== World War II ==
With the prospect of war with Japan, the Territory of Alaska looked vulnerable. Ladd, who was promoted to brigadier general on 4 August 1941, assumed command of Fort Richardson, Alaska on 4 September 1941. He commanded the Allied troops at Fort Glenn, Alaska from 13 June to 15 September 1942, at Fort Richardson again until 20 January 1943, and at Fort Glenn again from 21 January to 3 December 1943. Ladd's next assignment was as commander of Camp Reynolds and the Army Service Forces Replacement Depot, from 17 December 1943 to 20 February 1945. Camp Reynolds was closed on 11 December 1944. Ladd then went to the European Theater of Operations, where he commanded the Western District of the Normandy Base Section from 27 February 1945 to 17 May 1945. Following the departure of Major General Henry S. Aurand, he also assumed command of the Normandy Base Section as well on 8 May 1945. He commanded the 9th Infantry Division in the Occupation of Germany from 22 May 1945 to 30 January 1946, but the war ended before it saw further action.

== Post-war ==
After the war, Ladd returned to Fort Benning, where he was a member of the Army Ground Forces Board. He was reduced to his substantive rank of colonel on 28 February 1946, and retired at his own request on 30 September 1947. He was promoted to brigadier general on the Retired List on 16 August 1948. Of the places that he had been stationed, Ladd liked the San Francisco area best, and Palo Alto, California. His older son Fred entered West Point in 1939, but flunked out in his first year. He graduated from the University of Washington in 1943 and enlisted in the Army. He received a Regular Army commission, and fought in the Korean War and commanded Special Forces in Cambodia during the Vietnam War, rising to the rank of colonel. Ladd's younger son Jim also went to West Point. He graduated 587th in the class of 1946. He too reached the rank of colonel, and was awarded the Distinguished Service Cross for gallantry in the Korean War. Ladd died from leukemia at Letterman Army Hospital in San Francisco on 14 December 1957, and was interred in San Francisco National Cemetery.

== Dates of rank ==
Insignia	Rank	Component	Date	Reference
No pin insignia in 1911	Second lieutenant	Infantry	13 June 1911	
	First lieutenant	Infantry	1 July 1916	
	Captain	Infantry	15 May 1917	
	Major	National Army	7 June 1918	
	Captain	Infantry	30 June 1920	
	Major	Infantry	1 July 1920	
	Lieutenant colonel	Infantry	1 August 1935	
	Colonel	Infantry	1 May 1940	
	Brigadier general	Army of the United States	4 August 1941	
	Colonel	Infantry	28 February 1946	
	Colonel	Retired List	30 September 1947	
	Brigadier general	Retired List	16 August 1948	

== Notes ==
Military offices
Preceded by Louis A. Craig	Commanding General 9th Infantry Division; 1945−1946	Succeeded by Horace L. McBride
