= Operation Avalanche =

1943 Allied landings in Italy

- Part of the Invasion of Italy
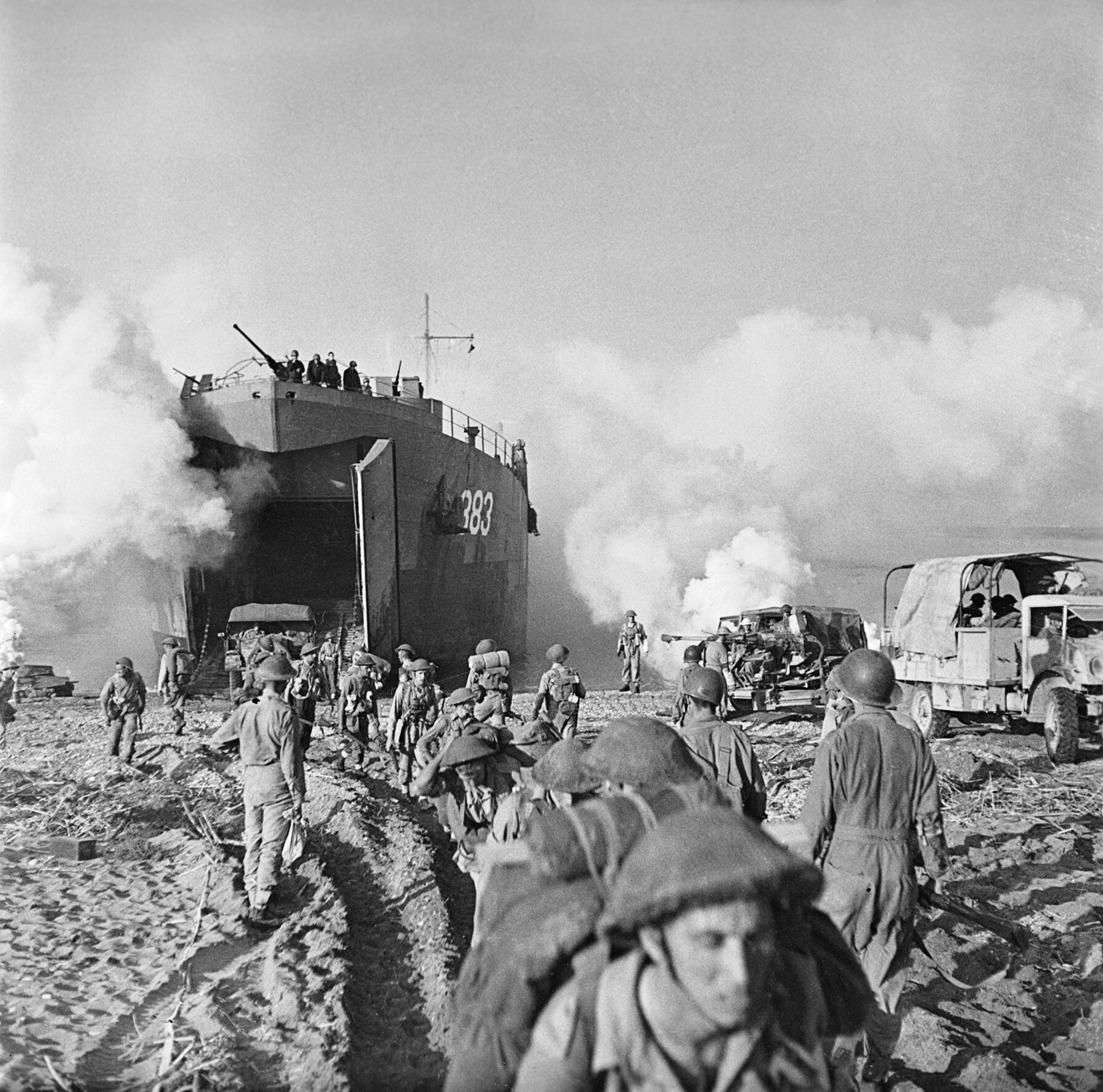
- British infantry landing on Salerno, September 1943.
Date	9–17 September 1943
Location	Salerno, Italy
Result	Allied victory

Belligerents
United Kingdom; United States	Germany

Commanders and leaders
Mark W. Clark	Heinrich von Vietinghoff; Traugott Herr; Rudolf Sieckenius

Strength
170,000 servicemen	35,000 Germans

Casualties and losses
United Kingdom; 982 killed 4,060 wounded 2,230 missing Royal Navy: 83 killed 42 wounded United States; 5th Army: 788 killed 2,841 wounded 1,318 missing US Navy: 296 killed 422 wounded 551 missing Total: 2,149 killed 7,365 wounded 4,099 missing	(Nazi Germany) Germany; 840 killed 2,002 wounded 603 missing

Operation Avalanche was the codename for the Allied landings near the port of Salerno, executed on 9 September 1943, part of the Allied invasion of Italy during World War II. The Italians withdrew from the war the day before the invasion, but the Allies landed in an area defended by German troops. Planned under the name Top Hat, it was supported by the deception plan Operation Boardman.

The landings were carried out by the U.S. Fifth Army, under Lieutenant General Mark W. Clark. It comprised the U.S. VI Corps, the British X Corps, and the U.S. 82nd Airborne Division, a total of about nine divisions. Its primary objectives were to seize the port of Naples to ensure resupply, and to cut across to the east coast, trapping the Axis troops further south.

In order to draw troops away from the landing ground, Operation Baytown was mounted. This was a landing by the British Eighth Army, under General Sir Bernard Montgomery, in Calabria in the 'toe' of Italy, on 3 September. Simultaneous sea landings were made by the British 1st Airborne Division at the port of Taranto (Operation Slapstick). The Salerno landings were carried out without previous naval or aerial bombardment in order to achieve surprise. Surprise was not achieved.

The Germans had established artillery and machine-gun posts and scattered tanks through the landing zones which made progress difficult, but the beach areas were captured. Around 07:00 a concerted counterattack was made by the 16th Panzer Division. It caused heavy casualties but was beaten off. Both the British and the Americans made slow progress, and still had a 10 miles (16 km) gap between them at the end of day one. They linked up by the end of day two and occupied 35–45 miles (56–72 km) of coastline to a depth of 6–7 miles (9.7–11.3 km).

Over 12–14 September the Germans organized a concerted counterattack by six divisions of motorized troops, hoping to throw the Salerno beachhead into the sea before it could link with the British Eighth Army. Heavy casualties were inflicted, as the Allied troops were too thinly spread to be able to resist concentrated attacks. The outermost troops were therefore withdrawn in order to reduce the perimeter. The new perimeter was held with the assistance of naval and aerial support, although the German attacks reached almost to the beaches in places.

== Background ==
Following the defeat of the Italian Forces and Afrika Korps in North Africa, there was disagreement between the Allies as to what the next step should be. Winston Churchill, the British Prime Minister, in particular wanted to invade Italy, which he called the "underbelly of Europe" (commonly misquoted as "soft underbelly"). Popular support in Italy for the war was declining, and he believed an invasion would remove Italy, and thus the influence of the Italian Navy (Regia Marina) in the Mediterranean Sea, opening it to Allied traffic. This would make it much easier to supply Allied forces in the Middle East and Far East, and increase British and American supplies to the Soviet Union. In addition, it would tie down German forces, keeping them away from the planned Allied invasion of Normandy – codenamed Operation Overlord.

However, General George C. Marshall, the Chief of Staff of the United States Army, and much of the American staff wanted to undertake no operations that might delay the Normandy invasion. When it became clear that Operation Overlord could not be undertaken in 1943, it was agreed forces in North Africa should be used to invade Sicily, with no commitment made to any follow-up operations.

Joint Allied Forces Headquarters (AFHQ) were operationally responsible for all Allied land forces in the Mediterranean theatre and it was they who planned and commanded the invasion of Sicily and the Italian mainland.

The Allied invasion of Sicily in July 1943, codenamed Operation Husky, was highly successful, although many of the Axis forces there were allowed to avoid capture and escape to the mainland. More importantly a coup deposed Benito Mussolini as head of the Italian government, which then began approaching the Allies to make peace. It was believed a quick invasion of Italy might hasten an Italian surrender and produce quick military victories over the German troops that would now be trapped fighting in a hostile country. However, Italian (and more so German) resistance proved relatively strong, and fighting in Italy continued even after the fall of Berlin. In addition, the invasion left the Allies in a position of supplying food and supplies to conquered territory, a burden that would otherwise have fallen on Germany. As well, Italy occupied by a hostile German army would have created additional problems for the German Commander-in-Chief Albrecht von Kesselring.

=== The plan ===
A diversion operation was designed to support the landings at Salerno, named Operation Boardman. The operation began on June 30, 1943, and ended on August 31, 1943. The plan for the operation was for the Abwehr to intercept radio transmissions which contained false plans for invasions of Sardinia, Corsica, Apulia, Southern France or Northwestern Italy, and finally Greece in that order. Essentially, the plan sought to weaken German and Italian forces in Southern and Central Italy by shifting Axis focus away from those regions. Also part of this operation was the use of dummies previously used in Operation Waterfall. The dummies were refurbished and set up in Cyrenaica in a way that would suggest an invasion of the Peloponnese.

The main landings were scheduled after the success at Sicily for September 9. The main force would land around Salerno on the western coast in Operation Avalanche. It would consist of the U.S. Fifth Army under Lieutenant General Mark W. Clark, comprising the U.S. VI Corps under Major General Ernest J. Dawley, the X British Corps under Lieutenant-General Richard McCreery, and the U.S. 82nd Airborne Division in reserve, a total of about nine divisions. Its primary objectives were to seize the port of Naples to ensure resupply, and to cut across to the east coast, trapping Axis troops further south. The inclusion of the 82nd Airborne Division as a reserve force was possible only with the cancellation of Operation Giant II. The 1st British Airborne Division would be landed by sea near Taranto, on the "heel" of Italy in Operation Slapstick, as a diversion for Salerno. Their task was to capture the port and several nearby airfields and link with the Eighth Army before pressing north to join the Fifth Army near Foggia.

The plan was deeply flawed. The Fifth Army would be landing on a very broad 35-mile front, using only three assault divisions, and the two corps were widely separated both in distance and by a river. Furthermore, the terrain was highly favorable to the defender. A U.S. Army Ranger force under Colonel William Orlando Darby consisting of three Ranger battalions and two British Commando units was tasked with holding the mountain passes leading to Naples, but no plan existed for linking the Ranger force with X Corps' follow-up units. Finally, Clark ordered that no naval preparatory bombardment take place, concerned that surprise would be lost and reinforcements summoned if a bombardment was made.

Approximately eight German divisions were positioned to cover possible landing sites, including the Hermann Goering Division, 26th and 16th Panzer, the 15th and 29th Panzergrenadier, and the 1st and 2nd Fallschirmjäger.

== Order of battle ==
=== Allied ===
Naval and ground force commanders for Operation Avalanche

Vice Adm. H. Kent Hewitt, USN

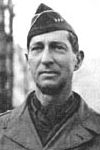
Lt. Gen. Mark W. Clark, USA

Clark's corps commanders

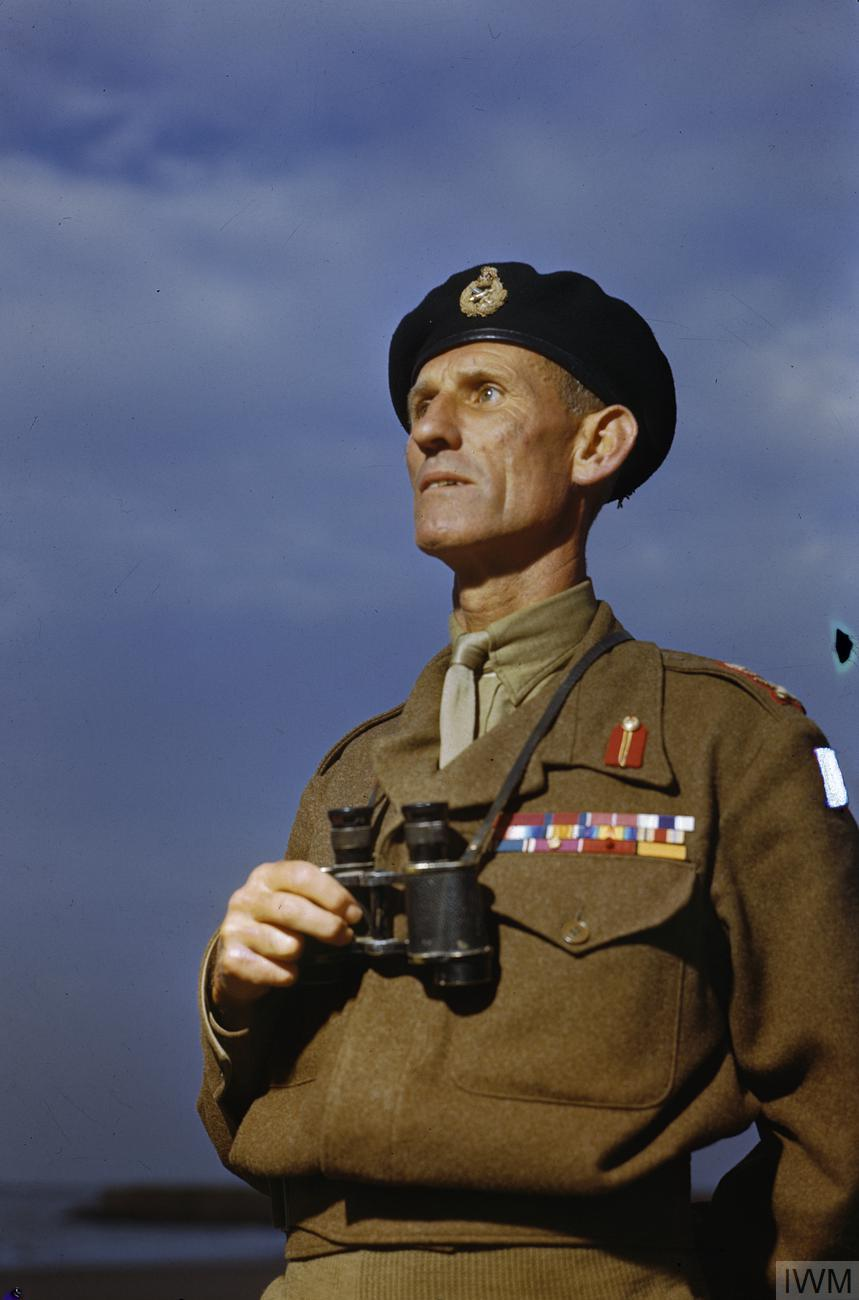
Lt. Gen. Richard L. McCreery, BA

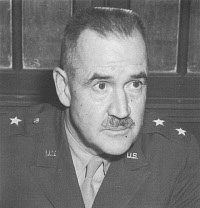
Maj. Gen. Ernest J. Dawley, USA

Allied Landing Forces

Embarked in Task Force 80: Western Naval Task Force

Vice Admiral H. Kent Hewitt, USN

US Fifth Army (Lieutenant General Mark Wayne Clark, USA)

British X Corps (Lt. Gen. Richard L. McCreery, BA)
US VI Corps (Maj. Gen. Ernest J. Dawley, USA)

Northern Landing Area (South of Salerno)

Embarked in Task Force 85: Northern Landing Force

Commodore G.N. Oliver, RN

British X Corps (Lieutenant General Richard McCreery, BA)

- 46th Infantry Division (Maj.-Gen. John Hawkesworth)
- 56th (London) Infantry Division (Maj.-Gen. Douglas Graham)
- 7th Armoured Division (Maj.-Gen. George Erskine)
- 3 US Ranger Battalions (Lt. Col. William O. Darby, USA)
- 2 Commando Forces (Brig. Robert Laycock)

Southern Landing Area (Paestum)

Embarked in Task Force 81: Southern Landing Force

Rear Admiral John L. Hall Jr., USN

US VI Corps (Major General Ernest J. Dawley, USA)

- 36th Infantry Division (Maj. Gen. Fred L. Walker, USA)
- 45th Infantry Division (Maj. Gen. Troy H. Middleton, USA)

=== Axis ===
Army group and army commanders

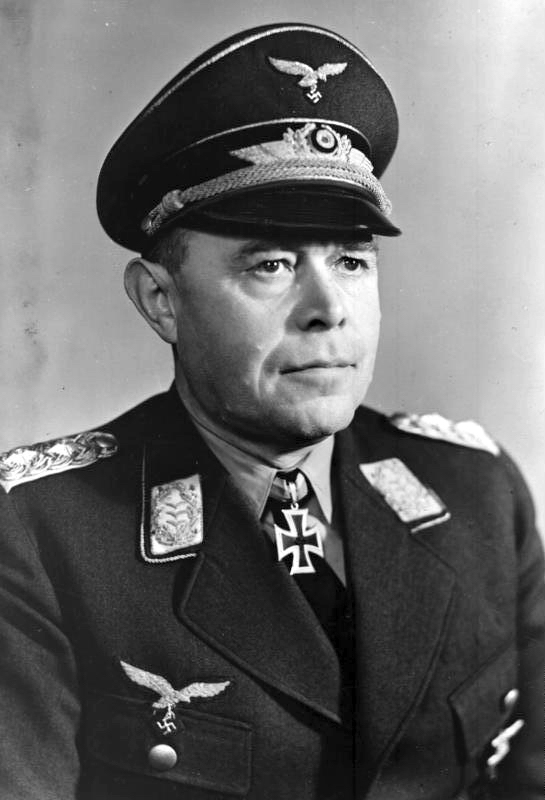
Fld. Mrshl. Albert Kesselring

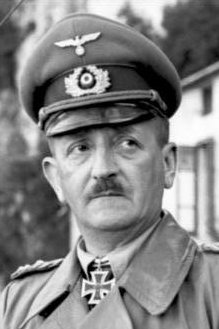
GdPT Heinrich von Vietinghoff

Army Group C
Generalfeldmarschall Albert Kesselring

Tenth Army
General Heinrich von Vietinghoff

XIV Panzer Corps
General der Panzertruppen Hermann Balck

Deployed along coast from north to south of Naples:

- 15th Panzergrenadier Division (Generalleutnant Eberhard Rodt)
- Panzer Division Hermann Göring (Generalmajor Wilhelm Schmalz)
- 16th Panzer Division (Generalleutnant Rudolf Sieckenius) (Note: Absorbed the initial Allied assault)

LXXVI Panzer Corps
General der Panzertruppen Traugott Herr

Deployed in Calabria and Apulia:

- 26th Panzer Division (Generalleutnant Smilo Freiherr von Lüttwitz)
- 3rd Panzergrenadier Division (Generalleutnant Fritz-Hubert Gräser)
- 29th Panzergrenadier Division (Generalleutnant Walter Fries)

== Landings ==
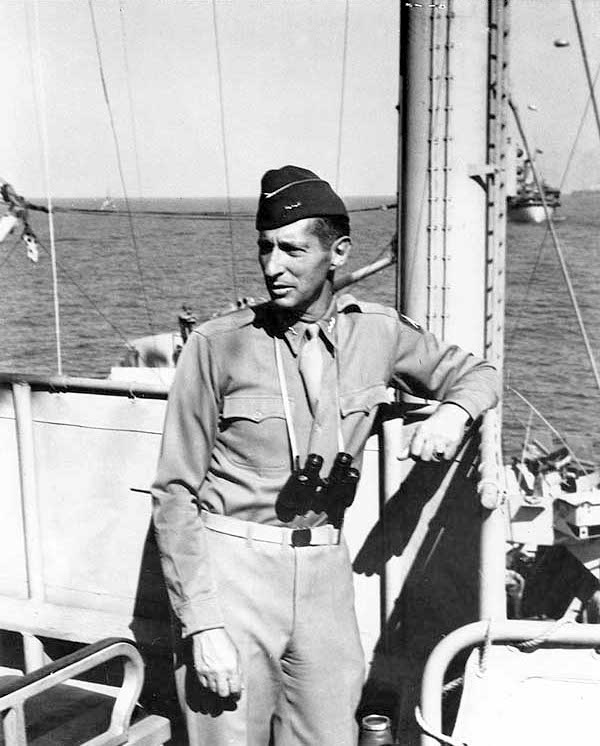
US General Mark Wayne Clark on board USS Ancon during the landings at Salerno, Italy, 12 September 1943.

At Salerno the decision had been taken to assault without previous naval or aerial bombardment, in order to secure surprise. Tactical surprise was not achieved, as the naval commanders had predicted. As the first wave approached the shore at Paestum a loudspeaker from the landing area proclaimed in English, "Come on in and give up. We have you covered." The troops attacked nonetheless.

The Germans had established artillery and machine-gun posts and scattered tanks through the landing zones which made progress difficult, but the beach areas were successfully taken. Around 07:00 a concerted counterattack was made by the 16th Panzer division. It caused heavy casualties, but was beaten off with naval gunfire support. Both the British and the Americans made slow progress, and still had a 10-mile gap between them at the end of day one. They linked up by the end of day two and occupied 35–45 miles of coast line to a depth of six or seven miles.

General Montgomery had predicted Baytown would be a waste of effort because it assumed the Germans would give battle in Calabria; if they failed to do so, the diversion would not work. He was proved correct. After Baytown, the Eighth Army marched 300 miles (480 km) north to the Salerno area against no opposition other than engineer obstacles.

During September 12–14 the Germans organized a concerted counterattack with six divisions of motorised troops, hoping to throw the Salerno beachhead into the sea before it could link with the British 8th Army. Heavy casualties were inflicted, as the Allied troops were too thinly spread to be able to resist concentrated attacks. The outermost troops were therefore withdrawn in order to reduce the perimeter. The new perimeter was held with the assistance of 4,000 paratroopers from the 82nd and 509th PIB who air dropped near the hot spots, from strong naval gunfire support, and from well-served Fifth Army artillery. The German attacks reached almost to the beaches but ultimately failed. The heavy gunfire of Allied battleships practically immobilised counterattacking German units with their sheer firepower, forcing the Germans to halt their counteroffensive and regroup.

General Clark was awarded the Distinguished Service Cross, the second-highest US award for valor in combat, for his front-line leadership during this crisis. He was frequently seen in the most forward positions encouraging the troops. However, in the estimate of historian Carlo D'Este, both Clark and Harold Alexander bore responsibility for the Salerno landings being a near-disaster.

=== Salerno mutiny ===
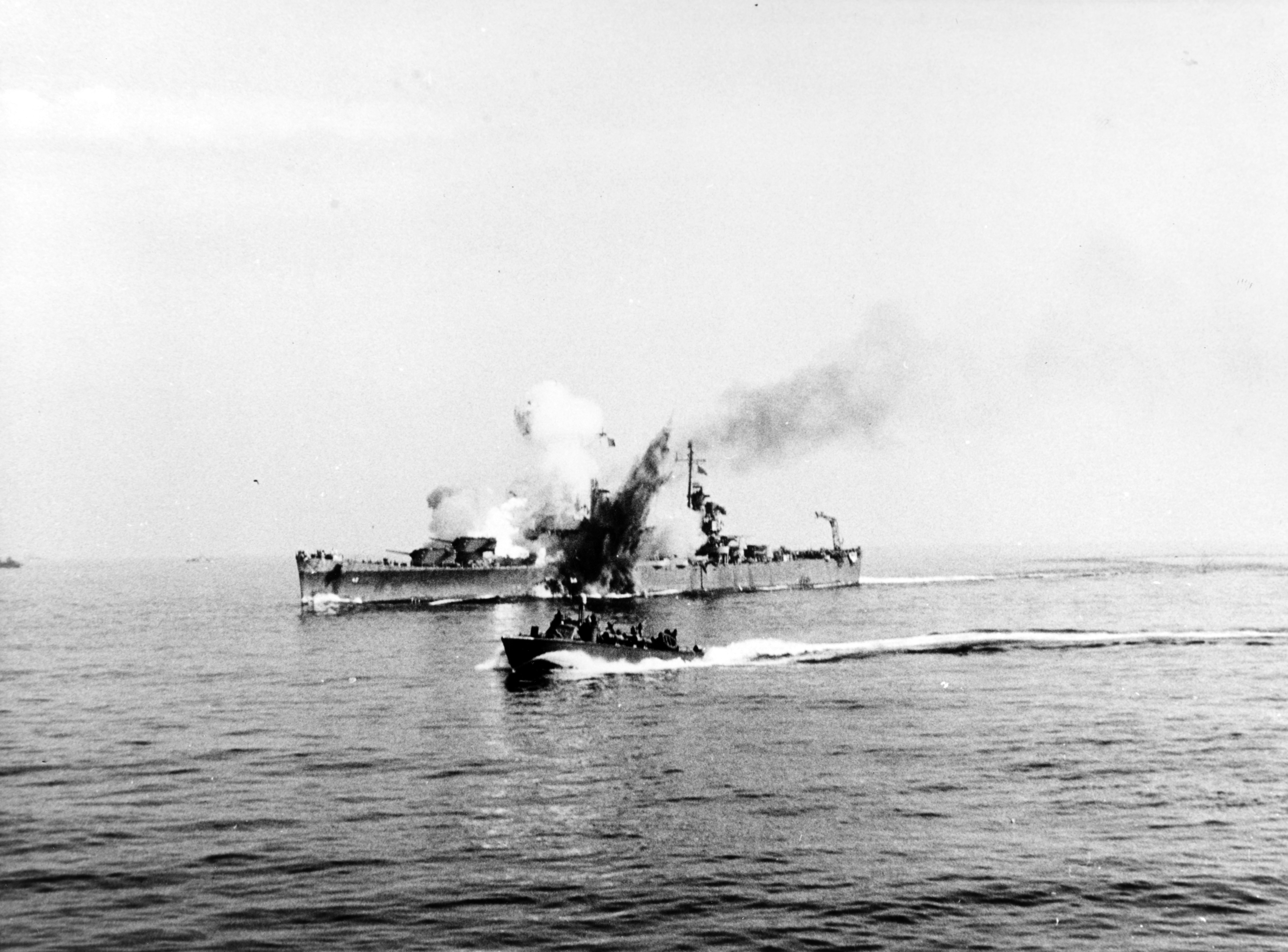
USS Savannah being struck by a German guided bomb off Salerno, 197 crewmen died in the attack and another 15 were injured

The Salerno battle was also the site of a mutiny by about 600 men of the British 10th Corps, who on September 16 refused assignment to new units as replacements. They had previously understood that they would be returning to their own units from which they had been separated during the fighting in the North African Campaign, mainly because they had been wounded. Eventually the Corps commander, Lieutenant-General Richard McCreery, persuaded most of the men to follow their orders. The NCOs who led the mutiny were sentenced to death, but were eventually allowed to rejoin units and the sentence was not carried out.

=== German strategy changes ===
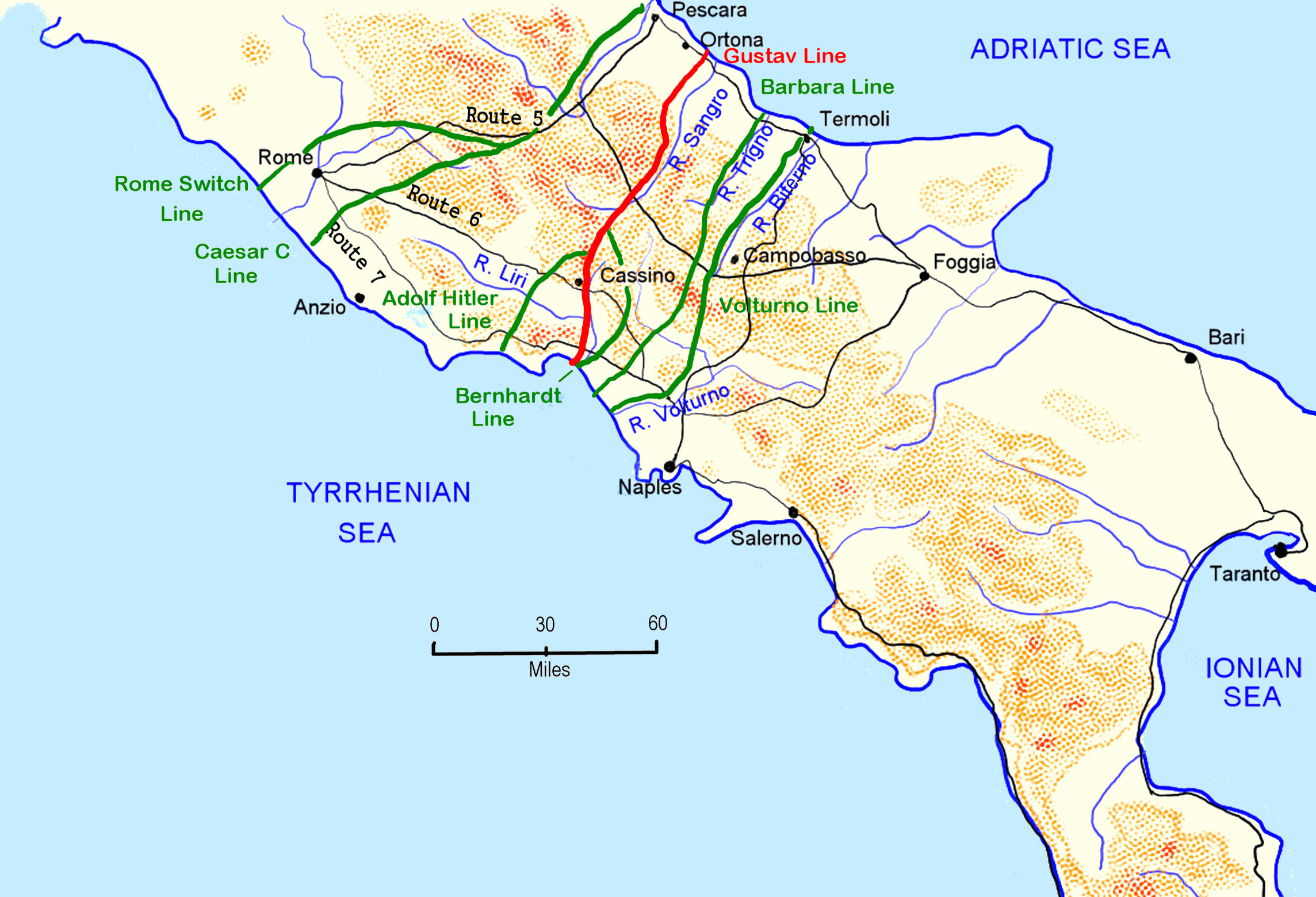
Map of the German prepared defensive lines south of Rome.

The German 10th Army had come very close to overwhelming the Salerno beachhead. The Allies had been fortunate that at this time Adolf Hitler had sided with the view of his Army Group commander in Northern Italy, Field Marshal Erwin Rommel, and decided that defending Italy south of Rome was not a strategic priority. As a result, the Army Group Commander in southern Italy, Field Marshal Albert Kesselring had been forbidden to call upon reserves from the northern Army Group. The subsequent success of the German 10th Army's defensive campaign in inflicting very heavy casualties on both U.S. 5th and British 8th Armies and Kesselring's strategic arguments that the Allies should be kept as far away from Germany as possible led Hitler to change his mind in October at which point he withdrew Rommel to oversee the build-up of defenses in northern France and gave Kesselring command of the whole of Italy with a remit to keep Rome in German hands for the longest time possible.

== Aftermath ==
=== Casualties ===
General Clark in his book Calculated Risk reports that the X Corps suffered 531 killed in action, 1,915 wounded and 1,561 missing, while the VI Corps had 225 killed, 853 wounded and 589 missing. Clark also stated that most of the missing from both corps subsequently returned to the front lines. After a week long battle, the combined Allied losses were heavy, with 2,349 killed, 7,366 wounded and 4,100 missing.

German losses numbered 840 killed, 2,002 wounded and 603 missing.Most of these losses were inflicted by Allied naval support fire and field guns.

=== Further Allied advances ===
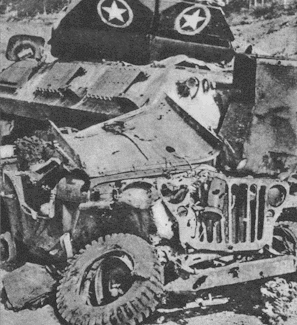
US Jeep and an M10 Tank Destroyer destroyed in Salerno.

With the Salerno beachhead secure, the 5th Army could begin to attack northwest towards Naples. The 8th Army had been making quick progress from the "toe" in the face of German engineer delaying actions and linked with the 1st Airborne Division on the Adriatic coast. It united the left of its front with the 5th Army's right on 16 September, and advancing up the Adriatic coast captured the airfields near Foggia on 27 September. Foggia was a major Allied objective because the large airfield complex there would give the Allied air forces the ability to strike new targets in France, Germany and the Balkans. The 5th Army captured Naples on 1 October, and reached the line of the Volturno River on October 6. This provided a natural barrier, securing Naples, the Campanian Plain and the vital airfields on it from counterattack. Meanwhile, on the Adriatic coast, the British 8th Army had advanced to a line from Campobasso to Larino and Termoli on the Biferno river.

Thus, by early October, the whole of southern Italy was in Allied hands, and the Allied armies now stood facing the Volturno Line, the first of a series of prepared defensive lines running across Italy from which the Germans chose to fight delaying actions, giving ground slowly and buying time to complete their preparation of the Winter Line, their strongest defensive line south of Rome. The next stage of the Italian Campaign became for the Allied armies a grinding and attritional slog against skillful, determined and well prepared defenses in terrain and weather conditions which favoured defense and hampered the Allied advantages in mechanised equipment and air superiority. It took until mid-January 1944 to fight through the Volturno, Barbara and Bernhardt lines to reach the Gustav Line, the backbone of the Winter Line defenses, setting the scene for the four Battles of Monte Cassino which took place between January and May 1944.

== Bibliography ==
=== Print ===
- D'Este, Carlo (1991). Fatal Decision: Anzio and the Battle for Rome. HarperPerennial. ISBN 0-06-092148-X.
- Grigg, John (1985). 1943: The Victory that Never Was. Kensington Publishing Corporation. ISBN 0-8217-1596-8.
- Holland, James (2023). The Savage Storm: the Battle for Italy 1943 (Paperback). London: Transworld. ISBN 9781787636682.
- Konstam, Angus (2007). Salerno 1943: The Allied Invasion of Italy. Pen and Sword Books. ISBN 978-1-84415-517-0. – Total pages: 192
- Konstam, Angus (2013). Salerno 1943: The Allies invade southern Italy. Osprey Publishing. ISBN 978-1-78096-249-8. – Total pages: 96
- Morison, Samuel Eliot (1954). Sicily – Salerno – Anzio, January 1943–June 1944. History of United States Naval Operations in World War II. Vol. IX. Boston: Little, Brown and Co. ISBN 0-7858-1310-1.
- Morris, Eric (1993). La guerra inutile. La campagna d'Italia 1943–45. Milan: Longanesi. ISBN 978-88-304-1154-8.
- Muhm, Gerhard (1993). "La Tattica tedesca nella Campagna d'Italia". In Montemaggi, Amedeo (ed.). Linea Gotica avanposto dei Balcani (in Italian) (Civitas ed.). Roma.
- Hickey, Des; Smith, Gus (1984). Operation Avalanche: the Salerno landings, 1943. McGraw-Hill. ISBN 0-07-028682-5.
- Salerno Remembered by Geoffrey Curtis. Published by The Queen's Royal Surrey Regimental Association 1988 ISBN 978-0-7110-1901-0
- David, Saul (2005). Mutiny at Salerno: An Injustice Exposed. London: Conway Maritime Press. pp. 240 pages. ISBN 978-1-84486-019-7.

== Filmography ==
- A Walk in the Sun (1945 film), directed by Lewis Milestone, US
