= John P. Lucas =

US Army general (1890–1949)

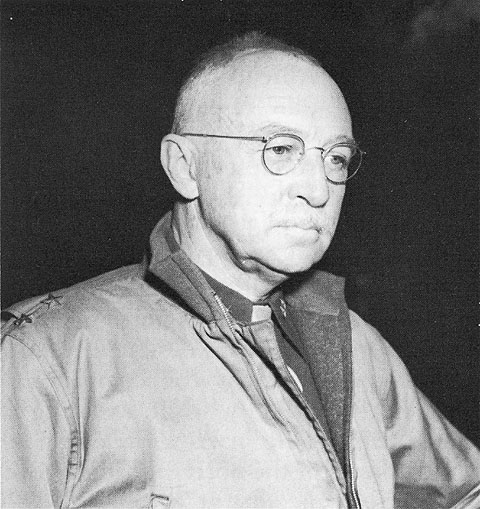
- Born: January 14, 1890; Kearneysville, West Virginia, United States
- Died: December 24, 1949 (aged 59); Naval Station Great Lakes, Illinois, United States
- Burial place: Arlington National Cemetery
- Relatives: Sydney Virginia Wynkoop Lucas (wife); John Porter Lucas, Jr. (son)
- Military career
- Allegiance: United States
- Branch: United States Army
- Service years: 1911–1949
- Rank: Major General
- Nicknames: "Johnny" "Old Luke" "Foxy Grandpa"
- Service number: 0-3101
- Units: Cavalry Branch; Field Artillery Branch
- Commands: Fourth United States Army; Fifteenth United States Army; VI Corps; II Corps; III Corps; 3rd Infantry Division; 1st Field Artillery Regiment; 2nd Battalion, 4th Field Artillery Regiment; 1st Battalion, 82nd Field Artillery Regiment; 108th Field Signal Battalion
- Conflicts: Philippine–American War; Mexican Expedition; World War I World War II: Italian Campaign
- Awards: Army Distinguished Service Medal (2); Navy Distinguished Service Medal; Silver Star; Purple Heart

Major General John Porter Lucas (January 14, 1890 – December 24, 1949) was a senior officer of the United States Army who saw service in World War I and World War II. He is most remembered for being the commander of VI Corps during the Battle of Anzio (codenamed Operation Shingle) in early 1944 during the Italian campaign of World War II.

== Early life and education ==
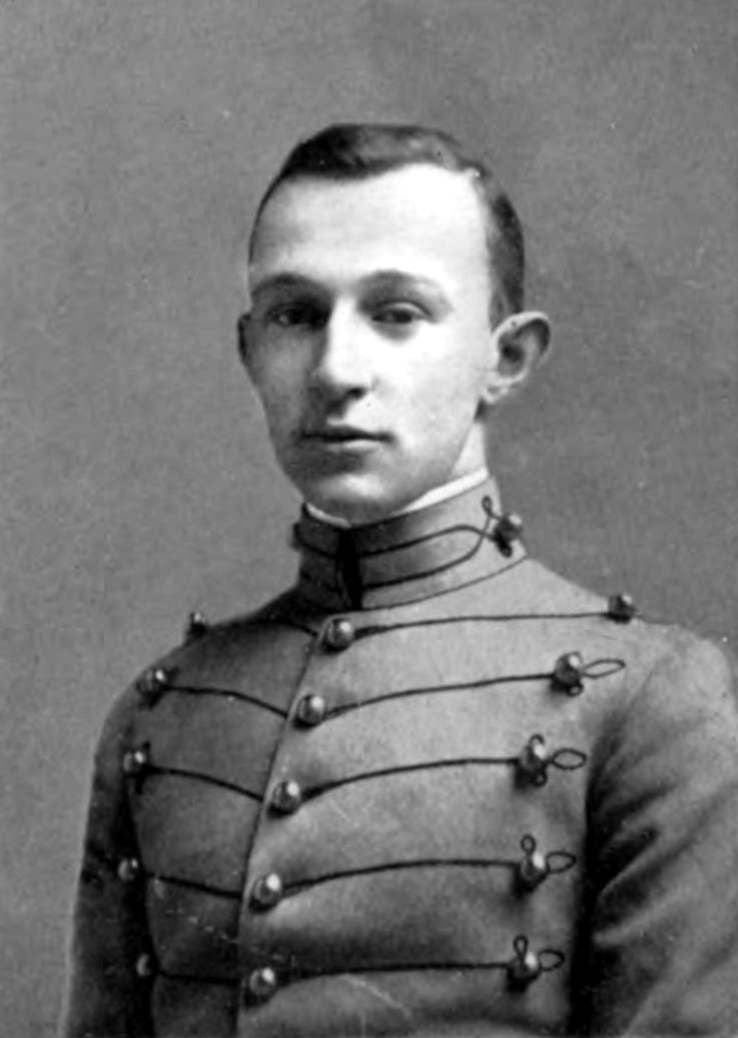
At West Point in 1911

John Porter Lucas was born on January 14, 1890, to the former Frances Thomas Craighill and her husband, Dr. Charles C. Lewis, in Kearneysville, Jefferson County, West Virginia. Generations of his ancestors had been prominent in Jefferson County. After education in the local schools, he attended the United States Military Academy (USMA) at West Point, New York, from where he graduated 55th in a class of 82 cadets with the class of 1911. His fellow graduates included numerous men who would later rise to the rank of brigadier general or higher in their military careers, such as Philip B. Fleming, Joseph C. Mehaffey, Raymond A. Wheeler, Harry R. Kutz, Thompson Lawrence, Gustave H. Franke, Bethel W. Simpson, Harold F. Nichols, Charles P. Hall, Alexander D. Surles, Karl S. Bradford, Herbert Dargue, Frederick Gilbreath, James B. Crawford, Jesse A. Ladd, Paul W. Baade, James R. N. Weaver, William H. H. Morris Jr., Ira T. Wyche and John L. Homer.

== Early military career ==
Commissioned as a cavalry officer on June 13, 1911, Lucas transferred to the Field Artillery in 1920. Lucas spent the first few years of his service in the Philippines, returning to the US in August 1914. Lucas was assigned to Troop A of the 13th Cavalry Regiment at Columbus, New Mexico in October 1914, but that unit was temporarily based at Douglas, Arizona, and in January 1915 he became commander of the regiment's Machine Gun Troop. On March 9, 1916, Lucas distinguished himself in action against Pancho Villa's raiders during the Battle of Columbus, fighting his way alone and bare-footed through attacking Villistas from his quarters to the camp's guard tent. There he organized resistance with a single machine gun until the remainder of his unit and a supporting troop arrived, then maneuvered his men to repel the attackers. He served during the Mexican Punitive Expedition, as an Aide de Camp to Major General George Bell Jr. at Fort Bliss, Texas.

== World War I ==
Lucas joined the 33rd Infantry Division in August 1917 at Camp Logan, Texas, where he continued to serve Bell, commander of the 33rd, as Aide de Camp. Lucas then led the division's Infantry School of Arms while the division trained for war. Promoted to major on January 15, 1918, he was given command of the 108th Field Signal Battalion (the Signal Battalion for the 33rd Infantry Division) and sailed to France with this unit. He simultaneously served as the Division Signal Officer. While serving as commander of the 108th, he was seriously wounded in action near Amiens, France, on June 23, 1918. Lucas was the battalion's first casualty, being struck by a fragment from a German high-explosive shell. Evacuated to a hospital in England, he was later sent back to the United States on convalescent leave, where he recovered from his wounds in the Washington, D.C., area. His wounds were severe enough to prevent him from rejoining the 33rd Infantry Division. He was promoted to lieutenant colonel on October 31, 1918. Following the war, he would revert to his permanent rank of captain.

== Inter-war period ==
From 1919 to 1920, and after returning to the United States, Lucas was assigned as a military science instructor for the University of Michigan R.O.T.C. program in Ann Arbor, Michigan. In 1920, he rejoined the field artillery. He was promoted to major in 1920, and in that year also entered the Field Artillery School at Fort Sill, Oklahoma (1920–1921). He graduated from the Field Artillery Advanced Course in 1921 and became an instructor at the Field Artillery School (1921–1923). He then entered the one-year program at the United States Army Command and General Staff College, Fort Leavenworth, Kansas, graduating in 1924 and finishing 78th out of 247 in his class. He next became the Professor of Military Science and Tactics for the R.O.T.C. program at Colorado Agricultural College (now Colorado State University), Fort Collins, Colorado. He served in this position for approximately 5 years (1924–1929), earning a Master of Science degree in 1927.

He was selected for command of 1st Battalion, 82d Field Artillery Regiment at Fort Bliss, Texas, from 1929 to 1930/31. He then enrolled in the Army War College, Carlisle, Pennsylvania, in June 1931, and graduated in June 1932. From 1932 to 1936, Lucas worked in the Personnel Division, G1, of the War Department General Staff. While he was there he was promoted to lieutenant colonel. He was promoted again, now to colonel on May 2, 1940, and from July to October, he served as commander of the 1st Field Artillery Regiment, Fort Sill, Oklahoma. After being promoted to the temporary rank of brigadier general on October 1, he then served as commander of the Artillery Brigade of the 2nd Infantry Division at Fort Sam Houston, Texas, until July 1941, when he was notified that he would be given command of the 3rd Infantry Division.

== World War II ==
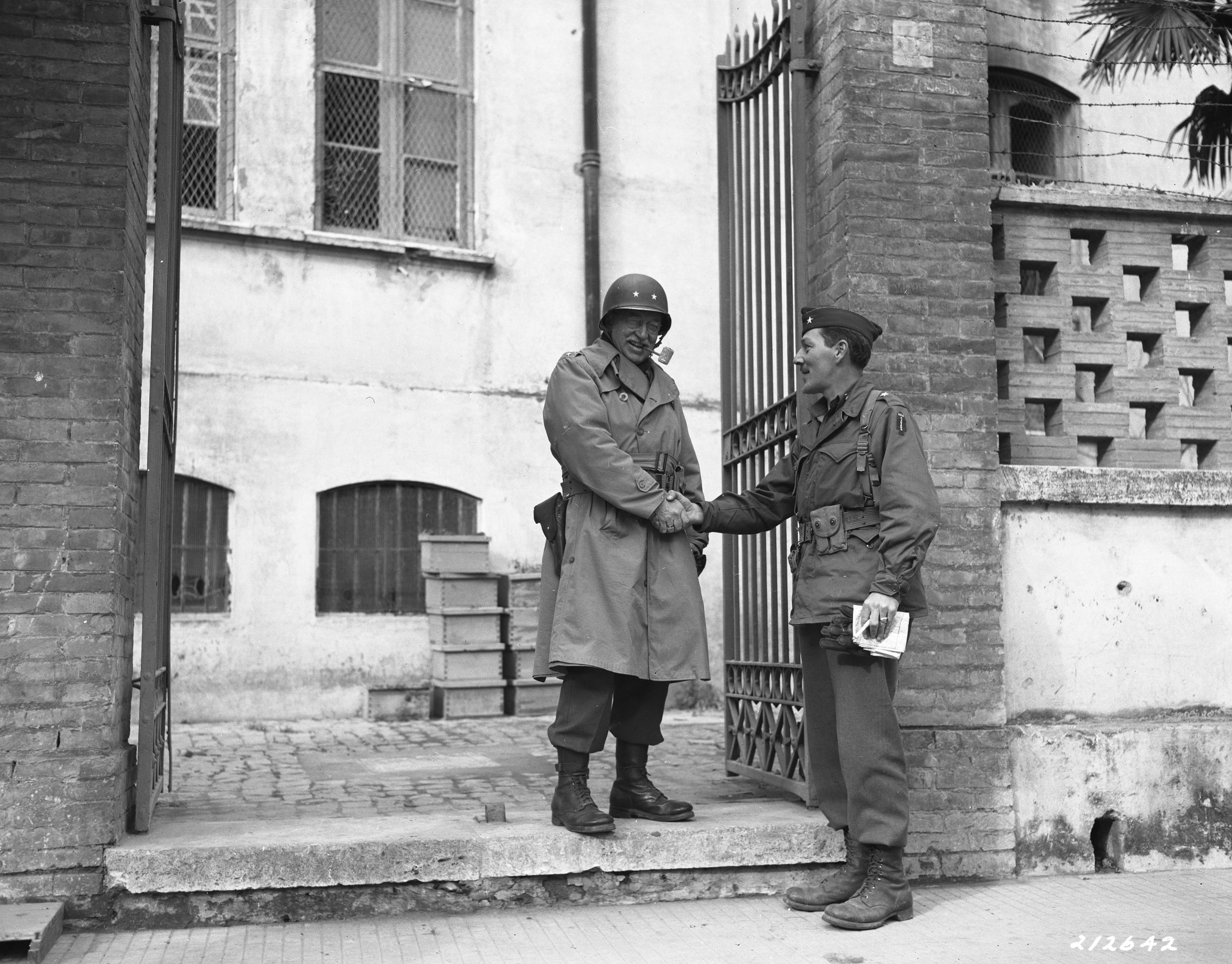
Lucas (left), CG, VI Corps, shakes hands with Brig. Gen. Robert T. Frederick, CG, 1st Special Service Force, at VI Corps Hq., in the Nettun area, Italy on 2 February 1944.

In September 1941, shortly after his promotion to temporary major general on August 5, Lucas was assigned as the commanding general (CG) of the 3rd Infantry Division at Fort Lewis, Washington, where he conducted amphibious operations training in Puget Sound. He was only in this assignment for six months, however, during which time the United States officially entered World War II in December 1941.

He was next assigned as the CG of the III Corps, in Fort McPherson, Georgia. In the spring of 1943 he was sent overseas to the Mediterranean Theater of Operations (MTO) as a deputy to General Dwight David "Ike" Eisenhower, the Supreme Allied Commander in the theater. There, in the aftermath of the disastrous airborne drops in Operation Husky, he recommended to General Eisenhower that "the organization of Airborne Troops into [units as large as] divisions is unsound". He briefly took command of II Corps in September, taking over from Lieutenant General Omar Bradley.

On September 20, 1943, Lucas was given command of VI Corps, taking over from Major General Ernest J. Dawley. He led the corps in the early stages of the Italian Campaign, coming under command of the Fifth United States Army, commanded by Lieutenant General Mark Clark, who was many years younger. VI Corps crossed the Volturno Line in October and was involved in severe mountain warfare fighting until December,when the corps HQ was pulled out of the line in preparation for an amphibious assault, codenamed Operation Shingle.

After the initial success of the landings at Anzio on January 22, and with little German resistance in the area, Lucas had the opportunity to break out of the beachhead and cut off the supply lines of the German 10th Army by crossing Highways 6 and 7, leaving the way open to Rome. He failed to seize the opportunity, deciding instead to wait until all of his ground troops had landed and the beachhead had been fully secured. Only 8 days after the landing on January 30, 1944, did Lucas order the British and American troops to advance on Cisterna and Campoleone. It was too late. General Albert Kesselring, on orders from Hitler, had rushed troops from outside Italy to the beachhead: now, on January 31, 1944, 8 German divisions surrounded the beachhead. Churchill was angry and furious, bewildered by the slow reactions of the American commander: "I had hoped we were hurling a wildcat onto the shore, but all we got was a beached whale."

On February 6, 1944, the German 14th Army began the process of reducing the Allied beachhead. On February 16 General Eberhard von Mackensen deployed 6 divisions of his 14th Army in a full-scale counterattack in an attempt to push the British and Americans back into the sea. The German counterattack was eventually held, particularly with the use of overwhelming firepower: from the air, ground artillery and offshore ships batteries.

On February 22, 1944, Lucas was relieved of VI Corps command after Shingle, the amphibious landing at Anzio. Lucas was highly critical of the plans for the Anzio battle, believing his force was not strong enough to accomplish its mission. His confidence was not reinforced when the mission was scaled back by last-minute orders and advice from his commander, Lieutenant General Mark W. Clark, who told him, "Don't stick your neck out, Johnny. I did at Salerno and got into trouble.

After nine days of preparation to reinforce his position and four weeks of extremely tough fighting, Lucas was relieved by Clark and replaced with Major General Lucian K. Truscott as the commander of VI Corps at Anzio. Lucas spent three weeks as Clark's deputy at Fifth Army Headquarters before returning to the United States.

Although relieved of his command and bitter towards Clark and the British, who he believed had used him as a scapegoat, Lucas's achievements during the fighting in Italy were still recognized with the award of the Army Distinguished Service Medal, the Navy Distinguished Service Medal, and the Silver Star. The Navy DSM's citation reads:

The President of the United States of America takes pleasure in presenting the Navy Distinguished Service Medal to Major General John Porter Lucas (ASN: 0-3101), United States Army, for exceptionally meritorious and distinguished service in a position of great responsibility to the Government of the United States. As Commanding General, VI Corps, U.S. Army, he was in command of the Combined British and United States attack forces which effected the assault and occupation of the beachhead of Anzio-Nettuno, Italy, on 22 January 1944. His thorough planning, extensive experience, and excellent cooperation made possible the successful execution of this difficult and hazardous amphibious assault despite a short preparatory period of less than thirty days. By his superior judgment, courage, and stamina, he directed this critical operation in which two reinforced Allied Army Divisions contained as many as twelve enemy divisions, and thereby contributed immeasurably to the defeat of the enemy in Italy. His personal courage, determination, and outstanding leadership were in keeping with the highest traditions of the United States Armed Services.

In March 1944, Lucas was assigned as deputy commander and later as commander of the U.S. Fourth Army, headquartered at Fort Sam Houston, Texas.

== Post-war service and final years ==
After the war, he was made chief of the US Military Advisory Group to the Nationalist Chinese government, led by Generalissimo Chiang Kai-shek (1946–1948). In 1948, he was assigned as deputy commander of the reactivated Fifth Army in Chicago, Illinois. While still on active duty in that post, he died suddenly at Naval Station Great Lakes Naval Hospital, near Chicago on December 24, 1949. He is buried in Arlington National Cemetery with his wife Sydney Virginia Lucas (1892–1959). An obituary written by long-time associate and friend Major General Laurence B. Keiser appeared in the October 1950 issue of The Assembly, the magazine of the Association of West Point graduates.

== Memorialization ==
A camp in Sault Ste. Marie, Michigan, was named after MG Lucas in honor of his service. The polo field at Fort Sill, Oklahoma, was renamed Lucas Field in his honor. Lucas was widely known as a polo player in his youth. Lucas Street at Fort Sill is also named in his honor. On June 28, 1962, Lucas Place at Fort Eustis was named in his honor.

== Awards and decorations ==
=== Decorations ===
Distinguished Service Medal with Oak leaf Cluster
Navy Distinguished Service Medal
Silver Star
Purple Heart
Mexican Service Medal
World War I Victory Medal with one service clasp
American Defense Service Medal
American Campaign Medal
European-African-Middle Eastern Campaign Medal with four campaign stars
World War II Victory Medal
Grand Officer of the Order of Saints Maurice and Lazarus
Grand Cordon of the Order of the Cloud and Banner

=== Dates of rank ===
2nd Lieutenant (Regular Army) (RA) – June 13, 1911
1st Lieutenant (RA) – July 1, 1916
Captain (RA) – May 15, 1917
Major (Temporary) – January 15, 1918
Lieutenant Colonel (Temporary) – October 30, 1918
Captain (RA) – January 20, 1920
Major (RA) – July 1, 1920
Lieutenant Colonel (RA) – August 1, 1935
Colonel (RA) – May 2, 1940
Brigadier General (Army of the United States) (AUS) – October 1, 1940
Major General (AUS) – August 5, 1941
Major General (RA) – January 24, 1948

== Miscellany ==
John Porter Lucas was a Freemason, having been entered (February 20, 1919), passed (March 6, 1919), and raised (March 10, 1919) in the Elk Branch Lodge No. 93, Shenandoah Junction, WV. He is also believed to have been a member of the York Rite, attaining the degree of Knight Templar. According to his obituary in the October 1950 issue of the Assembly, he had served as a Past Master of a Lodge of Freemasons in Fort Collins, Colorado.

== Media depiction ==
In the movie Anzio the character of the over-cautious "General Lesley" (played by Arthur Kennedy) is presumably based on John P. Lucas.

Military offices
Preceded by Charles P. Hall	Commanding General 3rd Infantry Division; 1941–1942	Succeeded by Jonathan W. Anderson
Preceded by Joseph Stilwell	Commanding General III Corps; 1942–1943	Succeeded by Harold R. Bull
Preceded by Omar Bradley	Commanding General II Corps; September 1943	Succeeded by Geoffrey Keyes
Preceded by Ernest J. Dawley	Commanding General VI Corps; 1943–1944	Succeeded by Lucian Truscott
Preceded by William Hood Simpson	Commanding General Fourth Army; 1944–1945	Succeeded by Alexander Patch
