= Ernest J. Dawley =

US Army general (1886–1973)

Ernest Joseph Dawley
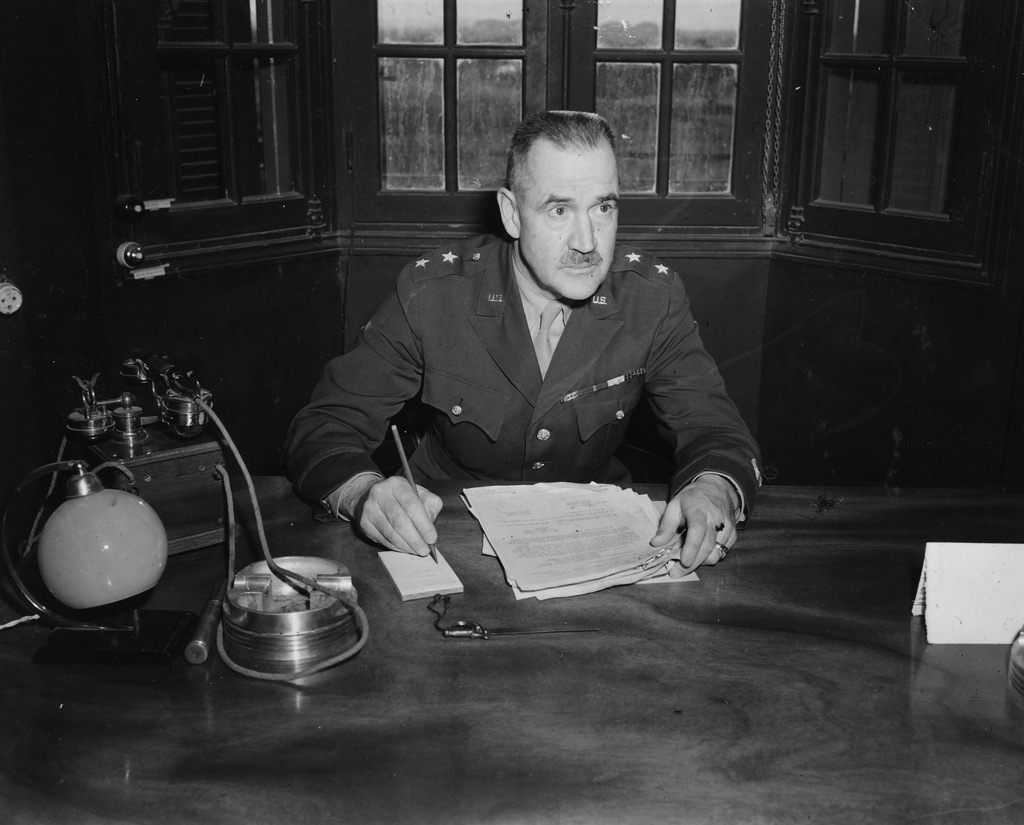
- Major General Ernest J. Dawley at his desk, c. 1943
- Born: 17 February 1886; Antigo, Wisconsin, US
- Died: 8 September 1973 (aged 87); Fort Ord, California, US
- Military career
- Allegiance: United States
- Branch: United States Army
- Service years: 1910–1947
- Rank: Major general
- Nickname: "Mike"
- Service number: 0-2843
- Unit: Field Artillery Branch
- Commands: 82nd Field Artillery Regiment; 40th Infantry Division; VI Corps; Army Tank Destroyer School; Army Tank Destroyer Center; Ground Force Reinforcement Command, European Theater of Operations
- Conflicts: World War I World War II
- Awards: Army Distinguished Service Medal (2); Silver Star; Purple Heart (2); Army Commendation Medal

Signature
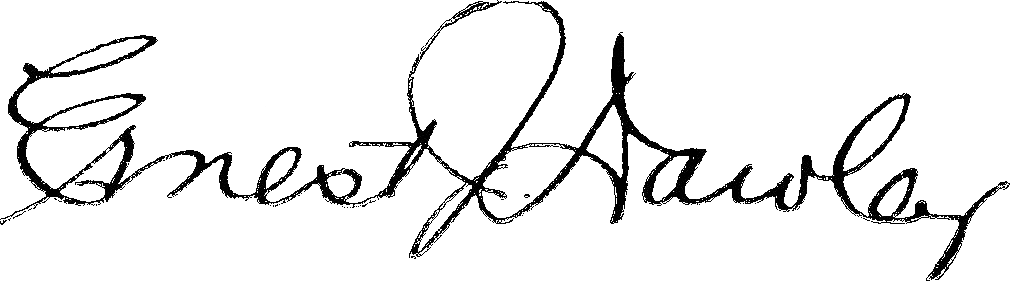

Major General Ernest Joseph "Mike" Dawley (17 February 1886 – 10 December 1973) was a senior officer of the United States Army, best known during World War II for commanding the VI Corps during Operation Avalanche, the Allied landings at Salerno, Italy, in 1943. After the landings, he was relieved of his command by Lieutenant General Mark W. Clark, commander of the Fifth Army, and returned to the United States.

== Early life and military career ==
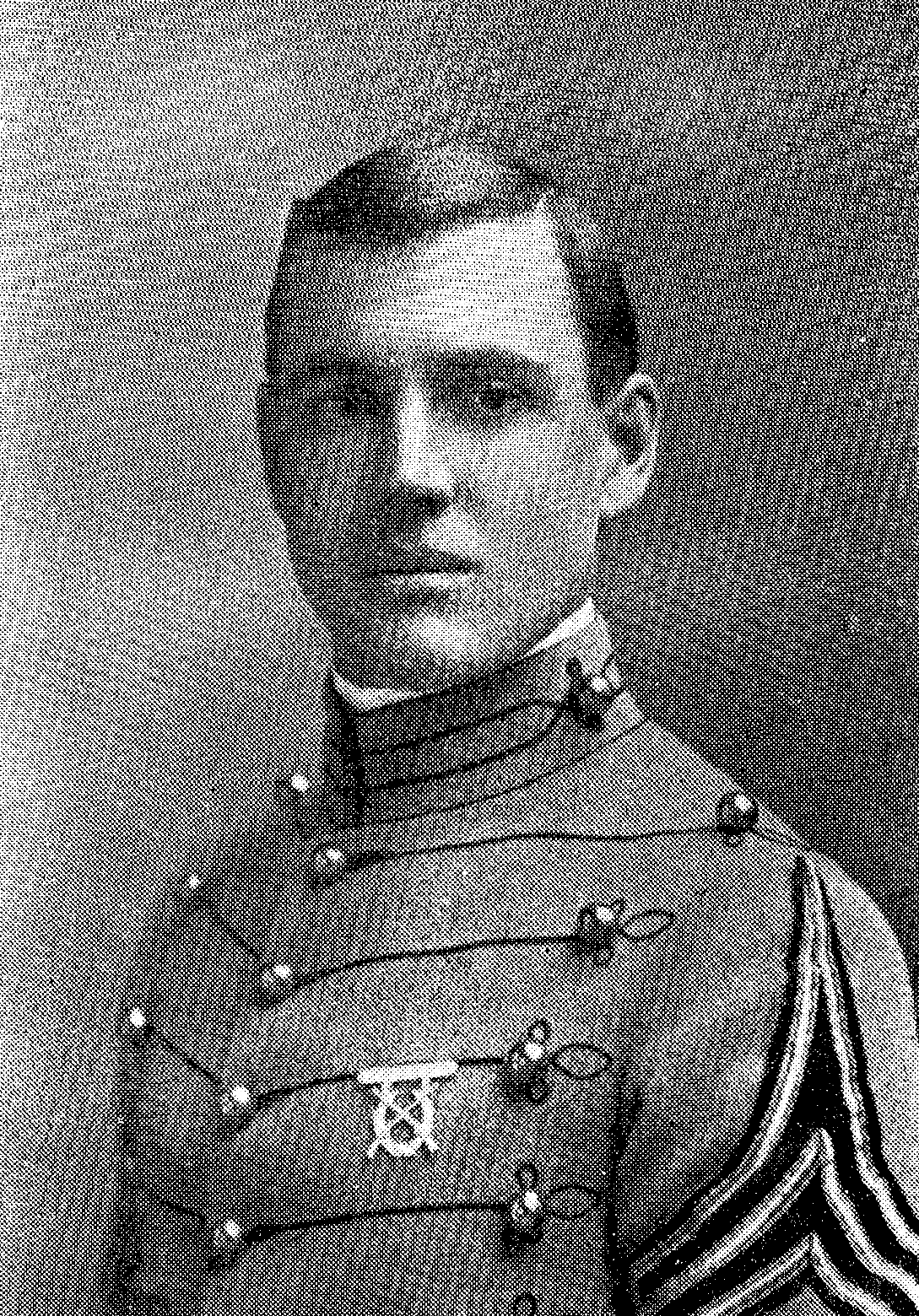
Dawley at West Point in 1910

Dawley was born on 17 February 1886 in Antigo, Wisconsin. After graduation from Ripon College in Ripon, Wisconsin, he entered the United States Military Academy (USMA) at West Point, New York, in 1906, at the age of 20. He graduated 24th in a class of 83 four years later on 15 June 1910 and was also commissioned as a second lieutenant into the Field Artillery Branch of the United States Army. Among his fellow graduates included men such as Frederick S. Strong Jr., Creswell Garlington, Oscar Solbert, Beverly C. Dunn, Donald H. Connolly, Raymond F. Fowler, David McCoach Jr., Fred C. Wallace, Burton O. Lewis, Harry Chamberlin, James I. Muir, John Millikin, Durward S. Wilson, Charles Hines, Walter H. Frank, Jack W. Heard, Frederick E. Uhl, Oscar Griswold, Duncan G. Richart, Robert H. Dunlop and Emil F. Reinhardt.

Dawley served in both the United States and in the Philippines, attending various schools. He took part in the Mexican Punitive Expedition in 1916, serving under the command of Brigadier General John J. Pershing.

== World War I ==
With the American entry into World War I, which occurred in April 1917, Dawley was transferred to the newly created 7th Field Artillery Regiment stationed at Fort Sam Houston, Texas. The 7th Field Artillery was assigned to the 1st Infantry Division. Together with his division Dawley, by now a captain (having been promoted in May), was sent to the Western Front as part of the American Expeditionary Forces (AEF), which was commanded by John Pershing, now a major general, who Dawley had served with in Mexico the previous year.

After arrival in France, Dawley attended a short course in l'Ecole d'Artillerie at Fontainebleau and was appointed the executive officer (XO) for the Saumur Artillery School. He was promoted to major in February 1918. He stayed in this capacity until May 1918, when he was transferred to the 12th Field Artillery Regiment, part of the 2nd Division. For his service with the 12th Field Artillery, Dawley was decorated with the Silver Citation Star for gallantry in action near Vierzy, France. The citation for the medal reads:

The President of the United States of America, authorized by Act of Congress July 9, 1918, takes pleasure in presenting the Silver Star to Major (Field Artillery) Ernest Joseph Dawley (ASN: 0-2843), United States Army, for gallantry in action while serving with the 12th Field Artillery Regiment, 2d Division, American Expeditionary Forces, in action near Vierzy, France, 21 July 1918, in reconnoitering battery positions under heavy shell and machine gun fire.

At the end of July 1918, he was transferred to the General Staff of the U.S. First Army. He was also promoted to the rank of lieutenant colonel in this capacity. He was briefly assistant chief of staff for the field artillery of the U.S. Second Army. During this assignment the war ended, on 11 November 1918. On 20 November he served with the 16th Field Artillery Regiment, part of the 4th Infantry Division.

Dawley remained in the army after the war, which ended on 11 November 1918, and in the subsequent interwar period.

== World War II ==
Prior to the war, Dawley was a colonel on the permanent army promotion list. In 1940, Dawley became division artillery commander of the 7th Infantry Division, commanded by Major General Joseph Stilwell. He was then appointed temporary brigadier general, and in September 1941 Dawley took command of the 40th Infantry Division, an Army National Guard formation. December 1941 saw the American entry into World War II, due to the Japanese attack on Pearl Harbor.

In April 1942 he was promoted by his close friend, Lieutenant General Lesley J. McNair, commander of Army Ground Forces, to the temporary rank of major general and given command of the VI Corps. In early 1943, the corps was sent to the Mediterranean Theater of Operations (MTO), initially to participate in the Allied invasion of Sicily in July, where it was to come under command of the Seventh Army, commanded by Lieutenant General George S. Patton. However, Lieutenant General Omar Bradley's II Corps, which had been in action in the Allied campaign in North Africa, was chosen instead, as Patton disliked the idea of relying so heavily on a man who had not yet seen any action in this war.

The VI Corps was instead selected for participation in the Allied invasion of Italy, coming under command of Lieutenant General Mark W. Clark's U.S. Fifth Army. The relationship between Clark and Dawley was not always easy, with Clark being a decade younger than Dawley and less senior. VI Corps comprised the 36th Infantry Division, under Major General Fred L. Walker, and the 45th Infantry Division, under Major General Troy H. Middleton, both National Guard divisions. Both Walker and Middleton had, like Dawley, fought in World War I. The corps took part in the Allied invasion of Italy at Salerno on 9 September 1943, with the British X Corps also under Fifth Army command, as part of Operation Avalanche. The stiffness of the German defenses sorely tested VI Corps, inflicting heavy casualties. German attempts to throw the American force back into the sea were thwarted by the artillery of both divisions, strongly supported by naval and aerial bombardment and the approach of the British Eighth Army from the south.

Although thought highly of by many officers, Dawley had been moved on by Patton in Sicily (although this was mainly due to Patton wanting an experienced corps commander) and his suitability for high command had been questioned by the Supreme Allied Commander in the MTO, General Dwight D. Eisenhower, and British General Sir Harold Alexander, the 15th Army Group commander, who described Dawley as a "broken reed" and suggested to Clark that Dawley be immediately replaced. After the problems at Salerno, during which Clark brought in Major General Matthew Ridgway, commander of the 82nd Airborne Division, to act as the VI Corps deputy commander, Dawley was relieved of command of VI Corps by Clark on 20 September 1943. Many, including both Walker and Middleton, along with Colonel James M. Gavin, commander of the 505th Parachute Infantry Regiment (part of the 82nd Airborne Division and who later rose to the rank of major general and was given command of that division), believed Clark used Dawley as a scapegoat to cover his own failures and thought Clark should be the one to go. In particular, Gavin, who spent a lot of time with Dawley at Salerno, believed that Dawley did as well as could be expected under the circumstances. Nevertheless, Dawley was replaced as VI Corps commander by Major General John P. Lucas, who was in turn replaced in February 1944 during Operation Shingle some five months later.

Dawley left Salerno for Algiers, where he was to meet with Eisenhower; however, Eisenhower was not available, and Dawley was handed a brief letter informing him that by command of General Eisenhower, as of 23 September 1943 his temporary rank of major general was terminated, and as of 24 September 1943 he was reverted to his permanent Regular Army rank of colonel in the Field Artillery. Dawley returned to the United States and was assigned as the commander of the Tank Destroyer School and Center at Camp Hood, Texas, the first of several appointments to military training establishments. Upon his retirement on 30 September 1947. he was promoted to brigadier general. However, the Biographical Dictionary of World War II Generals states that he was "commanding general" of the Tank Destroyer Center from February 1944 to March 1945.

After Dawley retired from the army in 1947, he was promoted to the rank of major general (retired) on 29 June 1948.

== Postwar ==
Dawley died on 8 September 1973 at Silas B. Hays Army Hospital at Fort Ord, California, almost exactly 30 years since the Salerno landings. His body was cremated and ashes scattered at sea.

== Decorations ==
Here is the ribbon bar of Major General Dawley:

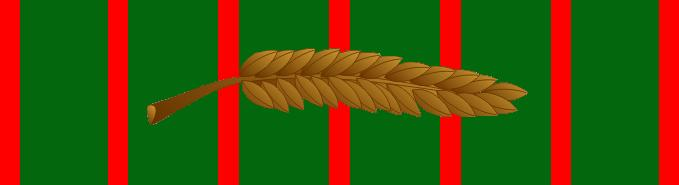

| 1st Row | Army Distinguished Service Medal with Oak Leaf Cluster | | Silver Star | |
| 2nd Row | Army Commendation Medal | Purple Heart with Oak Leaf Cluster | World War I Victory Medal with four Battle Clasps | American Defense Service Medal |
| 3rd Row | American Campaign Medal | European-African-Middle Eastern Campaign Medal with three service stars | World War II Victory Medal | Commander of the Order of the British Empire (United Kingdom) |
| 4th Row | Officer of the Legion of Honor (France) | Officer of the Ordre de l'Étoile Noire (France) | French Croix de Guerre 1914–1918 with Palm | Moroccan Order of Ouissam Alaouite, Grade Officer |

== Bibliography ==
- Hickey, Des; Smith, Gus (1984). Operation Avalanche: The Salerno Landings, 1943. McGraw Hill. p. 33. ISBN 0-07-028682-5.
- Taaffe, Stephen R. (2013). Marshall and His Generals: U.S. Army Commanders in World War II. Lawrence, Kansas: University Press of Kansas. ISBN 978-0-7006-1942-9. OCLC 840162019.

Military offices
| Preceded by Walter P. Story | Commanding General 40th Infantry Division; 1941–1942 | Succeeded by Rapp Brush |
| Preceded by George Grunert | Commanding General VI Corps; 1942–1943 | Succeeded by John P. Lucas |
