= Karl Truesdell =

U.S. Army major general (1882–1955)

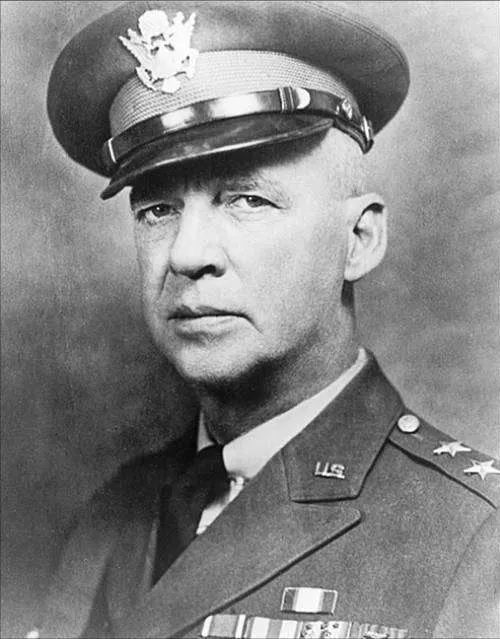
- 16th Infantry Regiment Association photo of Truesdell as a major general, circa 1944
- Born: August 27, 1882; Moorhead, Minnesota
- Died: July 16, 1955 (aged 72); Silver Lake, New York
- Burial place: Arlington National Cemetery
- Spouse: Mary Maurice Smith (m. 1907–1955)
- Children: 2
- Relatives: Stephen Return Riggs (grandfather)
- Military career
- Allegiance: United States
- Branch: United States Army
- Service years: 1901–1945
- Rank: Major General
- Service number: O-1881
- Units: Coast Artillery Corps; Signal Corps; Infantry Branch
- Commands: USAMP Cyrus W. Field; Company I, 25th Infantry Regiment; 16th Infantry Regiment; 12th Infantry Brigade; 1st Infantry Division; VI Corps; United States Army Command and General Staff College
- Conflicts: Second Occupation of Cuba; World War I World War II
- Awards: Army Distinguished Service Medal (2); Order of the British Empire (Honorary Commander)

Karl Truesdell (August 27, 1882 – July 16, 1955) was a career officer in the United States Army who attained the rank of major general and was a veteran of both World War I and World War II. He was most notable for his leadership assignments as commander of the 1st Infantry Division and VI Corps, and commandant of the United States Army Command and General Staff College.

A native of Moorhead, Minnesota, Truesdell was raised in Washington, D.C., and graduated from Central High School in 1901. He enlisted in the United States Army, and served in the Coast Artillery Corps until 1904. He attained the rank of sergeant, and served until 1904, when he passed the examination for a commission and received appointment as a second lieutenant of Infantry. Truesdell served in Infantry assignments until 1912, when he was detailed for service in the Signal Corps. During World War I, he was the signal officer on the staffs of the 1st Division and V Corps, for which he received the Army Distinguished Service Medal.

Following his World War I service, Truesdell returned to the Infantry branch and continued to rise through the ranks in command and staff positions, including command of the 16th Infantry Regiment, 12th Infantry Brigade, and 1st Infantry Division. During World War II, he commanded the VI Corps and the United States Army Command and General Staff College, for which he received a second award of the Army Distinguished Service Medal and the Order of the British Empire (Honorary Commander). He retired at the end of 1945.

In retirement, Truesdell was a resident of Chevy Chase, Maryland, and maintained a summer home in Silver Lake, New York. He died in Silver Lake on July 16, 1955, and was buried at Arlington National Cemetery.

== Early life ==
Karl Truesdell was born in Moorhead, Minnesota, on August 27, 1882, a son of Julius A. Truesdell and Cornelia (Riggs) Truesdell. His maternal grandfather was Stephen Return Riggs and his siblings included Stephen Return Truesdell, a U.S. Army lieutenant colonel and civil engineer with the Chicago and North Western Transportation Company, and Horace Warner Truesdell, a U.S. government agricultural scientist, socialist political activist, and U.S. Army captain who grew apples on a farm in Bluemont, Virginia.

Julius Truesdell was a newspaper reporter and editor; he relocated to Washington, D.C., soon after Truesdell's birth. Truesdell attended the public schools of Washington and was a graduate of Washington's Central High School. While in high school he was a member of Washington's YMCA Corps of Cadets, which was composed of uniformed students who took part in military drill and ceremony competitions. After his 1901 graduation, Truesdell enlisted in the United States Army with the intention of qualifying for an officer's commission. He quickly advanced from private to corporal to sergeant as a member of Fort Monroe, Virginia's 73rd and 74th Coast Artillery Companies.

== Early career ==
In 1903, Truesdell took part in the competitive examination process for appointment as an officer. He passed, and in June 1904 he received his commission as a second lieutenant in the 5th Infantry Regiment. Truesdell joined his regiment at Plattsburgh Barracks, New York and his initial assignments included escorting military prisoners from the Castle Williams penitentiary on Governors Island, New York to the United States Disciplinary Barracks at Fort Leavenworth, Kansas. In August 1907, Truesdell was assigned as quartermaster and commissary officer of the 5th Infantry's 2nd Battalion and posted to Sagua La Grande during the Second Occupation of Cuba. Truesdell returned to the United States in 1909, and his duties after rejoining his regiment included assisting in planning and overseeing execution of 1909's annual Civilian Marksmanship Program National Matches at Camp Perry, Ohio. In March 1911, Truesdell was promoted to first lieutenant in the 15th Infantry Regiment.

In March 1912, Truesdell was detailed to the Signal Corps. After beginning the Signal Officers Course at Fort Leavenworth's Army Service Schools, he completed the course with Field Company A, Signal Corps, at Fort Omaha, Nebraska. On May 29, 1912, Truesdell was one of several officers taking part in a hot air balloon flight to learn how balloons facilitated radio communications. What was supposed to be a short familiarization flight over Fort Omaha became the subject of nationwide headlines on May 29 and 30 when the pilot lost control and the balloon was no longer visible to observers on the ground. Several hours later, the pilot made a successful nighttime landing in Burlington Junction, Missouri, about 80 miles from Fort Omaha, which was reported in newspapers throughout the United States on May 30 and May 31.

After serving with Field Company A, Truesdell departed Fort Omaha in November 1912 to assume command of USAMP Cyrus W. Field, an army cable laying ship that carried out installation and maintenance of military telegraph and telephone cables along the Atlantic coast. In May 1913, Truesdell relinquished command and was assigned as assistant to the chief signal officer on the staff of the army's Eastern Department, which was based at Fort Jay on Governors Island. In February 1914, was assigned to duty with Field Company I, Signal Corps, at Fort Bliss, Texas. In April 1914, he was reassigned to Fort Sam Houston, Texas for duty with Field Company H, Signal Corps.

In February 1915, Truesdell was assigned to the 25th Infantry Regiment with duty at Texas City, Texas. In July 1915, he returned to Plattsburgh Barracks as inspector of training for an army instruction encampment. In December 1915, Truesdell rejoined the 25th Infantry at Schofield Barracks, Hawaii. He was promoted to captain in November 1916 and assigned as commander of the regiment's Company I.

== World War I ==
In the summer of 1917, Truesdell was promoted to temporary major and assigned to signal duty with the 33rd Division. In the fall of 1917, Truesdell was with the 33rd Division as it completed organization and training at Camp Logan, Texas prior to departing for service in France.

After arrival in France, Truesdell served as signal officer for first the 1st Division, and later the V Corps. He was commended for his work to establish telephone and radio networks that enabled American Expeditionary Forces units to communicate with each other, which facilitated success in combat by making it easier to gain and maintain situational awareness, transmit orders and reports, and coordinate for artillery support, logistics and transportation, and combat health support. During the war, Truesdell was promoted to temporary lieutenant colonel and then temporary colonel, and after the war he received the Army Distinguished Service Medal in recognition of his superior performance. Following the Armistice of November 11, 1918, which ended the war, Truesdell remained in France as the U.S. member of the Inter-Allied Radio Conference, which considered regulations intended to facilitate the development of radio for commercial use.

== Post-World War I ==
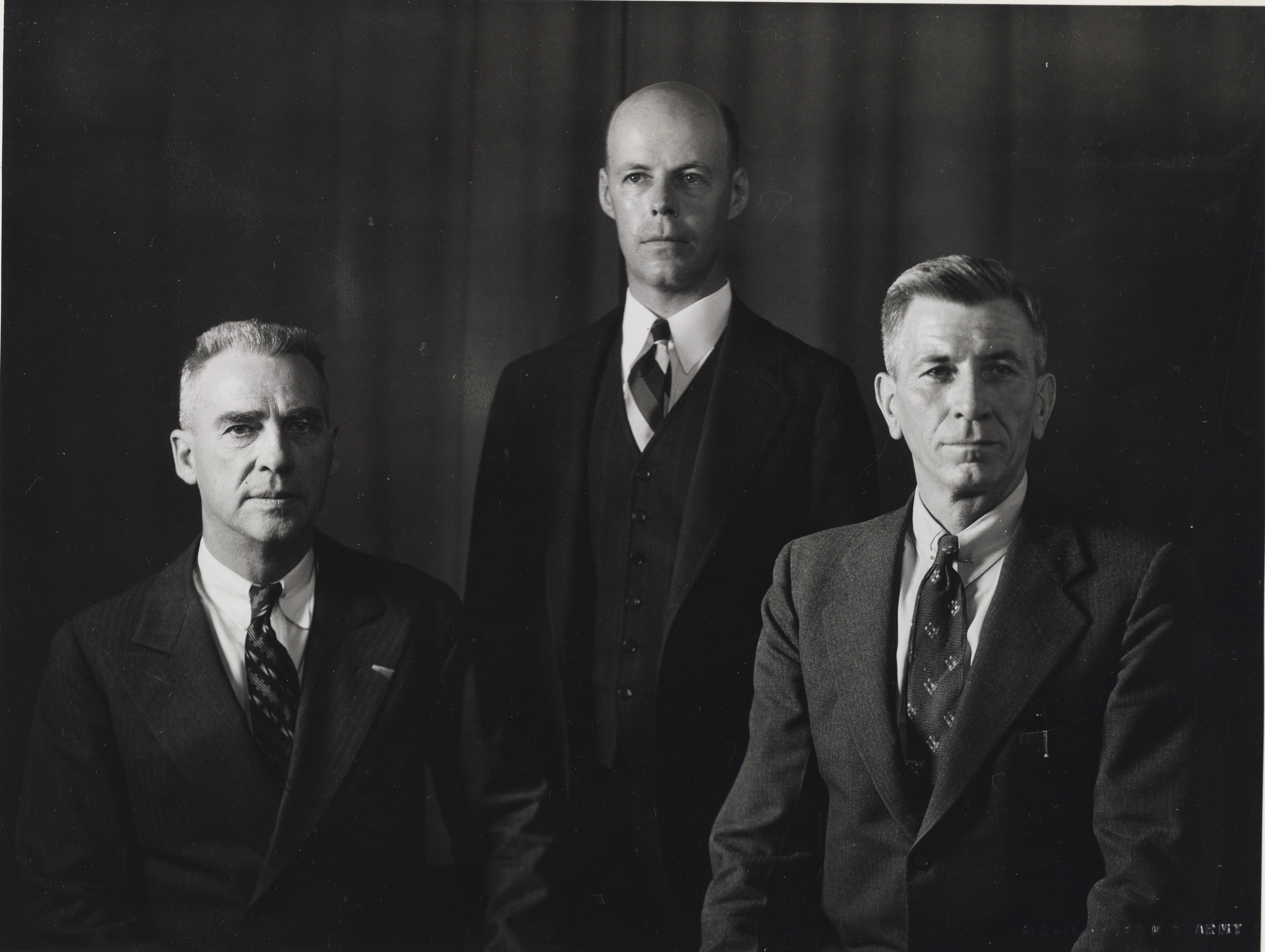
L to R: Army officers Truesdell, Avery Cooper, and Joseph D. Patch, May 8, 1936

Upon returning to the United States in late summer 1919, Truesdell was assigned as assistant commandant of the Signal School. In June 1920, now returned to his permanent rank of captain, Truesdell was assigned to the Fort Leavenworth School of the Line as a student. Now a major, he completed the course in June 1921 and attained distinction as an honor graduate. After graduating, Truesdell remained at Fort Leavenworth to attend the United States Army Command and General Staff College. While attending the staff college, Truesdell served concurrently as an instructor. He graduated in 1922, and remained at the school as a faculty member. In 1926, he graduated from the United States Army War College.

In December 1926, Truesdell was assigned to duty at the War Department as a member of the Army General Staff. In 1927, he completed the course at the Naval War College. Now a lieutenant colonel, in October 1931 Truesdell began attendance at a refresher course for Infantry officers which was offered at the Fort Benning Infantry School. From 1932 to 1935, Truesdell was executive officer of the 15th Infantry Regiment, which was stationed in Tianjin, China. After returning to the United States, Truesdell was promoted to colonel and assigned to command the 16th Infantry Regiment at Fort Jay on Governors Island.

Truesdell was promoted to brigadier general in April 1938. After his promotion, Truesdell was assigned to command the 6th Infantry Division's 12th Infantry Brigade at Fort Sheridan, Illinois. From October 1939 to December 1940, Truesdell served as commander of the 1st Infantry Division, first at Fort Benning, and later on Governors Island and at Fort Hamilton. During his command, Truesdell oversaw the division's individual and collective training in anticipation of U.S. entry into World War II. He was promoted to major general in October 1940.

== World War II ==
In January 1941, Truesdell was assigned to command VI Corps with headquarters in Providence, Rhode Island. While in this position, Truesdell oversaw the training of units in New York and New England, including the 1st Infantry Division and the 26th Infantry Division, as they prepared to travel overseas for combat.

In January 1942, Truesdell was assigned to the Panama Canal Zone as deputy commander of the Caribbean Defense Command. He served in Panama only briefly because in March 1942 he was assigned to Fort Leavenworth as commandant of the Command and General Staff College. While serving as commandant, Truesdell oversaw modernization of the curriculum, which ensured that officers learning skills that would enable them to serve on staffs at division level and higher worked with the geography, scenarios, and techniques of World War II rather than outdated scenarios and information. In addition, women attended staff college courses for the first time when officers of the Women's Army Corps detailed to the Services of Supply were enrolled as students in courses on logistics management.

Truesdell remained in command through the end of the war and retired in November 1945. His wartime service was recognized with a second award of the Army Distinguished Service Medal. In addition, Truesdell received the Order of the British Empire (Honorary Commander) to recognize his efforts to educate British officers at the Command and General Staff College and conduct student and instructor exchanges with the British staff college.

== Later life ==
In retirement, Truesdell was a resident of Chevy Chase, Maryland, and maintained a summer home in Silver Lake. He died at his summer home on July 16, 1955. Truesdell was buried at Arlington National Cemetery.

== Family ==
In April 1907, Truesdell married Mary Maurice Smith (1886–1960). They were the parents of a son, Karl Truesdell Jr. (1908–1978) and a daughter, Cecile Olive (1910–1997). The younger Karl Truesdell was a career officer in the United States Army Air Forces and United States Air Force, and attained the rank of major general. Cecile Truesdell was the wife of army Brigadier General Edgar Thomas Conley Jr. Conley was the son of Major General Edgar Thomas Conley.

Military offices
Preceded by Walter Short	Commanding General 1st Infantry Division; 1939–1940	Succeeded by Donald C. Cubbison
Preceded by Newly activated organization	Commanding General VI Corps; 1940–1941	Succeeded by George Grunert
Preceded by Horace H. Fuller (last permanent commandant)	Commandant of the Command and General Staff School; 1942–1945	Succeeded by Leonard T. Gerow
