= George Grunert =

United States Army general

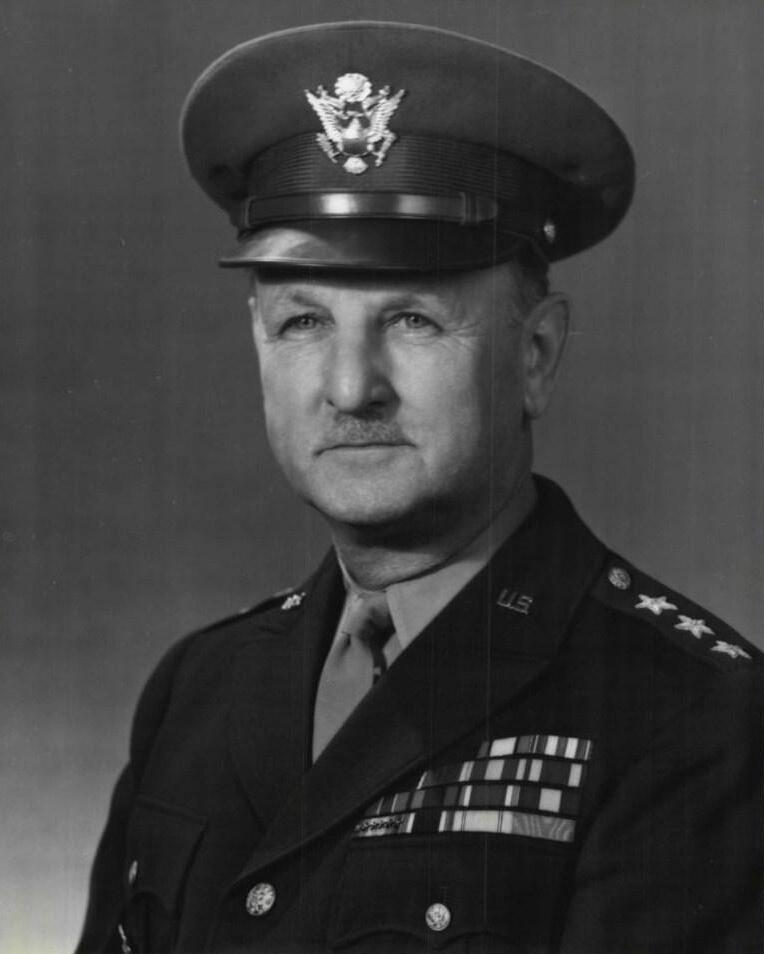
- Born: July 21, 1881; White Haven, Pennsylvania, U.S.
- Died: January 12, 1971 (aged 89); San Antonio, Texas, U.S.
- Military career
- Allegiance: United States
- Branch: United States Army
- Service years: 1898–1945
- Rank: Lieutenant general
- Service number: 0-1534
- Units: Cavalry Branch
- Commands: Eastern Defense Command; Second Service Corps Area; First United States Army; Sixth Service Corps Area; Philippine Department; 26th Cavalry Regiment; 10th Cavalry Regiment
- Conflicts: Spanish–American War; Philippine–American War; World War I World War II
- Awards: Army Distinguished Service Medal (2); Silver Star; Legion of Merit; Purple Heart

George Grunert (July 21, 1881 – January 12, 1971) was a United States Army cavalry officer who worked his way up through the ranks from private to retirement as a lieutenant general. His 47-year career extended from the Spanish–American War to the end of World War II.

== Education and early career ==
George Grunert was born in White Haven, Pennsylvania, on July 21, 1881, a son of David Grunert and Henrietta (Hollmann) Grunert. He graduated from White Haven High School in 1898 and joined the United States Army for the Spanish–American War. Enlisting as a private in the 2nd Artillery Regiment, he performed coast artillery duties in the Philippines, Cuba and on the west coast of the United States. He advanced through the ranks to corporal, sergeant, and quartermaster sergeant, and was serving at Fort Monroe in Virginia, when his application for a commission was approved. Grunert was commissioned as a second lieutenant of Cavalry in February 1901. He accepted in April and was assigned to the 11th Cavalry Regiment. By 1908 he was stationed in Cuba and in 1910 he was assigned to Fort Oglethorpe, Georgia.

== World War I and the inter-war years ==
Grunert was sent to France as an observer with British forces in 1917 during World War I. During the American build up, he served as assistant chief of staff for I Corps and was awarded the Army Distinguished Service Medal for his work during the United States offensives of 1918. The citation for the medal reads:

The President of the United States of America, authorized by Act of Congress, July 9, 1918, takes pleasure in presenting the Army Distinguished Service Medal to Lieutenant Colonel (Cavalry) George Grunert, United States Army, for exceptionally meritorious and distinguished services to the Government of the United States, in a duty of great responsibility during World War I. With remarkable skill, constantly displaying zeal and high military attainments, Lieutenant Colonel Grunert performed his exacting duties as Assistant Chief of Staff, G-1, of the 1st Corps, during the successive operations at Chateau-Thierry, on the Ourcq and Vesle, and in the St. Mihiel and Argonne-Meuse offensives. By his untiring and painstaking efforts and unusual ability he performed the most difficult tasks, rendering services of great value to the Government.

In 1919, Grunert attended the Army War College then at Washington Barracks, now Fort Lesley J. McNair, in Washington, D.C. He served with the 1st Infantry Division at Camp Dix, then to Washington, D.C., to serve in the office of the Army Chief of Staff. He returned to the field as a lieutenant colonel of the 10th Cavalry Regiment at Fort Huachuca in Arizona in 1925.

After a second tour of duty in the office of the Army Chief of Staff, Grunert attended the Command and General Staff School at Fort Leavenworth in Kansas from 1930 to 1932. In 1933, he was the director of military intelligence and espionage division course at the Army War College and in 1935, he became director of war plans division course.

In 1936, Grunert was posted to the Philippines as commanding officer of the 26th Cavalry Regiment (Philippine Scouts). He received his promotion to brigadier general in December 1936 in preparation for his command of the 23rd Brigade, a brigade of the Philippine Division composed of Philippine Scouts.

In November 1938 Grunert succeeded George C. Marshall in command of 5th Brigade at Vancouver Barracks, Washington. Grunert was promoted to major general in 1939 and, in October, returned to the Philippines to command the Philippine Division. From May 1940 to November 1941 Grunert commanded the Philippine Department, directing the United States Army supervision and control over the Philippine defense force until Douglas MacArthur came out of retirement to assume command in July 1941. MacArthur abolished the Philippine Department as a redundant command echelon in November 1941 and Grunert returned to the United States.

== World War II ==
The Japanese attack on Pearl Harbor occurred shortly after Grunert reached the United States, and he was shuffled between a number of assignments that included command of the Sixth Service Command at Fort Sheridan, Illinois, serving as the ranking military officer in the Chicago area, and two administrative posts with the Army Service Forces as Deputy Chief of Staff for Service Commands (Service of Supply) overseeing the nine United States-based supply and logistics commands (formerly corps areas), under General Brehon B. Somervell.

In August 1943, Grunert was appointed deputy commander for both the Eastern Defense Command, a continental defense command for the eastern United States, and First United States Army at Fort Jay, Governors Island in New York City, taking the place of General Hugh A. Drum upon his mandatory retirement at age 64 in October 1943 and being promoted to lieutenant general at the same time.

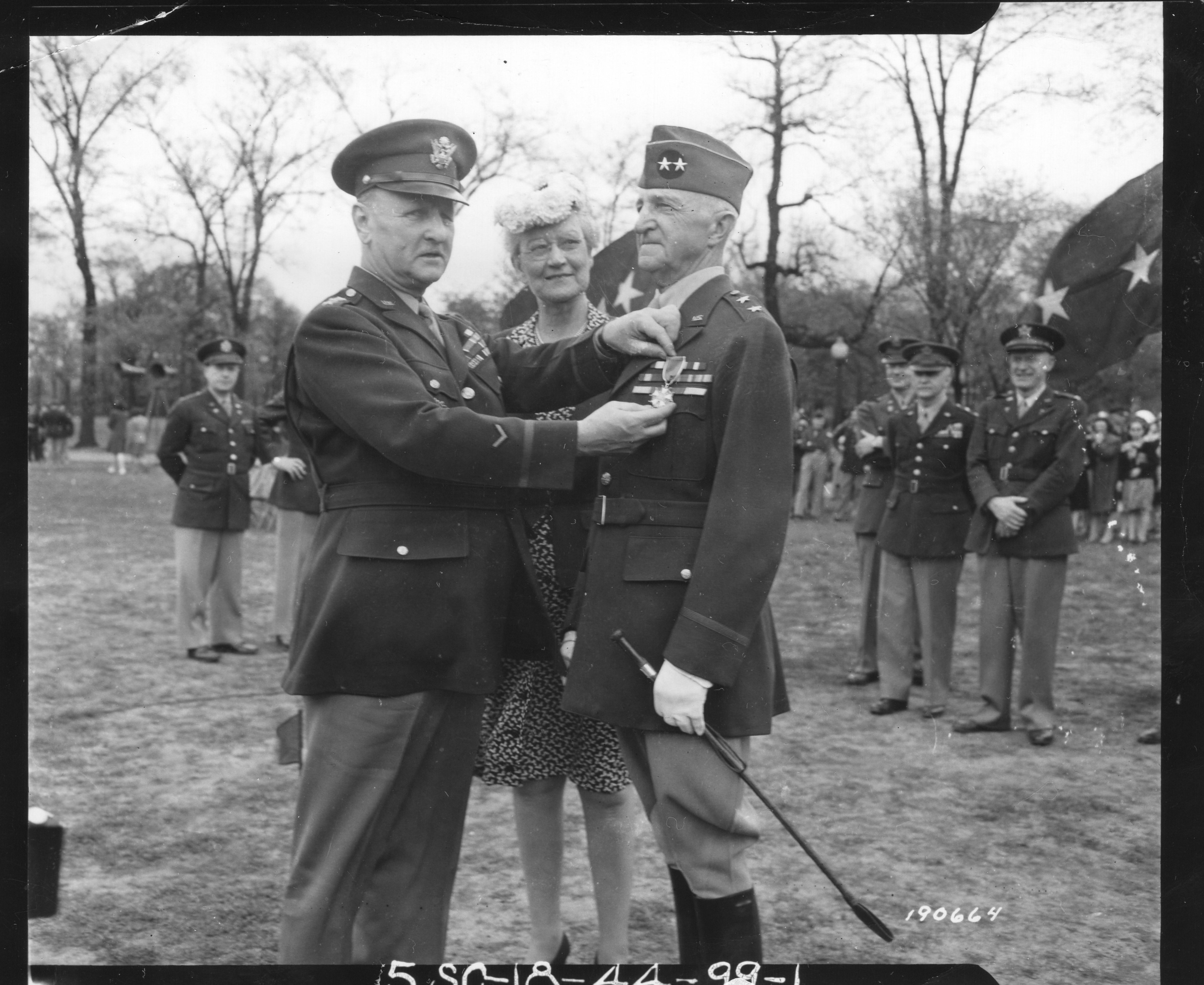
Lieutenant General George Grunert pins the Legion of Merit on Major General Daniel Van Voorhis at Fort Hayes, Ohio, May 1944.

Grunert held interim command over the First Army until January 1944 while Lieutenant General Omar Bradley completed assembling and staffing its new headquarters in England for the Normandy landings. Grunert continued command of the Eastern Defense Command, which also assumed the duties of the Central Defense Command, and the Second Service Command for the New York area until his retirement in July 1945.

== Pearl Harbor investigation ==
In June 1944, Grunert was appointed by Secretary of War Henry Stimson as the presiding officer of a secret panel that investigated the army response to events prior to the attack on Pearl Harbor. The Pearl Harbor Board report, released after the war, traced the entire military and diplomatic history prior to the attack finding much fault along the way, critical of break downs in communications between Secretary of State Cordell Hull, George C. Marshall and a failure of appropriate action by Hawaiian Department commander, Walter C. Short. The panel's method of investigation and conclusions are still subject to criticism today.

== Retirement ==
Grunert died at Brooke Army Hospital in San Antonio, Texas, on January 12, 1971, at age 89 and was buried at Fort Sam Houston National Cemetery. He was survived by his wife Florence Reynolds, daughter Mary and son-in-law, then First United States Army commander, Lieutenant General Jonathan O. Seaman at Fort Meade, Maryland. His son, Colonel George R. Grunert, attended the United States Military Academy, graduating with the class of 1930 and played on the army polo team. He was a veteran of World War II and Korea and preceded his father in death.

== Decorations ==
Ribbon bar with the list of General George Grunert's decorations:

1st row	Army Distinguished Service Medal with Oak Leaf Cluster		Silver Star	Legion of Merit
2nd row	Purple Heart	Spanish Campaign Medal	Army of Cuban Occupation Medal	Philippine Campaign Medal
3rd row	Army of Cuban Pacification Medal	Mexican Border Service Medal	World War I Victory Medal	Army of Occupation of Germany Medal
4th row	American Defense Service Medal	American Campaign Medal	World War II Victory Medal	Knight of the Legion of Honour

== Dates of rank ==
Various	Enlisted, United States Army: September 29, 1898
No pin insignia in 1901	Second lieutenant, Regular Army: February 2, 1901 (Appointment accepted on April 29, 1901.)
	First lieutenant, United States Army: April 16, 1908
	Captain, Regular Army: July 1, 1916
	Major, National Army: August 5, 1917
	Lieutenant colonel, National Army: July 30, 1918
	Colonel, National Army: April 27, 1919
	Captain, Regular Army: August 31, 1919 (Reverted to permanent rank.)
	Major, Regular Army : July 1, 1920
	Lieutenant colonel, Regular Army: April 27, 1921
	Colonel, Regular Army: August 1, 1932
	Brigadier general, Regular Army: November 1, 1936 (Accepted December 24, 1936.)
	Major general, Regular Army: December 1, 1939
	Lieutenant general, Temporary: October 8, 1943
	Lieutenant general, Army of the United States: January 29, 1944
	Lieutenant general, Retired List: August 1, 1945

== Citations ==
Military offices
Preceded by Karl Truesdell	Commanding General VI Corps; 1941–1942	Succeeded by Ernest J. Dawley
