= Jonathan O. Seaman =

United States Army general (1911–1986)

- Major General Jonathan Seaman, commanding 1st Infantry Division, Vietnam, c. 1966
- Born: December 11, 1911; Manila, Philippines
- Died: February 18, 1986 (aged 74); Charleston, South Carolina
- Military career
- Allegiance: United States
- Branch: United States Army
- Service years: 1934–1971
- Rank: Lieutenant General
- Commands: First United States Army; II Field Force; 1st Infantry Division; 30th Field Artillery Regiment
- Conflicts: World War II; Vietnam War
- Awards: Army Distinguished Service Medal (3); Silver Star; Legion of Merit; Distinguished Flying Cross; Bronze Star Medal

Lieutenant General Jonathan Owen Seaman (December 11, 1911 – February 18, 1986) was a career officer in the United States Army and a combat commander in World War II and the Vietnam War.

== Education and early career ==
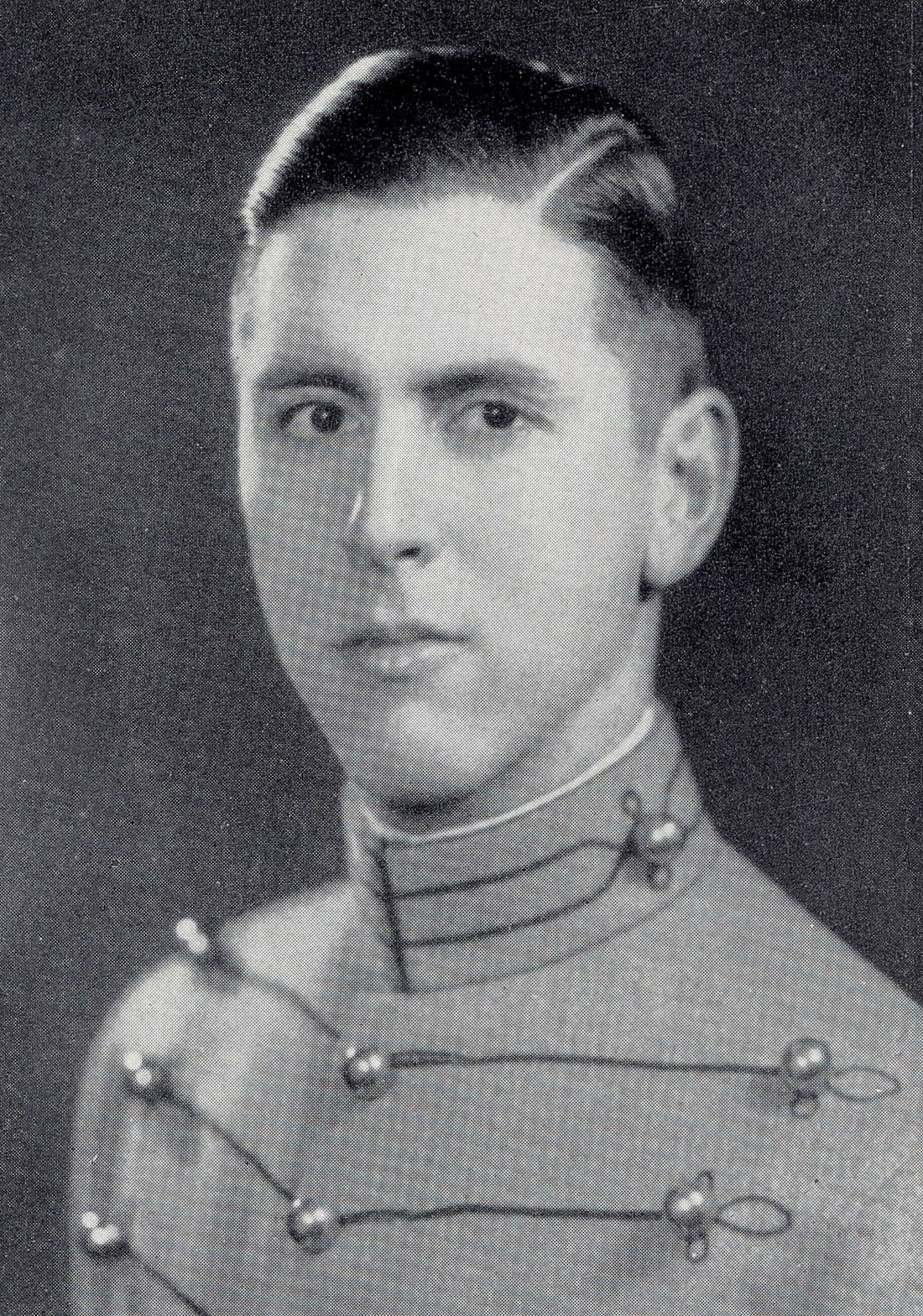
As a West Point Cadet c. 1934

Seaman was born in Manila, Philippines, the son of a United States Army officer, Brigadier General Albert Owen Seaman and his wife, Florence Thompson (Look) Seaman, 11 December 1911. He was appointed to United States Military Academy, graduating with the class of 1934 and was commissioned a second lieutenant in the 16th Field Artillery at Fort Myer, Virginia. In December 1935 to 1938, Seaman served as a White House military aide. After a teaching assignment at West Point in 1939, he was promoted to captain with the 4th Field Artillery at Fort Bragg.

== Military career ==
By 1942 Seaman was a major and battalion commander in the 4th Field Artillery regiment. He served in World War II in both European and Pacific theaters.

From 1953 to 1954, Seaman commanded the 30th Field Artillery Group at Yorkhof Kaserne, Germany. Seaman was honored in 1999 by the 30th Field Artillery when the 3rd Battalion headquarters at Fort Sill, Oklahoma was named "Seaman Hall".

=== Vietnam War ===
As a major general in 1965, Seaman was named commander of the 1st Infantry Division at Fort Riley, Kansas. The 1st Infantry Division was the first army combat division to be called up for service during the Vietnam War, arriving in theater in July 1965, with Seaman being the first of six combat commanders during the war. In March 1966, Seaman was promoted to commander of II Field Force, a 100,000 man fighting force that included the 1st Division, along with two other divisions and several independent brigades.

In 1967, Seaman returned stateside and assumed command of First United States Army at Fort Meade, Maryland. Seaman was the deciding official in cases of 13 officers involved in the failure to investigate or cover up the 1968 My Lai massacre during the Vietnam War.

== Retirement ==
In 1971, Seaman retired to Beaufort, South Carolina, after 37 years of active duty. Seaman died at the Veterans Administration Hospital in Charleston, South Carolina, on February 18, 1986, at age 74, He was buried at the Beaufort National Cemetery.

Seaman was married to Mary Grunert, daughter of United States Army general and former First United States Army commander George Grunert.
