= VI Corps (United States) =

U.S. Army corps (1918–1962)

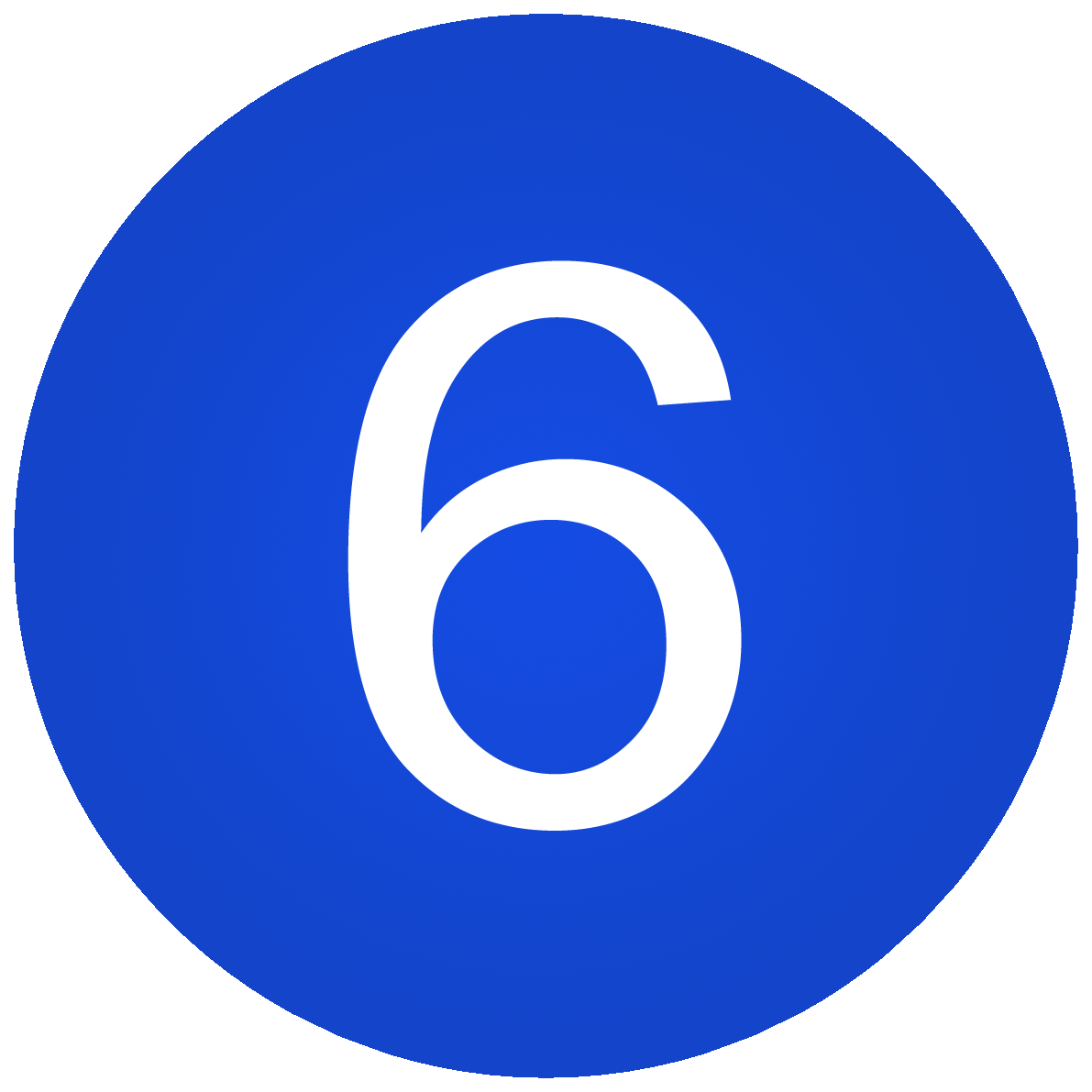
- Shoulder sleeve insignia
- Active: 23 July 1918–May 1919; 29 July 1921–1 May 1946; 1 May 1946–24 November 1950; 22 January 1951–1 April 1953; 22 November 1957–29 February 1968
- Country: United States of America
- Branch: United States Army
- Role: Headquarters
- Size: Corps
- Engagements: World War I; Lorraine 1918; World War II; Naples-Foggia; Anzio; Southern France; Rhineland; Ardennes-Alsace; Central Europe

Commanders
- Notable commanders: George Bell Jr. Ernest J. Dawley; John P. Lucas; Lucian Truscott; Edward H. Brooks

Insignia
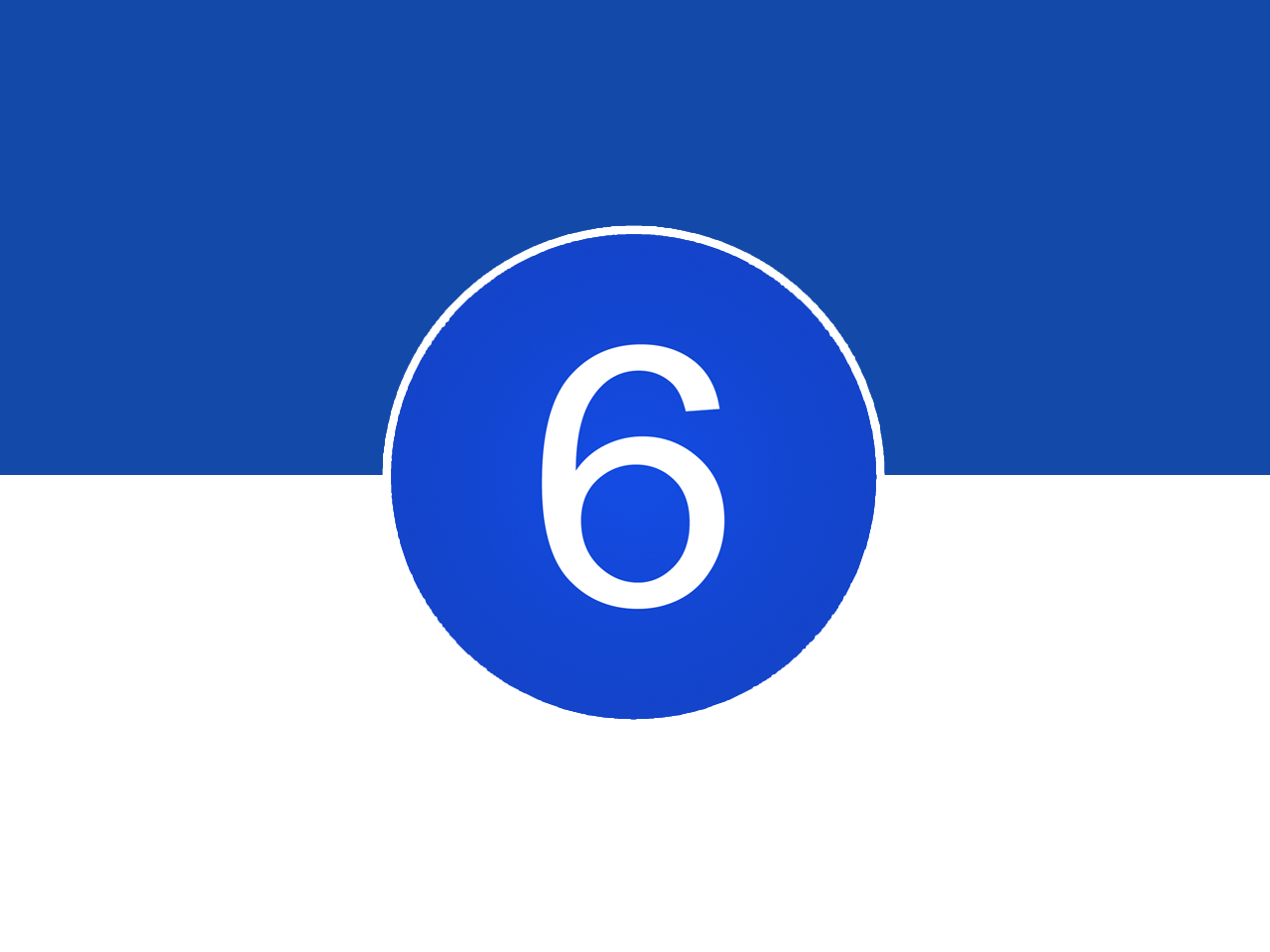
- VI Corps Flag

The VI Corps was a corps of the United States Army active on five occasions from 1918–1962. It was activated as VI Army Corps in August 1918 at Neufchâteau, France, serving in the Lorraine Campaign. Constituted in the Organized Reserves in 1921, it was allotted to the Regular Army in 1933 and activated on 1 August 1940 at Fort Sheridan, Illinois. VI Corps took part in some of the most high-profile operations in World War II.

By war's end it was part of the Seventh Army of the 6th Army Group. In early May 1945 its 103d Infantry Division, which had raced south through Bavaria into Innsbruck, Austria, met up with troops of the 349th Infantry, 88th Division in Vipiteno in the Italian Alps.

== History ==
=== World War I ===
The VI Corps was activated as VI Army Corps on 1 August 1918 at Neufchâteau, France. It served in the Lorraine Campaign (campaign streamer awarded). VI Corps commanders during World War I were Major General Omar Bundy, from 26 August through 12 September 1918; Major General Charles C. Ballou, from 23 October 1918 through 10 November 1918; Major General Charles T. Menoher, from 10 November 1918 (commanding corps at termination of hostilities). Major General Adelbert Cronkhite commanded from January to April, 1919. The corps was demobilized on 11 April 1919, at Villerupt, France. (Army Almanac, Stackpole, Mechanicsburg, Pennsylvania, 1958, p. 645)

=== Inter-War Period ===
The VI Corps was reconstituted in the Organized Reserves on 29 July 1921, and was organized in March 1922 at Chicago, Illinois, in the Sixth Corps Area, responsible for the 6th, 32nd, and 33rd Divisions. It was withdrawn from the Organized Reserves on 1 October 1933 and allotted to the Regular Army. The corps was activated on 1 August 1940 at Fort Sheridan, Illinois. The future-Abwehr agent Oscar C. Pfaus served in VI corps during the 1920s.

=== World War II ===
==== Italy ====
The VI Corps took part in some of the most high-profile operations in World War II. The corps, commanded by Major General Ernest J. Dawley, first saw combat during the Allied invasion of Italy when it landed at Salerno on 9 September 1943, along with the British X Corps, under the command of the U.S. Fifth Army as part of Operation Avalanche. The stiffness of the German defences sorely tested the VI Corps and it suffered heavy casualties before German attempts to throw the Americans back into the sea were thwarted by the artillery of the 45th "Thunderbird" and 36th" Arrowhead" Infantry Divisions, strongly supported by naval gunfire, bombing and the approach of British Eighth Army from the south. Major General Dawley was replaced after the battle, as he was judged to be worn out. He was replaced by Major General John Lucas.

From October to December 1943 VI Corps was involved in a bruising and bloody slog advancing from Naples up the Italian peninsula against the determined rearguard defence of the German 10th Army which skillfully took great advantage of the favorable terrain in organising successive lines of prepared defenses (Volturno Line, Barbara Line and Bernhardt Line). At the end of December, after heavy fighting on the Bernhardt Line (the forward defenses of the formidable Winter Line defenses) without a breakthrough, VI Corps was taken out of the line in an attempt to find a solution to the problem. In its second amphibious assault of the war, it came ashore at Anzio, south of Rome in Operation Shingle in January 1944 which was planned to threaten the rear lines of supply and communication of the German 10th Army. At first German resistance was negligible. However, Major General Lucas felt he needed to consolidate his beachhead before breaking out. This gave the Germans critical time to concentrate forces against him. Another bloody stalemate ensued, with the corps almost being driven back into the sea for the second time in Italy, again being rescued by naval and air power. When the stalemate was finally broken in the spring of 1944, the corps had lost another commander; Lucas was sacked for his poor performance and replaced by Major General Lucian Truscott, previously the commander of the 3rd Infantry Division. VI Corps also commanded units of the British Army during its time at Anzio, the British 1st Infantry Division, from 20 January until 21 May, and the British 2nd Commando Brigade and later, in mid-February, the British 56th Infantry Division and, from late March until 22 May, the British 5th Infantry Division.

When the corps broke out during Operation Diadem, it was ordered by the Fifth Army commander, Lieutenant General Mark Clark, northwest up the coast towards Rome instead of advancing northeast to block the German line of retreat from Cassino on the Gustav Line, leading to prolonged and bloody combat before it was taken by a combination of American, British, Canadian, French, and Polish troops. By disobeying his orders Clark received the glory of capturing the vacant Italian capital–abandoned without resistance by the Germans and left an open city–but was castigated by his peers and superiors for failing to trap and destroy the German forces. This, along with the poor performance at Anzio, would cast a shadow over the reputation of the corps.

==== Southern France ====
Following the capture of Rome, VI Corps again left the line, and again prepared for an amphibious assault, its third and last of the war. Operation Dragoon was aimed at capturing southern France, and VI Corps provided the assault troops, coming under Seventh Army. The landing, on 15 August 1944, was not opposed with much fervor, with allied casualties estimated at 95 killed and 385 wounded for the first day. German forces, by comparison, lost over 2,000 men, with the bulk taken prisoner. Fearing their forces in southern France would be caught in a squeeze between the U.S. Seventh Army and allied forces advancing eastward from Normandy, the Germans began a strategic retreat toward the north.

Wishing to avoid a repeat of the Anzio landings, elements of VI Corps moved north rapidly while the beachhead was consolidated. These units established a commanding position over the main route of German retreat near the town of Montelimar. Combat raged for a week over control of the main road through Montelimar with the Germans bent on escape but taking significant losses from U.S. artillery fire. When the Battle of Montelimar ended on 28 August 1944, the Germans had suffered 2,100 battle casualties plus 8,000 POWs, while the Americans had 1,575 casualties.

==== Vosges Mountains ====
The liberation of southern France occurred rapidly, with the corps taking Besançon on 7 September 1944, and fighting its way into Vesoul less than one week later. In mid-September, the character of the fighting changed from the pursuit operations of southern France to a grinding advance against firm German resistance in the Vosges Mountains of eastern France. VI Corps liberated Epinal on 25 September 1944 and pushed on to Bruyères in mid-October 1944. The drive on Saint-Dié ensued but required a month of agonizingly slow advances in the rough terrain of the Vosges. On 25 October 1944, Major General Edward H. Brooks assumed command of the corps when Truscott was promoted to take command of U.S. 5th Army in Italy. VI Corps completed its fight through the Vosges at the end of November, 1944, and moved onto the plains of Alsace.

==== Alsace ====
In the first two weeks of December, 1944, the corps liberated Sélestat and Hagenau and advanced to the German border. The German offensive into the Ardennes on 16 December 1944, forced a major redeployment of allied armies south of the Ardennes, and like the rest of the U.S. Seventh Army, the VI Corps assumed a defensive stance. At this time, the corps held the front between Bitche and the Rhine River.

During the German's Operation Nordwind (Unternehmen Nordwind), VI Corps was assaulted by elements of four German corps in the first week of January 1945, and the corps was forced to give ground in bitter winter fighting until 25 January 1945. While fighting was heavy all through the corps' front, the units of the corps took especially heavy losses in and around the Bas-Rhin towns of Herrlisheim and Drusenheim. The U.S. Seventh Army counter-attacked in the last week of January, 1945, and VI Corps recaptured lost ground north of Strasbourg until its attacks were halted by flooded ground near the Rhine River in mid-February, 1945.

==== Germany and Austria ====
The VI Corps resumed its advance in mid-March, 1945, reaching the German border for the second time. By the end of March, 1945, the corps had assaulted and pierced the Siegfried Line in the Wissembourg Gap and the Bienwald Forest, and driven to the Rhine River north of Karlsruhe. After crossing the Rhine, the corps moved toward Heilbronn in early April, 1945. Bitter resistance by Waffen SS troops, Nazi party auxiliary forces, and other German troops forced a harsh nine-day house-to-house battle, with Heilbronn being taken by the corps on 12 April 1945. Concurrently, armored units of the VI Corps were stopped and almost cut off during a heavily-fought four-day battle against SS Troops for Crailsheim that ended in a minor defeat for elements of the corps on 10 April 1945.

On 17 April 1945, the corps was ordered to move SE to the border of Switzerland. Within ten days, the corps had conquered Schwäbisch Hall, Kirchheim unter Teck, Schwäbisch Gmünd, Ulm (crossing the Danube River there), Memmingen, and Kempten. On 28 April 1945, the corps crossed into Austria near Füssen. Despite the obvious collapse of Nazi Germany, German forces continued to oppose the corps, forcing it to fight for the Fern Pass during 1–2 May 1945. On 4 May 1945, the corps occupied Innsbruck, crossed the Brenner Pass into Italy, and made contact with its old comrades of the U.S. Fifth Army. Within two days, all German forces in the region surrendered unconditionally, ending the war for VI Corps.

==== Campaign credits ====
VI Corps is credited with service in the Lorraine campaign (World War I) and with service in the Naples-Foggia (with arrowhead), Anzio (with arrowhead), Rome-Arno, Southern France (with arrowhead), Rhineland, Ardennes-Alsace, and Central Europe campaigns of World War II.

==== Inactivation ====
Headquarters, VI Corps, was redesignated Headquarters, United States Constabulary, on 1 May 1946. The corps was inactivated on 24 November 1950 in Germany. It was activated and redesignated VI Corps at Camp Atterbury, Indiana on 22 January 1951. It was inactivated on 1 April 1953 at Camp Atterbury, Indiana. Activated 22 November 1957 at Fort Benjamin Harrison, Indiana, part of the U.S. Army Reserve. Moved to Battle Creek in July 1962. The last inactivation occurred on 29 February 1968 at Battle Creek, Michigan.

Most of the responsibilities and units assigned to the continental corps were taken over by the newly-forming Army Reserve Commands. It appears that the 83rd Army Reserve Command was formed shortly afterwards and took responsibility for units in Ohio and Michigan.

== Commanding generals ==
- Maj. gen. Karl Truesdell (31 December 1940 – 15 December 1941)
- Maj. gen. George Grunert (15 December 1941 – March 1942)
- Maj. gen. Ernest J. Dawley (13 April 1942 – 21 September 1943)
- Maj. gen. John P. Lucas (21 September 1943 – 28 February 1944)
- Maj. gen. Lucian K. Truscott (28 February 1944 – 15 October 1944)
- Maj. gen. Edward H. Brooks (15 October 1944 – 20 May 1945)
- Maj. gen. William H. H. Morris Jr. (20 May 1945 – 30 September 1945)
- Maj. gen. Withers A. Burress (30 September 1945 – 10 January 1946)
- Maj. gen. Ernest N. Harmon (10 January 1946 – 1 May 1946)

=== Deputy Commanding generals ===
- Maj. gen. Lucian K. Truscott (18 February 1944 – 27 February 1944)
- Brig. gen. Frederic B. Butler (1 March 1944 – August 1944)

=== Artillery Commanders ===
- Brig. gen. Carl A. Baehr (12 February 1944 – 8 May 1945)

=== Chiefs of Staff ===
- Col. Charles W. Ryder (January 1941 – 12 January 1942)
- Col. Edward Almond (12 January 1942 - March 1942)
- Col. Don E. Carleton
- Col. Laurence B. Keiser (5 December 1943 – 22 February 1944)
- Col. Charles D. Palmer (October 1944 – June 1945)
- Col. Theodore E. Buechler (21 November 1945 – 17 April 1946)

== Sources ==
- Clarke, Jeffrey J.; Smith, Robert Ross (1993). Riviera to the Rhine. The official US Army History of the Seventh US Army. Washington DC: Center of Military History, United States Army. ISBN 978-0-16-025966-1.
- Williams, Mary H., compiler (1958). "U.S. Army in World War II, Chronology 1941–1945". Washington, D.C.: Government Printing Office.
- Wilson, John B. (1999). Armies, Corps, Divisions, and Separate Brigades. Washington, D.C.: Government Printing Office. ISBN 0-16-049994-1.
- Zaloga, Steven J. (2009). Operation Dragoon 1944: France's other D-Day. Osprey Publishing Ltd. ISBN 978-1-84603-367-4.
